= Fifth Woidke cabinet =

State government of Brandenburg

Fifth Cabinet of Dietmar Woidke Woidke V
- 10th Cabinet of Brandenburg
- 18 March 2026 – present
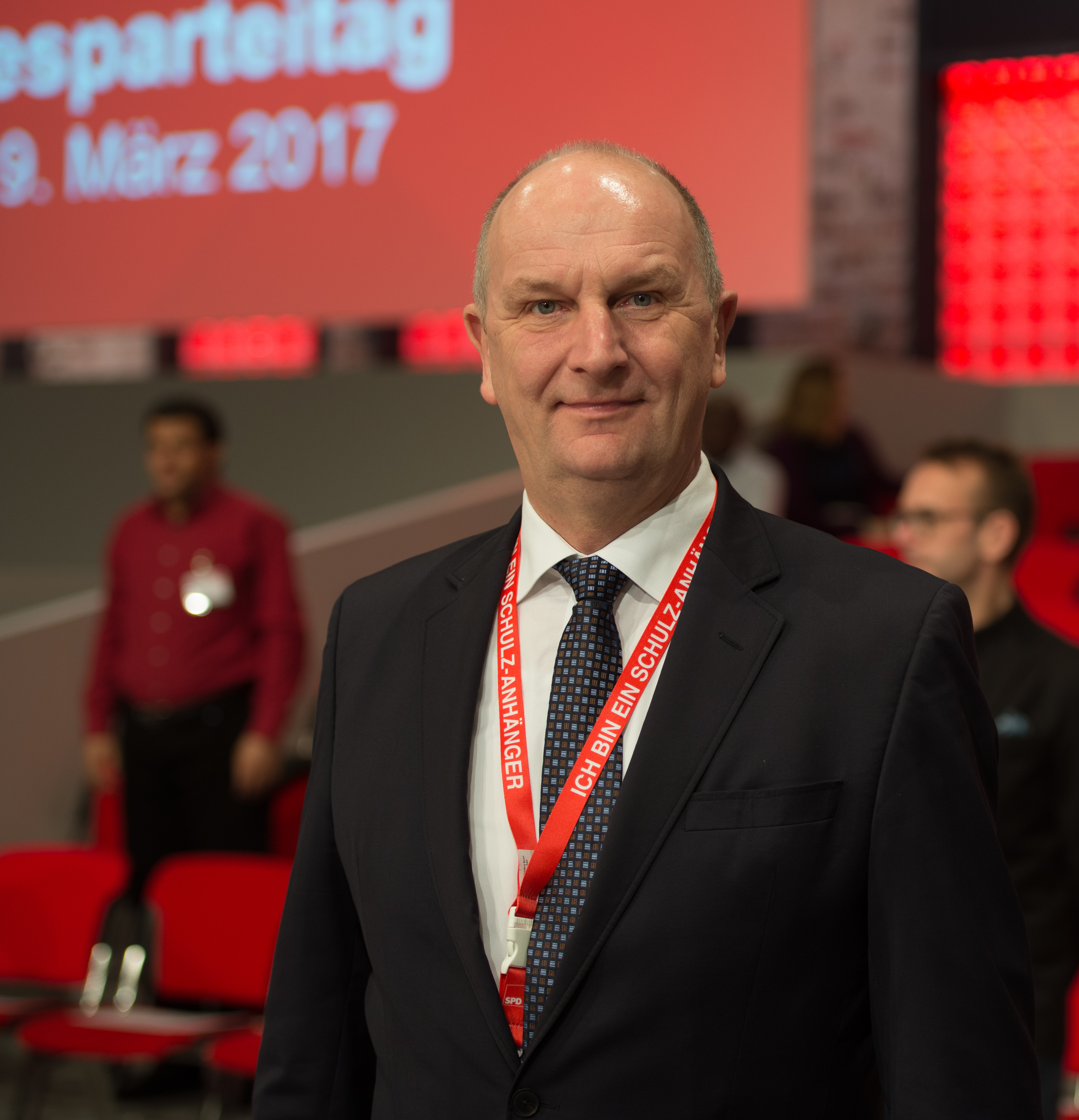
- Dietmar Woidke at the 2017 SPD federal party conference
- Date formed: 18 March 2026

People and organisations
- Minister-President: Dietmar Woidke (SPD)
- Deputy: Jan Redmann (CDU)
- No. of ministers: 10
- Member parties: Social Democratic Party; Christian Democratic Union
- Status in legislature: Grand coalition 46 / 88 (52%)
- Opposition parties: Alternative for Germany; Sahra Wagenknecht Alliance

History
- Legislature term: 8th Landtag of Brandenburg
- Predecessor: Fourth Woidke cabinet

The fifth Woidke cabinet is the incumbent state government of Brandenburg formed on March 18, 2026. SPD Minister President Dietmar Woidke leads the coalition of his party and the CDU.

After the break of the SPD-BSW coalition in January 2026, Woidke succeeded in forming a coalition with the CDU in March 2026. Technically speaking, the new cabinet is a continuation of the Woidke IV cabinet with a changed coalition basis, as Woidke did not resign and accordingly did not need to stand for a new election as minister-president in the state parliament.

== Cabinet ==
Office	Photo	Name	Party
Minister-President; State Chancellery		Dietmar Woidke	SPD
Deputy Minister-President		Jan Redmann	CDU
Minister of the Interior and Municipal Affairs		Jan Redmann	CDU
Minister of Finance		Daniel Keller	SPD
Minister of Economic Affairs, Energy, Climate Protection and European Affairs		Martina Klement	CSU (nominated by CDU)
Minister of Labour, Social Affairs, Health and Social Cohesion		René Wilke	SPD
Minister of Agriculture, Food, Environment and Consumer Protection		Hanka Mittelstädt	SPD
Minister of Science, Research and Culture		Manja Schüle	SPD
Minister of Education, Youth and Sport		Gordon Hoffmann	CDU
Minister of Justice and Digitalisation		Benjamin Grimm	SPD
Minister of Infrastructure and Regional Planning		Robert Crumbach	SPD
Head of the State Chancellery		Kathrin Schneider	SPD

== See also ==
- Second, Third & Fourth Woidke cabinet
- 2024 Brandenburg state election
- Red–purple coalition
