= Next Brandenburg state election =

German state election

- No later than 2029

All 88 seats of the Landtag of Brandenburg 45 seats needed for a majority
| Party | SPD | AfD |
| Last election | 32 seats, 30.9% | 30 seats, 29.2% |
| Current seats | 34 | 30 |
| Party | BSW | CDU |
| Last election | 14 seats, 13.5% | 12 seats, 12.1% |
| Current seats | 8 | 12 |
Incumbent Government
Fifth Woidke cabinet
SPD-CDU

The next election to the state parliament Landtag of Brandenburg is scheduled for 2029, about five years after the 22 September 2024 Brandenburg state election.

== Background ==
In the 2024 election, three parties failed to pass the 5 % threshold and lost their representation in the Brandenburg parliament, namely the Alliance 90/The Greens (The Greens), Die Linke (The Left), and the Free Democratic Party (FDP). Only four parties remain, one of them with 29% at second place being the Alternative for Germany, which is considered far-right and subject to a firewall policy. The Social Democratic Party of Germany (SPD) of Minister-President Dietmar Woidke retained the lead at 31%; however, with the Christian Democratic Union of Germany (CDU) dropping to 12%, only a cooperation with the new Bündnis Sahra Wagenknecht (BSW) with 14% could provide a tiny majority of two seats (46 of 88). The SPD talks with BSW, which had split off from The Left, were successful, they formed what is called a red-purple coalition. Woidke was elected as Minister-President for a fourth consecutive time on 11 December 2024.

=== Red-purple coalition dissolution ===
The SPD–BSW fourth Woidke cabinet entered a crisis on 11 November 2025, when BSW MdLs Jouleen Gruhn (its Landtag vice-president), Melanie Matzes, André von Ossowski, and Reinhard Simon left the BSW in protest of most of their bloc voting against the government on amendments to the State Treaty on Media, which regulates the country's public broadcasters. They remained as part of the BSW parliamentary group and continued supporting the government. Matzies and Simon subsequently returned to the party.

BSW leader and deputy Minister-President Robert Crumbach voted for the proposed amendments, which passed with votes from the CDU. He then announced his intent to leave the party on 5 January 2026, calling the BSW unfit for the responsibility of governing. He requested to join the SPD parliamentary group, but stopped short of rejoining the party as a member. The BSW repeatedly rejected the SPD's demand for a public pledge of loyalty to the coalition agreement. The party additionally called for Crumbach's dismissal as finance minister and resignation from the Landtag.

On 6 January 2026, Minister-President Woidke announced in a press conference he was ending the coalition with BSW and seeking negotiations with the CDU, who expressed willingness to cooperate. On the same day, Crumbach and Gruhn were accepted into the SPD parliamentary group as independents. This move transferred the old two-seat majority to the new proposed coalition. Von Ossowski left the BSW parliamentary group to sit as an independent. The two remaining BSW ministers – health minister Britta Müller and infrastructure minister Detlef Tabber – remained in office and also left the party on 8 January.

Woidke and SPD general secretary Kurt Fischer ruled out the prospect of new elections. The AfD tabled a motion to dissolve the Landtag in a special session on 9 January. This requires a two-thirds majority of 59 votes in order to pass; it received only 36 votes, with the AfD bloc of 30 and six BSW MdLs voting in favor. An effort to remove Gruhn as vice-president of the Landtag was also voted down. After the session, Matzes and Simon jointly released a statement that they were once again leaving the BSW to sit as independents. An SPD-CDU coalition agreement was signed in March 2026, creating the fifth Woidke cabinet. Matzes, Simon and von Ossowski formed the parliamentary group We for Brandenburg in June, which continued to support the government.

== Opinion polls ==
=== Graphical summary ===
Brandenburg state election polls since 2024

=== Party polling ===
| Polling firm | Fieldwork date | Sample size | SPD | AfD | BSW | CDU | Grüne | Linke | BVB/FW | FDP | Others | Lead |
|---|---|---|---|---|---|---|---|---|---|---|---|---|
| INSA | 29 Sep – 6 Oct 2026 | 1,000 | 20 | 40 | 7 | 9 | 7 | 9 | – | – | 8 | 20 |
| Infratest dimap | 18–22 Jun 2026 | 1,159 | 22 | 37 | 4 | 12 | 6 | 12 | – | – | 7 | 15 |
| INSA | 11–18 Mar 2026 | 1,000 | 24 | 34 | 8 | 14 | 5 | 7 | – | – | 8 | 10 |
| INSA | 9–14 Jan 2026 | 1,000 | 25 | 34 | 8 | 13 | 5 | 8 | – | – | 7 | 9 |
| Infratest dimap | 3–8 Dec 2025 | 1,184 | 22 | 35 | 7 | 14 | 5 | 9 | – | – | 8 | 13 |
| INSA | 9–15 Sep 2025 | 1,000 | 24 | 34 | 9 | 13 | 4 | 9 | 2 | 2 | 3 | 10 |
| Infratest dimap | 19–23 Jun 2025 | 1,185 | 23 | 32 | 9 | 14 | 5 | 9 | – | – | 8 | 9 |
| 2025 federal election | 23 Feb 2025 | – | 14.8 | 32.5 | 10.7 | 18.1 | 6.6 | 10.7 | | 3.4 | 3.2 | 14.4 |
| INSA | 20–27 Jan 2025 | 1,000 | 25 | 29 | 13 | 17 | 3 | 5 | 2 | 2 | 6 | 4 |
| Infratest dimap | 4–7 Dec 2024 | 1,183 | 28 | 30 | 12 | 15 | 5 | 4 | – | – | 6 | 2 |
| 2024 state election | 22 Sep 2024 | – | 30.9 | 29.2 | 13.5 | 12.1 | 4.1 | 3.0 | 2.6 | 0.8 | 4.1 | 1.7 |

== See also ==
- Politics of Brandenburg
