= State government (Germany) =

Government of a state (Land) in Germany

Government parties and number of seats in the Bundesrat (since 18 December 2024)

A Landesregierung (state government) is the government of a state (Land) in Germany. In Bavaria and Saxony, the state government is called the Staatsregierung (State Government), while in the city-states of Berlin, Bremen, and Hamburg, it is called the Senat (Senate).

== Composition and function ==
The state government consists of the head of government and a specific number of ministers (or state ministers or senators). The legal status of the members of a state government is regulated in the Ministers Acts of the individual states.

The heads of government are called Minister-president in the area states, Governing Mayor in Berlin, President of the Senate and Mayor in Bremen, and First Mayor and President of the Senate in Hamburg. In the city-states, the senates function simultaneously as the state government and as the municipal administration.

The number and areas of responsibility of the ministers vary from state to state; they are either prescribed in the state constitutions, determined by a special law, or established by the Minister-president at their discretion. In Baden-Württemberg, Bavaria, Bremen, the Saarland, and Saxony, the state government may include other members in addition to the ministers or senators (such as state secretaries with voting rights).

State governments are responsible for executing most federal laws in addition to their own state laws, maintaining jurisdiction over areas such as police, education, and cultural affairs. Decisions made by a state government initially usually have only political significance and often require further steps. For example, a draft law proposed by the government must be debated in the respective state parliament. Depending on the statutory provisions, legal ordinances and administrative regulations can be issued by the state government or an individual minister. In the interest of cooperation between ministers, such decrees are often preceded by a decision of the state government, even if this is not formally required by law.

== System of government ==
In terms of state or governmental form, all German states are currently parliamentary republics. This means that the government of each state (executive) is principally dependent on the confidence of a parliament elected by the people (legislature) at the state level.

The constitutional framework conditions for this form of government are mandatorily prescribed by federal constitutional law, specifically the so-called homogeneity principle of the Basic Law for the Federal Republic of Germany (Article 28 of the Basic Law for the Federal Republic of Germany). The Basic Law guarantees the states "considerable autonomy" to prevent the centralization of power that characterized the Nazi era. However, the specific organizational structure of the system of government is not dictated by this, meaning that the principle basically allows for a presidential form of government or other forms of democratic state order and their variants in the states. The determination of the rules by which the state organs are formed, and what functions and competencies they possess, is principally a matter for the states and is subject to the regulations of the state constitutions.

State governments also play a direct role in federal legislation. They appoint members to the Bundesrat (Federal Council), the upper house of the federal legislature, allowing them to participate in the legislative process and administration at the national level.

== Current state governments ==
Map of the governing coalitions of the German states

The longest-serving incumbent head of government of a German state is Dietmar Woidke, who has served as the minister-president of Brandenburg since 28 August 2013. Gordon Schnieder, the minister-president of Rhineland-Palatinate since 18 May 2026, is the shortest-serving incumbent.

State	Portrait	Head of government (Note: All heads of government are styled "Minister-President" unless otherwise indicated.) Date of birth	Party	Took office	Time in office	Last election	Next election	Current cabinet
Baden-Württemberg		Cem Özdemir; 21 December 1965 (age 60)	Greens	13 May 2026	146 days	2026	2031	Özdemir
Bavaria		Markus Söder; 5 January 1967 (age 59)	CSU	16 March 2018	8 years, 204 days	2023	2028	Söder III
Berlin		Governing Mayor; Kai Wegner; 15 September 1972 (age 54)	CDU	27 April 2023	3 years, 162 days	2023	2026	Wegner
Brandenburg		Dietmar Woidke; 22 October 1961 (age 64)	SPD	28 August 2013	13 years, 39 days	2024	2029	Woidke IV/V
Bremen		President of the Senate and Mayor; Andreas Bovenschulte; 11 August 1965 (age 61)	SPD	15 August 2019	7 years, 52 days	2023	2027	Bovenschulte II
Hamburg		First Mayor; Peter Tschentscher; 20 January 1966 (age 60)	SPD	28 March 2018	8 years, 192 days	2025	2030	Tschentscher III
Hesse		Boris Rhein; 2 January 1972 (age 54)	CDU	31 May 2022	4 years, 128 days	2023	2028	Rhein II
Lower Saxony		Olaf Lies; 8 May 1967 (age 59)	SPD	20 May 2025	1 year, 139 days	2022	2027	Lies
Mecklenburg-Vorpommern		Manuela Schwesig; 23 May 1974 (age 52)	SPD	4 July 2017	9 years, 94 days	2021	2026	Schwesig II
North Rhine-Westphalia		Hendrik Wüst; 19 July 1975 (age 51)	CDU	27 October 2021	4 years, 344 days	2022	2027	Wüst II
Rhineland-Palatinate		Gordon Schnieder; 8 July 1975 (age 51)	CDU	18 May 2026	141 days	2026	2031	Schnieder
Saarland		Anke Rehlinger; 6 April 1976 (age 50)	SPD	25 April 2022	4 years, 164 days	2022	2027	Rehlinger
Saxony		Michael Kretschmer; 7 May 1975 (age 51)	CDU	13 December 2017	8 years, 297 days	2024	2029	Kretschmer III
Saxony-Anhalt		Sven Schulze; 31 July 1979 (age 47)	CDU	28 January 2026	251 days	2021	2026	Schulze
Schleswig-Holstein		Daniel Günther; 24 July 1973 (age 53)	CDU	28 June 2017	9 years, 100 days	2022	2027	Günther II
Thuringia		Mario Voigt; 8 February 1977 (age 49)	CDU	12 December 2024	1 year, 298 days	2024	2029	Voigt

== Historical overview of all state governments ==
The structure and authority of state governments in Germany have evolved significantly through four major historical phases.

=== German Empire (1871–1918) ===
Following the Unification of Germany in 1871, the German Empire was established as a federal state comprising 25 sovereign entities (kingdoms, duchies, and city-states). The system was characterized by a "functional division" of power: while the Imperial government enacted legislation, the administration and implementation of these laws remained the exclusive domain of the state governments. This period was marked by the dominance of Prussia, comprising two-thirds of the territory, where the Prussian Prime Minister frequently served simultaneously as the Imperial Chancellor.

=== Weimar Republic (1919–1933) ===
The Weimar Constitution of 1919 officially introduced the term Länder (lands/states) for the constituent republics. While maintaining a federal structure, the Weimar Republic centralized significant powers, particularly financial sovereignty. Unlike in the Empire, the federal government took over tax collection, leaving state governments dependent on federal grants for funding.

=== Nazi Era (1933–1945) ===
State governments were effectively stripped of their sovereignty during the Nazi era through the policy of Gleichschaltung (coordination). The "Law on the Reconstruction of the Reich" (1934) abolished the state parliaments and transferred sovereign rights to the central government, reducing the states to administrative provinces headed by centrally appointed Reichsstatthalter (Reich Governors).

=== Federal Republic (1949–present) ===
After World War II, the Basic Law (1949) restored the federal order as a safeguard against central authoritarianism. The Western Allies reorganized state borders to create viable economic units, resulting in the formation of new states like North Rhine-Westphalia and Baden-Württemberg (merged in 1952). Upon German reunification in 1990, the five states of the former East Germany (which had been abolished in 1952 in favor of centralized districts) were reconstituted and joined the Federal Republic, bringing the total number of state governments to sixteen.

Overview of the Minister-Presidents

=== Women as chairpersons of state governments ===
So far, nine women have chaired a state government in Germany. However, only three of them, Hannelore Kraft, Franziska Giffey, and Anke Rehlinger, won the office through a lead candidacy in a general election. Five were elected by the respective parliamentary majorities following the resignation of the incumbents, and one held the office in an acting capacity.

The first woman to lead the government of a German state was Louise Schroeder (SPD), who led the Berlin Magistrate in an acting capacity from 18 August 1947 to 7 December 1948, because the originally elected Lord Mayor was not confirmed by the Allied Kommandatura (see also Magistrate Schroeder).

Heide Simonis (SPD) was first elected Minister-President of Schleswig-Holstein in 1993 and remained in office until 2005 (see also Cabinet Simonis I, II, and III). Since the election of Christine Lieberknecht (CDU) as Minister-President of Thuringia (see also Cabinet Lieberknecht) in 2009, women have continuously headed at least one state government.

Currently (2024), two women head a state government as Minister-Presidents: in Mecklenburg-Vorpommern, Manuela Schwesig since July 2017, and in Saarland, Anke Rehlinger since April 2022 (see also Cabinet Schwesig I and II as well as Cabinet Rehlinger).

The proportion of women among the chairpersons of the 16 state governments reached 25 percent for the first time in 2013 and from 2022 to 2023; it thus came significantly closer within a few years to the proportion of women in the 16 state parliaments, which ranges between 18.8 percent (Baden-Württemberg) and around 40 percent (Bremen, Brandenburg) and averages around one-third of the deputies. Since the 1990s, the proportions of women in the individual state parliaments have risen significantly.

With two out of seven, the proportion of women among SPD Minister-Presidents has been 28.6 percent since July 2024. The CDU in six federal states, the CSU in Bavaria, The Left in Thuringia, and Alliance 90/The Greens in Baden-Württemberg do not currently field a woman from their ranks for the top office of the state governments led by them.

Women as Minister-Presidents of German states
Period	1947–1948	1948–1993	1993–2005	2005–2009	2009–2010	2010–2011	2011–2013	2013–2014	2014–2017	2017	2017–2018	2018–2021	2021–2022	2022–2023	2023–2024	since 2024
Minister-Presidents/ Term(s) of office	Louise Schroeder (SPD); 1947–1948		Heide Simonis (SPD); 1993–1996; 1996–2000; 2000–2005		Christine Lieberknecht (CDU); 2009–2014				rowspan="2"|	Manuela Schwesig (SPD); 2017–2021; 2021–						
Minister-Presidents/ Term(s) of office	Louise Schroeder (SPD); 1947–1948		Heide Simonis (SPD); 1993–1996; 1996–2000; 2000–2005			Hannelore Kraft (SPD); 2010–2012; 2012–2017				rowspan="2"|	Franziska Giffey (SPD); 2021–2023					
Minister-Presidents/ Term(s) of office	Louise Schroeder (SPD); 1947–1948		Heide Simonis (SPD); 1993–1996; 1996–2000; 2000–2005				Annegret Kramp-Karrenbauer (CDU); 2011–2012; 2012–2017; 2017–2018					colspan="3" style="background:#FFC1C1;"| Anke Rehlinger (SPD); 2022–				
Minister-Presidents/ Term(s) of office	Louise Schroeder (SPD); 1947–1948		Heide Simonis (SPD); 1993–1996; 1996–2000; 2000–2005				colspan="8" style="background:#FFC1C1;"| Malu Dreyer (SPD); 2013–2016; 2016–2021; 2021–2024									
Number of women serving simultaneously	1	none	1	none	1	2	3	4	3	2	3	2	3	4	3	2
Percentage of women among Minister-Presidents of all 16 states (different number of states until 1990)	5.9 %	0 %	6.3 %	0 %	6.3 %	12.5 %	18.8 %	25.0 %	18.8 %	12.5 %	18.8 %	12.5 %	18.8 %	25.0 %	18.8 %	12.5 %

== See also ==
- Evangelical Bureau
- Catholic Bureau

== Sources ==
- "Germany". Encyclopædia Britannica. 2024.
- "Federalism". Oxford Reference. Oxford University Press. 2024.
- Renzsch, Wolfgang (2017). "The Long-Term Development of Federalism in Germany". 50 Shades of Federalism.
- Dauke, Eva (2024-05-23). "Anniversary of the German Basic Law – German Constitutions in the Course of Time". Library of Congress.
