= Fourth Woidke cabinet =

State government of Brandenburg from 2024 to 2026

Fourth Cabinet of Dietmar Woidke Woidke IV
- 10th Cabinet of Brandenburg
- 11 December 2024 – 17 March 2026
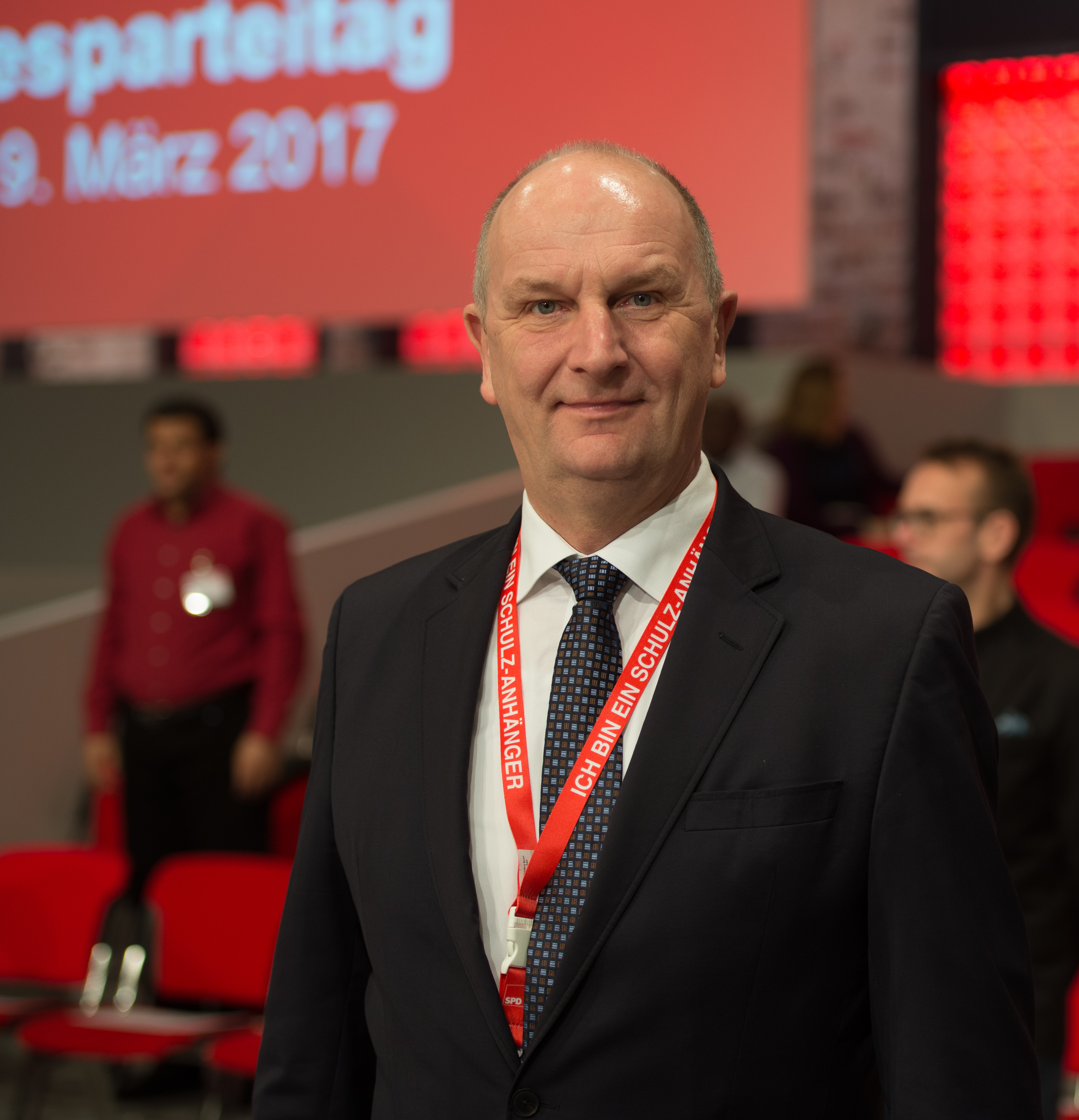
- Dietmar Woidke at the 2017 SPD federal party conference
- Date formed: 11 December 2024
- Date dissolved: 17 March 2026

People and organisations
- Minister-President: Dietmar Woidke (SPD)
- Deputy: Robert Crumbach (SPD; BSW until January 2026; Ind. Jan–Mar 2026) until 17 March 2026; Jan Redmann (CDU) since 17 March 2026
- No. of ministers: 10
- Member parties: Social Democratic Party; Sahra Wagenknecht Alliance (until January 2026); Christian Democratic Union of Germany (since March 2026)
- Status in legislature: Minority
- Opposition parties: Alternative for Germany; Christian Democratic Union (until March 2026); Sahra Wagenknecht Alliance (since January 2026)

History
- Election: 2024 Brandenburg state election
- Legislature term: 8th Landtag of Brandenburg
- Predecessor: Third Woidke cabinet
- Successor: Fifth Woidke cabinet

The fourth Woidke cabinet was the state government of Brandenburg formed on 11 December 2024. SPD Minister President Dietmar Woidke led the coalition of his party and the Sahra Wagenknecht Alliance (BSW). This government ushered in the BSW as governing partner in any government in Germany for the first time as a so-called "red–purple coalition", two days ahead of BSW's entrance into the Voigt cabinet in Thuringia. Excluding the Minister-President, the cabinet comprised ten ministers. Among them seven were members of the SPD, two were from the BSW and one without party affiliation nominated by BSW.

From November 2025 onwards, two BSW MPs resigned from their party and then from their parliamentary group due to ‘authoritarian tendencies’ within BSW. On 6 January 2026, Woidke announced the end of cooperation with the BSW parliamentary group and the end of the coalition between SPD and BSW. The three ministers chosen by the BSW (Finance minister Robert Crumbach, Health minister Britta Müller (de) and Infrastructure minister Detlef Tabbert (de) announced that they were no longer BSW members.

The three ministers remained in office and Woidke's government continued as a minority government. As Crumbach and BSW-nominated vice-president of the Landtag Jouleen Gruhn joined the SPD parliamentary group, an SPD-CDU coalition would now have a majority of seats in the Landtag of Brandenburg and was pursued.

The AfD, leading in polls for a regular 2029 Brandenburg state election, tabled a motion to dissolve the Landtag for a snap election. In a special session on 9 January 2026, the move failed as it requires a two-thirds majority of 59 votes in order to pass. In March 2026, Woidke succeeded in forming a coalition with the CDU. The cabinet was subsequently reshuffled. This reshuffled cabinet is often referred to as the Woidke V cabinet, although formally it is a continuation of the government that has been in place since 2024.

== Formation ==
While the SPD gained 7 seats at the 2024 Brandenburg state election, the previous government were no longer able to command a majority as its main governing partner in the third Woidke cabinet the Christian Democratic Union (CDU) lost three seats while the other partner, the Alliance 90/The Greens, failed to clear the 5% threshold and thus was completely shut out of the legislature. The composition of the Landtag is (as of 2024) as follows (showing only parties with seats before or after the election):

| Party | Leader | List | Direct | Total |
|---|---|---|---|---|
| Social Democratic Party | Dietmar Woidke | 13 | 19 | 32 |
| Alternative for Germany | Hans-Christoph Berndt | 5 | 25 | 30 |
| Sahra Wagenknecht Alliance | Robert Crumbach | 14 | 0 | 14 |
| Christian Democratic Union | Jan Redmann | 12 | 0 | 12 |

With the Landtag consisting of 88 seats, 45 votes in the state parliament is the smallest majority. The Landtag held two ballots on December 11, 2024, and confirmed its confidence in Minister President Woidke on the second ballot.
Balloting for to confirm the Minister President were as follows:

| Candidate | Position | 1st Ballot | | 2nd Ballot | |
|---|---|---|---|---|---|
| Dietmar Woidke (SPD) | For | 43 | 48.9% | 50 | 56.8% |
| Dietmar Woidke (SPD) | Against | 40 | 45.5% | 36 | 40.9% |
| Dietmar Woidke (SPD) | Abstentions | 2 | 2.3% | 1 | 1.1% |
| Dietmar Woidke (SPD) | Spoiled | 2 | 2.3% | | |

The fourth Woidke cabinet was sworn in after Woidke received 50 out of 88 votes on the second ballot.

== Cabinet (before 17 March 2026) ==
| Portfolio | Minister | Party | Term of Office | |
| Portfolio | Minister | Party | Start | End |
|---|---|---|---|---|
| Minister-President; State Chancellor | Dietmar Woidke | SPD | August 28, 2013 | incumbent |
| Deputy Minister-President | Robert Crumbach | Independent (BSW until 6 January 2026) | December 11, 2024 | incumbent |
| Finance and Europe | Robert Crumbach | Independent (BSW until 6 January 2026) | December 11, 2024 | incumbent |
| Interior and Communities | Katrin Lange (Minister for Finance and Europe in Woidke III) | SPD | December 11, 2024 | May 16, 2025 |
| Interior and Communities | René Wilke | SPD (Independent until November 2025) | May 22, 2025 | incumbent |
| Agriculture, Food, Environment and Consumer Protection | Hanka Mittelstädt | SPD | December 13, 2024 (acting prior : Katrin Lange) | incumbent |
| Education, Youth and Sports | Steffen Freiberg | SPD | April 17, 2023; Continued from Woidke III | incumbent |
| Science, Research and Culture | Manja Schüle | SPD | November 20, 2019; Continued from Woidke III | incumbent |
| Economic Affairs, Labor, Energy and Climate Protection | Daniel Keller | SPD | December 11, 2024 | incumbent |
| Justice and Digitalization | Benjamin Grimm | SPD | December 11, 2024 | incumbent |
| Health and Social Affairs | Britta Müller non-partisan (nominated by BSW) | Independent (BSW from September 2025 until 6 January 2026) | December 11, 2024 | incumbent |
| Infrastructure and Regional Planning | Detlef Tabbert | Independent (BSW until 6 January 2026) | December 11, 2024 | incumbent |
| Responsible for the State Chancellery | Kathrin Schneider | SPD | November 20, 2019; Continued from Woidke III | incumbent |

== Cabinet (after 17 March 2026) ==
| Office | Photo | Name | Party |
|---|---|---|---|
| Minister-President; State Chancellery | | Dietmar Woidke | SPD |
| Deputy Minister-President | | Jan Redmann | CDU |
| Minister of the Interior and Municipal Affairs | | Jan Redmann | CDU |
| Minister of Finance | | Daniel Keller | SPD |
| Minister of Economic Affairs, Energy, Climate Protection and European Affairs | | Martina Klement | CSU (nominated by CDU) |
| Minister of Labour, Social Affairs, Health and Social Cohesion | | René Wilke | SPD |
| Minister of Agriculture, Food, Environment and Consumer Protection | | Hanka Mittelstädt | SPD |
| Minister of Science, Research and Culture | | Manja Schüle | SPD |
| Minister of Education, Youth and Sport | | Gordon Hoffmann | CDU |
| Minister of Justice and Digitalisation | | Benjamin Grimm | SPD |
| Minister of Infrastructure and Regional Planning | | Robert Crumbach | SPD |
| Head of the State Chancellery | | Kathrin Schneider | SPD |

== State Secretaries ==
The State Secretaries are the most senior civil servants of the state of Brandenburg. They serve as departmental heads of the ministries, permanent deputies of the ministers, or — like the State Representative of Brandenburg to the Federal Government — take on special responsibilities.

| State Chancellery and Ministries | State Secretaries |
|---|---|
| State Chancellery | David Kolesnyk (SPD); State Representative of Brandenburg to the Federal Government |
| Ministry of Finance | Frank Stolper (SPD) |
| Ministry of the Interior and Municipal Affairs | Uwe Schüler (CDU) |
| Ministry of Agriculture, Food, Environment and Consumer Protection | Stephan Nickisch (non-partisan) |
| Ministry of Education, Youth and Sport | Isabelle Haß (CDU) |
| Ministry of Science, Research and Culture | Tobias Dünow (SPD) |
| Ministry of Economic Affairs, Energy, Climate Protection and European Affairs | Markus Niggemann (CDU) |
| Ministry of Justice and Digitalisation | Ernst Bürger (non-partisan) |
| Ministry of Labour, Social Affairs, Health and Social Cohesion | Johannes Wagner (non-partisan) |
| Ministry of Infrastructure and Regional Planning | Volker-Gerd Westphal (SPD) |

== See also ==
- Second & Third Woidke cabinet
- 2024 Brandenburg state election
- Red–purple coalition
