= Michael Stübgen =

German politician (born 1959)

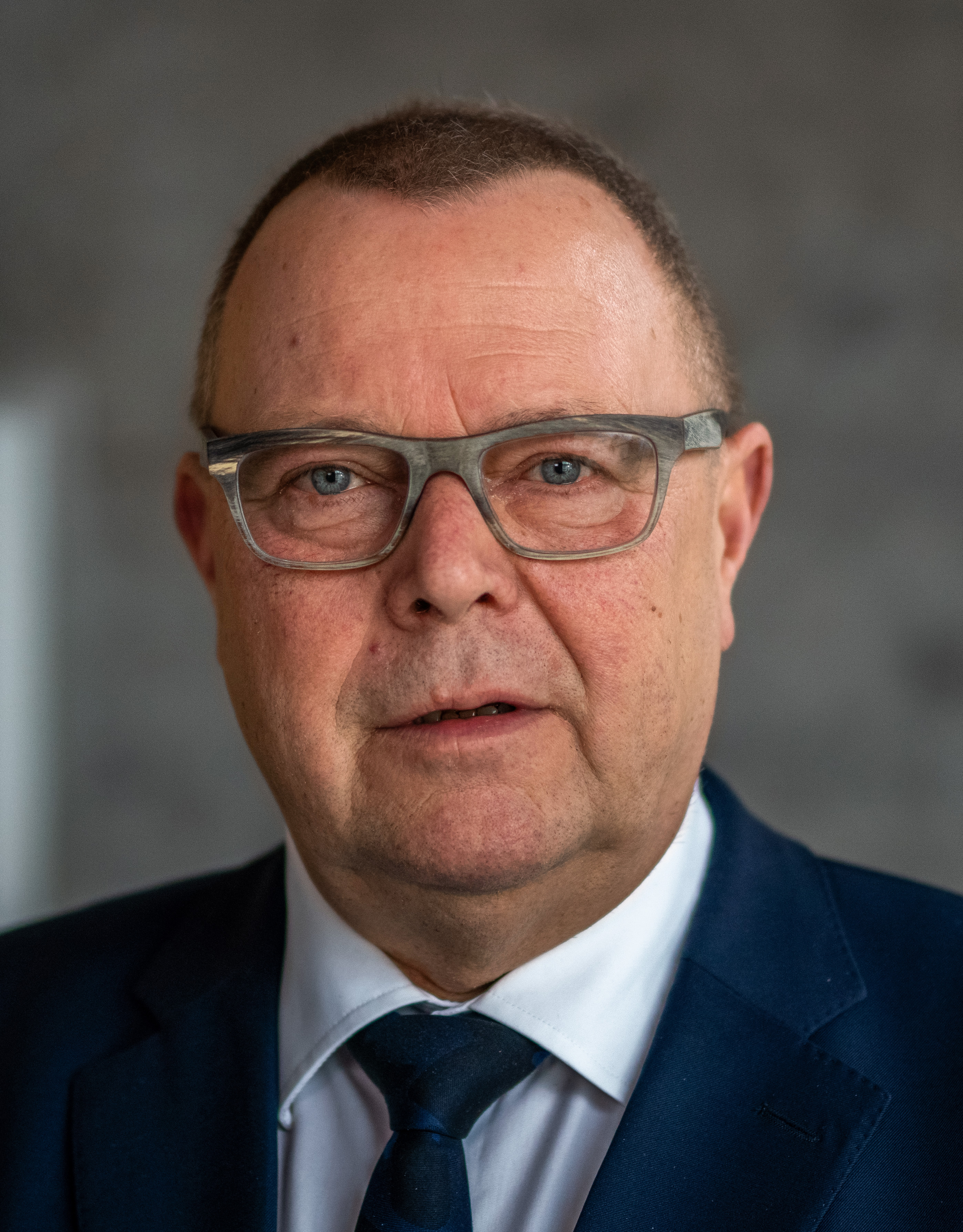
- Stübgen in 2024

Deputy Minister-President of Brandenburg
- In office 20 November 2019 – 11 December 2024
- Minister-President: Dietmar Woidke
- Preceded by: Christian Görke
- Succeeded by: Robert Crumbach

Minister for the Interior and Communal Affairs of Brandenburg
- In office 20 November 2019 – 11 December 2024
- Minister-President: Dietmar Woidke
- Preceded by: Karl-Heinz Schröter
- Succeeded by: Katrin Lange

Parliamentary State Secretary of Food and Agriculture
- In office 14 March 2018 – 20 November 2019
- Minister: Julia Klöckner
- Preceded by: Peter Bleser; Maria Flachsbarth
- Succeeded by: Uwe Feiler

Member of the Bundestag; from Brandenburg
- In office 20 December 1990 – 2 December 2019
- Preceded by: Constituency established
- Succeeded by: Saskia Ludwig
- Constituency: Bad Liebenwerda – Finsterwalde – Herzberg – Lübben – Luckau (1990–1994); State list (1994–2009); Elbe-Elster – Oberspreewald-Lausitz II (2009–2019)

Personal details
- Born: 17 October 1959 (age 67) Lauchhammer, East Germany
- Party: Christian Democratic Union
- Children: 3

Michael Stübgen (born 17 October 1959) is a German politician of the Christian Democratic Union (CDU) who has served as State Minister of the Interior and for Local Affairs in the cabinet of Minister-President of Brandenburg Dietmar Woidke from 2019 to 2024. He previously served as a member of the Bundestag from the state of Brandenburg from 1990 till 2019.

== Political career ==
=== Member of the German Parliament (1990–2019) ===
Stübgen joined the CDU in 1990.

Stübgen was a member of the German Bundestag from 1990 to 2019, where he was deputy chairman of the Committee on European Union Affairs from 1994 to 1998. He was Chairman of the Brandenburg regional group in the CDU/CSU parliamentary group from 1998. From 2005 to 2018, Stübgen was also the European policy spokesman of the CDU/CSU parliamentary group in the Bundestag and chairman of the parliamentary group working group on European Union affairs. From October 2011 to March 2018, Stübgen was also a deputy member of the Budget Committee of the German Bundestag.

In the negotiations to form a coalition government of the Christian Democrats (CDU together with the Bavarian CSU) and the FDP following the 2009 federal elections, Stübgen was part of the CDU/CSU delegation in the working group on foreign affairs, defense, Europe and development policy, led by Franz Josef Jung and Werner Hoyer.

From 2018 to 2019, Stübgen served as Parliamentary State Secretary under minister Julia Klöckner at the Federal Ministry of Food and Agriculture.

=== Career in state government ===
Since 2019, Stübgen has been serving as chairman of the CDU in Brandenburg. Following the 2019 state elections, he was appointed State Minister of the Interior and for Local Affairs in Brandenburg on November 20, 2019.

In December 2022, Stübgen announced his intention to resign as chairman of the CDU in Brandenburg.

== Other activities ==
- German Forum for Crime Prevention (DFK), Ex-Officio Member of the Board of Trustees (since 2020)
