= Prignitz II/Ostprignitz-Ruppin II =

State electoral district of Germany

2: Prignitz II/Ostprignitz-Ruppin II
- Electoral district for the Landtag of Brandenburg
- Prignitz II/Ostprignitz-Ruppin in 2024
- District: Prignitz
- Electorate: 43,543 (2024)
- Major settlements: Kyritz, Pritzwalk, and Wittstock

Current electoral district
- Created: 1994
- Party: AfD
- Member: Torsten Arndt

Prignitz II/Ostprignitz-Ruppin II is an electoral constituency (German: Wahlkreis) represented in the Landtag of Brandenburg. It elects one member via first-past-the-post voting. Under the constituency numbering system, it is designated as constituency 2. It is located in the Prignitz district

== Geography ==
The constituency includes the towns of Kyritz, Pritzwalk, and Wittstock, the communities of Heiligengrabe and Grosse Pankow, and the administrative divisions of Meyenburg and Putlitz-Berge.

There were 43,543 eligible voters in 2024.

Election	Member	Party	%
1994	Robert Gemmel	SPD	
1999	Robert Gemmel	SPD	
2004	Wolfgang Gehrcke-Reymann	PDS	32.8
2009	Dieter Groß	Left	
2014	Ina Muhß	SPD	
2019	Katrin Lange	SPD	
2024	Torsten Arndt	AfD	36.2

== Election results ==
=== 2024 election ===
State election (2024): Eichsfeld I
Notes:	Blue background denotes the winner of the electorate vote. Pink background denotes a candidate elected from their party list. Yellow background denotes an electorate win by a list member, or other incumbent. A ✓ or ✗ denotes status of any incumbent, win or lose respectively.						
Party	Candidate	Votes	%	±%	Party votes	%	±%
AfD	Torsten Ardnt	10,630	36.2	▲13.3	10,178	34.5	▲10.5
SPD	Katrin Lange	9,723	33.1	▲3.8	8,654	29.4	▼0.4
CDU	Gehrmann	5,460	18.6	▼1.8	4,195	14.2	▼3.5
BSW					3,669	12.5	
Left	Kippenhahn	1,207	4.1	▼8.2	714	2.4	▼8.5
BVB/FW	Güldener	1,114	3.8	▼2.8	541	1.8	▼2.5
Independent	Mießner	373	1.3				
Greens	Beutling	321	1.1	▼5.0	523	1.8	▼5.2
Tierschutzpartei					428	1.5	▼0.6
Plus	Heidkamp	223	0.8		158	0.5	▼0.4
DLW					145	0.5	
FDP	Lindermann	186	0.6	▼1.7	133	0.5	▼2.6
Third Way	Dühmke	106	0.4		87	0.3	
Values					31	0.1	
DKP					12	0.0	
Informal votes		403			278		
Total valid votes		29,343			29,468		
Turnout		29,746	68.3	▲13/5			
AfD gain from SPD	Majority	907	3.1				

=== 2019 election ===
State election (2019): Prignitz II/Ostprignitz-Ruppin II
Notes:	Blue background denotes the winner of the electorate vote. Pink background denotes a candidate elected from their party list. Yellow background denotes an electorate win by a list member, or other incumbent. A ✓ or ✗ denotes status of any incumbent, win or lose respectively.						
Party	Candidate	Votes	%	±%	Party votes	%	±%
SPD	Katrin Lange	7,178	29.3	▼1.4	7,274	29.7	▼2.1
AfD	Dr. Arnd Heymann	5,603	22.9	▲13.9	5,888	24.1	▲14.2
CDU	Dr. Jan Redmann	4,980	20.4	▼8.9	4,336	17.7	▼10.1
Left	Dieter Groß	3,008	12.3	▼11.0	2,680	10.9	▼10.1
BVB/FW	Christa Pfeifer	1,603	6.6	▲4.7	1,067	4.4	▲2.8
Greens	Matthias Dittmer	1,502	6.1	▲2.7	1,717	7.0	▲3.5
FDP	Tom-Morten Theiß	583	2.4	Steady	749	3.1	▲1.7
Tierschutzpartei					498	2.0	
Pirates					129	0.5	▼0.5
ÖDP					101	0.4	
V-Partei3					36	0.1	
Informal votes		261			243		
Total valid votes		24,457			24,475		
Turnout		24,718	54.8	▲11.3			
SPD hold	Majority	1,575	6.4	▲5.0			

=== 2014 election ===
State election (2014): Prignitz II/Ostprignitz-Ruppin II
Notes:	Blue background denotes the winner of the electorate vote. Pink background denotes a candidate elected from their party list. Yellow background denotes an electorate win by a list member, or other incumbent. A ✓ or ✗ denotes status of any incumbent, win or lose respectively.						
Party	Candidate	Votes	%	±%	Party votes	%	±%
SPD	Ina Muhß	6,113	30.7	▲2.0	6,362	31.8	▼1.0
CDU	Dr. Jan Redmann	5,844	29.3	▲6.2	5,557	27.8	▲7.3
Left	✗ Dieter Groß	4,650	23.3	▼7.9	4,199	21.0	▼8.8
AfD	Rainer Schnell	1,800	9.0		1,972	9.9	
Greens	Kathrin Anke Boleslawsky	677	3.4	▼0.6	702	3.5	▲0.2
NPD					360	1.8	▼0.6
FDP	Christian Kenzler	474	2.4	▼3.4	274	1.4	▼5.6
BVB/FW	Carina Simmes	386	1.9	▼2.7	314	1.6	▼0.7
Pirates					204	1.0	
DKP					26	0.1	Steady
REP					23	0.1	Steady
Informal votes		338			289		
Total valid votes		19,944			19,993		
Turnout		20,282	43.5	▼18.9			
SPD gain from Left	Majority	269	1.4				

=== 2009 election ===
State election (2009): Prignitz II/Ostprignitz-Ruppin II
Notes:	Blue background denotes the winner of the electorate vote. Pink background denotes a candidate elected from their party list. Yellow background denotes an electorate win by a list member, or other incumbent. A ✓ or ✗ denotes status of any incumbent, win or lose respectively.						
Party	Candidate	Votes	%	±%	Party votes	%	±%
Left	Dieter Groß	9,289	31.2	▼1.6	8,924	29.8	▼0.4
SPD	Ina Muhß	8,552	28.7	▲0.2	9,830	32.8	▲0.9
CDU	Jan Redmann	6,878	23.1	▼0.1	6,138	20.5	▲0.2
FDP	Jens Engelhardt	1,722	5.8	▼0.1	2,095	7.0	▲3.1
BVB/FW	Berndt Dannemann	1,370	4.6		676	2.3	
Greens	Franz Josef Conraths	1,203	4.0	▲1.7	988	3.3	▲1.2
NPD	Lore Lierse	780	2.6		708	2.4	
DVU					240	0.8	▼4.1
RRP					127	0.4	
50Plus					83	0.3	▼0.1
Die-Volksinitiative					78	0.3	
REP					27	0.1	
DKP					25	0.1	Steady
Informal votes		967			822		
Total valid votes		29,794			29,939		
Turnout		30,761	62.4	▲9.0			
Left hold	Majority	737	2.5	▼1.8			

=== 2004 election ===
State election (2004): Prignitz II/ Ostprignitz-Ruppin II
Notes:	Blue background denotes the winner of the electorate vote. Pink background denotes a candidate elected from their party list. Yellow background denotes an electorate win by a list member, or other incumbent. A ✓ or ✗ denotes status of any incumbent, win or lose respectively.						
Party	Candidate	Votes	%	±%	Party votes	%	±%
PDS	Wolfgang Gehrcke-Reymann	8,773	32.76		8,115	30.16	
SPD	Robert Gemmel	7,623	28.46		8,597	31.95	
CDU	Dieter Helm	6,220	23.22		5,464	20.31	
FDP	Chris Krassowski	1,579	5.90		1,062	3.95	
DVU					1,318	4.90	
AUB-Brandenburg	Cornelia Wreidt	742	2.77		272	1.01	
Familie					688	2.56	
Greens	Dietmar Strehl	606	2.26		565	2.10	
Yes Brandenburg	Mathias Wirth	472	1.76		245	0.91	
AfW (Free Voters)	Ilona Gottschalk	450	1.68		171	0.64	
Schill	Volker Schulz	194	0.72		45	0.17	
The Grays – Gray Panthers					150	0.56	
Independent	Herbert Mathwig	123	0.46				
50Plus					110	0.41	
BRB					84	0.31	
DKP					23	0.09	
Informal votes		663			536		
Total valid votes		26,782			26,909		
Turnout		27,445	53.42				
PDS win new seat	Majority	1,150	4.30				

== See also ==
- Politics of Brandenburg
- Landtag of Brandenburg
