= Sabine Kunst =

German engineer, academic and politician

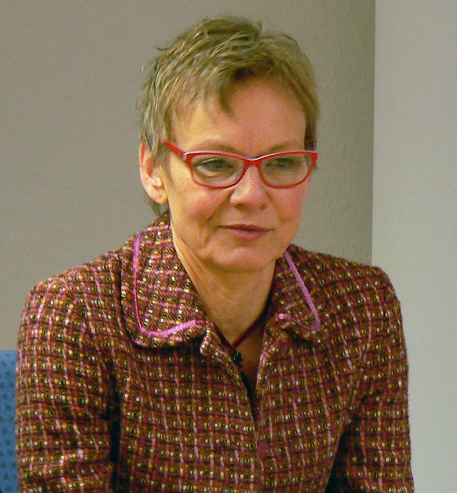

President of Humboldt University
- Incumbent
- Assumed office 19 January 2016

Personal details
- Born: 30 December 1954 (age 71) Wesselburen, Germany
- Children: 3
- Occupation: Academic

Sabine Kunst (born 30 December 1954) is a German engineer, academic and politician who has been serving as chairwoman of the Joachim Herz Foundation since 2022.

Kunst served as president of Humboldt University from 2016 until 2021, when she announced her resignation over the reform of the Berlin university law. Since 2014, she has been a member of the Social Democratic Party of Germany (SPD).

== Education ==
- 1990: Habilitation in civil engineering
- 1990: PhD in political science
- 1982: PhD in civil engineering

== Political career ==
From 2010 to 2011, Kunst served as president of the German Academic Exchange Service (DAAD); she was the first woman to hold that office. She unsuccessfully applied for the position as president of the University of Leipzig in 2010; instead, the position went to Beate Schücking.

From 2011 to 2016, Kunst served as State Minister of Science, Research and Culture in the government of Brandenburg, in the governments of successive Ministers-President Matthias Platzeck and Dietmar Woidke.

== Other activities ==
- Hasso Plattner Foundation, Member of the Foundation Council (since 2023)
- German Institute for International and Security Affairs (SWP), Member of the Council (since 2022)
- Berlin Institute of Health (BIH), Member of the Supervisory Board
- Deutsches Herzzentrum Berlin, Member of the Board of Trustees
- Foundation for the Humboldt Forum in the Berlin Palace, Member of the Council
- Fraunhofer Institute for Applied Polymer Research (IAP), Member of the Advisory Board
- German Institute for Economic Research (DIW), Member of the Board of Trustees
- German-Polish Science Foundation (DPWS), Member of the Board
- Leibniz Centre for Contemporary History, Member of the Board of Trustees
- Leo Baeck Foundation, Member of the Board of Trustees
- Max Delbrück Center for Molecular Medicine in the Helmholtz Association (MDC), Member of the Supervisory Board
- Max Planck Society, Member of the Senate
- Max Planck Institute for Gravitational Physics, Member of the Board of Trustees
- Natural History Museum, Berlin, Member of the Board of Trustees
- Potsdam Institute for Climate Impact Research (PIK), Member of the Board of Trustees
- Stiftung St. Matthäus, Evangelical Church in Berlin, Brandenburg and Silesian Upper Lusatia, Member of the Board of Trustees
- Stephanus-Stiftung, Member of the Board of Trustees
- University of Lübeck, Member of the Board of Trustees
- Urania Berlin, Member of the Board of Trustees
- Weizenbaum Institute, Member of the Board of Trustees
- Berlin Social Science Center (WZB), Member of the Board of Trustees

== Recognition ==
- 2013 – Honorary doctorate, American Jewish University

== Personal life ==
Kunst is married and has three children. The family has been living in Werder, Havel since 2007. Her sister is Kirsten Fehrs.
