= Katrin Lange =

German politician (born 1971)

Member of Landtag of Brandenburg
- Incumbent
- Assumed office 22 September 2024

Minister of the Interior and for Local Affairs of Brandenburg
- In office 11 December 2024 – 16 May 2025
- Preceded by: Michael Stübgen
- Succeeded by: René Wilke

Minister of Finance and for Europe of Brandenburg
- In office 2019–2024
- Preceded by: Christian Görke
- Succeeded by: Robert Crumbach

Personal details
- Born: Katrin Hofmeister; 24 December 1971 (age 54) Brandenburg an der Havel, Germany (then East Germany)
- Party: SPD (1995-present)

Katrin Lange (née Hofmeister; born 24 December 1971) is a German politician from the Social Democratic Party of Germany (SPD). She has been Minister of the Interior and for Local Affairs in the state of Brandenburg in the fourth Woidke cabinet since 2024. Before that, she was Minister of Finance and for Europe in the third Woidke cabinet from 2019 to 2024 and State Secretary in the Ministry of the Interior and for Local Affairs of Brandenburg from 2016 to 2019. She has been a member of the Landtag of Brandenburg since 2024.

== Biography ==
Katrin Lange was born Katrin Hofmeister, as her parents did not get married until 1975. After graduating from a polytechnic secondary school, she completed vocational training at the VEB Bau- und Montagekombinat Ost in Brandenburg (Havel) from 1988 to 1991, graduating with a high school diploma as a construction worker in concrete and reinforced concrete. Katrin Lange then began training as an office worker in the Ministry of the Interior of the State of Brandenburg (1991–1993). This was followed by positions as an employee in the building authority of Kyritz district and Ostprignitz-Ruppin district (1993–1994) and in the Ministry of the Interior of the State of Brandenburg (1994–1997), as well as head of the public order office of the Meyenburg district (1997–2001).

Between 2001 and 2004, she was head of the main and regulatory office of the Meyenburg district. In 2002, she also completed part-time training at the Brandenburg Municipal Academy to become an administrative specialist. In 2004, she became district director (Amtsdirektor) of the Meyenburg district. She held this position until 2014. From 2005 to 2014, Lange was also 1st deputy chairwoman and spokesperson for the “Wachstumskern Autobahndreieck Wittstock/Dosse e. V.”.

Katrin Lange joined the SPD in 1995 and has been deputy chairwoman of the SPD Brandenburg since 2013.

On 11 November 2014, Katrin Lange was appointed State Secretary in the Ministry of Infrastructure and Regional Planning of the State of Brandenburg under Minister Kathrin Schneider, who had previously held the post in the first Woidke cabinet. On 12 April 2016, she became State Secretary in the Brandenburg Minister of the Interior and for Local Affairs under Minister Karl-Heinz Schröter. Lange succeeded Matthias Kahl, who retired due to health problems. Ines Jesse took over Lange's post in the Ministry of Infrastructure and Regional Planning. From 20 November 2019 to 11 December 2024, she was Minister of Finance and for Europe of the State of Brandenburg in the third Woidke cabinet. After the resignation of Axel Vogel, she was also acting head of the Ministry of Agriculture, Environment and Climate Protection of the State of Brandenburg from 25 November 2024 to 13 December 2024. On 11 December 2024, she was appointed Minister of the Interior and for Local Affairs of the State of Brandenburg in the fourth Woidke cabinet.

In the 2019 Brandenburg state election, Lange was elected to the state parliament via a direct mandate in the Prignitz II/Ostprignitz-Ruppin II state constituency. In the 2024 state election, she lost the direct mandate in the Prignitz II/Ostprignitz-Ruppin II constituency to Torsten Arndt from the Alternative for Germany (AfD), but was re-elected to the Landtag via the state list.

In an interview with Deutschlandfunk in 2022, Lange stated in connection with the sanctions against Russia since the invasion of Ukraine: "We are not obliged to harm ourselves".

== Personal life ==
Katrin Lange lives in the Beveringen district of the town of Pritzwalk and is the mother of a son (born 1999).
