= Manja Schüle =

German politician

Manja Schüle MdL
- Schüle in 2025

Minister for Science, Research and Culture of Brandenburg
- Incumbent
- Assumed office 20 November 2019
- Minister-President: Dietmar Woidke
- Preceded by: Martina Münch

Member of Landtag of Brandenburg; for Potsdam I
- Incumbent
- Assumed office 17 October 2024
- Preceded by: Marie Schäffer

Member of the Bundestag; for Potsdam – Potsdam-Mittelmark II – Teltow-Fläming II
- In office 24 October 2017 – 2 December 2019
- Preceded by: Katherina Reiche (2015)
- Succeeded by: Sylvia Lehmann

Personal details
- Born: Manja Orlowski; 4 August 1976 (age 50) Frankfurt (Oder), East Germany
- Party: Social Democratic (since 1996)
- Children: 1
- Education: University of Potsdam

Manja Schüle (née Orlowski; born 4 August 1976) is a German politician from the Social Democratic Party of Germany (SPD). She has been Minister for Science, Research and Culture of the State of Brandenburg since 2019. From 2017 to 2019 she was a member of the German Bundestag. Since the 2024 Brandenburg state election she has been a member of the Landtag of Brandenburg.

== Early life and education ==
Manja Schüle was born on 4 August 1976 in Frankfurt (Oder) and grew up there. In 1996 she moved to Potsdam. She studied at the University of Potsdam and completed her studies in political science in 2006 as a doctoral scholarship holder of the Friedrich Ebert Foundation with a dissertation on political education, earning her doctorate.

== Early career ==
From 1997 to 2006 she worked for Ingrid Siebke (MdL), Christel Redepenning (MdL) and Norbert Glante (MEP). From 2007 to 2008 she was a lecturer at the University of Potsdam at the chair of Werner Jann. At the same time, from 2006 to 2009 she worked as an advisor for education, youth and sport for the SPD parliamentary group in Brandenburg. In 2009 she became office manager for Minister Günter Baaske in the Ministry of Labour, Social Affairs, Women and Family of the State of Brandenburg and remained his office manager when Baaske became Minister for Education, Youth and Sport in Brandenburg in 2014.

== Political career ==
=== Early beginnings ===
Schüle has been involved with the Jusos, the youth organization of the Social Democratic Party of Germany, since 1996. Among other things, she was deputy state chairwoman of the Jusos in Brandenburg and active in the Juso university group at the University of Potsdam.

Schüle has been a member of the SPD since 1998. Since 2011, she has been an advisory member of the state executive committee of the SPD Brandenburg - including several years since 2011 as state chairwoman of the Working Group for Education in the SPD in Brandenburg. From 2008 to 2012, Schüle was a city councillor in the state capital Potsdam. For professional reasons, Schüle gave up her mandate as city councillor in 2012 and was then appointed as a knowledgeable resident to the Committee for Education and Sport, on which she was a member until the 2014 local elections.

=== Member of the German Parliament (2017–2019) ===
After an internal party selection process, Schüle was nominated as the SPD's direct candidate for the election to the German Bundestag in the Potsdam – Potsdam-Mittelmark II – Teltow-Fläming II constituency at a constituency delegate conference on 26 September 2016. In the federal election on 24 September 2017, she won the direct mandate with 26.1% of the first votes. During her time in parliament, Schüle was a full member of the Committee on Education, Research and Technology Assessment of the German Bundestag and a deputy member of the Committee on Economic Affairs and Energy as well as the Enquete Commission "Artificial Intelligence - Social Responsibility and Economic, Social and Ecological Potentials".

=== Career in state politics ===
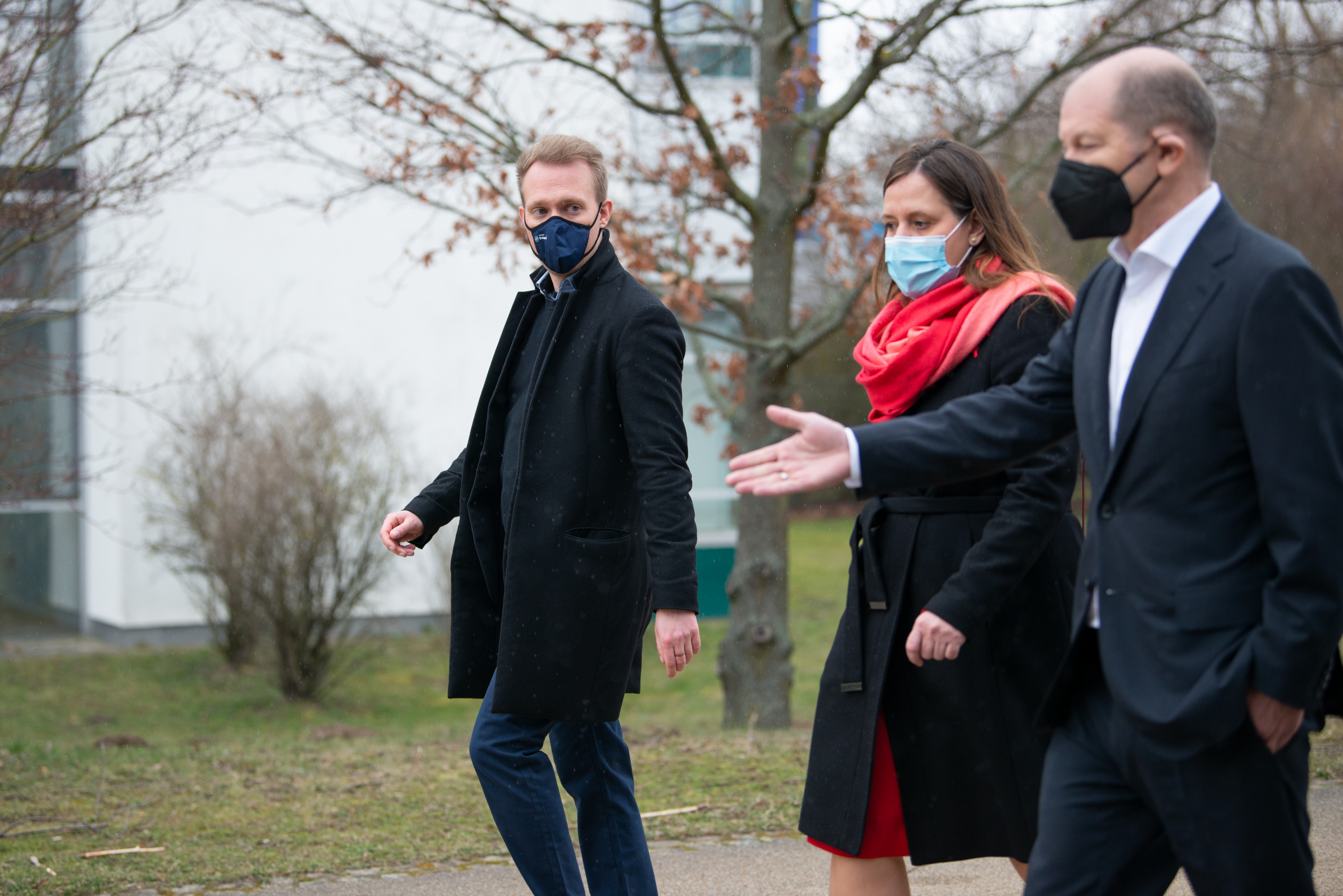
Schüle (centre) with Nico Marquardt and Olaf Scholz in 2021

On 20 November 2019, Schüle was appointed Minister for Science, Research and Culture of the State of Brandenburg in the third Woidke cabinet. She then resigned from her Bundestag mandate on 2 December. Her successor was Sylvia Lehmann.

In the 2024 Brandenburg state election, Schüle won the direct mandate in the Potsdam I state constituency with 34.4% of the first votes and entered the Landtag of Brandenburg.

On 11 December 2024, Schüle was reappointed Minister for Science, Research and Culture of the State of Brandenburg in the fourth Woidke cabinet.

In the negotiations to form a Grand Coalition under the leadership of Friedrich Merz's Christian Democrats (CDU together with the Bavarian CSU) and the SPD following the 2025 German elections, Schüle was part of the SPD delegation in the working group on economic affairs, industry and tourism, led by Jens Spahn, Hansjörg Durz and Alexander Schweitzer.

== Other activities ==
Schüle is a member of the board of the Friedrich Ebert Foundation (FES) and a senator of the Max Planck Society. She is also a member of the political advisory board of the SPD Economic Forum and the German Parliamentary Society (DPG).

Schüle is socially active through her membership in the Workers' Welfare Association (AWO), IG Metall, the German Association for Political Education Deutsche (DvpB), the New Potsdam Edict of Tolerance association and as a jury member for the Regine Hildebrandt Prize of the SPD.

In addition, Schüle is a founding member of the Local Alliance for Families Potsdam North-West and a member of the Social Democratic Community for Local Politics (SGK) , the German-Israeli Society (DIG), the University Society Potsdam e. V. and the Friends Association of the Potsdam Museum.

== Personal life ==
Schüle is married. She lives in Potsdam-Babelsberg and is the mother of one child.

== Publications ==
- Orlowski, Manja und Kaufmann, Tobias (Hrsg.): „Ich würde mich auch wehren...“ Antisemitismus und Israelkritik nach Möllemann. (Aufsatzsammlung), Weber, Potsdam 2002, ISBN 3-936130-04-3.
- Orlowski, Manja: Das Unterrichtsfach „Politische Bildung“ in Brandenburg – Eine qualitative und quantitative Studie. Logos Verlag, Berlin 2006, ISBN 978-3-8325-1231-6 (zugleich Dissertation an der Universität Potsdam).
