= Second Woidke cabinet =

State government of Brandenburg from 2014 to 2019

Second Cabinet of Dietmar Woidke Woidke II
- 8th Cabinet of Brandenburg
- 5 November 2014 – 19 November 2019
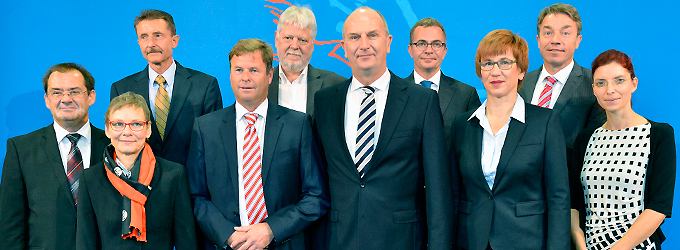
- The members of the second Woidke cabinet in March 2016. Left to right: Jörg Vogelsänger, Sabine Kunst, Karl-Heinz Schröter, Christian Görke, Helmuth Markov, Dietmar Woidke, Albrecht Gerber, Kathrin Schneider, Günter Baaske, Diana Golze
- Date formed: 5 November 2014
- Date dissolved: 19 November 2019

People and organisations
- Minister-President: Dietmar Woidke
- Deputy Minister-President: Christian Görke
- No. of ministers: 9
- Member parties: Social Democratic Party; The Left
- Status in legislature: Coalition government (Majority)
- Opposition parties: Christian Democratic Union; Alternative for Germany; Alliance 90/The Greens; BVB/Free Voters

History
- Election: 2014 Brandenburg state election
- Legislature term: 6th Landtag of Brandenburg
- Predecessor: First Woidke cabinet
- Successor: Third Woidke cabinet

The Second Woidke cabinet was the state government of Brandenburg between 2014 and 2019, sworn in on 5 November 2014 after Dietmar Woidke was elected as Minister-President of Brandenburg by the members of the Landtag of Brandenburg. It was the 8th Cabinet of Brandenburg.

It was formed after the 2014 Brandenburg state election by the Social Democratic Party (SPD) and The Left. Excluding the Minister-President, the cabinet comprised nine ministers. Six were members of the SPD and three were members of The Left.

The second Woidke cabinet was succeeded by the third Woidke cabinet on 20 November 2019.

== Formation ==
The previous cabinet was a coalition government of the SPD and The Left led by Minister-President Dietmar Woidke of the SPD, who took office in August 2013.

The election took place on 14 September 2014, and resulted in a slight decline for the SPD significant losses for The Left. The opposition CDU rose from third to second place on a modest swing, while the AfD debuted at 12%. The Greens remained steady on 6%, and the FDP fell to 1.5%, losing all their seats. The BVB/FW won a direct constituency in Teltow-Fläming, which enabled them to bypass the 5% electoral threshold and win three seats with 2.7% of votes.

Overall, the incumbent coalition retained a significantly reduced majority of 47 seats out of 88, a margin of three seats. The SPD held exploratory talks with both the CDU and The Left before beginning negotiations to renew their coalition with the latter. The two parties presented their 70-page coalition agreement on 10 October. Compared to the previous cabinet, the SPD gained an additional cabinet position for a total of seven (including the Minister-President), while The Left lost one for a total of three.

Woidke was elected as Minister-President by the Landtag on 5 November, winning 47 votes out of 88 cast.

== Composition ==
The composition of the cabinet at the time of its dissolution was as follows:

Portfolio	Minister	Party	Took office	Left office	State secretaries
Minister-President; State Chancellery	Dietmar Woidke born 22 October 1961	SPD	5 November 2014	19 November 2019	Martin Gorholt (Head of the State Chancellery); Thomas Kralinski (Media and Int'l Affairs, Representative to the Federal Government); Rainer Bretschneider (Airport Coordinator)
Deputy Minister-President Minister for Finance	Christian Görke born 17 March 1962	LINKE	5 November 2014	19 November 2019	Daniela Trochowski
Minister for Interior and Communities	Karl-Heinz Schröter born 26 October 1954	SPD	5 November 2014	19 November 2019	Katrin Lange
Minister for Justice, Europe and Consumer Protection	Helmuth Markov born 5 June 1952	LINKE	5 November 2014	22 April 2016	Ronald Pienkny (Justice); Anne Quart (Europe and Consumer Protection)
Minister for Justice, Europe and Consumer Protection	Stefan Ludwig born 26 April 1967	LINKE	28 April 2016	19 November 2019	Ronald Pienkny (Justice); Anne Quart (Europe and Consumer Protection)
Minister for Labour, Social Affairs, Health, Women and Family	Diana Golze born 18 June 1975	LINKE	5 November 2014	28 August 2018	Almuth Hartwig-Tiedt
Minister for Labour, Social Affairs, Health, Women and Family	Susanna Karawanskij born 7 May 1980	LINKE	19 September 2018	19 November 2019	Andreas Büttner
Minister for Economics and Energy	Albrecht Gerber born 2 April 1967	SPD	5 November 2014	19 September 2018	Hendrik Fischer
Minister for Economics and Energy	Jörg Steinbach born 28 May 1956	SPD	19 September 2018	19 November 2019	Hendrik Fischer
Minister for Education, Youth and Sport	Günter Baaske born 17 October 1957	SPD	5 November 2014	28 September 2017	Thomas Drescher
Minister for Education, Youth and Sport	Britta Ernst born 23 February 1961	SPD	28 September 2017	19 November 2019	Thomas Drescher
Minister for Rural Development, Environment and Agriculture	Jörg Vogelsänger born 17 May 1964	SPD	5 November 2014	19 November 2019	Carolin Schilde
Minister for Infrastructure and State Planning	Kathrin Schneider born 30 September 1962	SPD	5 November 2014	19 November 2019	Ines Jesse
Minister for Science, Research and Culture	Sabine Kunst born 30 December 1954	SPD	5 November 2014	8 March 2016	Martin Gorholt
Minister for Science, Research and Culture	Martina Münch born 29 December 1961	SPD	9 March 2016	19 November 2019	Ulrike Gutheil
