= Hanka Mittelstädt =

German politician (born 1987)

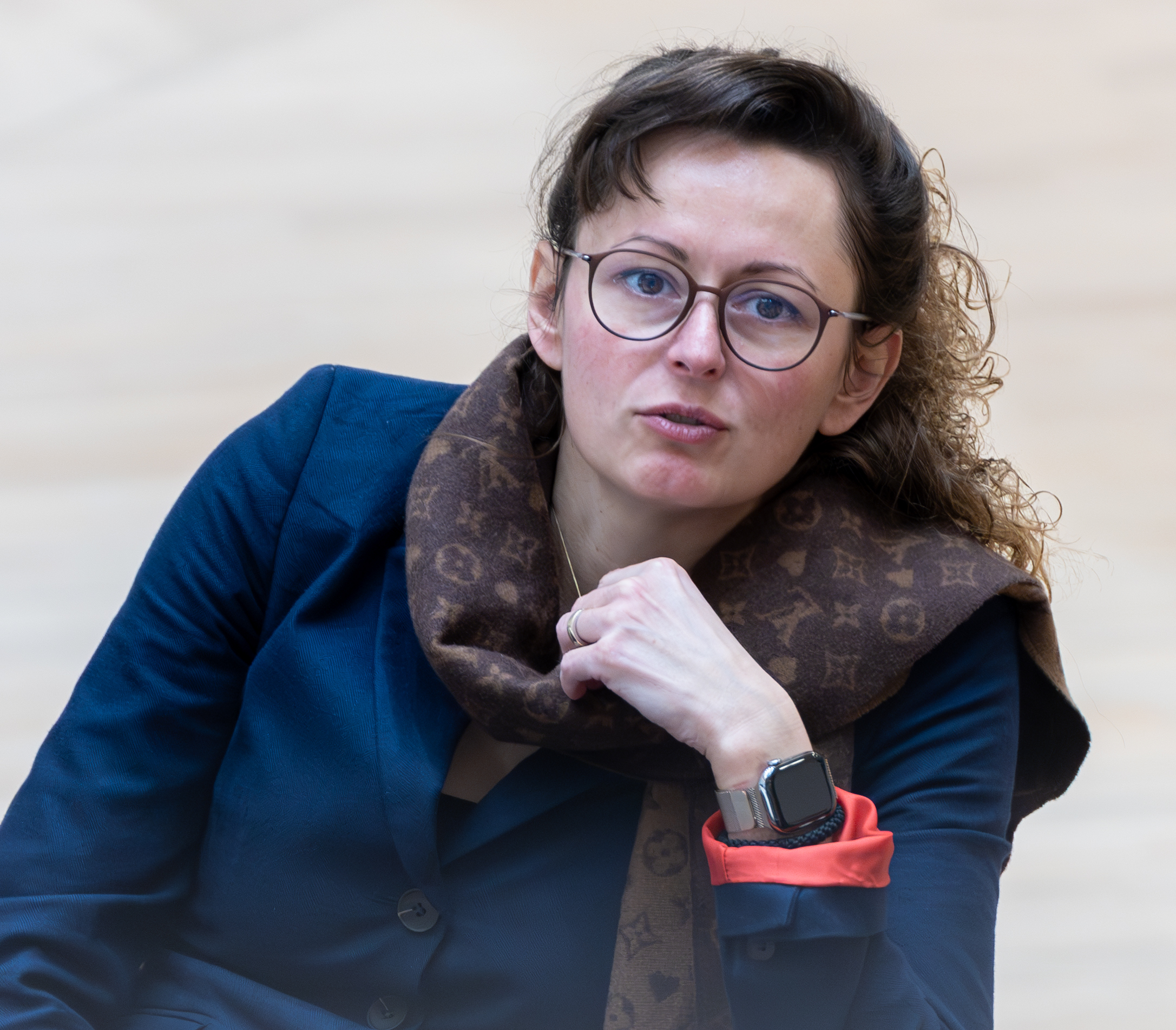

Member of Landtag of Brandenburg
- Incumbent
- Assumed office 22 March 2023

Minister for Agriculture and Food, Environment and Consumer Protection of the State of Brandenburg
- Incumbent
- Assumed office 13 December 2024

Personal details
- Born: 28 April 1987 (age 39) Prenzlau, Bezirk Neubrandenburg, East Germany (now Germany)
- Party: SPD

Hanka Mittelstädt (born 28 April 1987) is a German politician from the Social Democratic Party of Germany (SPD). She has been Minister for Agriculture and Food, Environment and Consumer Protection in the state of Brandenberg since 2024 and a member of the Landtag of Brandenburg since 2023.

== Life ==
Mittelstädt graduated from high school in her hometown of Prenzlau in 2006. She then studied agricultural economics at the Neubrandenburg University of Applied Sciences from 2006 to 2009. She graduated with a Bachelor of Science. From 2010 to 2011 she studied agricultural economics at the Christian-Albrechts University of Kiel. She graduated with a Master of Science. From 2012 to 2015 she worked as a corporate customer advisor for agriculture at Deutsche Kreditbank and Bankhaus Rautenschlein. In 2015 she took over her parents' farm and has been running it ever since. She founded Ucker-Ei GmbH, which keeps free-range laying hens and markets the eggs. She has also been a volunteer board member of the Brandenburg branch of the German Rural Women's Association since 2016 and chairwoman of the agricultural marketing organization Pro Agro since 2017.

Mittelstädt is an Evangelical Protestant

== Political career ==
Mittelstädt has been a member of the SPD since 2019. She has also been a member of the municipal council (Kreistag) of Nordwestuckermark and a member of the district council of the Uckermark district since 2019. From 2021 to 2024 she was chairwoman of the SPD parliamentary group in the district council.

In the 2019 Brandenburg state election, Mittelstädt ran in the Uckermark I state constituency and in 20th place on her party's state list, but initially failed to gain entry into the state parliament. On 22 March 2023, she replaced Inka Gossmann-Reetz in the state parliament. Until the state election on September 22, she was a member of the Infrastructure and Regional Planning Committee and a member of the Petitions Committee. In the 2024 Brandenburg state election, she was able to significantly improve her election result, but missed the direct mandate. She was re-entered into the state parliament via 12th place on the SPD state list.

On 13 December 2024, Mittelstädt was appointed Minister for Agriculture and Food, Environment and Consumer Protection of the State of Brandenburg in the Fourth Woidke cabinet. Her appointment took place two days after the formation of the cabinet on 11 December 2024, as Mittelstädt was still the notarized managing director of Ucker-Ei GmbH at the time the government was formed.
