= Kathrin Schneider =

German politician (born 1962)

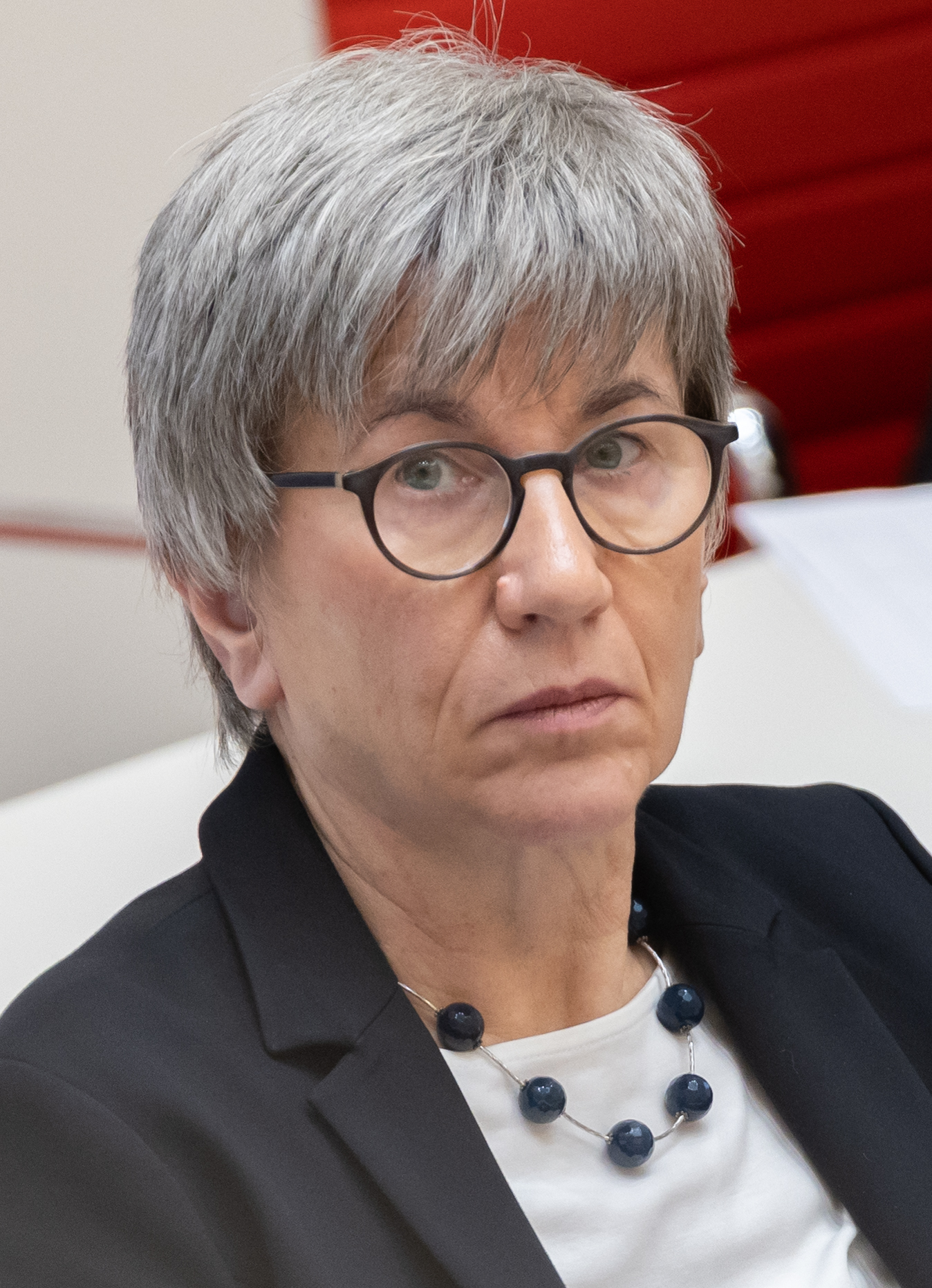
- Kathrin Schneider in 2025

Head of the Brandenburg State Chancellery
- Incumbent
- Assumed office 20 November 2019

Minister for Infrastructure and Regional Planning of Brandenburg
- In office 5 November 2014 – 20 November 2019

Personal details
- Born: 30 September 1962 (age 64) Lübben (Spreewald), Germany (then East Germany)
- Party: SPD (2015-present)
- Other political affiliations: Independent (until 2015)
- Education: Humboldt University of Berlin

Kathrin Schneider (born 30 September 1962) is a German politician from the Social Democratic Party of Germany (SPD). She was Minister for Infrastructure and Regional Planning of the State of Brandenburg from 5 November 2014 to 20 November 2019. Since 20 November 2019, she has been head of the Brandenburg State Chancellery with the rank of minister.

== Life and career ==
In 1981, Kathrin Schneider began studying agricultural sciences with a focus on plant production at the Humboldt University of Berlin, which she completed in 1986 with a degree in agricultural engineering. She then worked for the district planning commission of the Cottbus district council. After reunification, in 1990 she moved to the mining department of the Cottbus district administration authority.

In 1992 she began working as a consultant for lignite and remediation planning in the Joint Regional Planning Department Berlin-Brandenburg in the Brandenburg Ministry for the Environment, Nature Conservation and Regional Planning, and took over as head of the department in 2002. In 2003 she also became head of the department for adapting urban development planning. In 2005 she moved to the department for budget, fundamental financial issues, financial auditing and EU affairs in the Brandenburg Ministry for Infrastructure and Regional Planning, until she finally became head of the Joint Regional Planning Department Berlin-Brandenburg in the Ministry for Infrastructure and Regional Planning/Ministry for Infrastructure and Agriculture in 2009. From 13 December 2010 to 18 March 2013 she was also chairwoman of the "Berlin Schönefeld Airport Noise Commission".

Kathrin Schneider has two children and lives in Märkische Heide.

== Public offices ==
On 30 January 2013, Kathrin Schneider was appointed State Secretary in the Ministry of Infrastructure and Agriculture of the State of Brandenburg, headed by Jörg Vogelsänger.

After the 2014 Brandenburg state election, she was appointed Minister for Infrastructure and Regional Planning by Minister-president Dietmar Woidke on 5 November 2014. She held this office until 20 November 2019. On 20 November 2019, she was appointed head of the Brandenburg State Chancellery with the rank of minister. After the dismissal of Ursula Nonnemacher, Schneider was acting head of the Ministry of Social Affairs Health, Integration and Consumer Protection of the State of Brandenburg from 25 November 2024 to 11 December 2024.

Kathrin Schneider came to the ministerial office as an independent politician on the recommendation of the SPD Brandenburg and joined the SPD in November 2015.

== See also ==
- Kabinett Woidke II
- Kabinett Woidke III
- Kabinett Woidke IV
