= Matthias Platzeck =

German politician

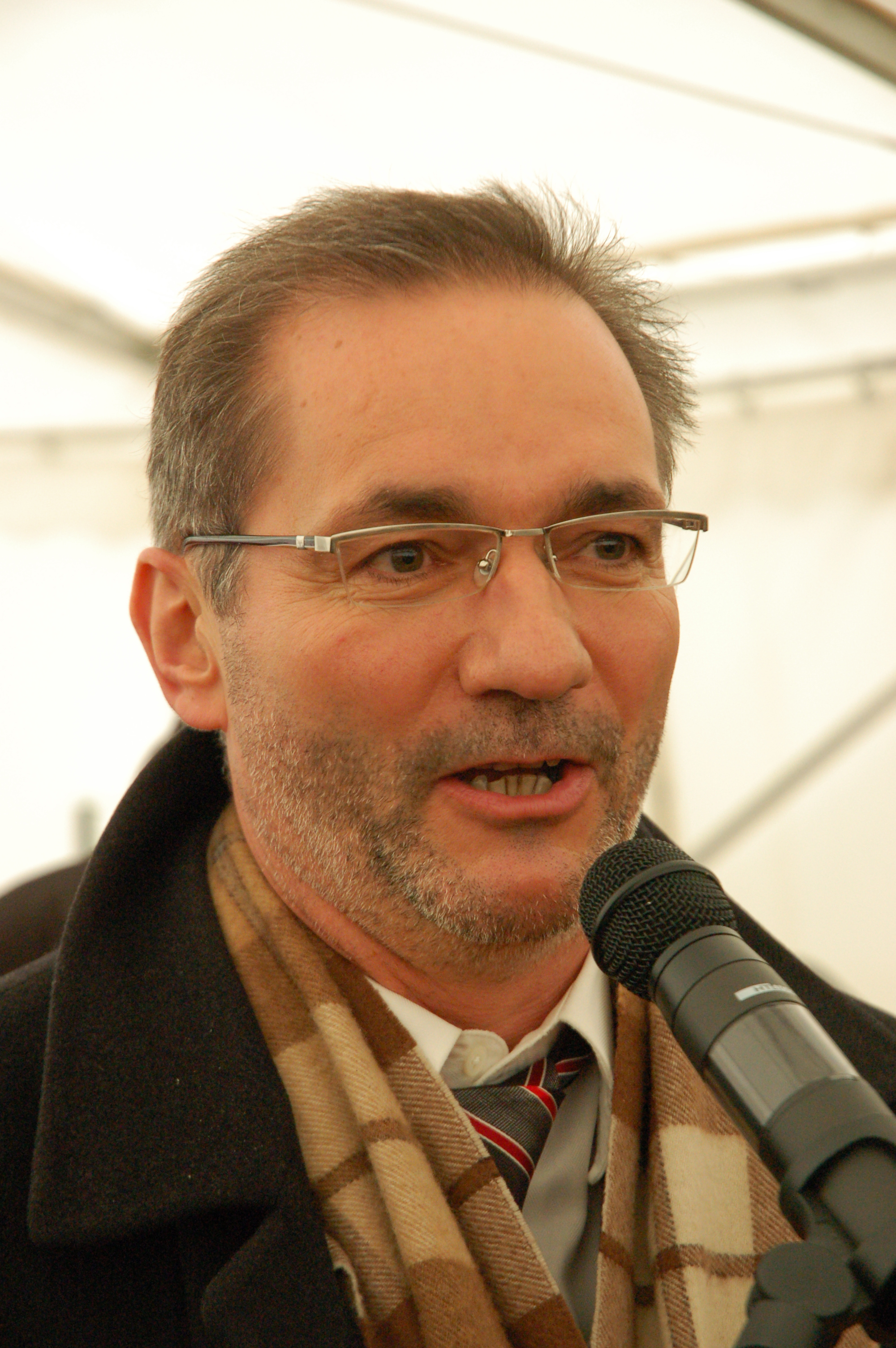
- Platzeck in 2009

Leader of the Social Democratic Party
- In office 16 November 2005 – 10 April 2006
- General Secretary: Hubertus Heil
- Preceded by: Franz Müntefering
- Succeeded by: Kurt Beck

Minister-President of Brandenburg
- In office 26 June 2002 – 28 August 2013
- Deputy: Jörg Schönbohm; Ulrich Junghanns; Johanna Wanka; Helmuth Markov
- Preceded by: Manfred Stolpe
- Succeeded by: Dietmar Woidke

President of the Bundesrat
- In office 1 November 2004 – 31 October 2005
- First Vice President: Dieter Althaus
- Preceded by: Dieter Althaus
- Succeeded by: Peter Harry Carstensen

Mayor of Potsdam
- In office 4 November 1998 – 26 June 2002
- Preceded by: Horst Gramlich
- Succeeded by: Jann Jakobs

Minister for the Environment, Nature Conservation and Regional Planning of Brandenburg
- In office 22 November 1990 – 3 November 1998
- Minister-President: Manfred Stolpe
- Preceded by: Office established
- Succeeded by: Eberhard Henne

Member of the Landtag of Brandenburg for Uckermark I (Potsdam II; 2004–2009) (Alliance 90/The Greens List; 1990–1992)
- In office 13 October 2004 – 8 October 2014
- Preceded by: Lothar Bisky
- Succeeded by: Uwe Schmidt
- In office 26 October 1990 – 30 September 1992
- Preceded by: Constituency established
- Succeeded by: Carmen Kirmes
Offices held, 1989–1990
Member of the Bundestag for Volkskammer
In office 3 October 1990 – 20 December 1990
Preceded by	Constituency established
Succeeded by	Constituency abolished
Minister without Portfolio
In office 5 February 1990 – 12 April 1990
Chairman of the Council of Ministers	Hans Modrow
Preceded by	Position abolished
Succeeded by	Position established
Member of the Volkskammer for Potsdam
In office 5 April 1990 – 2 October 1990
Preceded by	Constituency established
Succeeded by	Constituency abolished

Personal details
- Born: 29 December 1953 (age 72) Potsdam, East Germany (now Germany)
- Party: Social Democratic Party (1995–)
- Other political affiliations: Independent (1993–1995); Alliance 90 (1990–1993); East German Green Party (1990); Liberal Democratic Party of Germany (1989)
- Spouses: Ute Bankwitz (m. 1978; div. 1984); Jeanette Jesorka (m. 2007)
- Children: 3
- Education: Technische Universität Ilmenau
- Occupation: Politician; environmental hygienist
- Website: Brandenburgische Landeszentrale für politische Bildung website

Military service
- Allegiance: East Germany
- Branch/service: National People's Army
- Years of service: 1972–1974

Matthias Platzeck (born 29 December 1953) is a German politician. He was minister-president of Brandenburg from 2002 to 2013 and party chairman of the SPD from November 2005 to April 2006.

On 29 July 2013, Platzeck announced his resignation from office in August for health reasons.

After he left party politics, he became known for his contacts to Russia and, following the beginning of the Russo-Ukrainian War in 2014, he was repeatedly criticized for his pro-Russian statements.

== Early life and education ==
Platzeck was born in Potsdam, the son of a physician and a medical-technical assistant. After attending Polytechnic Secondary School in Potsdam from 1960 to 1966, he went through Extended Secondary School in Kleinmachnow. Following his Abitur in 1972 and military service he studied biomedical cybernetics at the Technische Universität Ilmenau from 1974 onward. After his diploma in 1979, Platzeck worked at the institute for hygiene in Karl-Marx-Stadt (today Chemnitz) in 1979–1980 and the general hospital in Bad Freienwalde from 1980 to 1982. From 1982 to 1990 he was head of the department for environmental hygiene at the agency for hygiene in Potsdam.

== Political career ==
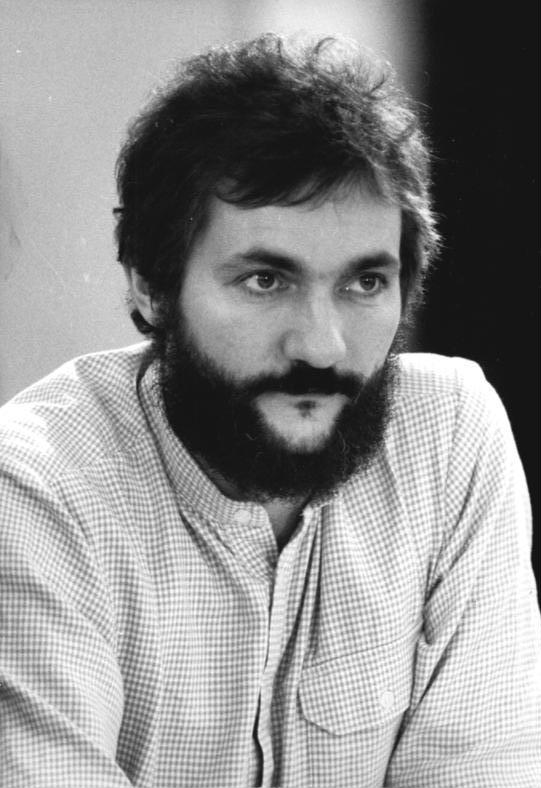
Platzeck in 1991

Platzeck co-founded ARGUS, a Potsdam environmental organization, with and at the initiative of Carola Stabe in April 1988. In April 1989, he joined the Liberal Democratic Party of Germany but left it shortly thereafter. He represented ARGUS at the founding of the Grüne Liga association of local environmental organizations in East Germany in November 1989. During the Peaceful Revolution he was their speaker at the East German Round Table talks. From February to April 1990 he represented the oppositional radical Green Party as Minister without Portfolio in the last non-elected but legitimate government of the GDR. Platzeck was elected member of the Volkskammer in 1990 for the Green Party and was parliamentary secretary of the joined faction of Greens and Alliance 90.

After German reunification, he was one of 144 members of the Volkskammer co-opted to the Bundestag. He did not run for a full term in the 1990 German federal election.

In October 1990 Platzeck became a member of the Landtag of Brandenburg for Alliance 90. He was Minister for the Environment in a coalition government with the SPD and FDP from 1990 to 1994, when the coalition broke up. Rejecting the merger of his party with the West German Green Party he did not join Alliance 90/The Greens in 1993. Instead, he became a member of the SPD on 6 June 1995.

After the break of the Brandenburg coalition in 1994 Platzeck left his faction and remained Minister for the Environment under minister-president Manfred Stolpe. He became popular nationwide for organizing public support for the affected population during a flood of the Oder river in 1997. In 1998 he was elected mayor of Brandenburg's capital Potsdam and rejected the offer of Chancellor Gerhard Schröder to join the federal cabinet as Minister for Transport.

In 2000 Platzeck was elected chairman of the SPD in Brandenburg and in 2002 he succeeded Manfred Stolpe as Minister-president. He was re-elected to the Landtag (state parliament) in 2004. With the SPD as strongest political force he could continue his coalition with the CDU. He served as President of the Bundesrat from 2004 to 2005.

When Franz Müntefering resigned as party chairman of the SPD because of internal conflicts, Platzeck was elected party chairman on 15 November 2005 with an overwhelming majority of 99.8 percent. In January, February and April 2006 Platzeck suffered three severe cases of hearing loss. Due to his ill health he resigned from his post as chairman on 10 April 2006, only five months after becoming chairman.

== Life after politics ==
In 2014 Platzeck became chairman of the German-Russian Forum, with some 350 members at the time. In this function he hosted Vladimir Yakunin (a confidant of Russian president Vladimir Putin) as a guest. During his 2014 speech to the German-Russian Forum, Yakunin made several homophobic statements, alleged that the European Union was controlled by the United States and spoke in support of the Russo-Ukrainian war. Platzeck criticised Yakunin's homophobia, but did not condemn his other views. At the same time, Platzeck expressed support for the Russian annexation of Crimea, denying that it was in violation of international law. At another meeting with Yakunin on the island of Rhodes in September 2014, Platzeck called for international recognition of the Russian annexation of Crimea and expressed support for Russian annexation of the Donbas region.

Both in 2015 and 2016, Platzeck and Bodo Ramelow were appointed as unpaid arbitrators for negotiations between Deutsche Bahn and the German Train Drivers' Union (GDL). In 2016, he also served as unpaid arbitrator for negotiations between German airline Lufthansa and its flight attendants' union.

From 2018 until 2019, Platzeck co-chaired the German government's so-called coal commission, which is tasked to develop a masterplan before the end of the year on how to phase-out coal and create a new economic perspective for the country's coal-mining regions.

In 2018, after the poisoning of Sergei and Yulia Skripal in England, Platzeck objected the expulsion of Russian diplomats by Western nations and doubted the findings of the United Kingdom's security services. Later that year, he was awarded the Order of Friendship in a ceremony held in the Russian embassy in Berlin.

In 2019, Platzeck was appointed by the Federal Ministry of the Interior, Building and Community to chair the committee that oversaw the preparations for the 30th anniversary of German reunification.

In late 2020, Platzeck was appointed as arbitrator in a conflict between Charité and the United Services Trade Union (ver.di); negotiations were successfully concluded by February 2021. Following her election as Governing Mayor of Berlin in September 2021, Franziska Giffey mandated Platzeck with helping to end a six-weeks long strike of Vivantes Hospital Group employees.

Platzeck was nominated by his party as delegate to the Federal Conventions for the purpose of electing the president of Germany in 2022.

In addition, Platzeck held a variety of paid and unpaid positions, including the following:

- LEIPA Georg Leinfelder GmbH, chairman of the supervisory board (since 2015)
- German-Russian Forum, Chairman (2014–2022)
- Foundation for the Reconstruction of the Garrison Church, member of the board of trustees
- Internationales Bildungs- und Begegnungswerk (IBB), member of the board of trustees
- Jewish Film Festival Berlin & Brandenburg (JFBB), member of the advisory board
- Friedrich Ebert Foundation (FES), member of the board
- Schloss Neuhardenberg Foundation, member of the board of trustees

== Anschluss controversy ==
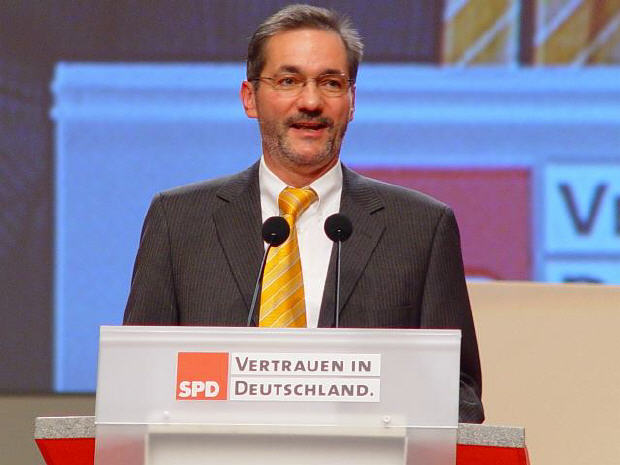
Platzeck in 2005

Platzeck caused controversy in August 2010 when he called the reunification of Germany on 3 October 1990 an Anschluss, the word used by Adolf Hitler to defend the Nazi annexation of Austria in 1938. In response, chancellor Angela Merkel rejected Platzeck's choice of words and argued that reunification was precisely what east Germans had wanted, not a process forced upon them.

== Views on Russia ==
Since the beginning of the Russo-Ukrainian war in 2014, Platzeck has made several statements that have been publicly criticised as supportive of Russia. On 18 November 2014, Platzeck called for the international recognition of the Russian annexation of Crimea. Academic Andreas Heinemann-Grüder criticised Platzeck as a Putinversteher for these comments. His 2016 comparison of the deployment of the Bundeswehr to Lithuania as part of the NATO Enhanced Forward Presence with Operation Barbarossa was also criticized by SPD newspaper Vorwärts. Platzeck expressed support for Russian annexation of Crimea and the Donbas during a September 2014 meeting with Vladimir Yakunin. He met with president of the State Duma Sergey Naryshkin as part of a Bundestag delegation to the State Duma in April 2016, during which he denied that Russia was supporting separatist forces in eastern Ukraine and claimed that if Russia was involved in the war, they would defeat Ukraine within "two, three, at most four days" (German: zwei, drei, maximal vier Tagen). Following the 2022 Russian invasion of Ukraine, Platzeck resigned from the German-Russian Forum, criticising the invasion as a violation of international law.

Hannes Adomeit criticised Platzeck's 2020 book about Russia.

He was listed in a 2022 article by Politico Europe as among 12 Germans who "got played" by Vladimir Putin, blaming him for encouraging German foreign policy towards Russia prior to the 2022 invasion. In particular, Politico accused Platzeck of sanitising Russian militarism by advocating that Russia presented no threat to Germany and supporting closer diplomatic relations with Russia.

=== Negotiations ===
Citing airline records, a July 2025 article by the Frankfurter Allgemeine Zeitung claimed that Platzeck since 2022 had traveled to Moscow at least nine times for clandestine negotiations of gas deals with Russia. Citing personal privacy, Platzeck declined to comment. President of Azerbaijan Ilham Aliyev also claimed on 21 July 2026 that Platzeck had secretly travelled to Baku alongside Ronald Pofalla, chief of staff to former chancellor Angela Merkel, where they met with Russian officials Viktor Zubkov and Valery Fadeyev between 12 and 14 July. Aliyev posited that the meeting had been an attempt to organise peace negotiations in the war; chancellor Friedrich Merz did not confirm the existence of the meeting, but noted that the German government had repeatedly made unsuccessful attempts to encourage the Russian government to engage in negotiations.

== Personal life ==
From 1978 to 1984, Platzeck was married to Ute Bankwitz with whom he has three daughters. In 2007, he married Jeanette Jesorka. The ceremony took place one year later in Temmen-Ringenwalde, with guests including Frank-Walter Steinmeier, Günther Jauch and Andreas Dresen.

== Bibliography ==
- Matthias Platzeck: Zukunft braucht Herkunft. Deutsche Fragen, ostdeutsche Antworten. Hoffmann und Campe, Hamburg 2009, ISBN 978-3-455-50114-8
- Matthias Platzeck: Wir brauchen eine neue Ostpolitik −Russland als Partner. Propyläen Verlag, 2020

Party political offices
Preceded by Franz Müntefering	Chairman of the Social Democratic Party of Germany; 2005-2006	Succeeded by Kurt Beck
