= Red–purple coalition =

German political coalition

The parties involved

SPD (red)

BSW (purple)

In German politics, a red–purple coalition (German: Rot-lila Koalition) also called a magenta coalition (German: Magenta-Koalition) is a coalition between the Social Democratic Party of Germany (SPD, party colour red) and the Sahra Wagenknecht Alliance (BSW, party colour purple). From December 2024 to January 2026, such a governing coalition has been governing at the state level for the first and only time with the fourth Woidke cabinet in the state of Brandenburg.

== State government in Brandenburg (2024-2026) ==
Before the 2024 Brandenburg state election, there had been speculation about a possible blackberry coalition (red–purple with CDU) in addition to a possible majority for a continuation of the previous black–red–green coalition. The withdrawal of the Greens, the Left and BVB/Free Voters from the Landtag of Brandenburg also resulted in this red–purple–black majority, but the CDU rejected talks for such an alliance, as the SPD and BSW alone already have a majority and the inclusion of the CDU would have led to the formation of an oversized coalition. After a meeting between the Prime Minister and SPD top candidate Dietmar Woidke and BSW party leader Sahra Wagenknecht, the SPD held exploratory talks with the BSW on the formation of such a red–purple coalition. At the end of October 2024, the two parties announced their intention to enter into coalition negotiations, which were concluded in mid-December.

An obstacle to cooperation was that the BSW wanted to negotiate arms deliveries to Ukraine and the stationing of US medium-range missiles in Germany in state politics in order to achieve a commitment against this by an SPD-BSW state government. Due to differences with the BSW, Economics Minister Jörg Steinbach (SPD) had announced during the coalition negotiations that he did not want to be part of the future state government again and announced his resignation.

Government Opposition

On 11 December 2024, Dietmar Woidke was finally re-elected Minister-President of Brandenburg and the Woidke IV Cabinet, the first nationwide red–purple coalition, was formed. On 6 January 2026, the coalition between SPD and BSW ended.
