= Third Woidke cabinet =

State government of Brandenburg from 2019 to 2024

Third Cabinet of Dietmar Woidke Woidke III
- 9th Cabinet of Brandenburg
- 20 November 2019 – 11 December 2024
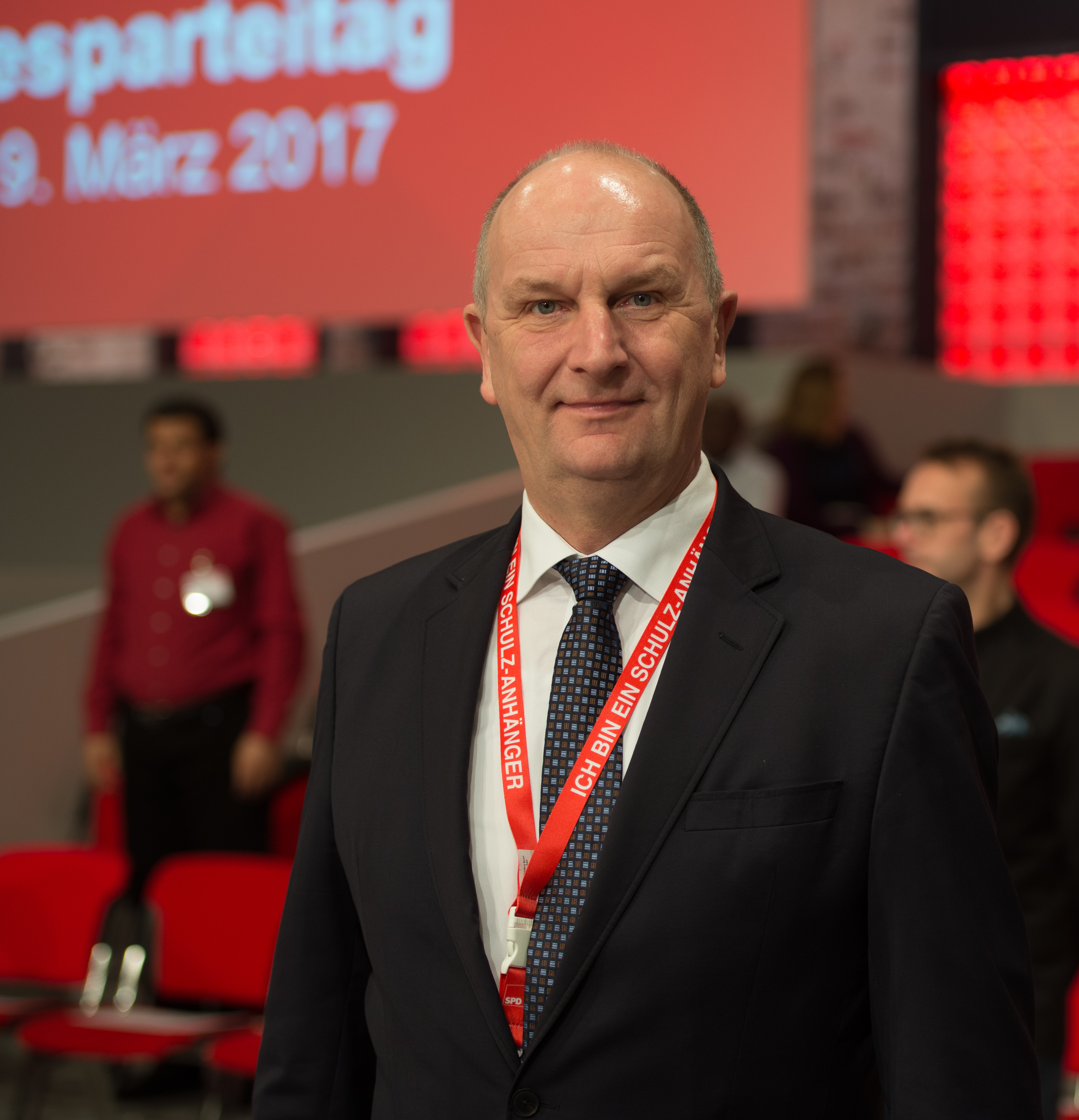
- Dietmar Woidke at the SPD federal party conference in March 2017
- Date formed: 20 November 2019
- Date dissolved: 11 December 2024

People and organisations
- Minister-President: Dietmar Woidke
- Deputy Minister-President: Michael Stübgen; Ursula Nonnemacher
- No. of ministers: 10
- Member parties: Social Democratic Party; Christian Democratic Union; Alliance 90/The Greens
- Status in legislature: Majority (Coalition)
- Opposition parties: Alternative for Germany; The Left; BVB/Free Voters

History
- Election: 2019 Brandenburg state election
- Legislature term: 7th Landtag of Brandenburg
- Predecessor: Second Woidke cabinet
- Successor: Fourth Woidke cabinet

The Third Woidke cabinet was the state government of Brandenburg from 2019 to 2024. It was sworn in on 20 November 2019 after Dietmar Woidke was elected as Minister-President of Brandenburg by the members of the Landtag of Brandenburg. It was the 9th Cabinet of Brandenburg.

It was formed after the 2019 Brandenburg state election by the Social Democratic Party (SPD), Christian Democratic Union (CDU), and Alliance 90/The Greens (GRÜNE). Excluding the Minister-President, the cabinet comprised ten ministers. Five were members of the SPD, three were members of the CDU, and two were members of the Greens.

== Formation ==
The previous cabinet was a coalition government of the SPD and The Left led by Minister-President Dietmar Woidke of the SPD.

The election took place on 1 September 2019, and resulted in significant losses for both governing parties. The opposition CDU also suffered losses, while the AfD became the second largest party and the BVB/FW narrowly passed the 5% threshold.

Overall, the incumbent coalition lost its majority. Two new coalitions were considered: a red-red-green coalition of the SPD, Left, and Greens, and a Kenya coalition of the SPD, CDU, and Greens. Of these, the former was considered more likely as it would represent a less radical departure from the outgoing government. Likewise, the Left and Greens shared a greater policy overlap with the SPD compared to the CDU. On the other hand, the Kenya coalition would have a safer majority of 50 seats compared to 45 for the red-red-green coalition, which held only a one-seat majority.

On 19 September, Minister-President Woidke announced that the SPD would seek coalition negotiations with the CDU and Greens. Discussions began on 23 September, and the three parties presented their coalition agreement on 24 October. It was subsequently approved by the SPD party congress with 113 votes in favour, no votes against and one abstention on 15 November. The CDU carried out an advisory survey of party members, who voted 85.7% in support. The agreement was subsequently approved by the party congress on 16 November. The Greens held a membership ballot to review the pact, the results of which were announced on 18 November; with a turnout of 59%, it received 90.8% approval.

Woidke was elected as Minister-President by the Landtag on 20 November, winning 47 votes out of 87 cast.

== Composition ==
Portfolio	Minister	Party	Took office	Left office	State secretaries
Minister-President	Dietmar Woidke born 22 October 1961 (age 64)	SPD	20 November 2019	Incumbent	
First Deputy Minister-President Minister for Interior and Communities	Michael Stübgen born 17 October 1959 (age 66)	CDU	20 November 2019	Incumbent	Markus Grünewald (Communities); Uwe Schüler (Interior)
Second Deputy Minister-President Minister for Social Affairs, Health, Integration and Consumer Protection	Ursula Nonnemacher born 29 June 1957 (age 68)	GRÜNE	20 November 2019	Incumbent	Anna Heyer-Stuffer; Michael Ranft
Minister for Justice	Susanne Hoffmann born 2 February 1960 (age 66)	CDU	20 November 2019	Incumbent	Christiane Leiwesmeyer
Minister for Finance and Europe	Katrin Lange born 24 December 1971 (age 54)	SPD	20 November 2019	Incumbent	Frank Stolper (Finance); Jobst-Hinrich Ubbelohde (Europe)
Minister for Infrastructure and State Planning	Guido Beermann born 4 December 1965 (age 60)	CDU	20 November 2019	Incumbent	Rainer Genilke
Minister for Economics, Labour and Energy	Jörg Steinbach born 28 May 1956 (age 69)	SPD	20 November 2019	Incumbent	Hendrik Fischer
Minister for Education, Youth and Sport	Britta Ernst born 23 February 1961 (age 65)	SPD	20 November 2019	Incumbent	Steffen Freiberg
Minister for Agriculture, Environment and Climate Protection	Axel Vogel born 3 June 1956 (age 69)	GRÜNE	20 November 2019	Incumbent	Anja Boudon
Minister for Science, Research and Culture	Manja Schüle born 4 August 1976 (age 49)	SPD	20 November 2019	Incumbent	Tobias Dünow
Head of the State Chancellery	Kathrin Schneider born 30 September 1962 (age 63)	SPD	20 November 2019	Incumbent	Benjamin Grimm; Jutta Jahns-Böhm
