= Jouleen Gruhn =

German politician (born 1984)

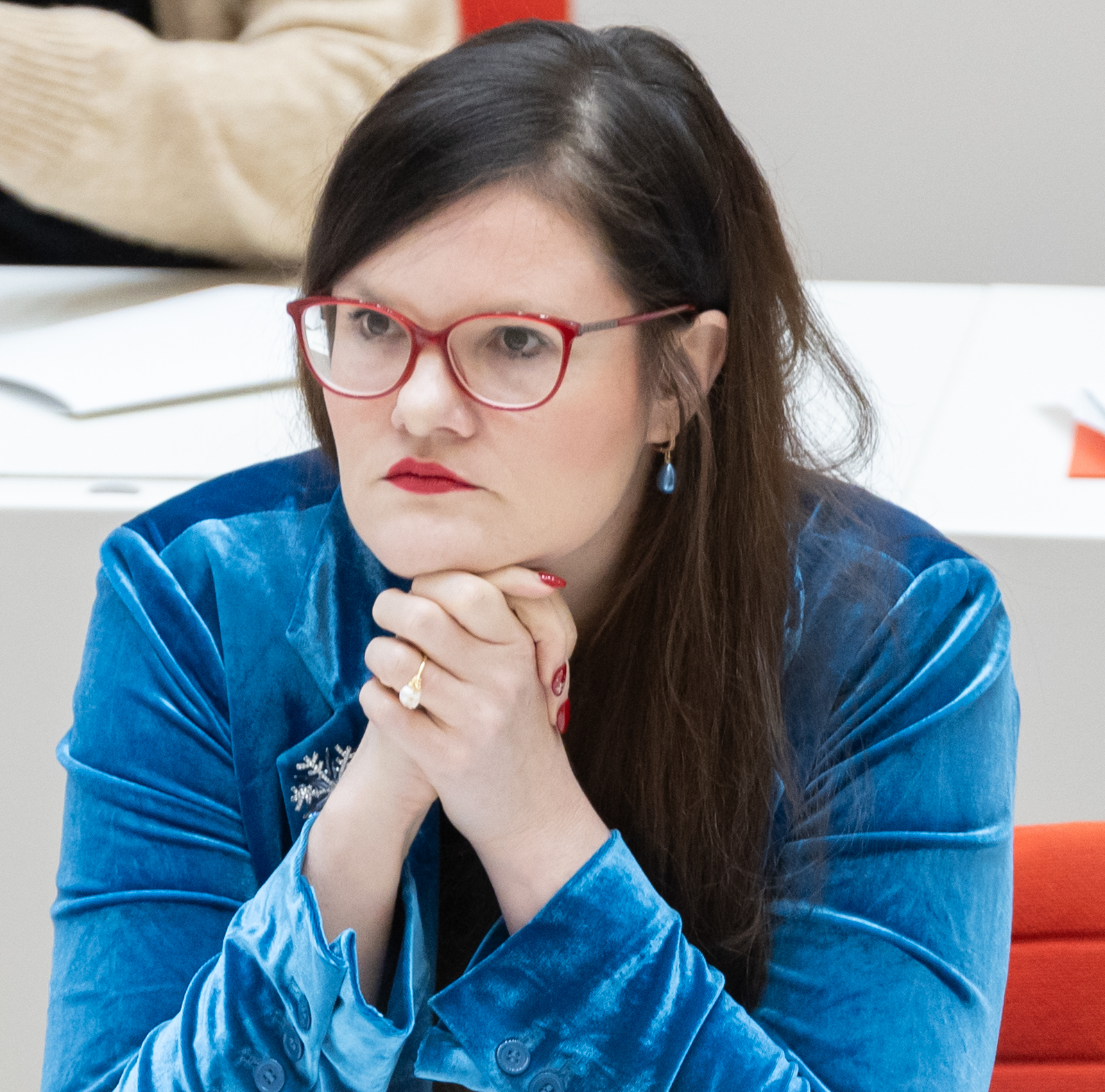
- Gruhn in 2025

Member of the Landtag of Brandenburg
- Incumbent
- Assumed office 17 October 2024

Personal details
- Born: 15 August 1984 (age 41) Brandenburg an der Havel
- Party: Social Democratic Party
- Other political affiliations: Independent (2025-2026); Sahra Wagenknecht Alliance (2024–2025)

Jouleen Gruhn (born 15 August 1984 in Brandenburg an der Havel) is a German politician serving as a member of the Landtag of Brandenburg since 2024. She has served as vice president of the Landtag since 2024.
