= Christian Görke =

German politician (born 1962)

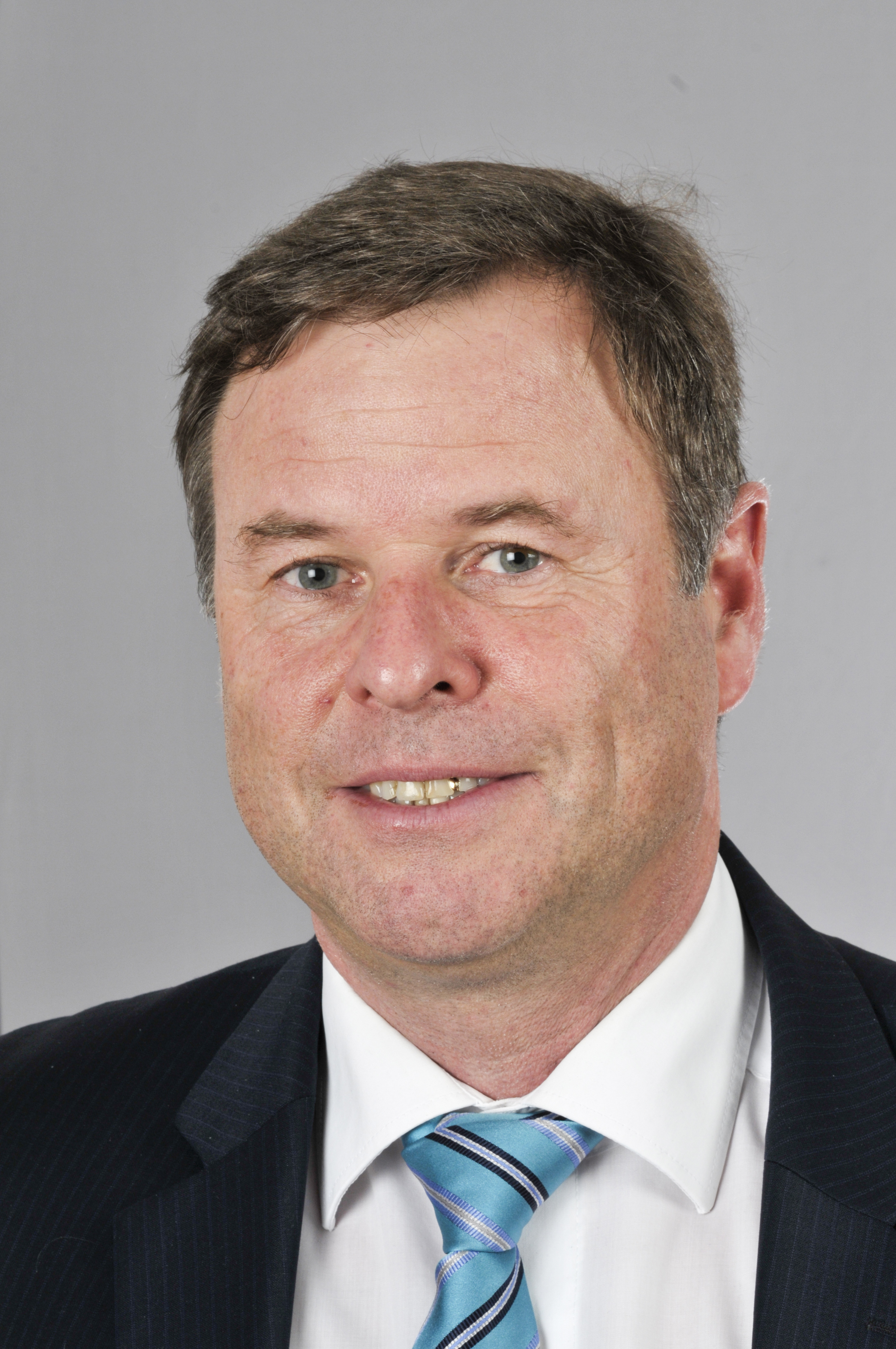
- Görke on 9 March 2016

Member of the Bundestag
- Incumbent
- Assumed office 2021

Minister of Finance of Brandenburg
- In office 2014–2019
- Preceded by: Helmuth Markov
- Succeeded by: Katrin Lange

Member of the Landtag of Brandenburg
- In office 2003–2021

Member of Rathenow City Council
- In office 1998–2014

Personal details
- Born: 17 March 1962 (age 64) Rathenow, German Democratic Republic
- Party: The Left (2007–); Party of Democratic Socialism (1989–2007); Socialist Unity Party of Germany (1985–1989)
- Education: University of Potsdam

Christian Görke (born March 17, 1962, in Rathenow) is a German politician (Die Linke). He has been a member of the German Bundestag since 2021. Prior to that, he served repeatedly as a member of the Brandenburg State Parliament beginning in 2003 and served as the parliamentary group leader there from 2012 to 2014. From January 2014 to November 2019, he served as Minister of Finance and, beginning in November 2014, also as Deputy Minister-President of the State of Brandenburg.

From 2014 to 2018, Görke also served as state chairman of Die Linke in Brandenburg.

== Life and achievements ==
Görke was born 1962 in Rathenow and became a teacher in 1988.

In 1985 he joined the Socialist Unity Party of Germany and after German reunification became member of Die Linke, serving as the party's federal chairman in Brandenburg from 2014 to 2018.

He became a Member of the Bundestag in the 2021 federal election, contesting Cottbus – Spree-Neiße but coming in fifth place.
