= Dietmar Woidke =

German politician (born 1961)

Dietmar Woidke MdL MdBR
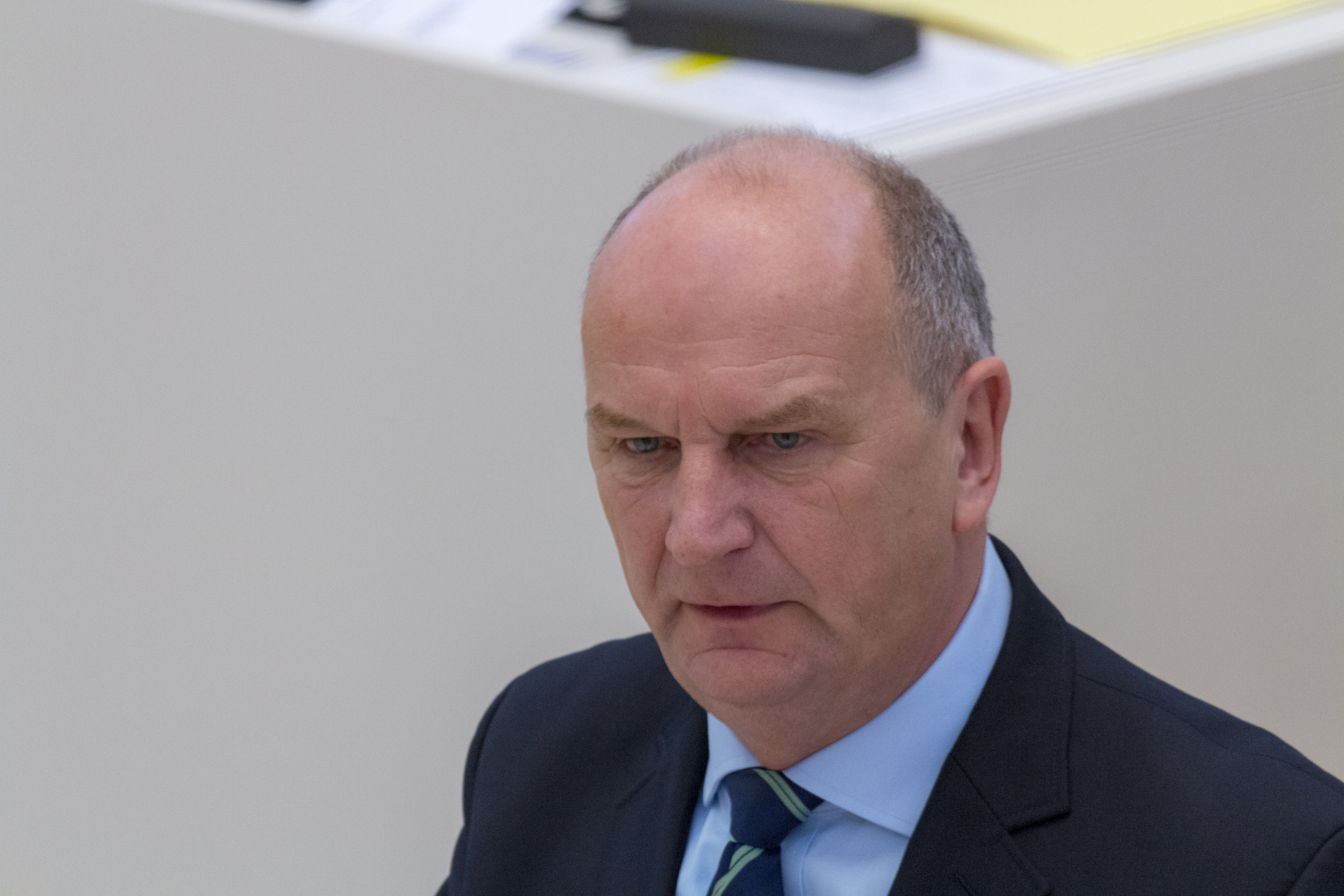
- Woidke in 2020

Minister-President of Brandenburg
- Incumbent
- Assumed office 28 August 2013
- Deputy: Helmuth Markov; Christian Görke; Michael Stübgen; Robert Crumbach
- Preceded by: Matthias Platzeck

President of the Bundesrat
- In office 1 November 2019 – 31 October 2020
- First Vice President: Daniel Günther
- Preceded by: Daniel Günther
- Succeeded by: Reiner Haseloff

Leader of the Social Democratic Party of Brandenburg
- Incumbent
- Assumed office 26 August 2013
- General Secretary: Klaus Ness; Klara Geywitz; Erik Stohn
- Deputy: Katrin Lange; Ines Hübner
- Preceded by: Matthias Platzeck

Leader of the Social Democratic Party in the Landtag of Brandenburg
- In office 11 November 2009 – 5 October 2010
- Whip: Klara Geywitz
- Preceded by: Günter Baaske
- Succeeded by: Ralf Holzschuher
Brandenburg Cabinet
Minister of the Interior
In office 6 October 2010 – 28 August 2013
Minister-President	Matthias Platzeck
Preceded by	Rainer Speer
Succeeded by	Ralf Holzschuher
Minister for Rural Development, Environment and Consumer Protection
In office 13 October 2004 – 21 October 2009
Minister-President	Matthias Platzeck
Preceded by	Wolfgang Birthler
Succeeded by	Anita Tack
Landtag constituencies
Member of the Landtag of Brandenburg
Incumbent
Assumed office 21 October 2009
Preceded by	Christian Otto (2006)
Constituency	Spree-Neiße I
In office 13 October 2004 – 21 October 2009
Preceded by	multi-member district
Succeeded by	multi-member district
Constituency	Social Democratic List
In office 11 October 1994 – 13 October 2004
Preceded by	Constituency established
Succeeded by	Birgit Wöllert
Constituency	Spree-Neiße II

Personal details
- Born: 22 October 1961 (age 64) Forst, Bezirk Cottbus, East Germany (now Germany)
- Party: Social Democratic Party of Germany (from 1993)
- Spouse: Susanne Woidke (m. 2007)
- Children: 1
- Education: Humboldt University of Berlin
- Occupation: Politician; Assistant Professor; Agricultural Engineer; Civil Servant
- Website: Official party website

Military service
- Allegiance: East Germany
- Branch/service: National People's Army
- Years of service: 1980–1982

Hubert Dietmar Woidke (born 22 October 1961) is a German politician of the Social Democratic Party of Germany. Since August 2013, Woidke has served as Minister President of Brandenburg.

== Political career ==
Woidke has been a member of the SPD since 1993. He was elected to the state parliament for the first time 1994 and since that time he is a member of the Parliament. His constituency was initially Spree-Neisse II, he won the right in 1994 and 1999. After the direct mandate he could not win in 2004 and moved just over the national list in the parliament, he entered 2009 in the constituency Spree-Neisse I, which he won directly. In the state elections in 2014 he won the constituency again directly with 49.5 percent of the vote. In parliament he was from 1994 to 1999, deputy chairman of the Committee on Food, Agriculture and Forestry from 1999 to 2004 Member of the Committee on Agriculture, Environment and Regional Planning. In addition, he led the Lignite Committee of Brandenburg. After he was not considered for the country's cabinet in 2009, he took over from November 2009 until his appointment as interior minister in October 2010, the Office of the Presidents of the SPD parliamentary group and became a member of the Presidium of the State Parliament.

From 1998 to 2003 Woidke was also a city councilor in Forst (Lausitz) and served on the council of the Spree-Neisse district from 1998 until his appointment as minister in 2004. In the local elections in 2008, he was again chosen as a city councilor in the Municipal Assembly of Forst (Lausitz) and as a deputy in the district council Spree-Neisse. He gave these mandates back in October 2010 due to his appointment as interior minister of Brandenburg.

From 13 October 2004 to 21 October 2009 Woidke was State Minister for Rural Development, Environment and Consumer Protection in the government of Minister-President Matthias Platzeck of Brandenburg. After the regional elections scheduled for 2009, he held no more government posts in order to increase the proportion of women in the Cabinet.

Following the resignation of Rainer Speer 23 September 2010, Woidke was appointed by Platzeck on 6 October 2010 as the new interior minister and sworn in before parliament. Woidke's successor as party leader was Ralf Holzschuher. As interior minister Woidke spearheaded the modernization of Brandenburg's public administration.

One of the biggest reform projects during his tenure as interior minister was the police reform in Brandenburg. It took aim at a reduction in staff numbers in the Brandenburg police from approximately 8,800 in 2010 to 7,000 by the beginning of 2020. Previously, Brandenburg had two police headquarters, a state police and state unit of input. On 16 December 2010 the Brandenburg State Parliament approved the draft law on the merger of these authorities into a new police headquarters with effect from 1 January 2011.

=== Minister-President of Brandenburg, 2013–present ===
Following the resignation of Matthias Platzeck, Woidke was elected Minister-President of Brandenburg on 28 August 2013. On 26 August 2013, he was elected to succeed Platzeck as Chairman of the Brandenburg SPD. At the SPD national convention in November 2013 in Leipzig, Woidke was elected to the party's federal executive committee.

On 3 May 2014, Woidke was elected to be his party's leading candidate for the 2014 state elections. The elections saw about 32 percent of voters backing the SPD, putting Woidke in a position to continue a coalition with the Left party, which won about 18.7 percent of the vote. The SPD also had the choice to enter a coalition with the CDU (23 percent of the vote). However, the SPD and Woidke decided for the continuation of the SPD-Left Party coalition.

On 5 November 2014 Woidke was confirmed by Parliament with 47 votes of the coalition in office. During his time in office, he notably secured a large-scale investment of Tesla, Inc. in an electric vehicle factory near Grünheide.

Following the 2024 Brandenburg state election, Woidke formed the Woidke IV Cabinet, a red-purple coalition with the Sahra Wagenknecht Alliance.

=== Role in national politics ===
As one of the state's representatives at the Bundesrat, Woidke serves on the Committee on Foreign Affairs. In 2014, he assumed the office of Coordinator of German‑Polish Intersocietal and Cross‑Border Cooperation, whose task is to foster mutual understanding and trust and to propose concrete political solutions to the German and Polish Governments.

In the negotiations to form a Grand Coalition of Chancellor Angela Merkel's Christian Democrats (CDU together with the Bavarian CSU) and the Social Democrats (SPD) following the 2013 federal elections, Woidke was part of the SPD delegation in the working group on energy policy, led by Peter Altmaier and Hannelore Kraft. In similar negotiations after the 2017 federal elections, he was part of the working group on economic policy, led by Thomas Strobl, Alexander Dobrindt and Brigitte Zypries.

Alongside Manuela Schwesig, Woidke was instrumental in the Bundesrat's 2020 selection of Ines Härtel as the Federal Constitutional Court's first judge from East Germany.

In the negotiations to form a so-called traffic light coalition of the SPD, the Green Party and the Free Democratic Party (FDP) following the 2021 federal elections, Woidke was part of his party's delegation in the working group on climate change and energy policy, co-chaired by Matthias Miersch, Oliver Krischer and Lukas Köhler.

Woidke was nominated by his party as delegate to the Federal Convention for the purpose of electing the President of Germany in 2022.

== Other activities ==
- Deutsches Museum, Member of the Board of Trustees
- Development and Peace Foundation (SEF), Deputy Chairman of the Board of Trustees
- Stiftung Genshagen, Member of the Board of Trustees

== State cabinets ==
- Platzeck II
- Platzeck III (from September 2010)
- Woidke I
- Woidke II
- Woidke III
- Woidke IV
- Woidke V

== Honours ==
- 2023 Grand Cross of the Order of Merit of the Federal Republic of Germany
