= Jan Redmann =

German jurist and politician (born 1979)

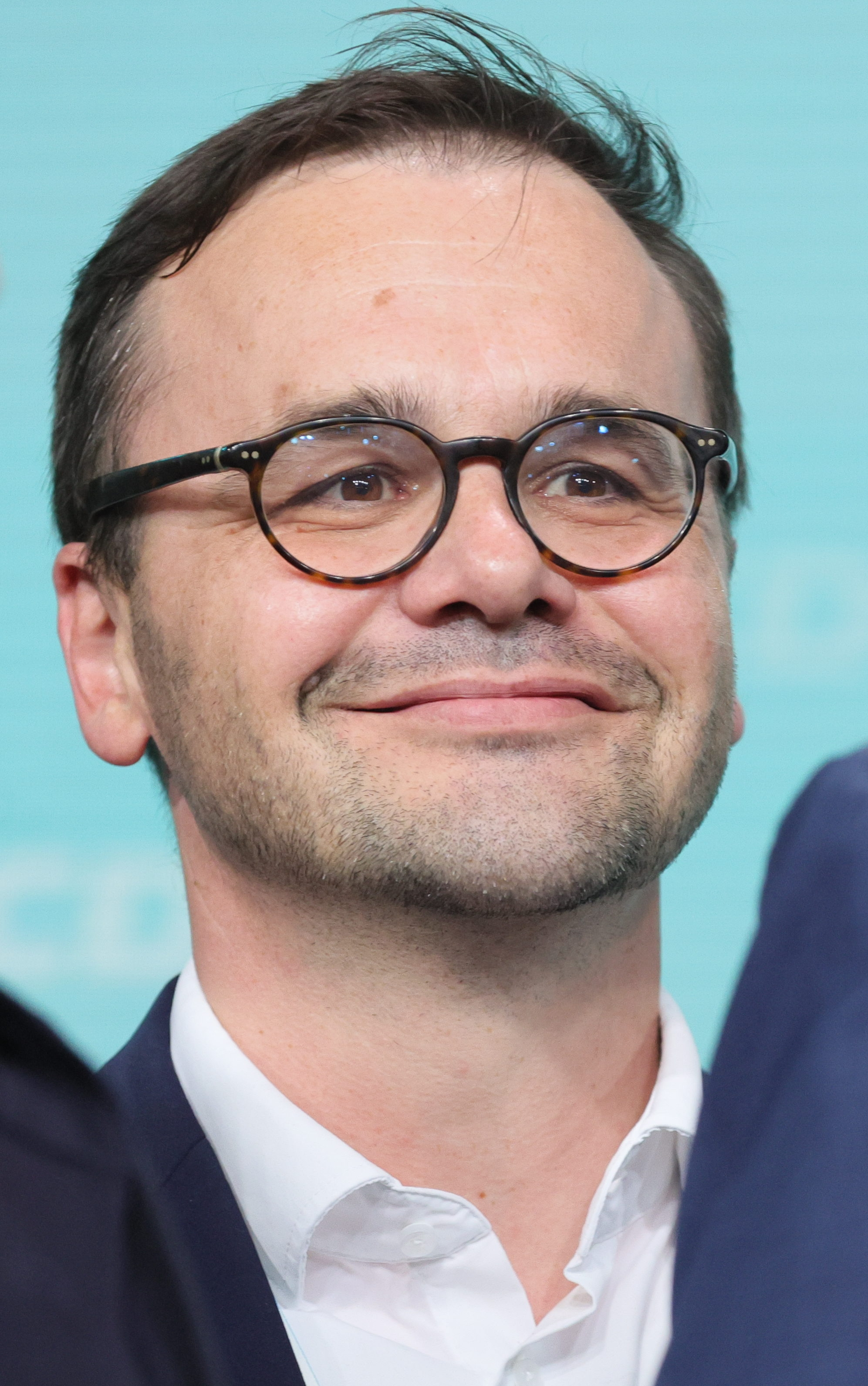
Jan Redmann, 2025

Jan Redmann (born 16 December 1979) is a German lawyer and politician of the Christian Democratic Union (CDU) who has been serving as a member of the State Parliament of Brandenburg since 2014. Since 2019, he has been chairing his party’s parliamentary group.

== Early life and career ==
Redmann was born 1979 in the East German town of Pritzwalk. He studied law at the University of Potsdam and the University of Cologne and became a lawyer.

== Political career ==
Redmann became member of the State Parliament of Brandenburg in the 2014 elections.

On 18 March 2026, Redmann became deputy minister of Woidke and interior minister of Brandenburg.

== Personal life ==
Redmann is married with a man.

In July 2024, Redmann was found to be driving under the influence.
