= Robert Crumbach =

German politician (born 1962)

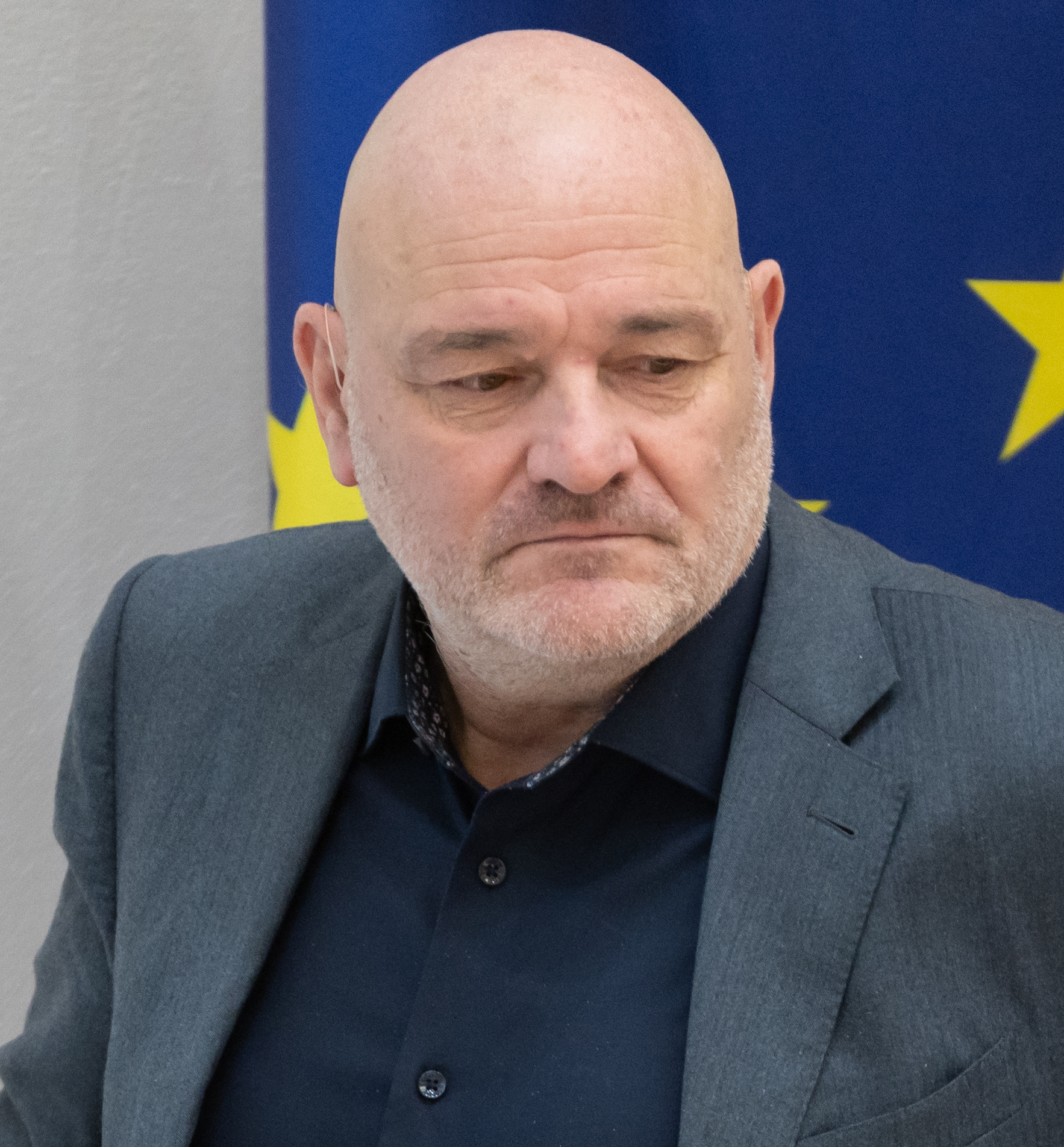
- Crumbach in 2025

Member of Landtag of Brandenburg
- Incumbent
- Assumed office 2024

Minister of Finance and Europe of Brandenburg
- Incumbent
- Assumed office 11 December 2024

Deputy Minister-President of Brandenburg
- Incumbent
- Assumed office 11 December 2024
- Preceded by: Michael Stübgen

Personal details
- Born: 3 November 1962 (age 63) Heerlen, Netherlands
- Party: SPD (1983–2024, since 2026)
- Other political affiliations: BSW (2024–26)

Robert Crumbach (born 3 November 1962) is a German politician (SPD, previously BSW). He has been Deputy Minister-President and Minister of Finance and Europe of the State of Brandenburg in the fourth Woidke cabinet since 2024. In addition, he was State Chairman of the BSW Brandenburg from 2024 to 2026 and was parliamentary group leader of the BSW parliamentary group in the Landtag of Brandenburg from September to December 2024. Since March 2026 Crumbach is minister of traffic in Brandenburg.

== Life and career ==
Robert Crumbach was born in the Dutch town of Heerlen near Aachen and grew up in Rhineland-Palatinate. He studied law from 1982 to 1988 at the Johannes Gutenberg University Mainz and the University of Trier. From 1988 to 1991 he was a legal trainee. From 1 October 1991, he worked as a labor judge, initially at the Federal Labour Court of Frankfurt (Oder), and since 1998 at the Labour Court of Potsdam. With the closure of the Labor Court, he was transferred to the Labour Court of Brandenburg an der Havel on 1 January 2023. He worked as a head of department in the Brandenburg Ministry of Labor, Social Affairs, Health, Family and Women and as an employee of the SPD parliamentary group in Potsdam.

Crumbach lives in Potsdam and was married to the social scientist and SPD politician Christine Färber (1964–2018); the couple had two children.

== Politics ==
Robert Crumbach was a member of the Social Democratic Party of Germany (SPD) for 41 years. He is active in the Ver.di union and campaigned against the closure of labour courts. In 2014, as a candidate of the SPD in the election for district administrator in the district of Stade. he lost with 30.2 percent to the Christian Democratic Union (CDU) candidate Michael Roesberg (55.62 percent).

Crumbach left the SPD in 2024 and joined the newly founded Sahra Wagenknecht alliance. He was elected state chairman of the BSW Brandenburg on 28 April 2024 in Schwedt and on May 25, 2024, he was named the top candidate for the 2024 Brandenburg state election. The BSW performed strongly in the election and Crumbach was elected to the Landtag of Brandenburg via the state list. On 25 September 2024, he was unanimously elected parliamentary group leader by the BSW parliamentary group. Due to his appointment as minister, he was succeeded as parliamentary group leader by Niels-Olaf Lüders.

On 11 December 2024, Crumbach was appointed Deputy Minister-President and Minister of Finance and Europe of Brandenburg in the fourth Woidke cabinet.

On 5 January 2026, in the wake of a coalition dispute between the SPD and BSW, Crumbach announced he was leaving the BSW at a news conference. He called the BSW unfit for the responsibilities of governing. Minister-President Dietmar Woidke had not made a decision whether to retain him as finance minister, though Crumbach stated his wish to do so. Crumbach formally requested to rejoin the SPD parliamentary group, but did not rejoin the party as a member until March.

== Political positions ==
=== Foreign policy ===
Crumbach calls for a lifting of the economic sanctions against Russia and for immediate diplomatic initiatives involving Russia to end the Russo-Ukrainian War. He rejects an end to the suspension of conscription and further rearmament .

=== Dealing with the AfD ===
Crumbach ruled out a coalition with the Alternative for Germany (AfD), but wants to deal with AfD motions "like all other motions". He rejects discussions about firewalls in parliaments believing that a party ban is "completely the wrong means" to challenge the AfD. In relation to an AfD motion for a resolution on the Solingen stabbing in the Brandenburg Landtag, he said that certain statements by AfD representatives could be relevant in a ban procedure. In the motion, the AfD had called, among other things, for a "ban on public events for asylum seekers, those granted asylum, Ukrainian war refugees and foreigners who are required to leave the country, tolerated or entitled to subsidiary protection".

=== East Germany ===
Crumbach advocates for an “Eastern quota” in science, culture and business in order to combat the underrepresentation of East Germans in leadership positions.
