= List of minister-presidents of Brandenburg =

Minister-President of Brandenburg
- Ministerpräsident des Landes Brandenburg
- Coat of arms of Brandenburg

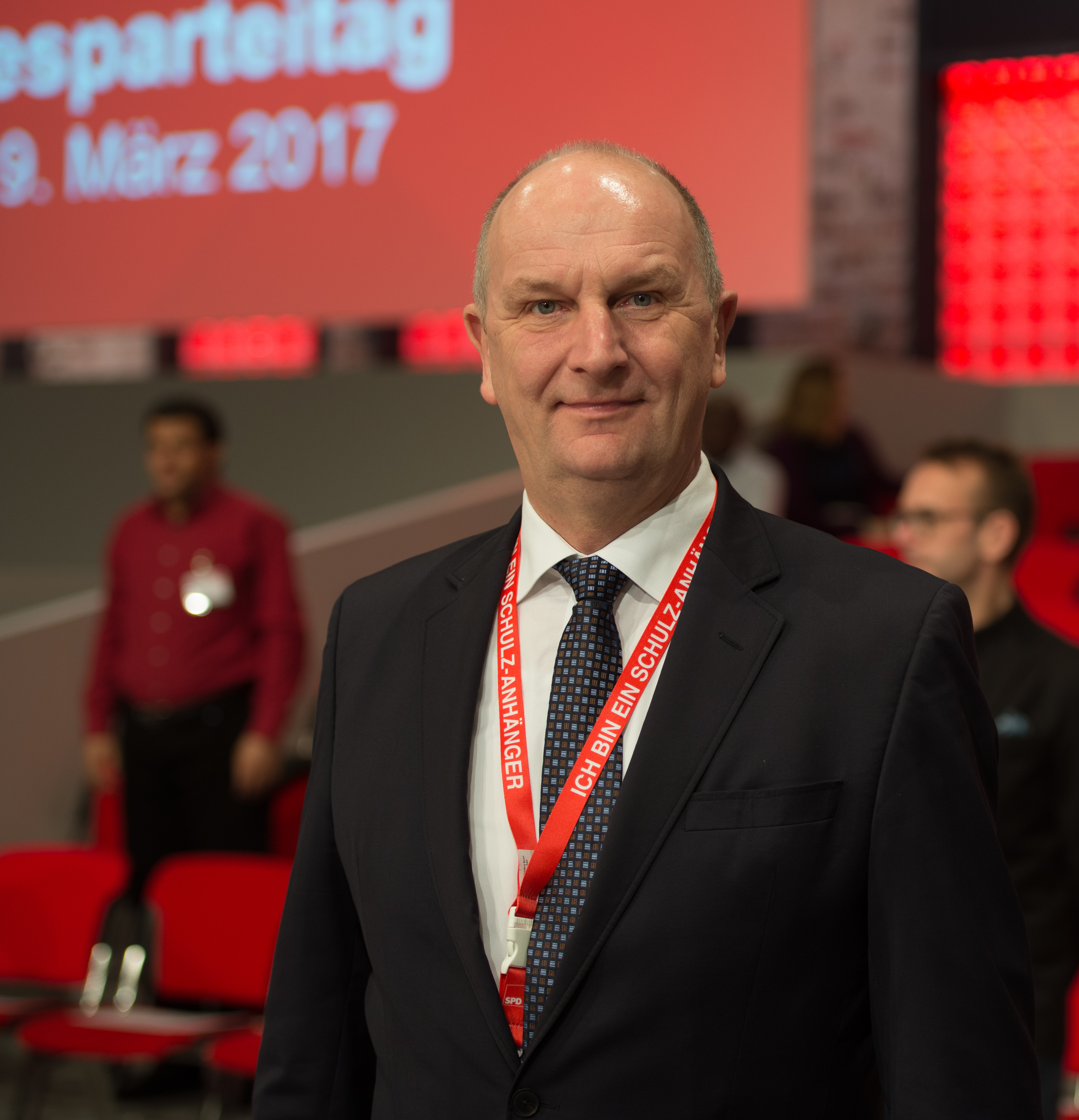
- Incumbent; Dietmar Woidke since 28 August 2013
- Residence: Potsdam
- Appointer: Landtag of Brandenburg
- Term length: Pending resignation or the election of a successor
- Inaugural holder: Manfred Stolpe
- Formation: 3 October 1990
- Salary: regulated by legislation

The minister-president of Brandenburg is the head of government of the German state of Brandenburg. The office was created in 1990 after the German reunification and the joining of Brandenburg in the Federal Republic of Germany. The current and third minister-president is Dietmar Woidke, heading a coalition government between the Social Democrats, the CDU and the Alliance '90/The Greens. Woidke succeeded Matthias Platzeck in August 2013.

The minister-president's seat of government is known as the state chancellery (German: Staatskanzlei) and is located in the state capital, Potsdam, along with the other cabinet department.

== List ==
=== Prime ministers of Brandenburg, 1945–1952 ===
After the defeat of Nazi Germany in the Second World War, Brandenburg, which had previously been merely a province of Prussia, re-emerged as a German Land.

- Karl Steinhoff (SPD/SED), 1945–1949.
- Rudolf Jahn (SED), 1949–1952.

=== Minister-presidents of Brandenburg, since 1990 ===
After being abolished in a reorganization of the territories administered by the German Democratic Republic (East Germany), the Land Brandenburg was restored in the prelude to German unification in 1990.

Political party: SPD

Portrait	Name (Born–Died)	Term of office			Political party	Cabinet
Portrait	Name (Born–Died)	Took office	Left office	Days	Political party	Cabinet
In accordance with the Unification Treaty, the designated state representative Jochen Wolf (SPD) served as head of government from 3 October to 1 November 1990.
1	Manfred Stolpe (1936–2019)	1 November 1990	26 June 2002 resigned	11 years, 237 days	SPD	I II III
2	Matthias Platzeck (born 1953)	26 June 2002	28 August 2013 resigned	11 years, 63 days	SPD	I II III
3	Dietmar Woidke (born 1961)	28 August 2013	Incumbent	13 years, 10 days	SPD	I II III IV/V

== See also ==
- Brandenburg
- Politics of Brandenburg
- Landtag of Brandenburg
