= List of Sahra Wagenknecht Alliance politicians =

A list of notable members of the German political party Bündnis Sahra Wagenknecht.

== Bundestag ==
=== Former ===
| Image | Member | Parliament | Note |
|---|---|---|---|
| | Sahra Wagenknecht | Bundestag | Former parliamentary group leader of The Left in the Bundestag |
| | Amira Mohamed Ali | Bundestag | Former parliamentary group leader of The Left in the Bundestag |
| | Alexander Ulrich | Bundestag | From Rhineland-Palatinate |
| | Christian Leye | Bundestag | From North Rhine-Westphalia |
| | Sevim Dağdelen | Bundestag | From North Rhine-Westphalia |
| | Andrej Hunko | Bundestag | From North Rhine-Westphalia |
| | Żaklin Nastić | Bundestag | From Hamburg |
| | Ali Al-Dailami | Bundestag | From Hesse |
| | Klaus Ernst | Bundestag | From Bavaria and former federal chairman of The Left |
| | Jessica Tatti | Bundestag | From Baden-Württemberg |

== European Parliament ==
Five Members of the European Parliament were elected in the 2024 European Parliament election:

| Image | Member | Note |
|---|---|---|
| | Fabio De Masi | Former member of the Bundestag for The Left |
| | Ruth Firmenich | Former The Left member |
| | Thomas Geisel | Former mayor of Düsseldorf for the SPD |
| | Michael von der Schulenburg | Former diplomat at the United Nations |
| | Jan-Peter Warnke | Former physician and professor |

== State parliaments ==
=== Brandenburg ===
Elected to the Landtag of Brandenburg in the 2024 Brandenburg state election:

| List | Name | Function |
|---|---|---|
| 1 | Robert Crumbach | Chairman of BSW Brandenburg |
| 2 | Jouleen Gruhn | |
| 3 | Stefan Roth | |
| 4 | Niels-Olaf Lüders | |
| 5 | André von Ossowski | |
| 6 | Melanie Matzies-Köhler | |
| 7 | Falk Peschel | |
| 8 | Sven Hornauf | |
| 9 | Jenny Meyer | |
| 10 | Andreas Kutsche | |
| 11 | Reinhard Simon | |
| 12 | Christian Dorst | |
| 13 | Gunnar Lehmann | |
| 14 | Oliver Skopec | |

=== Saxony ===
Elected to the Landtag of Saxony in the 2024 Saxony state election:

| List | Name | Function |
|---|---|---|
| 1 | Sabine Zimmermann | Chairwoman of BSW Saxony |
| 2 | Prof. Dr. Jörg Scheibe | |
| 3 | Doreen Voigt | |
| 4 | Ronny Kupke | |
| 5 | Lutz Richter | |
| 6 | Uta Knebel | |
| 7 | Lars Wurzler | |
| 8 | Bernd Rudolph | |
| 9 | Janina Pfau | |
| 10 | Dr. Ingolf Huhn | |
| 11 | Nico Rudolph | |
| 12 | Ines Biebrach | |
| 13 | Jens Hentschel-Thöricht | |
| 14 | Ulf Lange | |
| 15 | Ralf Böhme | |

=== Saxony-Anhalt ===
Elected to the Landtag of Saxony-Anhalt in the 2026 Saxony-Anhalt state election:

| List | Name | Function |
|---|---|---|
| 1 | Thomas Schulze | Chair of BSW Saxony-Anhalt |
| 2 | Claudia Wittig | |

=== Thuringia ===
Elected to the Landtag of Thuringia in the 2024 Thuringian state election:

| List | Name | Function |
|---|---|---|
| 1 | Katja Wolf | Chairwoman of BSW Thuringia |
| 2 | Steffen Schütz | |
| 3 | Steffen Quasebarth | |
| 4 | Sigrid Hupach | |
| 5 | Frank Augsten | |
| 6 | Dirk Hoffmeister | |
| 7 | Sven Küntzel | |
| 8 | Tilo Kummer | |
| 9 | Alexander Kästner | |
| 10 | Matthias Herzog | |
| 11 | Nina Behrendt | |
| 12 | Anke Wirsing | |
| 13 | Ralph Hutschenreuther | |
| 14 | Roberto Kobelt | |
| 15 | Stefan Wogawa | |

=== Representation through defections in other states ===
Alexander King, a member of the Berlin House of Representatives for The Left, joined BSW on 27 October 2023, the first member of a state legislature to do so. Metin Kaya, a member of the Hamburg Parliament followed suit.

| Image | Member | Parliament | Defected from |
|---|---|---|---|
| | Alexander King | Berlin | The Left |
| | Metin Kaya | Hamburg | The Left |
| | Andreas Hartenfels | Rhineland-Palatinate | Alliance 90/The Greens |

== Politicians that joined the party after leaving office ==
| Image | Member | Parliament | Tenure | Affiliation during tenure | Current function |
|---|---|---|---|---|---|
| | Astrid Schramm | Saarland | 2009–2022 | The Left | Chairwoman of BSW Saarland |

== Other politicians ==
- Friederike Benda
- Michael Lüders
- Marcel Machill
- Oliver Ruhnert
- Gernot Süßmuth
