= Alexander King (German politician) =

German politician (born 1969)

Member of the Abgeordnetenhaus of Berlin
- Incumbent
- Assumed office 15 December 2021
- Preceded by: Sebastian Scheel

Personal details
- Born: 1969 (age 56–57) Tübingen, Germany
- Party: BSW (since 2023)
- Other political affiliations: Die Linke (2007–2023); PDS (2001–2007)
- Education: University of Tübingen

Alexander King (born 1969 in Tübingen) is a German politician from Berlin. King is a member of Bündnis Sahra Wagenknecht, previously representing Die Linke and PDS. With a short interruption, he has been a member of the Abgeordnetenhaus of Berlin since 2021. He has been the state chairman of the BSW Berlin since 2024.

== Life ==
After graduating from high school in 1988, King studied geography at the University of Tübingen and graduated. He moved to Berlin in 2001. He received his doctorate in 2004 with a thesis on spatial mobility in Haiti between the paysannerie and the world market. From 2005 to 2021 he worked as a consultant for Die Linke in the Bundestag.

== Political career ==
King was a member of the PDS from 2001. From 2016 to 2021 he served as district chairman of his party in the Tempelhof-Schöneberg borough. In the 2021 Berlin state election, he ran in the Tempelhof-Schöneberg 7 constituency, but initially missed out on being elected to the Abgeordnetenhaus of Berlin. He replaced the outgoing MP Sebastian Scheel in the legislature in December 2021. In the 2023 Berlin state election, he initially missed out on being re-elected to the Abgeordnetenhaus, but replaced Sandra Brunner in the House of Representatives on 1 June 2023. In the Abgeordnetenhaus, he is a member of the Committee on Federal and European Affairs, Media and the Committee on Economic Affairs, Energy and Enterprises.

On 27 October 2023, King left the Left Party and joined Sahra Wagenknecht's new party Bündnis Sahra Wagenknecht within which he is responsible for coordinating the party's development in the state of Berlin. On 14 July 2024, he was elected co-chairman of the newly founded BSW state association.

On 28 November 2023, he resigned from the Left Party in the Abgeordnetenhaus of Berlin; he continues to be a member of the House of Representatives as an independent MP.

== Memberships ==
King is, among others, a member of the Aufstehen Collection Movement, the Friends of Nature of Germany, the NGO World Economy, Ecology & Development, the Ver.di union, the Ethiopian Disability Aid Association, the OSC Berlin and a supporting member of the Volkspark Lichtenrade Association.

== See also ==
- List of members of the 19th Abgeordnetenhaus of Berlin (2021–2023)
- List of members of the 19th Abgeordnetenhaus of Berlin (2023–2026)
