= Philipp Bertram =

German politician (born 1991)

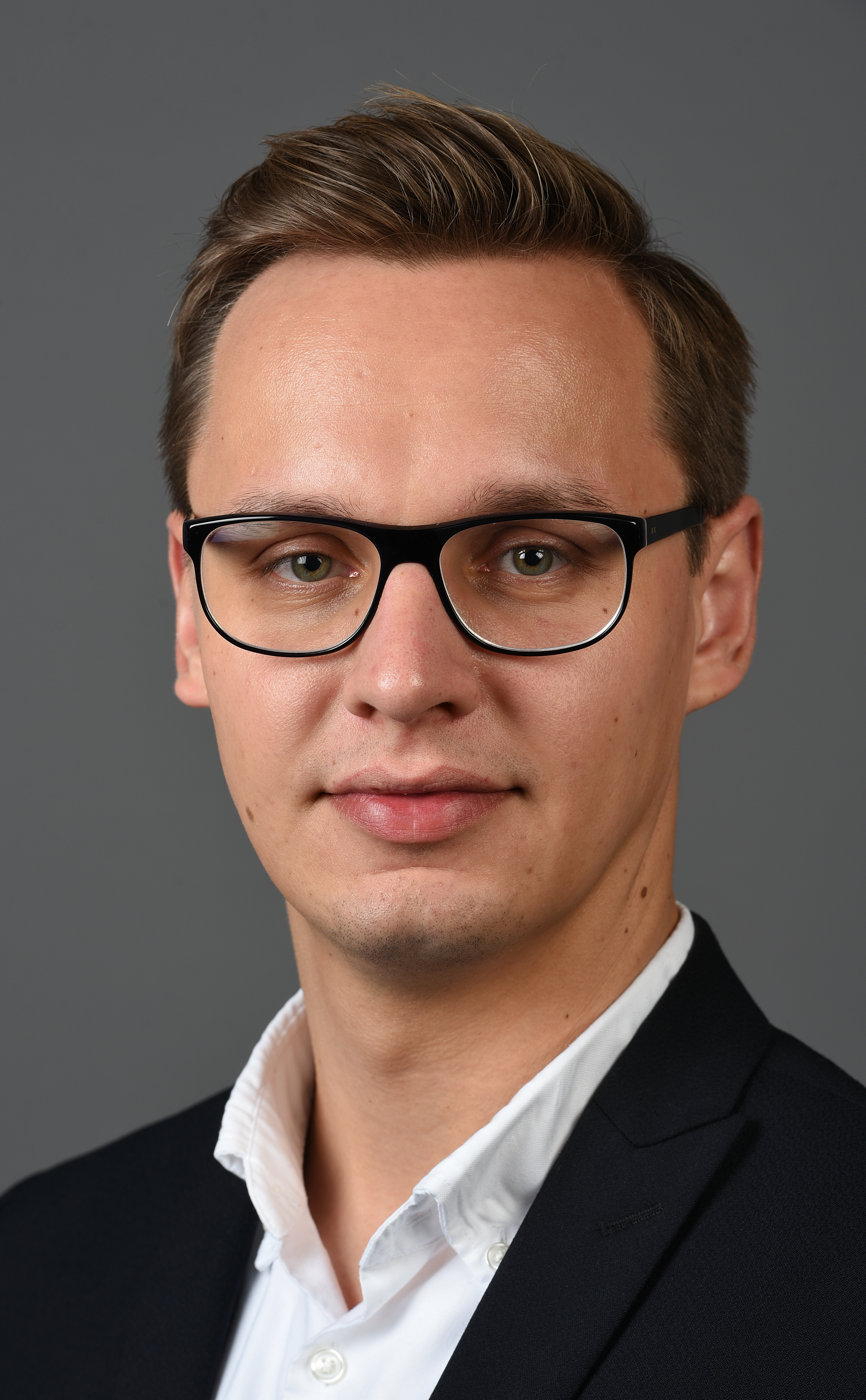

Member of the Abgeordnetenhaus of Berlin
- Incumbent
- Assumed office 1 February 2017
- Preceded by: Katrin Lompscher
- Constituency: State-wide list

Personal details
- Born: 20 April 1991 (age 35) Dresden, Germany
- Party: The Left
- Occupation: Politician

Philipp Bertram (born 20 April 1991) is a German politician, currently serving as Member of the Abgeordnetenhaus of Berlin since 1 February 2017 as a statewide member representing The Left.

== Education and career before politics ==
Bertram grew up in Dresden and studied economics at the Free University of Berlin, but left before completing his course. After leaving university Bertram was involved in the founding of the Berlin-based refugee assistance organisation, Freiwillige Helfen.

From 2015 until 2017 Bertram worked at the ASB Nothilfe gGmbH organisation, which operates refugee accommodation in Berlin. Bertram was responsible for establishing a refugee shelter at Wilmersdorf Town Hall. In recognition of his work with refugees Bertram was named "Berliner of the Year" in 2016 by Berliner Morgenpost and the 104.6 RTL radio station.

== Political career ==
Prior to entering the Abgeordnetenhaus Bertram was a member of The Left Tempelhof-Schöneberg committee. Bertram unsuccessfully contested the Tempelhof-Schöneberg 7 constituency at the 2016 Berlin state election. In February 2017 he was appointed to fill the vacancy following the resignation of Katrin Lompscher. He is The Left group spokesperson on sport

Bertram has been involved with the Queer group within The Left.
