= Fabio De Masi =

German-Italian politician (born 1980)

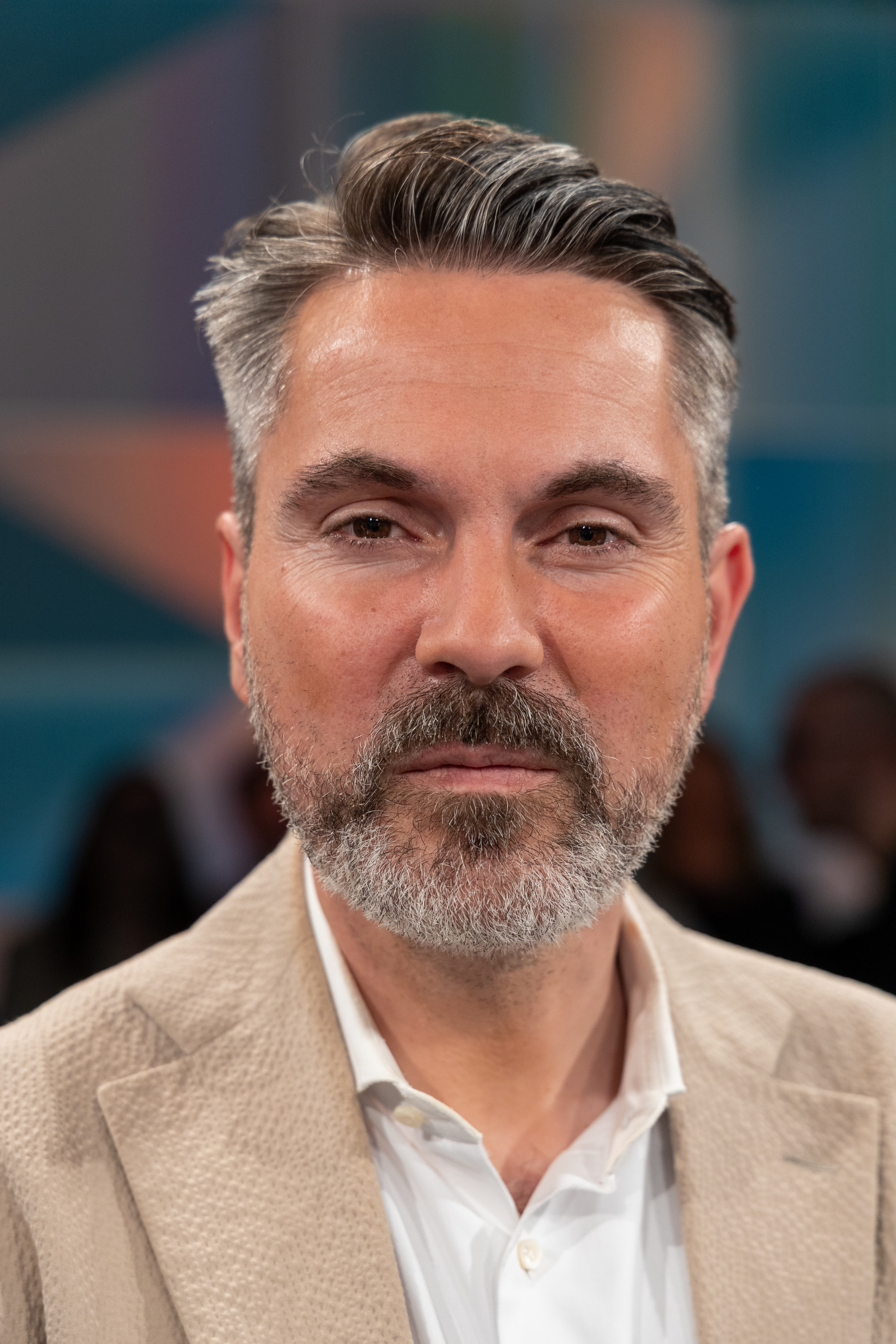
- Fabio De Masi in 2024

Co-Chair of the Sahra Wagenknecht Alliance
- Incumbent
- Assumed office 6 December 2025 Serving with Amira Mohamed Ali

Member of the European Parliament for Germany
- Incumbent
- Assumed office 16 July 2024
- In office 1 July 2014 – 23 October 2017
- Succeeded by: Martin Schirdewan

Member of the Bundestag for Hamburg
- In office 24 October 2017 – 26 October 2021
- Constituency: The Left Party List

Personal details
- Born: Fabio Valeriano Lanfranco De Masi; 7 March 1980 (age 46) Groß-Gerau, Hesse, West Germany
- Citizenship: Germany • Italy
- Party: BSW (since 2024)
- Other political affiliations: The Left (until 2022); Independent (2022–2024)
- Children: 1
- Education: University of Hamburg (BA); University of Cape Town (MA); Berlin School of Economics and Law (MA)
- Website: www.fabio-de-masi.de

Fabio Valeriano Lanfranco De Masi (born 7 March 1980) is a German politician. He was a member of the German Bundestag from 2017 to 2021 and was a member of the European Parliament (MEP) from Germany from July 2014 to October 2017. Until September 2022 he was a member of The Left Party, part of the European United Left–Nordic Green Left. He joined the Sahra Wagenknecht Alliance (BSW) in January 2024. Since July 2024, he has once again been a member of the European Parliament and since December 2025, he has been one of the federal co-chairs of the BSW.

== Early years ==
De Masi was born in Groß-Gerau to a German language teacher and an Italian-born trade unionist. His Italian grandfather fought as a Partisan in Piedmont to liberate Italy from Fascism. De Masi's father was a football amateur with SSC Napoli.

== Political career ==
=== Member of the European Parliament, 2014–2017 ===
In the 2014 European elections, De Masi became a Member of the European Parliament. During his time in office, he served on the Committee on Economic and Monetary Affairs and the Special Committee on Tax Rulings and Other Measures Similar in Nature or Effect (TAXE 2). In addition to his committee assignments, he was part of the Parliament's Delegation for relations with South Africa.

=== Member of the German Parliament, 2017–2021 ===
De Masi was a member of the German Bundestag since the 2017 elections, representing Hamburg. In parliament, he was serving on the Finance Committee. In addition to his committee assignments, he was part of the German-British Parliamentary Friendship Group, the German-Italian Parliamentary Friendship Group, and the Parliamentary Friendship Group for Relations with the Southern African States. Since 2019, he was also a member of the German delegation to the Franco-German Parliamentary Assembly. In March 2021 De Masi said that he will not run for the Bundestag in the 2021 German federal election.

Di Masi has long been a companion of the political figure Sahra Wagenknecht. He founded the "Get Up" ("Aufstehen") movement together with Wagenknecht in 2018.

On 13 September 2022, De Masi announced that he left The Left Party, stating that he would not want anymore to be taken into responsibility for the blatant failure of the relevant actors in this party.

=== Engagement in BSW ===
He joined the new populist party of his former boss Sahra Wagenknecht. De Masi appeared at the newly formed party's press conference on January 8, 2024, and indicated that he was seeking political office with the BSW at 2024 European Parliament election. Together with Thomas Geisel, he wants to become the party's top candidate.

While other members abandoned the Left Party after Wagenknecht's call to end sanctions against Russia, de Masi followed her and continues to call for "freezing" the war and states that Russia's aggression was a reaction to a NATO expansion or that a peace treaty would have been possible in 2023. He has previously also characterized the downing of MH 17 in 2014 as a "crash", rather than a shooting down.

== Other activities ==
- Berliner Steuergespräche, Member of the Adivsory Board
- Finance Watch, Member
- FC St. Pauli, Member
- German United Services Trade Union (ver.di), Member
