= John Lucas Dittrich =

German politician (born 2004)

Member of the Landtag of Saxony-Anhalt
- Incumbent
- Assumed office 6 October 2026

Personal details
- Born: 2004 (age 21–22)
- Party: Sahra Wagenknecht Alliance (since 2024)

John Lucas Dittrich (born 2004) is a German politician who was elected member of the Landtag of Saxony-Anhalt in 2026. He has served as co-chairman of the Sahra Wagenknecht Alliance in Saxony-Anhalt since 2024.

His father is an Albanian. Dittrich grew up with his German mother who was a single parent.
