= Sebastian Scheel =

German politician

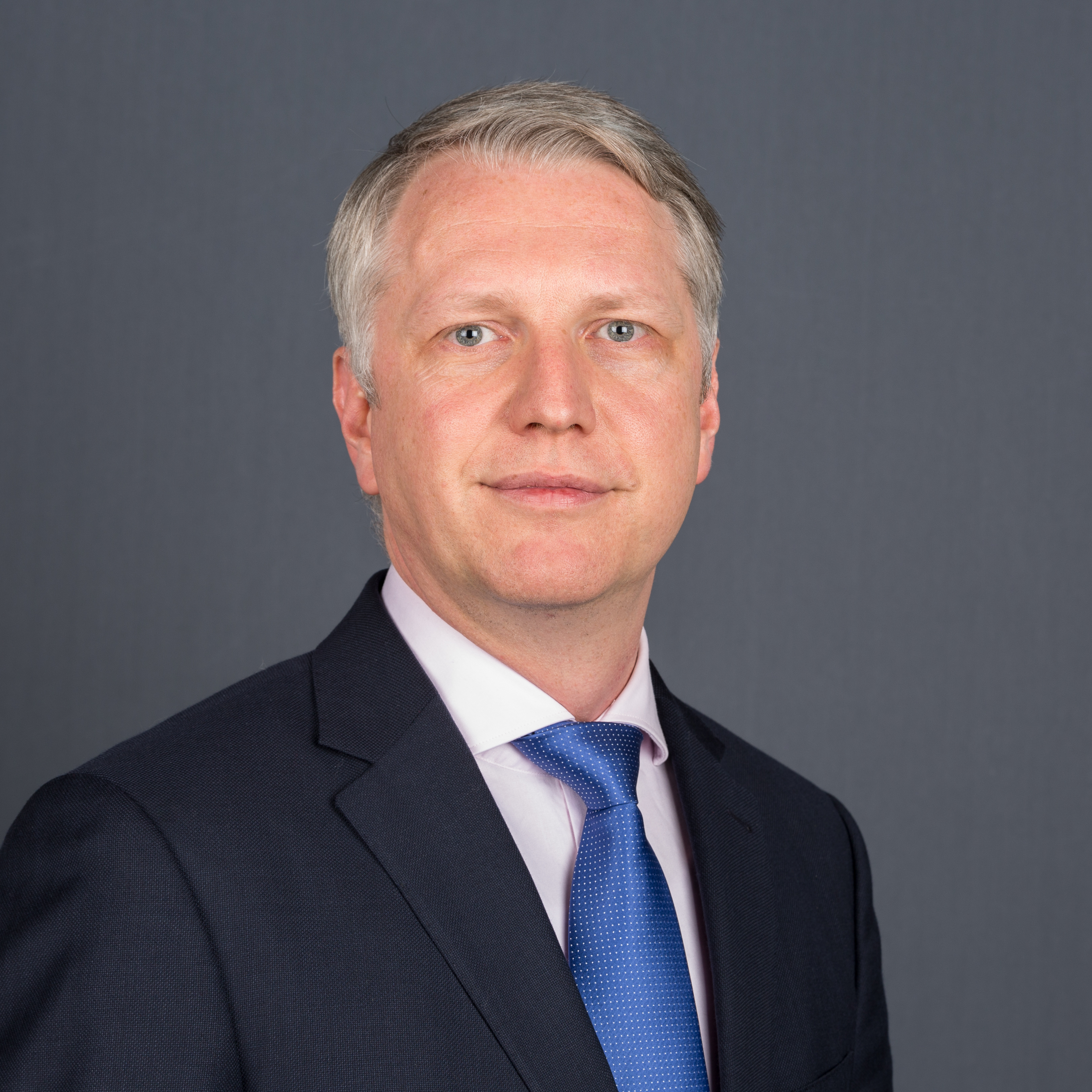
- Sebastian Scheel

Personal details
- Born: December 7, 1975 (age 50) Wriezen
- Party: SPD
- Occupation: Politician

Sebastian Scheel (December 7, 1975, in Wriezen) is a German politician from the Social Democratic Party. From 2020 to 2021, he served as the Senator for Urban Development and Housing of the state of Berlin. He was a member of Die Linke until 2024.

== Education and family ==
Sebastian Scheel spent his childhood and school years in Frankfurt (Oder). After completing his high school education, he moved to Leipzig in 1996, where he studied Political Science, Economics, and Philosophy at the University of Leipzig from 1996 to 2004. He obtained a Master of Arts (M.A.) degree in political science. Alongside his studies, from 1999 to 2004, he worked as a research assistant for state parliament member Steffen Tippach. After finishing his studies, he was elected to the State Parliament of the Free State of Saxony for the first time.

He is divorced and has four children.

== Political career ==
Sebastian Scheel became politically engaged at an early age, initially within the state student council and later in the student representation during his studies. He joined the PDS (Party of Democratic Socialism) in 1995. Alongside his studies, he served as a city council member in Leipzig from 1999 to 2004 and was part of the PDS Leipzig city board from 2001 to 2003. In 2003, he became a member of the state executive board, and from 2005 to 2011, he was the deputy chairperson of the regional association Die Linke Sachsen.

From October 2004 to February 2017, Scheel was a member of the Saxon State Parliament. He served as the deputy chairman of his party from 2004 to 2012. Within the parliament, he played a role in the Budget and Finance Committee, the Interior Committee, acted as the deputy chairperson in the 1st Investigative Committee of the 4th legislative period (Topic: Landesbank Sachsen), and served as the chairperson of the Budget and Finance Committee in the 5th legislative period. Starting from the 5th legislative period, he became the spokesperson for Budget and Finance within his party in the Saxon State Parliament. He also served as the parliamentary managing director of his party from the start of the 6th legislative period until his resignation in February 2017.

From February 14, 2017, to August 20, 2020, he held the position of State Secretary for Housing in the Senate Department for Urban Development and Housing in Berlin. He was appointed upon the proposal of the Berlin Senator for Urban Development and Housing, Katrin Lompscher (Die Linke), by the Berlin Senate. As a State Secretary, he was a member of the supervisory boards of various housing and real estate companies in Berlin.

On August 17, 2020, the state party executive of Die Linke Berlin nominated him as the successor to the resigned Katrin Lompscher, and on August 20, 2020, he was sworn in as a member of the parliament. Despite the Berlin rent cap being declared void in March 2021 due to lacking legislative competence, Scheel ruled out resignation in an interview with rbb Inforadio. During his term as a senator, he was a member of the supervisory boards of Investitionsbank Berlin and the management boards of several Berlin-based projects and companies.

In the Berlin state election of 2021, he won a mandate but surprisingly resigned on December 14, 2021, citing personal reasons. Alexander King succeeded him in the Berlin Parliament. He also stepped down from his role as senator on December 21, 2021, and was succeeded by Andreas Geisel.

He reclaimed a seat in the Berlin Parliament during the repeat election in 2023.

In terms of foreign policy, Scheel supported the Russia-friendly stance of his then-party colleague Sahra Wagenknecht. He signed the "Manifesto for Peace" by Sahra Wagenknecht and Alice Schwarzer.
