= Alliance for Social Justice and Economic Reason =

Political party in Germany

Alliance for Social Justice and Economic Reason Bündnis Soziale Gerechtigkeit und Wirtschaftliche Vernunft
- Abbreviation: BSW
- Chairperson: Amira Mohamed Ali; Fabio De Masi
- Founders: Sahra Wagenknecht; Amira Mohamed Ali; Klaus Ernst; Christian Leye; Lukas Schön; Ali Al-Dailami
- Founded: 20 July 2023 (as registered association); 8 January 2024 (as party)
- Split from: Die Linke
- Headquarters: Wallstr. 61; 10179 Berlin
- Newspaper: Klare Linie
- Youth wing: Youth Alliance in the BSW
- Membership (December 2025): ▲11,200
- Ideology: Left-conservatism; Left-wing nationalism; Left-wing populism; Cultural conservatism (Note: See also Ostalgie); Socialism; Euroscepticism
- Political position: Left-wing to far-left
- European affiliation: Unified European Left
- European Parliament group: Non-Inscrits
- Colours: Purple; Orange
- Slogan: Gefährlich ehrlich. ('Dangerously honest.')
- Bundestag: 0 / 630
- State Parliaments: 29 / 1,875
- European Parliament: 5 / 96
- Heads of State Governments: 0 / 16

Website
- bsw-vg.de
- Politics of Germany; Political parties; Elections; A: The BSW is widely considered left-wing and far-left, and is classified as a radical left party. It is also described as hard left, or left-conservative; the latter label is due to its conservative stances on sociocultural issues.

The Alliance for Social Justice and Economic Reason (German: Bündnis Soziale Gerechtigkeit und Wirtschaftliche Vernunft; BSW) is a left-wing populist and Eurosceptic political party in Germany founded on 8 January 2024 by its central figure Sahra Wagenknecht, who was formerly a member of The Left. The party is considered "left-conservative" instead of left-authoritarian or left-nationalist, as it combines economically socialist values with cultural and social conservatism.

BSW has been described as a left-wing to far-left party with populist and nationalist tendencies, and it is generally considered to be socially conservative. The BSW is skeptical of green politics, criticises support for Ukraine in the Russo-Ukrainian War and Israel in the war in Gaza, and holds Eurosceptic and anti-American views on foreign policy.

The party originated as a split from the party The Left (Die Linke). In September 2023, Sahra Wagenknecht, Amira Mohamed Ali, Christian Leye, Lukas Schön, and several other long time Left party members announced their intention to form a new party. It was subsequently joined by others including former Left party leader Klaus Ernst, Fabio De Masi, and former mayor of Düsseldorf Thomas Geisel. The Sahra Wagenknecht Alliance was officially founded in January 2024 with Wagenknecht and Mohamed Ali as its leaders. In February, they formed a group in the Bundestag.

The BSW contested its first elections in May 2024. In June 2024, the party won 6.1% of votes nationally in the European Parliament elections. In September, it won between 11% and 16% in three eastern state elections in Saxony, Thuringia, and Brandenburg. The BSW co-governed Brandenburg (SPD-led Red–purple coalition) until January 2026 when members defected. BSW was part of the governing coalition in Thuringia (a CDU-led Blackberry coalition with SPD) until early September 2026 when almost all BSW members in the Landtag of Thuringia left the BSW and formed new parties, such as Thüringen.Gerecht.

In a setback, the party narrowly missed the 5% threshold required for seats in the Bundestag 2025 German federal election with 4.981% of second votes. Even worse were the BSW results in the next three state elections, held in March 2025 and March 2026. In Hamburg, Baden-Württemberg, and Rhineland-Palatinate, the party earned under 2% and no seats. In September 2026, the party won 5 seats in Saxony Anhalt.

Wagenknecht announced in November 2025 that she would resign as leader, designating MEP Fabio De Masi as her successor. In 2026, the party faced internal conflict with breakaway groups forming including We for Brandenburg in Brandenburg and both Your Vote Counts and Thüringen.Gerecht in Thuringia. It is the only German political party to signal a willingness to work with the Alternative for Germany, against the firewall policy maintained by Germany's major parties. In connection with the 2026 Saxony-Anhalt state election, the party has expressed that they could work with the AfD on specific issues without voting for a member of the AfD to head the state's parliament.

The party was known as the Sahra Wagenknecht Alliance – Reason and Justice (German: Bündnis Sahra Wagenknecht – Vernunft und Gerechtigkeit) from its founding until 1 October 2026.

== History ==
=== Background ===
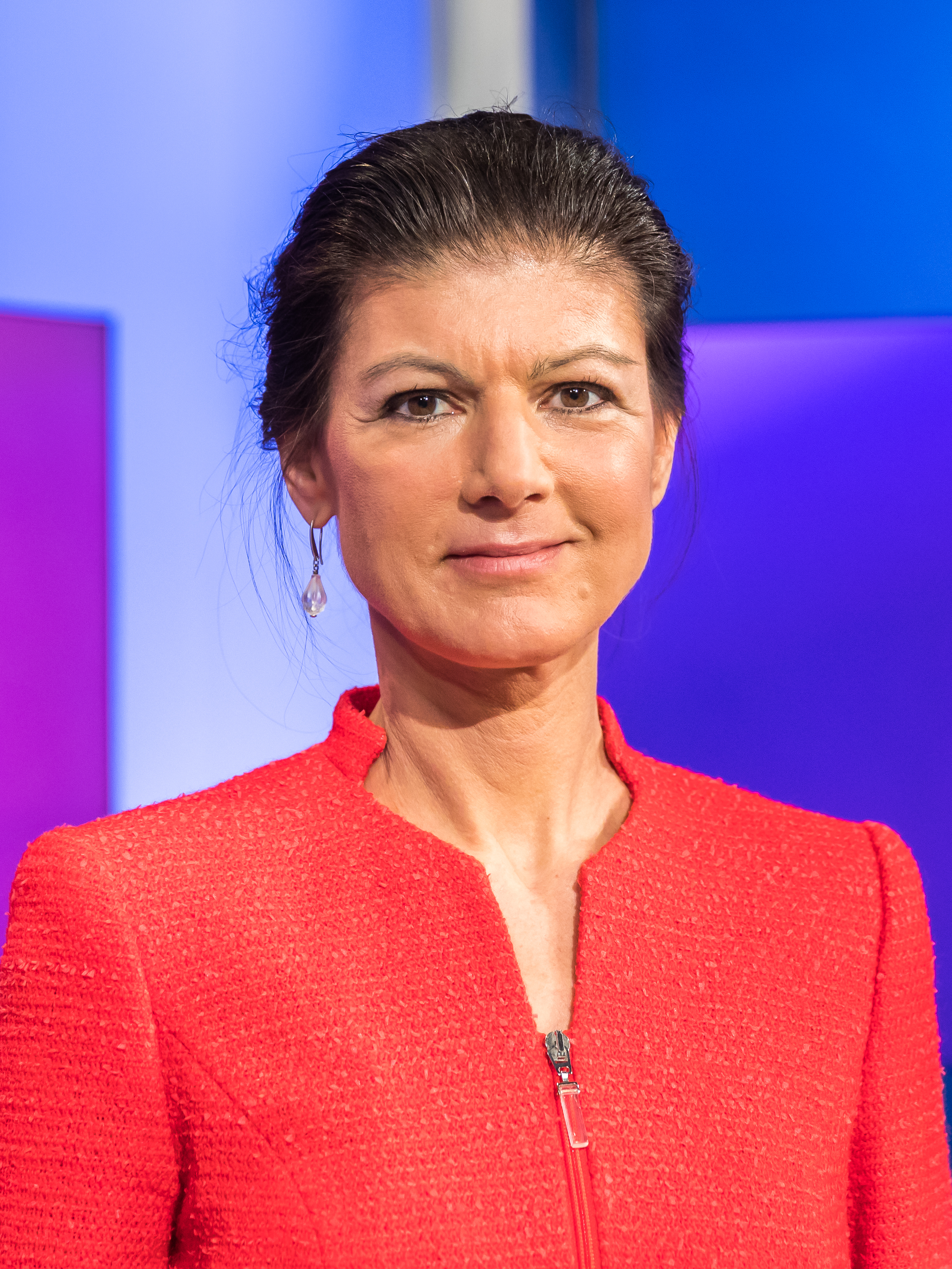
Namesake and central figure Sahra Wagenknecht in 2023

Wagenknecht, who has been described as a prominent left-wing politician, was a member of The Left and its predecessors, such as the Socialist Unity Party of Germany (SED) and the Party of Democratic Socialism (PDS); her political positions are generally identified as left-wing populist. Although she was co-leader of The Left from 2015 to 2019, conflict with other party members on topics, such as the German refugee policy, COVID-19 vaccination, and the 2022 Russian invasion of Ukraine, had led to speculation since 2021 that she would leave The Left and found a new political party.

Speculation increased in the run-up to the 2023 Hessian state election and the 2023 Bavarian state election on 8 October, in which The Left failed to reach the 5% electoral threshold while the far-right Alternative for Germany (AfD) surged in both. The success of the AfD led Wagenknecht to claim that a left-wing populist party could compete with the AfD while also respecting the German constitution.

In 2022, Sahra Wagenknecht blamed Die Linke's successive electoral failures (the party's national share of the vote having fallen from 12% in 2009 to 5% in 2021) on its emphasis on policies to combat sexist, racist or homophobic discrimination, to the detriment of economic issues. She argues for the primacy of the latter, in contrast to the intersectional approach of the party's leadership, which uses the term "classism" to refer to the social question as a form of discrimination, in the same way as sexism or racism. In her view, the working classes no longer recognise themselves in the discourse of the left, and are turning to the far-right AfD party as a receptacle for the protest vote.

=== Association registration ===
The association BSW – Für Vernunft und Gerechtigkeit e.V., based in Karlsruhe, was entered in the association register at the district court in Mannheim on 26 September 2023. In mid-October, over fifty members of The Left submitted an application for Wagenknecht's exclusion from the party in order to prevent her from building a new party with the resources of The Left.

Members of the party and political commentators blamed the ongoing speculation about the founding of a new party and the resulting breakup of the Left for its poor results in the state elections. Martin Schirdewan, federal chairman of The Left and co-chair of The Left in the European Parliament – GUE/NGL, declared that the party would expel members who committed to the founding of a rival party by BSW. The Federal Executive Board of The Left passed a resolution of incompatibility with BSW.

Shortly after the press conference was announced, a fake website was registered under www.bswpartei.de that presented itself as the official website of the party, using copyrighted imagery and Wagenknecht's office address in its imprint. Wagenknecht filed a criminal report against the website, which is now offline. It is still unclear who created it.

Members of BSW in the German Bundestag want to continue working as a parliamentary group and have submitted a corresponding application to the president of the Bundestag. When the Wagenknecht Group was constituted in the Bundestag on 11 December 2023, Wagenknecht was elected its chair, Klaus Ernst its deputy chair, and Jessica Tatti its parliamentary managing director. The association also started being represented in the Berlin House of Representatives by Alexander King, the Hamburg Parliament by Metin Kaya and, the Parliament of Rhineland-Palatinate by Andreas Hartenfels, a former member of Alliance 90/The Greens.

=== Party foundation ===
SPD
KPD
SED
PDS	WASG
Die Linke
BSW

The predecessors of the BSW. Wagenknecht was previously a member of SED, PDS and Die Linke.

The party was officially founded on 8 January 2024, followed by a two hour long press conference. This formation process saw the creation of a new website and the publishing of the first party manifesto for BSW. The party also named its lead candidates for the 2024 European Parliament election in Germany and announced that it had already created a full list of candidates due to be approved at the first party conference.

The University of Potsdam developed a political test, BSW-O-Mat (name being a reference to the Wahl-O-Mat by the bpb), based on the first party manifesto. The test was released on the same day as the manifesto.

It was announced on 1 December 2023 that the first party conference is planned to be held on 27 January 2024. Ralph Suikat also commented at the time, that the association had thus far received an amount of donations in the seven figures, this was later clarified to be 1.4 million Euros collected during the whole of 2023. The majority (90%) of which were small donations, only €12,000 in total were donated from non-EU foreign countries, thereof €75 in total from Russia.

On 27 January 2024, the party held its first party conference and invited 450 of its founding members. The party elected its executive committee and formulated a draft program for the 2024 European Parliament election in Germany, which included criticisms of the European Union in its current form and demands for more decision-making power to the member states and significant restriction of migration to Germany. The party won six seats, and saw particular strength in eastern Germany.

=== Mandates and offices ===
The ten BSW members of parliament represented in the German Bundestag were elected to parliament via the respective state lists of the Left Party. They were recognised as a parliamentary group on 2 February 2024. It bears the name Gruppe BSW im Bundestag and had already constituted itself internally on 11 December 2023. Sahra Wagenknecht was elected chairwoman, Klaus Ernst as deputy chairman and Jessica Tatti as parliamentary manager. The other MPs in the group are Amira Mohamed Ali, Ali Al-Dailami, Sevim Dağdelen, Andrej Hunko, Christian Leye, Żaklin Nastić and Alexander Ulrich.

With Alexander King (Berlin House of Representatives), Metin Kaya (Hamburg Parliament) and Andreas Hartenfels (Rhineland-Palatinate State Parliament) the party is also represented in three state parliaments through defections. With the switch of Katja Wolf to the BSW in March 2024, the party provided the mayor of the city of Eisenach in Thuringia until the end of June 2024, because she did not run again in the local elections in Thuringia in May 2024 and instead ran as the top candidate for the BSW in the Thuringian state elections in September 2024.

In the 2024 European Parliament election in Germany, six candidates of the BSW secured their seats and became members of the European Parliament: Fabio De Masi, Thomas Geisel, Michael von der Schulenburg, Ruth Firmenich, Jan-Peter Warnke and Friedrich Pürner. The party unsuccessfully sought to form a parliamentary group in the European Parliament together with the Italian Five Star Movement. In February 2025, Pürner resigned from the party, reducing the BSW's number of seats to five.

In September 2024, Slovak Smer began negotiations with two other parties in the Non-Inscrits, the BSW and the Czech Stačilo!, on establishing cooperation between left-wing conservative parties in the EU.

In September 2024, the BSW achieved a double-digit share of the vote and third place in the state elections in Saxony, Thuringia and Brandenburg. In February 2025 the party fell just below the 5% threshold to win seats in the German Bundestag, and thus lost all their representation. A few weeks later they distantly failed to reach 5% in the Hamburg state election, and lost their seat.

Since December 2024, the BSW has been involved in state governments in Brandenburg (Woidke IV Cabinet) and Thuringia (Voigt Cabinet) for the first time.

=== 2024 state elections in eastern Germany ===
In September 2024, BSW faced its first large electoral test in Landtag elections in the states of Brandenburg, Saxony and Thuringia. In Saxony and Thuringia, the BSW came in third place. In Brandenburg, the BSW competed with largely unknown candidates. Although 13 BSW candidates were elected to the state parliament on September 22, their names were missing from the state party's homepage before and after the election.

On 11 December 2024, Dietmar Woidke formed the Woidke IV Cabinet in Brandenburg and the first nationwide red–purple coalition with the BSW was formed. In Thuringia, a Blackberry coalition was formed.

=== 2025 federal election ===
BSW support in the 2025 German federal election

The 2025 federal election was initially scheduled for September, but was moved up to 23 February following the collapse of the governing traffic light coalition. The Bundestag was formally dissolved on 27 December.

During the election campaign, the public broadcaster ARD invited the most promising top candidates from the parties to a TV debate called the "Election Campaign Arena" on 15 February 2025, however BSW was excluded. Sahra Wagenknecht filed a constitutional complaint to ensure that the BSW was also invited. However, the courts decided that the BSW did not have a significance comparable to that of the other invited parties at that time.

In the summer months of 2024, the BSW polled at over 10% of the vote, and polled as high as 7.9% as late as 5 February, but the party ultimately received 4.9% of the vote, coming just short of the 5% threshold that would have entitled it to Bundestag seats. Wagenknecht's former party, The Left, recorded its best result since 2017, 8.8%, following a late surge in momentum. The BSW would only outperform The Left in Saxony-Anhalt, finishing behind The Left in all other states.

After the federal election, Wagenknecht left open what the result meant for her and her party. She did not appear publicly, with the BSW's co-chair Amira Mohamed Ali delivering the post-election press statements. Before the election, Wagenknecht had said "The election is of course also a decision about my political future. Anyone who is not in the Bundestag is no longer a relevant factor in German politics."

In BSW official statement at the federal press conference the day after the election, Sahra Wagenknecht blamed the media and the polling institute Forsa for the failure. A "negative media campaign" had contributed to the failure of her party. In addition, she claimed that the polling outfit Forsa had always reported BSW vote shares that were too low in its poll results and had engaged in "targeted manipulation". Wagenknecht's accusations were hardly taken into account; the DJV called them "absurd".

She also stated that she sees the result "as a mandate to further develop the BSW and lead it into the Bundestag by 2029 at the latest". Jürgen W. Falter attributed the party's defeat to "internal factional struggles and resignations", pointing to Wagenknecht's dispute with Katja Wolf, BSW's regional chairperson in Thuringia.

On 11 March 2025, the party appealed to the Federal Constitutional Court for a recount of the election, arguing that because of the irregularities that were found in the preliminary results, it might have crossed the 5% threshold. The appeal for nationwide recount came after isolated recounts of polling stations in North Rhine-Westphalia produced 1,295 additional votes for the BSW. Irregularities were found in other states as well – in Brandenburg, post-election corrections resulted in the BSW claiming 218 more votes; corrections also had to be made in polling stations of places such as Aachen, Lahn-Dill-Kreis, and Duisburg. On 13 March, the Federal Constitutional Court ruled that the appeals for a recount from BSW and voters' committees were inadmissible; the ruling noted that an election review is a matter for the Bundestag and not the Federal Constitutional Court, and is only available after the final elections results are announced.

On 14 March 2025, the Federal Returning Officer released the final results of the 2025 parliamentary election - BSW's vote margin increased to 4.981%. Compared to the preliminary results from February, the party gained 4,277 votes after isolated corrections. Final results benefited the BSW in particular, as 57% of revised second votes were assigned to the BSW. In contrast, the margins of major parties such as CDU and SPD only changed by a few hundred votes. Following the announcement of final results, the BSW announced that it would continue to contest the election by filing an appeal to the Bundestag electoral commission, and then again to the Federal Constitutional Court if necessary. It stated its belief that a recount is necessary and that a thorough inspection could show that it crossed the 5% threshold. According to BSW, despite no irregularites being detected at first, a recount in Marzahn-Hellersdorf still found two additional votes for the party, which would amount to 15,000 votes if extrapolated nationwide.

=== Internal disputes ===
After the poor result for BSW in the German Federal election, Wagenknecht blamed BSWs participation in the government in Thuringia, accusing state party Katja Wolf of being partly responsible for the BSW's poor performance in the federal election. Though Wolf built the largest and most successful BSW regional association in Germany, she is considered to represent a pragmatic political position, as opposed to Wagenknecht's more radical position, and under Wolf's leadership BSW is participating of the Thuringian state government with the CDU and SPD. Ultimately, Wolf would be challenged for leadership of the Thuringian BSW by Anke Wirsing, who was backed by Wagenknecht. In April 2025, Wolf would defeat Wirsing and retain control of the Thuringian branch of the party.

=== Later history ===
In September 2025, the BSW won 40 seats in the North Rhine-Westphalia local elections.

On 10 November 2025, Sahra Wagenknecht stepped down as the chair of the party and was replaced by the party's MEP Fabio De Masi. However, Wagenknecht stated that she would continue to maintain an "active leadership role" in the party.

Ever since the BSW began holding seats in state parliaments, there has been internal disput within the party regarding how constructively it should engage in state-level politics. Sahra Wagenknecht advocates for a stance of fundamental opposition, whereas figures such as Katja Wolf, who serves as Deputy Minister-President in Thuringia, are actively involved in shaping policy.

On 5 January 2026, in the wake of a coalition dispute between the SPD and BSW in Brandenburg, Deputy Minister-President Robert Crumbach announced at a news conference that he was leaving the BSW, calling it unfit for the responsibilities of governing. Minister-President Dietmar Woidke dissolved the coalition and formed a new one with the CDU. He kept Crumbach, a former SPD member, as deputy Minister-President and finance minister. Crumbach later rejoined the SPD in March. The two other BSW ministers of the fourth Woidke cabinet, health minister Britta Müller and infrastructure minister Detlef Tabbert, also left the party. Crumbach was replaced as BSW state chair by Friederike Benda. Three other MPs who left the BSW during the crisis formed their own group We for Brandenburg. The BSW parliamentary group, which had originally consisted of 14 members following the 2024 state election, gradually shrank to eight members as a result. In October 2026, parliamentary group leader Olaf Lüders announced that the BSW intended to work more closely with the ring-wing AfD in the Brandenburg state parliament.

The BSW won no seats in the 2026 Baden-Württemberg state election and the 2026 Rhineland-Palatinate state election.

In September 2026, 13 of the 15 BSW members of the Landtag of Thuringia, as well as the entire state executive committee, left the party (and have since regrouped into two parties: Your Vote Counts and Thüringen.Gerecht) in protest of increased public pressure from Wagenknecht to end its participation in the Voigt cabinet.

This also came days before the 2026 Saxony-Anhalt state election in which Wagenknecht advocated for the party, should it enter that Landtag, to support an independent Minister-President and end its participation in the firewall policy regarding the AfD. BSW ended up winning five seats in Saxony-Anhalt.

At the 2026 Berlin state election narrowly failed to win a seat in parliament on September 20, 2026. According to the official final results, the party with its lead candidates Alexander King and Michael Lüders received 4.7 percent of the second votes, thereby falling short of the five-percent threshold.

On 1 October 2026, the party formally renamed itself to "Alliance for Social Justice and Economic Reason" (German: Bündnis Soziale Gerechtigkeit und Wirtschaftliche Vernunft), dropping Wagenknecht's name while retaining the "BSW" initialism. This decision had been made in December 2025 but was postponed to avoid confusing voters during the 2026 state elections.

== Intra-party structure ==
The BSW has a unique organisation compared to other parties in Germany. Compared to its electoral performance, it has a small and intentionally limited membership base. Unlike other parties, BSW distinguishes between full members and "registered supporters". Applicants for membership must be vouched for by an existing member, and all applications must be approved by the party's federal executive board. The membership was initially capped at 450, most of them being close associates of Wagenknecht and party functionaries with the aim to build the party. In March 2024, the party had 17,000 registered supporters, 8,000 applications for membership, and 500 full members. The party aimed to have "no more than" 1,000 members by the end of the year, and only around 2,000 by the 2025 German federal election. At that time, Wagenknecht explained: "We just make sure that no one comes in who doesn't share our program or who would appear destructive and chaotic."

Journalists were barred from the founding conferences of the state associations in Lower Saxony and Bremen.

The first party executive elected in February 2024 is as follows:

Position	Member(s)
Leaders	Sahra Wagenknecht; Amira Mohamed Ali
Deputy Leaders	Shervin Haghsheno; Amid Rabieh; Friederike Benda
General-Secretary	Christian Leye
Federal Treasurer	Ralph Suikat
Federal Manager	Lukas Schön
Executive members	Fabio De Masi; John Lucas Dittrich; Thomas Geisel; Reinhard Kaiser; Hartmut Liebs; Michael Lüders; Żaklin Nastić; Stefan Roth; Alexander Relea-Linder; Steffen Schumann; Manfred Seel; Alexander Troll; Alexander Ulrich; Sabine Zimmermann

=== State branches ===
Most current state parliaments have 5 year terms and had held their last election before BSW state branches were founded or able to fulfill requirements. Unless members defected to BSW, BSW is not represented. For the state elections the BSW participated in since 2024, see Sahra Wagenknecht Alliance#State parliaments (Landtage)

State	Chairpersons	Founded	~~Members~~ outdated	State Parliament	Status
Baden-Württemberg; Landtag	Jessica Tatti; Manfred Hentz	20 October 2024	54	0 / 154	Extra-parliamentary opposition
Bavaria; Landtag	Klaus Ernst; Irmgard Freihoffer	16 November 2024	80	0 / 203	Extra-parliamentary opposition
Berlin; Abgeordnetenhaus	Alexander King; Josephine Thyrêt	14 July 2024	81	0 / 130	Extra-parliamentary opposition
Brandenburg; Landtag	Friederike Benda	25 May 2024	40	8 / 88	Opposition
Bremen; Bürgerschaft	Christopher Schulze; Alper Iseri	14 September 2024	24	0 / 87	Extra-parliamentary opposition
Hesse; Landtag	Ali Al-Dailami; Oliver Jeschonnek	12 October 2024		0 / 133	Extra-parliamentary opposition
Lower Saxony; Landtag	Thorsten Renken; Holger Onken	16 September 2024	62	0 / 146	Extra-parliamentary opposition
North Rhine-Westphalia; Landtag	Amid Rabieh; Jan Ristau	7 September 2024	113	0 / 195	Extra-parliamentary opposition
Rhineland-Palatinate; Landtag	Sina Listmann; Alexander Ulrich	22 September 2024	55	0 / 101	Extra-parliamentary opposition
Saarland; Landtag	Astrid Schramm	22 March 2024	24	0 / 51	Extra-parliamentary opposition
Saxony; Landtag	Sabine Zimmermann; Jörg Scheibe	24 February 2024	60	14 / 120	Opposition
Saxony-Anhalt; Landtag	John Lucas Dittrich; Thomas Schulze	7 September 2024	46	5 / 83	TBD
ThuringiaLandtag	TBA	15 March 2024	80	2 / 88	Opposition

== Ideology and platform ==
Political alignment of the BSW in comparison to other German, Central European, and East European parties by political scientists Sarah Wagner and L. Constantin Wurthmann. The BSW was placed in the left-conservative spectrum.

=== Academic and media descriptions ===
The BSW has been variously described as populist, socialist, economically socialist, anti-capitalist, cultural conservative, social-conservative, anti-immigration, left-wing populist, left-wing nationalist, Eurosceptic, pro-Russia and left-conservative. The latter label is used in part due to its left-wing economic positions and right-wing stances on some cultural issues, which have been described by Wurthmann as being popular among anti-establishment and right-leaning voters. Research by Wondreys, March, and Pytlas, published in the British Journal of Politics and International Relations, classified BSW as a part of the European radical left, and noted that the party originates from the "reform communist" faction within Die Linke led by Wagenknecht, which was in conflict with the democratic socialist majority faction. BSW is considered to draw "from 1970s left-wing movements and 1990s "native worker" rhetoric", and has been compared to the Spanish Podemos party.

The Federal Agency for Civic Education, the German federal government agency that promotes understanding of political issues, described the BSW as "left-conservative" in 2024, writing that the party "stands for left-wing economic and social policies that focus on greater redistribution, higher taxes for large corporations and high incomes, as well as conservative cultural policies that seek to limit immigration and critically question climate protection measures". The Federal Agency for Civic Education described the party in a very similar way in 2025, classifying it as "left-wing in terms of economic policy" while noting that "in terms of social policy, however, the BSW also takes some conservative positions".

On the left–right political spectrum, the party is widely regarded as a far-left party. It is also described as hard left. Some also consider it left-wing, while others argue that the party is conservative on some cultural issues such as immigration and gender; this combination of stances has been compared to those of Old Left parties such as the Socialist Party (SP) in the Netherlands and the Communist Party of Greece (KKE). Sarah Wagner, a lecturer in political science at Queen's University Belfast, and a former postdoctoral researcher at the University of Mannheim, who has studied Wagenknecht's political rise, commented: "We can't really say exactly how many people align themselves with left-conservative values. But what we can say is that it's a significant group. We have never seen this combination in a party in Germany before." Carsten Linnemann (CDU) described Wagenknecht as a "left, and/or right-wing extremist" and a "communist". The Guardian described the party as "combining both leftwing and rightwing policies – campaigning on everything from more generous pensions and an increase in the minimum wage to constraining climate protection measures and toughening asylum regulations".

In response to descriptions of the party as far right or socially right-wing, political scientist Thorsten Faas said that Wagenknecht was still a politician with a left-wing profile, even within the Left Party, and commented: "I would be a bit cautious about that, because it is of course a clearly left-wing project. This is certainly not a politician who represents a right-wing position." Aiko Wagner describes BSW as a "socio-economic left-wing and socio-cultural right-wing party", which he classifies as left-wing authoritarian. Political scientist Thorsten Holzhauser argues that "the party places itself in the populist tradition of the German left", but that the party's "language and programme show a high degree of syncretism". Holzhauser compares BSW to the Bulgarian Socialist Party under Korneliya Ninova and the Slovak SMER party. The Green European Journal described the BSW as a representative of "conservative socialism" which "combines socialist economics, anti-immigration views, scepticism towards minority rights (including sexual and gender minorities), and anti-elite populist rhetoric." Holzhauser adds that the party's ideology reflects a specific kind of "conservatism", which seeks to "preserve the old orthodox ideology of the East German state." Jürgen W. Falter wrote that BSW is "nationalist and socialist in one".

Political scientist Hajo Funke rejects labelling BSW as either syncretic or right-wing, arguing that the party is "pragmatic, socially and economically left-wing, and peace-policy-oriented." Funke also questions the "left-wing conservative" label, arguing that the conservative positions of the BSW such as restrictive attitude towards immigration reflect "the consensus of the established democratic parties". Similar opinion was expressed in the Zeitschrift für Parteienwissenschaften by Marco Bitschnau, who wrote:

The 'variety of political positions pulled from the right' attributed to the BSW is in reality neither particularly right-wing nor particularly varied. Of course, if you look at the situation from the point of view of the radical left, you will see in the praise of the middle class a capitulation to capitalist particularism and in the rejection of open borders an unsavoury reactionary impulse. But if you look at the bigger picture, this image gives way to that of a party that (in the words of Gerhard Schröder) does not want to do everything differently, but a lot of things better. And where it does want to do something differently, it is generally in familiar left-wing territory.

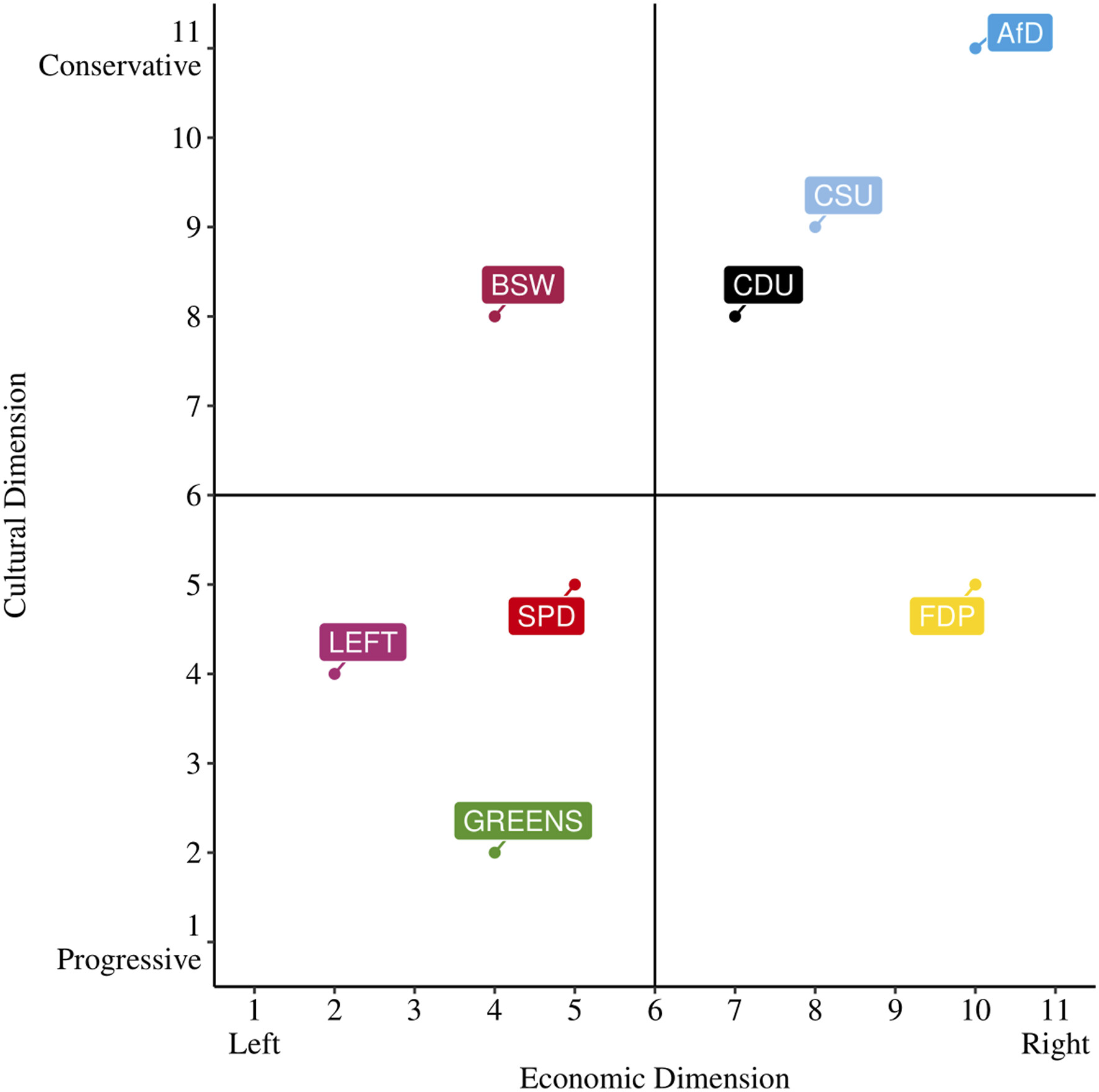
Political position of BSW according to political scientists Leon Heckmann, L. Constantin Wurthmann and Sarah Wagner

Political scientists Leon Heckmann, L. Constantin Wurthmann and Sarah Wagner classify the BSW as a left-authoritarian and left-conservative party, writing that by "combining left-wing economic policies, such as economic interventionism and increased social welfare funded by the wealthy, with more conservative stances on sociocultural matters, the BSW positions itself as a potential political force to fill the left-conservative gap in the German party system". They note that the central proposals of BSW are including minimum wage, affordable housing initiatives and stronger workers' rights and protections, combined with stricter immigration controls and opposition to green policies. Their research determined that BSW appeals to voters that place themselves on the left of the political spectrum.

Away from the right-left classification, the historian Ilko-Sascha Kowalczuk refers to the authoritarian idea of the state of the Wagenknecht party. Wagenknecht's political background as a communist determines the basic political ideas and goals of the BSW, which are anti-democratic. The BSW strives for a strong, authoritarian state that "contains, patronizes and homogenizes society", Kowalczuk wrote. This would address people in eastern Germany whose political ideas were embossed in the GDR and characterized by the endorsement of a "strong state".

=== Policies and political positions ===
The political positions of the BSW include further restrictions on immigration, a plan for deglobalisation, opposition to green politics, ending military aid to Ukraine, and a negotiated settlement to the Russian invasion of Ukraine. Wagenknecht considers the BSW to stand primarily in opposition to Alliance 90/The Greens. In an interview with the Süddeutsche Zeitung, Wagenknecht stated that her party is "obviously not right-wing", instead being left-wing in the sense of "striving for more social justice, good wages, decent pensions" and "a foreign policy that returns to the tradition of détente instead of relying more and more on the military card". However, Wagenknecht omitted the label left-wing (links) within the name of the new party, saying that "many people today associate [it] with completely different content" and with "elitist debates", and that the BSW would appeal to a "broad spectrum of potential voters". Wagenknecht felt that The Left had become socially liberal and what she called "left-lifestyle" rather than left-wing, and accused progressives in The Left of being "too focused on diet, pronouns, and the perception of racism" as opposed to "poverty and an ever-growing gap between rich and poor."

The party's economic program focuses on economic justice, reducing social inequality, and wealth redistribution; its demands include redistributing the wealth to German workers, rolling back neoliberal policies and protecting domestic industries from global market pressures. It is sceptical of capitalism as a socioeconomic system. Wagenknecht published a five-page manifesto that also focused on deteriorating bridges and roads, bad mobile phone reception and internet, and overwhelmed administrations. The BSW claims to represent the interests of "low earners" and supports "public welfare-oriented politics", where welfare would stand above "egoistic interests". BSW is strongly critical of growing social injustice, the power and influence of multinational corporations, and the German taxation system, which it decries as unfair. It calls for state intervention against market-dominating companies and infringing "digital monopolists", listing Amazon, Facebook, Microsoft and Apple as examples; it argues that large corporations undermine democracy and must be broken down. The BSW rejects market economy, denouncing it as a system that causes concentration of wealth in the hands of the few and leads to a situation where companies reach record dividends "while the queues in front of food banks become longer and longer". The party states that until now, "redistribution worked from the hard-working to the upper 10,000". As a solution, it proposes additional taxation of the wealthy, dissolution and decentralisation of large companies, and anti-lobbyism laws. The BSW also calls for nationalization of key industries and more collective bargaining coverage for the workers.

The party's economic proposals include the demand to break away from the capitalist system, redistribution of wealth and economic interventionism. The main economic theme of the party is social justice – it presents itself as a defender of the poor and proposes social measures to protect the disadvantaged groups. It calls for an economically oriented towards "the common good", advocates a fair wage policy and extensive social security system. For BSW, the main reason behind current wealth inequality were neoliberal reforms and globalisation, which oriented the economy towards low-paid basic service jobs that came to represent the majority of the workers. This also marked the emergence of "knowledge societies" composed of elite universities' graduates, which do not experience economic hardship. According to BSW, markets and competition are no longer functioning, as "financial groups" consolidated power and have imposed their laws on society and "destroyed democracy". The party advocates a new economic system where the market would be severely limited, and where the groups that hitherto dominated it would be broken.

==== Cultural issues ====
The party is considered to have some culturally conservative stances, such as its opposition to immigration, scepticism of gender-inclusive language and transgender rights. The party presents its anti-immigration stance as a way to protect the German welfare state, arguing that it needs social solidarity to function that mass immigration could disturb. Wagenknecht argued: "The stronger the welfare state, the more of a sense of belonging there must be. Because if people have no connection to those who receive social benefits, then at some point they will refuse to pay for those benefits."

Wagenknecht considers supporting immigration a "market liberal" stance rather than a left-wing one, arguing: "[t]he CDU of Angela Merkel stands for flexibility, economic liberalism, globalisation and high levels of migration, i.e. a policy that weakens cohesion and valuable mutual connections that previously offered people security and support". The party believes that immigration is exploitative as it represents a net loss for countries of origin, seeing it as a "convenient way for rich countries to cream off human resources". At the same time, the BSW argues that immigration lowers the quality of life in Germany due to not only welfare expenses, but also a lack of places in schools and housing. To Wagenknecht, the welfare state is based on citizens' loyalty and their willingness to pay taxes, and "if there is no longer any difference between citizens and non-citizens of a country, there is of course no longer any duty of a state to protect its population in a special manner". She argues that the result is a removal of welfare and social support.

The party is highly critical of gender-inclusive modifications of the German language. Wagenknecht argued that while everyone "should live their own way", Germany has an issue where "people with a traditional family no longer feel valued and someone who is white, male and heterosexual almost has to apologise for it". She advocated a "gender ban" in schools and public institutions on example of the one enacted in Bavaria by Markus Söder, which enforces the usage of traditional German grammar in regards to gender. The party is also against loosening regulations on legally changing one's gender; Wagenknecht believes that such a law "turns parents and children into guinea pigs for an ideology that only benefits the pharmaceutical lobby."

Wagenknecht seeks to distance herself and her party from what she considers "lifestyle leftists" that focus on identity politics and "an attitude of moral superiority", at the cost of neglecting blue-collar workers and the poor. She argues that mainstream left-wing parties abandoned "globalisation losers", which she defines as workers disadvantaged by migration pressures and overseas market competition. Wagenknecht identifies this "lifestyle leftism" as the main reason behind the rise of right-wing populism in Europe:

Left liberal arrogance nurtures rightist gains of [political] territory. As noisier the rightist attacks, as more left liberals feel justified in their position. Nazis oppose migration? Thus, every critic of migration must be a crypto Nazi... [i]nstead of addressing ... majorities with a programme attractive to them, [the] SPD and Left party have helped the AfD to electoral triumphs, turning it into the leading "workers' party". In an altogether submissive manner, they also accepted the Greens as intellectual and political avant-garde. This removed them [leftists] from any chance to win a majority on their own.

The BSW accuses other left-wing parties of elitism and the "new education privilege", stating that they have become dominated by urban academia and no longer represent the lower socioeconomic classes of society. The party stresses solidarity, contrasting the "somewheres" - workers that feel attachment to particular states and regions - with "anywheres", the "globalised elites". The party puts an emphasis on traditional family values and regional identities, criticising social progressivism as an extension of market-liberal policies that "weaken cohesion and valuable mutual connections that previously offered people security and support".

==== China ====
The party is described as pro-China. The BSW also strongly supports the economic and industrial policies of the Chinese Communist Party, describing them as "an exemplary model for how to manage a national economy". The BSW strongly criticises the involvement of German troops in the South China Sea, opposing proposals to deploy ships there and calling for negotiations instead.

==== European Union and globalisation ====
The party is highly sceptical of globalisation and European integration, criticising the European Union as vulnerable to lobbying, undemocratic in its decision-making system, and economically unfair to the lower classes. The BSW advocates greater national sovereignty and denounces European federalism, with Wagenknecht stating: "The call for 'an end to the nation-state' is ultimately a call for 'an end to democracy and the welfare state'." The party opposes the EU "not only because the EU is fundamentally anti-democratic and prone to oligarchic capture, but because it cannot be otherwise, given that today the nation-state remains the main source of people's collective identity and sense of belonging, and therefore the only territorial institution (or at least the largest) through which it is possible to organise democracy and achieve social balance."

==== Israel–Palestine conflict ====
Amidst the Gaza war, Wagenknecht described the Gaza Strip as an "open-air prison". In an August 2024 interview she stated "I will always defend Israel's right to exist. [Israel does have the right to defend itself against] Hamas and its terrible attack in October. But the campaign of destruction in the Gaza Strip has long ceased to be self-defence." She also stated that a ceasefire is needed.

==== Political system ====
In December 2024, the Bundestag decided to better protect the Federal Constitutional Court against political attacks. For this purpose, the structure (16 judges and two senates) was incorporated into the basic law. All of the parties in the Bundestag (CDU/CSU, FDP, A90/Greens, SPD, and The Left) voted for it, except for the far-right AfD and the BSW. The BSW argued that the "ruling parties" were afraid that they would be punished in the 2025 federal election and described the inclusion of the court in the basic law, which can only be changed with a 2/3 majority, as "undemocratic".

==== Renewable and nuclear energy ====
BSW also focuses on energy policy, arguing that renewable energies alone will not suffice to cover the energy needs; the party proposes to invest in nuclear power plants in addition. The party argues that while it is concerned about the environment, the German economy is industry-heavy and its energy supply cannot be secured through renewable energies and the usage of traditional fuels should be tolerated to some extent.

Wagenknecht criticised the Scholz cabinet for depriving the German economy of the cheap Russian gas and providing no alternative sources of affordable energy; similarly, BSW is critical of the EU's heating law and plans to ban combustion engine cars – Wagenknecht described these policies as "an attack on citizens' wealth and property; it is poorly thought out, poorly crafted and useless in terms of climate policy". The party rejects environmental and green energy efforts which it considers to be "blind, haphazard eco-activism, which makes people's lives even more expensive but actually does nothing at all for the climate".

==== Russia and Ukraine ====
BSW's foreign policy has been labelled and criticised as being pro-Russian or Russia-friendly, which is denied by Wagenknecht. On the death of Russian opposition politician Alexei Navalny in February 2024, Wagenknecht commented: "The early death of Alexei Navalny is shocking. Even if it is still unclear exactly what Putin's critic died of. One thing is certain: Navalny was a victim of the autocratic system in today's Russia." At the same time, the BSW advocates political détente with Russia, arguing that "Germany's subordination to the US-Nato proxy war strategy in Ukraine, and refusal to engage in diplomatic talks with Russia, is self-defeating from an economic as well as a geopolitical standpoint". It is particularly critical of oil and gas embargoes against Russia, accusing ruling parties of "negligently playing with the security and in the worst case the lives of millions of people in Germany".

The BSW argues that in delivering weapons to Ukraine, the German government failed its collective responsibility to act diplomatically, and accused the Ukrainian government of Nazism. Wagenknecht stated:

[...] that in the country that is supposedly defending our freedom and our values so bravely today, that in this country, Nazi collaborators like Stepan Bandera of the militia were involved in the Holocaust and are responsible for the deaths of thousands of Jews, Russians, and Poles, that in this country such a man is defended and revered as a national hero, after whom streets and squares are named. I find it strange that this real openness to the law does not bother our Green moralists at all. This also shows their double standards and hypocrisy.

BSW is also described as anti-NATO. The BSW is critical of sending weapons to Ukraine and its supporters in the Russo-Ukrainian War, and blames NATO for escalating the conflict. Wagenknecht argued that the war was provoked by "NATO expansionism" and the "unwillingness of Western countries to respond to negotiation readiness by Putin"; BSW rejects sanctions against Russia as driving an economic crisis for the workers. The party attacks NATO as a "militaristic, imperialist alliance par excellence". BSW stated that its opposition to NATO and arming Ukraine stems from its goal to free Germany "from the geostrategic grip of the United States". In December 2024, Wagenknecht declared that she "condemns this war." She "considers politicians who start wars—and that also applies to Vladimir Putin—to be criminals."

In the spring of 2024, in two interviews, Wagenknecht linked the peace negotiations she had called for between Ukraine and Russia with the proposal that the population in Russian-occupied Ukrainian territories should vote on their nationality in a referendum supervised by the United Nations. She also outlined what a peace agreement could look like, and did not rule out security guarantees or a military obligation to provide Ukraine with military assistance if Russia were to break a peace agreement. She could imagine China, Turkey or France as guarantor powers. She also called for Gerhard Schröder's "line to the Russian president" to be used for negotiations. In June 2024 she defended the absence of the BSW MPs from a speech by Ukrainian president Volodymyr Zelenskyy in the German Federal Parliament, she described the war in Ukraine as a "proxy war" between NATO and Russia.

On 14 October 2026, in the newly elected state parliament of Saxony-Anhalt, the AfD and BSW succeeded in pushing through a joint motion, titled "Peace Talks Instead of Escalation of the War in Ukraine" by leveraging their combined parliamentary majority. The decision has no impact on German foreign policy, but the joint action taken by the BSW and the right-wing nationalists AfD is seen as a political signal.

== Election results ==
=== Federal Parliament (Bundestag) ===
Election	Constituency		Party list		Seats	+/–	Status
Election	Votes	%	Votes	%	Seats	+/–	Status
2025	299,401	0.6 (#10)	2,472,947	4.98 (#7)	0 / 630	New	No seats

BSW support in the 2024 European Parliament election in Germany

=== European Parliament ===
The 9 June 2024 European Parliament election in Germany, held in connection with many local elections, was the first major election the BSW participated in. The usual 5% election threshold does not apply, around 1% is enough to win one of 96 seats assigned to Germany, thus more than a dozen German parties are presented in the EP, many more than within German parliaments.

Election	List leader	Votes	%	Seats	+/–	EP Group
2024	Fabio De Masi	2,453,652	6.2 (#6)	6 / 96	New	NI

=== State parliaments (Landtage) ===
State parliament	Election	Votes	%	Seats	+/–	Status
Saxony	2024	277,173	11.8 (#3)	15 / 120	New	Opposition
Thuringia	2024	190,448	15.8 (#3)	15 / 88	New	CDU–BSW–SPD (2024–2026)
Thuringia	2024	190,448	15.8 (#3)	15 / 88	New	Opposition (2026–present)
Brandenburg	2024	202,343	13.5 (#3)	14 / 88	New	SPD–BSW (2024–2026)
Brandenburg	2024	202,343	13.5 (#3)	14 / 88	New	Opposition (2026–present)
Hamburg	2025	76,922	1.8 (#8)	0 / 121	New	No seats
Baden-Württemberg	2026	76,314	1.4 (#8)	0 / 157	New	No seats
Rhineland-Palatinate	2026	37,770	1.9 (#8)	0 / 105	New	No seats
Saxony-Anhalt	2026	69,291	5.3 (#6)	5 / 83	New	TBD
Berlin	2026	86,041	4.7 (#6)	0 / 158	New	No seats
Mecklenburg-Vorpommern	2026	49,036	4.8 (#6)	0 / 71	New	No seats

See Next elections in Germany for more upcoming elections.

=== Results timeline ===
Year	(Germany) DE	(European Union) EU	(Baden-Württemberg) BW	(Bavaria) BY	(Berlin) BE	(Brandenburg) BB	(Bremen (state)) HB	(Hamburg) HH	(Hesse) HE	(Lower Saxony) NI	(Mecklenburg-Vorpommern) MV	(North Rhine-Westphalia) NW	(Rhineland-Palatinate) RP	(Saarland) SL	(Saxony) SN	(Saxony-Anhalt) ST	(Schleswig-Holstein) SH	(Thuringia) TH
2023	For continuation before 2024, see Die Linke's timeline																	
2024	N/A	▲**6.2**	N/A	N/A	N/A	▲**13.5**	N/A	N/A	N/A	N/A	N/A	N/A	N/A	N/A	▲**11.8**	N/A	N/A	▲**15.8**
2025	▲**4.98**	▲**6.2**	N/A	N/A	N/A		N/A	▲**1.8**	N/A	N/A	N/A	N/A	N/A	N/A	▲**11.8**	N/A	N/A	
2026	▲**4.98**	▲**6.2**	▲**1.6**	N/A	▲**4.7**		N/A	▲**1.8**	N/A	N/A	▲**4.8**	N/A	▲**1.9**	N/A	▲**11.8**	▲**5.3**	N/A	
Year	(Germany) DE	(European Union) EU	(Baden-Württemberg) BW	(Bavaria) BY	(Berlin) BE	(Brandenburg) BB	(Bremen (state)) HB	(Hamburg) HH	(Hesse) HE	(Lower Saxony) NI	(Mecklenburg-Vorpommern) MV	(North Rhine-Westphalia) NW	(Rhineland-Palatinate) RP	(Saarland) SL	(Saxony) SN	(Saxony-Anhalt) ST	(Schleswig-Holstein) SH	(Thuringia) TH
**Bold** indicates best result to date. Present in legislature (in opposition); Junior coalition partner Senior coalition partner

== Reactions ==
=== The Left (Die Linke) ===
Many members and activists within the party were relieved that Wagenknecht was leaving after months of hinting and speculation. Party members criticised BSW members of the Bundestag for not returning their mandates they had won for The Left. Some politicians of The Left expressed disappointment at the behavior of Wagenknecht's followers. Chairman Martin Schirdewan said that he was "personally disappointed" with the defectors, who he said had damaged the party, and called on them to return their seats in the Bundestag to The Left. The Left vice-chairman Lorenz Gösta Beutin described Wagenknecht's formation of the party as motivated by personal financial gain: "The millionaire Wagenknecht is founding a party for Wagenknecht in order to collect corporate donations for a Wagenknecht party."

The council of Left Youth Solid, the youth wing of The Left, was pleased with Wagenknecht's exit from the party, stating: "Our fight has finally paid off: we were longingly awaiting her departure and called on the party to kick her out. The party can now begin the process of renewal." The Left deputy parliamentary group leader Gesine Lötzsch said that a party founded by Wagenknecht should not be viewed as an opponent or enemy but as competition. She said they would look closely at how this party develops and what positions it takes up from The Left. She added: "The real danger that I see is that our country is moving more and more to the right. If The Left parliamentary group no longer exists in the Bundestag, it will be even more difficult to stand against the governing coalition."

=== Social Democratic Party (SPD) ===
The Social Democratic Party of Germany (SPD) general secretary Kevin Kühnert commented that "Sahra Wagenknecht has been a very established one-woman opposition for 30 years. But there is not a single political measure that is linked to her political activity where something has become better for people", and added that as Wagenknecht is rarely present in the Bundestag, he is not too worried about her new party.

=== Christian Democratic Union (CDU) ===
The Christian Democratic Union of Germany (CDU), which passed a resolution of incompatibility with both The Left and the AfD, discussed ways to deal with BSW. Wagenknecht offered to the CDU a coalition government if there was no majority without the AfD in the 2024 Saxony, Thuringia, and Brandenburg state elections. The Brandenburg CDU parliamentary group leader Jan Redmann said that they should wait and see the next developments, a position that was also reflected by the CDU in Thuringia. CDU deputy party leader Andreas Jung told Die Welt: "Anti-Americanism, proximity to Putin, and socialism are completely incompatible with our stance." Former agriculture minister Julia Klöckner expressed her view that a resolution of incompatibility should also apply to BSW, while Lower Saxony CDU leader Sebastian Lechner stated that there was a need for clarification, as BSW cannot be subsumed under the CDU's incompatibility decision with The Left and AfD, and that Wagenknecht's new party would have to make its own decision. CDU chairman Friedrich Merz said that BSW could take votes from the AfD, while former president Joachim Gauck (who never was a CDU member) commented that BSW could also attract dissatisfied SPD voters.

=== Alternative for Germany (AfD) ===
After the announcement of BSW's formation, the Brandenburg branch of the AfD reportedly feared a loss of votes in eastern Germany for the September 2024 Brandenburg state election.

=== Media ===
In Germany, the Bild described Wagenknecht as a right-wing socialist, while Die Tageszeitung said that she promotes "socialism with a right-wing code". Party researchers generally assume that BSW could challenge the AfD for votes due to its views about the COVID-19 pandemic, the Russian invasion of Ukraine, and migration. Deutschlandfunk commented: "For the AfD, a Wagenknecht party would be direct competition that could cost it a few percentage points and reduce its own voter potential among those disappointed by politics. Both the future Die Linke and the AfD lack charismatic figures like Wagenknecht." T-Online commented that, alongside The Left and the AfD, BSW also posed a threat to the centre-right Free Democratic Party of Germany (FDP), with around 26% of FDP voters willing to consider the party. It argued that although the FDP and BSW are opposites on most issues, with the FDP standing for economic liberalism, the bases of both parties are critical of German migration policy.

About BSW attracting AfD voters, Die Zeit stated: "Even if Wagenknecht wants to limit rather than promote immigration, she is not yet known to have openly racist and right-wing extremist attitudes and resentments. In this respect, it would be welcome if at least some of the AfD voters turned to a Wagenknecht party." Similarly, Der Spiegel argued: "If the party is founded, the new movement could lure away voters from the AfD. That would not be a bad thing on the surface: left-wing populism à la Wagenknecht is still better than a party on the far right. That is why they are afraid of the new group there." Handelsblatt commented that Wagenknecht could do what Merz has failed to do, namely "the halving of the AfD". The Green European Journal argued that BSW might contribute to "saving democracy by fighting the far-right Alternative für Deutschland (AfD) on its own turf".

In Britain, The Spectator questioned whether Wagenknecht would succeed with her party, citing the "element of the personality cult". The Guardian stated that, along with the surge of far-right AfD in the polls, the rise of Wagenknecht's party signals rising discontent of the general population with the ruling Scholz cabinet, which Wagenknecht described as "the worst government in its history"; according to the polls, if an election were to take place in October 2023, BSW could win up to 20% of the national vote. The newspaper also commented that the new party puts The Left at risk of political irrelevance, as the party has long suffered from infighting and declining electoral returns. Political scientist Andrea Römmele described BSW as "an alternative to the Alternative for Germany", arguing that the party could claim support lost by The Left to the AfD in the new states. Political scientist Benjamin Höhne commented: "The niche BSW is opening up – stressing social justice, and at the same time ... [Wagenknecht] positioning herself in a more migration-sceptical way – has potential." In Italy, the Corriere della Sera described BSW as the "mirror image of the AfD".

== See also ==
- Aufstehen
- List of political parties in Germany
