= Nico Rudolph =

German politician (born 1989)

- Rudolph in 2025

Member of the Landtag of Saxony
- Incumbent
- Assumed office 1 October 2024

Personal details
- Born: 1989 (age 36–37)
- Party: Alliance for Social Justice and Economic Reason (since 2024)

Nico Rudolph (born 1989) is a German politician serving as a member of the Landtag of Saxony since 2024. He has served as chairman of the state committee of the Alliance for Social Justice and Economic Reason in Saxony since 2026.
