= Friederike Benda =

German politician

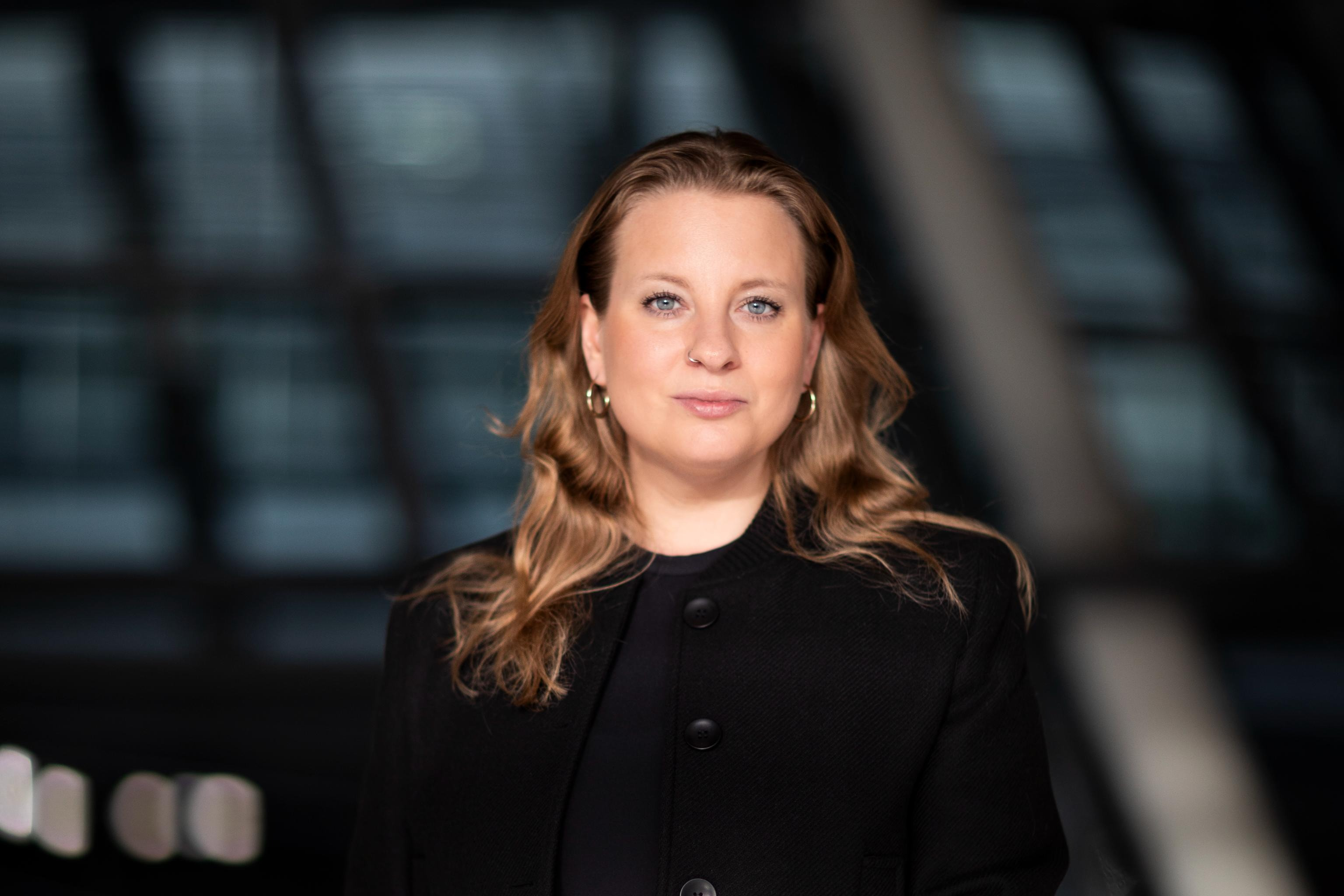
- Benda in 2025

Chair of the Sahra Wagenknecht Alliance in Brandenburg
- Incumbent
- Assumed office 12 July 2025
- Preceded by: Robert Crumbach

Personal details
- Born: Friederike Benda; 1987 (age 38–39) Berlin, Germany
- Party: Sahra Wagenknecht Alliance

Friederike Benda (born 1987) is a German politician (BSW, formerly Die Linke). She is the state chairwoman of the BSW Brandenburg and has been one of the party's deputy federal chairpersons since its founding.

== Life ==
Benda was born in Berlin and studied law and is a lawyer by profession. She lives in the Brandenburg municipality of Birkenwerder (district of Oberhavel).

== Political career ==
Benda was a member of Die Linke for many years. Within the party, she held various positions at the federal level, including as a member of the party's executive committee. She ran in the 2017 German federal election in the Berlin-Charlottenburg – Wilmersdorf constituency and was 11th on the Left Party's state list, but failed to win a seat in the Bundestag. She also ran unsuccessfully in the 2021 election and the 2023 repeat election in the Tempelhof-Schöneberg 1 constituency .

In 2023, she left Die Linke together with Sahra Wagenknecht and other colleagues to prepare for the founding of a new political party. On 8 January 2024, she co-founded the Sahra Wagenknecht Alliance (BSW). At the founding party congress, she was elected deputy party chair.

She ran as the lead candidate for the BSW in Brandenburg in the 2025 German federal election. Her party received 10.71% of the vote in Brandenburg. Nationwide, the BSW received 4.97% of the vote, narrowly missing the five percent hurdle threshold for entering the Bundestag.

At the state party conference in Kleinmachnow on 12 July 2025, she was elected state chairwoman of the Brandenburg BSW.

== Political positions ==
=== Social and economic ===
Benda advocates for an economic policy with high levels of public investment and rejects strict austerity measures such as the debt brake. In July 2025, Benda accused her coalition partner in Brandenburg, the SPD, of a lack of commitment to economic policy. She particularly criticized a planned trade agreement between the European Union and the USA, which she described as an acute threat to Brandenburg's industry and jobs. Benda called for "open resistance" to this so-called tariff deal and reiterated her demand for the lifting of economic sanctions against Russia.

=== Peace policy and foreign policy ===
Benda opposes further armament of the German armed forces and advocates for "diplomatic solutions" to international conflicts. Under Benda's leadership, the Brandenburg branch of the German Armed Forces Association (BSW) called for an end to economic sanctions against Russia and a cap on energy prices. She rejects German arms deliveries to Ukraine and Israel. She criticized the "Zeitenwende speech" proclaimed by Chancellor Olaf Scholz in 2022. In July 2025, a conflict erupted within the Brandenburg governing coalition over the introduction of a mandatory declaration of support for Israel's right to exist in naturalization proceedings. Benda described this step as "instinctless" in light of the Gaza War and the lack of consultation with her party, and called for a coalition committee meeting to clarify the matter. In August 2025, she also criticized the partial halt to arms exports to Israel announced by the German government as insufficient and hardly feasible. Benda demanded instead a complete export ban on all German weapons and diplomatic recognition of the State of Palestine by Germany. In connection with the German government's plans to introduce a new military service, Benda warns against "conscription through the back door." She strongly rejects the plans of Defense Minister Boris Pistorius and criticizes the fact that young people are being "prepared for war under the guise of voluntary service".
