= Metin Kaya =

German politician (born 1961)

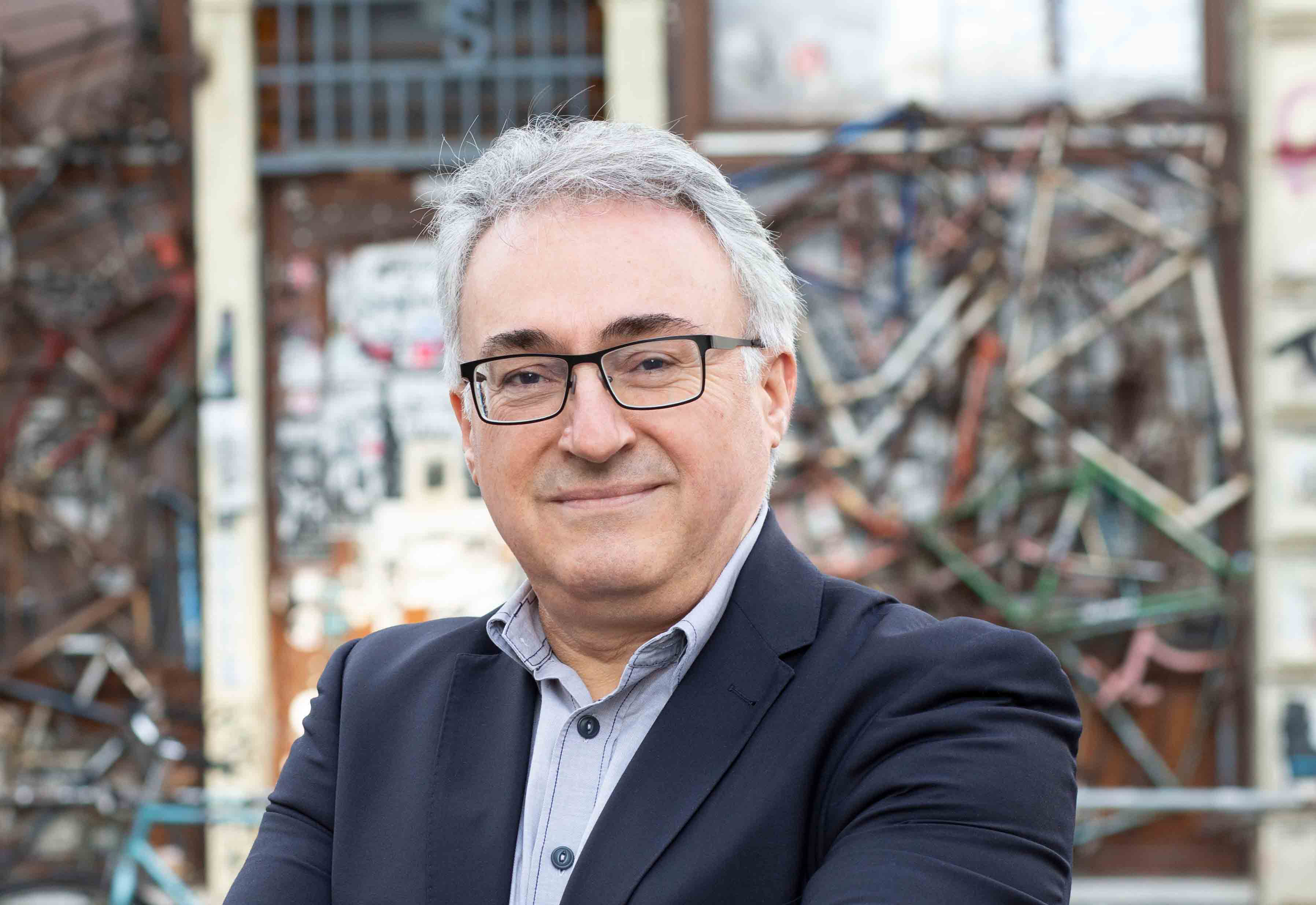
- Metin Kaya in 2021

Member of the Hamburg Parliament
- In office 23 February 2020 – 26 March 2025

Personal details
- Born: 19 July 1961 (age 64) Kağızman, Turkey
- Party: Bündnis Sahra Wagenknecht (since 2023)
- Other political affiliations: Die Linke (until 2023)

Metin Kaya (born 19 July 1961) is a Turkish-born German politician who was a member of the Hamburg Parliament from 2020 to 2025.

== Life ==
Kaya works as a social worker in Hamburg. He was a member of the state executive committee of Die Linke Hamburg.

In the 2020 Hamburg state election, he was elected to the Hamburg Parliament via the state list on 23 February 2020.

On 2 November 2023, Kaya left the Left Party and its parliamentary group. He joined the new party of Sahra Wagenknecht - Bündnis Sahra Wagenknecht.

With the constitution of the 23rd Parliament on March 26, 2025, Kaya left parliament.
