= Jessica Tatti =

German politician (born 1981)

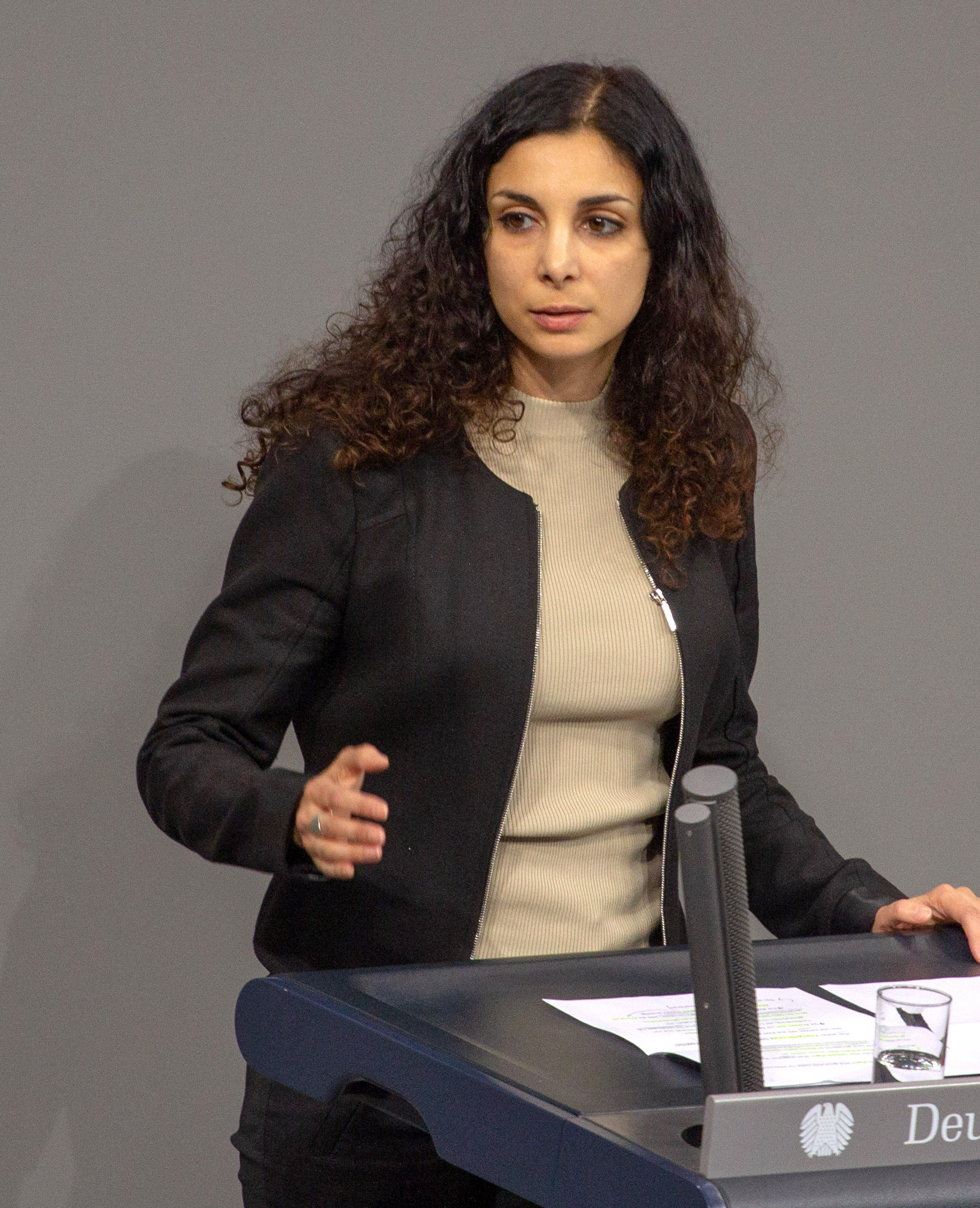
- Jessica Tatti in 2019

Member of the Bundestag
- In office 24 October 2017 – 23 February 2025

Personal details
- Born: 22 April 1981 (age 44) Marbach am Neckar, West Germany
- Citizenship: Germany
- Party: Bündnis Sahra Wagenknecht (since 2023)
- Other political affiliations: The Left (until 2023)

Jessica Tatti (born 22 April 1981) is a German politician (BSW, former The Left). Born in Marbach am Neckar, Baden-Württemberg, she was member of German Bundestag from the state of Baden-Württemberg from 2017 to 2025. She switched party from The Left in October 2023 to "Bündnis Sahra Wagenknecht".

== Life ==
She is of Italian descent. Her grandparents hail from Sardinia. Tatti studied social work at the Protestant University of Applied Sciences in Ludwigsburg and was employed in the corresponding professional field after her bachelor's degree: In 2010, she moved to Reutlingen and initially worked in urban youth work; before her parliamentary mandate in the German Bundestag, she most recently worked in social services in refugee care for the Esslingen district association of Arbeiterwohlfahrt (AWO). She became member of the Bundestag after the 2017 German federal election. She is a member of the Committee for Labour and Social Affairs.

In October 2023 she declared that she would quit Die Linke and follow Sahra Wagenknecht into her new party. Tatti rejected the demand to resign from the Bundestag mandate she had won through Die Linke.

Tatti organized the new party in Baden-Württemberg and was one of the founders of the state organisation.

She ran as top candidate for BSW Baden-Württemberg at 2025 German Federal election. The BSW received less than 5 percent and did not enter the Bundestag. In July 2025 her personal homepage was offline.
