= Astrid Schramm =

German politician

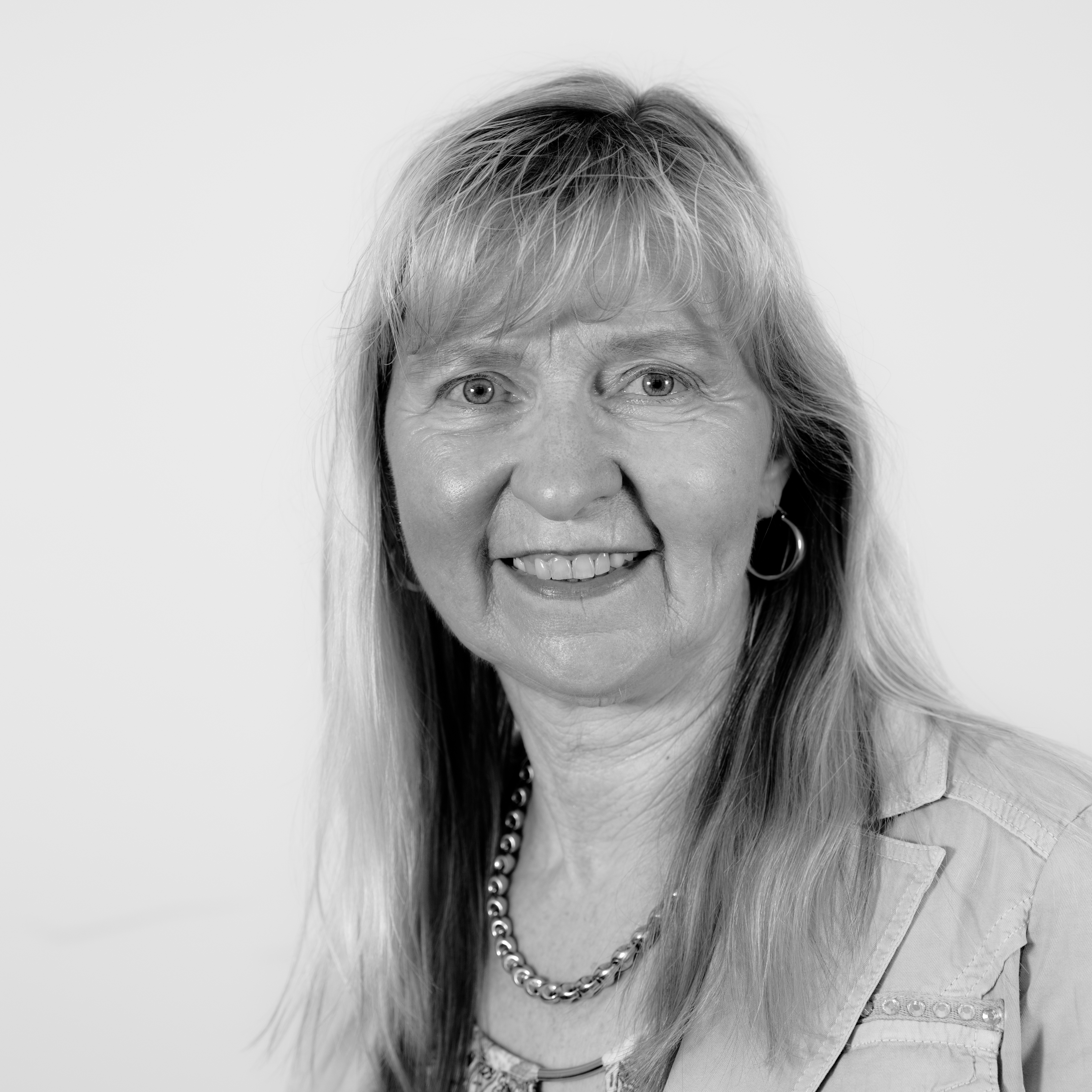
- Schramm in 2017

State Chairwoman of the Sahra Wagenknecht Alliance in Saarland
- Incumbent
- Assumed office 22 March 2024

Member of the Landtag of Saarland
- In office 2009–2022

Personal details
- Born: 3 May 1956 (age 70) Saarbrücken, Saarland (then West Germany)
- Party: BSW (since 2024)
- Other party: Die Linke (2009–2021); SPD (before 2009)

Astrid Schramm (born 3 May 1956) is a German politician. Since 2024 she has been the state chairwoman of the Sahra Wagenknecht Alliance in Saarland. From 2009 to 2022 she was a member of the Landtag of Saarland for the party Die Linke.

== Life ==
Astrid Schramm is a trained industrial clerk. She worked as a government employee and was a member of the staff council of the Saarland Ministry of Culture.

=== State politics ===
Schramm was chairwoman of the Die Linke Saarland from 2013 to 2017. Before being involved in The Left, she was already a member of the Social Democratic Party (SPD).

After the 2009 Saarland state election, she became a member of the Landtag of Saarland, where she remained until March 2022. She was deputy chairwoman and health policy spokeswoman for her parliamentary group. She was a member of the Committees for Education, Culture and Media (BKM), for Data Protection and Freedom of Information (DI), for Economic Affairs, Labour, Transport, Energy and Mine Safety (WAVEG) and for Social Affairs, Health, Women and Families (SGFF).

Schramm was involved in a long-standing rift within the Left Party in Saarland and was considered a confidante of the long-standing parliamentary group leader Oskar Lafontaine. The latter accused the regional chairman and Member of the German Bundestag Thomas Lutze of only having been elected to these positions through manipulation and money payments to party members. In this context, Schramm reported Lutze and made this public in several interviews. Lutze's immunity was then lifted. In the subsequent investigation, however, no criminal offenses could be proven against him. Lutze then applied for Schramm to be expelled from the party.

In June 2021, the Saarland state arbitration commission of the Left Party expelled Schramm from the party. She had made internal party conflicts public and thus damaged the party. In January 2022, the Federal Arbitration Court of the Left Party confirmed the party expulsion. Schramm announced that she would not take any further steps against it. She retained her functions in the state parliamentary group until the end of the legislative period. She did not run again in the 2022 Saarland state election.

Schramm joined the newly founded Sahra Wagenknecht Alliance in 2024.

On 22 March 2024, she was elected state chairwoman of the Saarland regional association of the BSW in Merzig, together with Randolf Jobstt, who resigned on 14 June 2024 after Schramm's statement on a "conceivable" local political cooperation with the Alternative for Germany (AfD).

=== Local politics ===
Schramm was chairwoman of the Saarbrücken district association and the Köllerbach - Püttlingen local association within the Left Party. The local association dissolved in early February 2022, as a large proportion of its members left the party after Schramm was expelled from the party.

From the 2019 local elections, she was a member of the Püttlingen city council as chairwoman of the two-member Left Party faction. She retained this position even after her expulsion from the party.
