= Ali Al-Dailami =

German-Yemeni politician (born 1981)

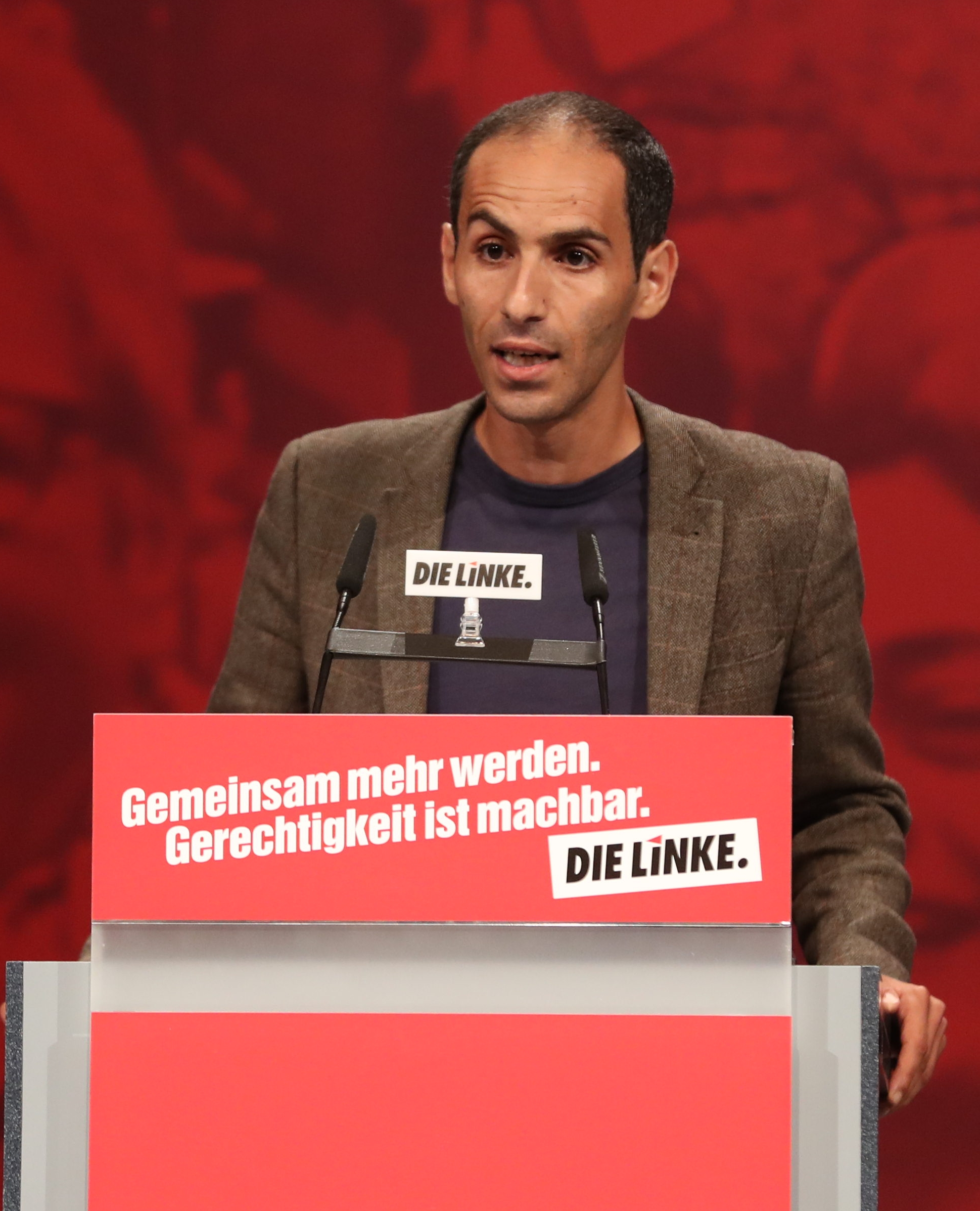
- Al-Dailami in 2018

Member of the Bundestag
- In office 26 October 2021 – 23 February 2025
- Constituency: Hesse

Personal details
- Born: Ali Abass Yahya Al-Dailami; 27 December 1981 (age 44) Sanaa, Yemen Arab Republic
- Party: BSW (2023–present)
- Other political affiliations: The Left (2006–2023)

Ali Abass Yahya Al-Dailami (Arabic: علي عباس يحيى الديلمي; born 27 December 1981) is a German-Yemeni politician who has been serving as member of the Bundestag since 2021. He was one of six deputy leaders of The Left from 2018 to 2023, before joining the newly formed Sahra Wagenknecht Alliance.

== Early life ==
Al-Dailami was born in 1981 in Sanaa, North Yemen. When he was eight years old, his family fled to Germany as refugees. He attended elementary school in Sankt Julian in the state of Rhineland-Palatinate. Ali's mother died when he was twelve years old, and he was placed in a children's home at his own request. He lived at several different Children and Youth Services facilities, including one in Lich, Hesse.

Upon turning 18, Al-Dailami dropped out of school and moved to Giessen. There, he earned his Mittlere Reife at a night school. He was dependent on unemployment benefits and, among other things, did contract work for Canon on an assembly line and in a warehouse, among other things. He then took an apprenticeship as a restaurant clerk.

== Political career ==
Al-Dailami joined The Left in 2006. The same year, he co-founded the Left Youth Solid branch in Giessen and became its spokesman. He was also elected to the executive committee of The Left's Giessen association. From 2007 to 2008, he was a member of the party's Hessian state executive. He was also spokesman for the state working group on migration, integration and anti-racism from 2007 to 2012, when he became federal spokesman for the same topics. The next year, he became chairman of the Giessen party association. He was elected to The Left's federal executive in 2008, and as one of six deputy leaders in 2018.

Al-Dailami ran in the 2013 German federal election in the Gießen constituency, winning 5.1% of votes. He was sixth on the state party list but was not elected. He ran again in 2017 and won 6.3%, again failing to enter the Bundestag. He unsuccessfully ran in the 2019 European Parliament election.

While campaigning in April 2014, Al-Dailami was assaulted and required hospital treatment. He filed a criminal complaint against his attacker.

In the 2021 German federal election, Al-Dailami was the lead candidate for The Left in Hesse. He was second on the state party list, behind federal lead candidate Janine Wissler, and was elected to the Bundestag. He won 4.0% of votes in the Gießen constituency.

Within the party, Al-Dailami is considered an ally of Sahra Wagenknecht.

During the 2021 Chilean general election, Al-Dailami endorsed Apruebo Dignidad candidate Gabriel Boric.

On the a press-conference on 23 October 2023 the Sahra Wagenknecht presented her new party BSW. Al-Dailami is one of the MPs who left The Left and joined Wagenknecht's party. This was announced that day.

Ali Al-Dailami was running as top candidate for BSW Hessian at 2025 German Federal election. The BSW received less than 5 percent and did not enter the Bundestag.

== Personal life ==
Al-Dailami has eleven siblings, including half-siblings. He is an atheist.
