= Andreas Hartenfels =

German politician (born 1966)

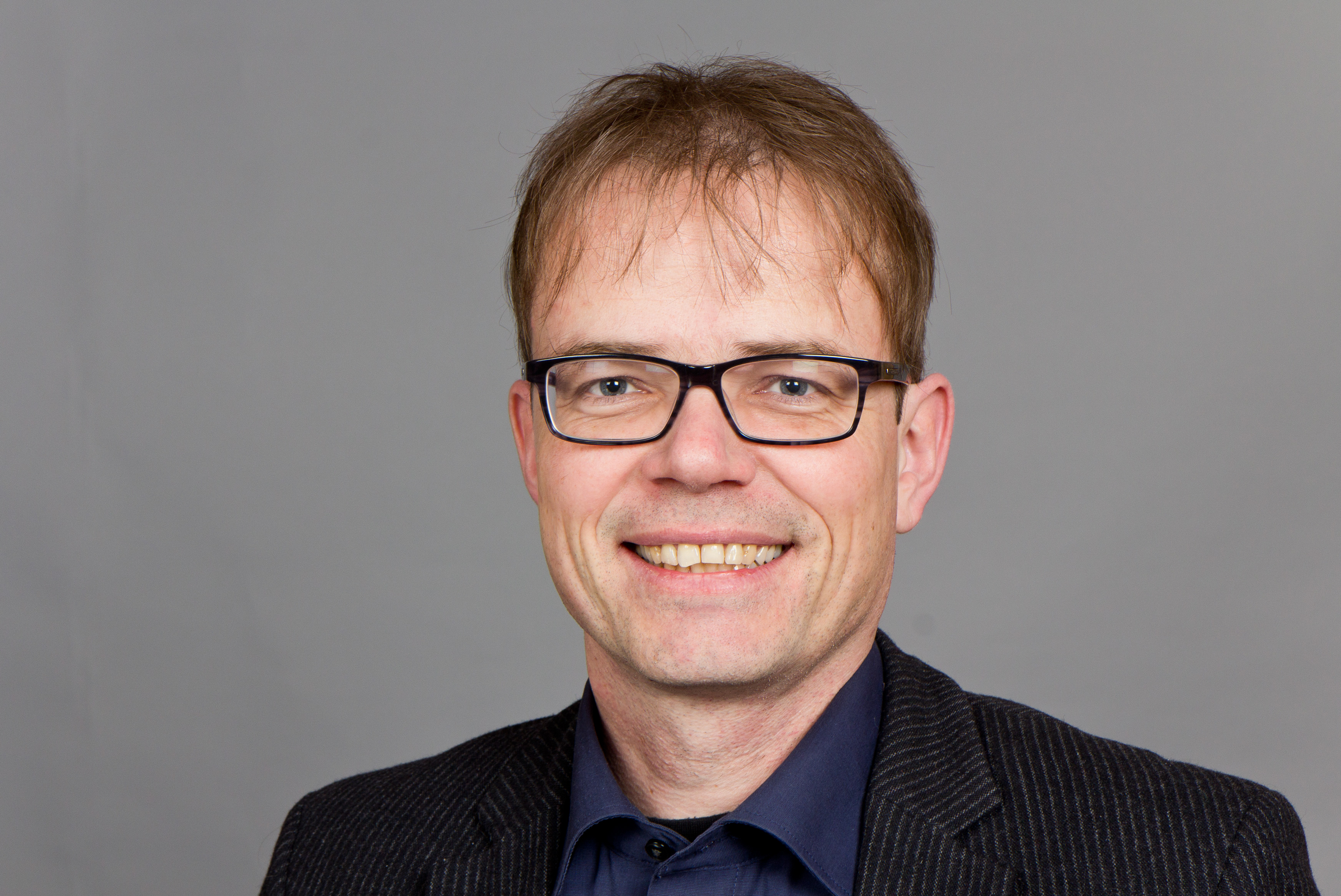
- Andreas Hartenfels in 2014

Member of the Landtag of Rhineland-Palatinate
- Incumbent
- Assumed office 2011

Personal details
- Born: 20 August 1966 (age 60) Bad Sobernheim
- Party: Bündnis Sahra Wagenknecht (since 2024)
- Other political affiliations: Alliance 90/The Greens (1984 to 2022)
- Education: University of Kassel

Andreas Hartenfels (born 20 August 1966) is a German politician. He is a member of Bündnis Sahra Wagenknecht and previously the Alliance 90/The Greens. He has been a member of the Landtag of Rhineland-Palatinate since 2011.

== Leben ==
After graduating from high school in 1985, Hartenfels studied urban and landscape planning at the University of Kassel, graduating in 1990 with a degree in landscape planning. From 1990 to 1992, he then trained as a senior building inspector for landscape management in the Ministry of the Environment of the State of Rhineland-Palatinate. From 1992 to 1995, he again attended the University of Kassel, graduating with a degree in landscape ecology. Since 1996, he has been a self-employed urban and landscape planner with his own planning office in Nanzdietschweiler.

== Political career ==
Hartenfels joined the Alliance 90/The Greens party in 1984. He has been a member of the Kusel district council since 1996 and was the parliamentary group spokesman for Alliance 90/The Greens until 2021. He has been a member of the Rhineland-Palatinate state parliament since 2011. He was chairman of the Committee on Economic Affairs, Climate Protection, Energy and Regional Planning, a member of the Committee on Environment, Forestry, Agriculture, Food and Viticulture, and the specialist policy spokesman for the environment and nature conservation, construction/housing and regional planning for the Green parliamentary group. In the 18th legislative period, he is a member of the Committee on Climate, Energy and Mobility and a member of the Committee on Environment and Forestry.

On 27 October 2022, Hartenfels resigned from the Alliance 90/The Greens party and at the same time left the parliamentary group. He justified his resignation with the decisions made by a majority at the Federal Delegates' Conference in October 2022 as a result of the Russian invasion of Ukraine, mainly due to the decision to supply heavy weapons to Ukraine and further due to the decisions on nuclear power plants and investments in the Bundeswehr.

In January 2024, Hartenfels joined the Bündnis Sahra Wagenknecht.

== Literature ==
- Der Präsident des Landtags Rheinland-Pfalz (Hrsg.): Die Stellvertreter des freien Volkes. Die Abgeordneten der Beratenden Landesversammlung und des Landtags Rheinland-Pfalz von 1946 bis 2015. Springer VS, Wiesbaden 2016, ISBN 978-3-658-04750-4, S. 264–265.
