= Sebastian Lechner =

German politician (born 1980)

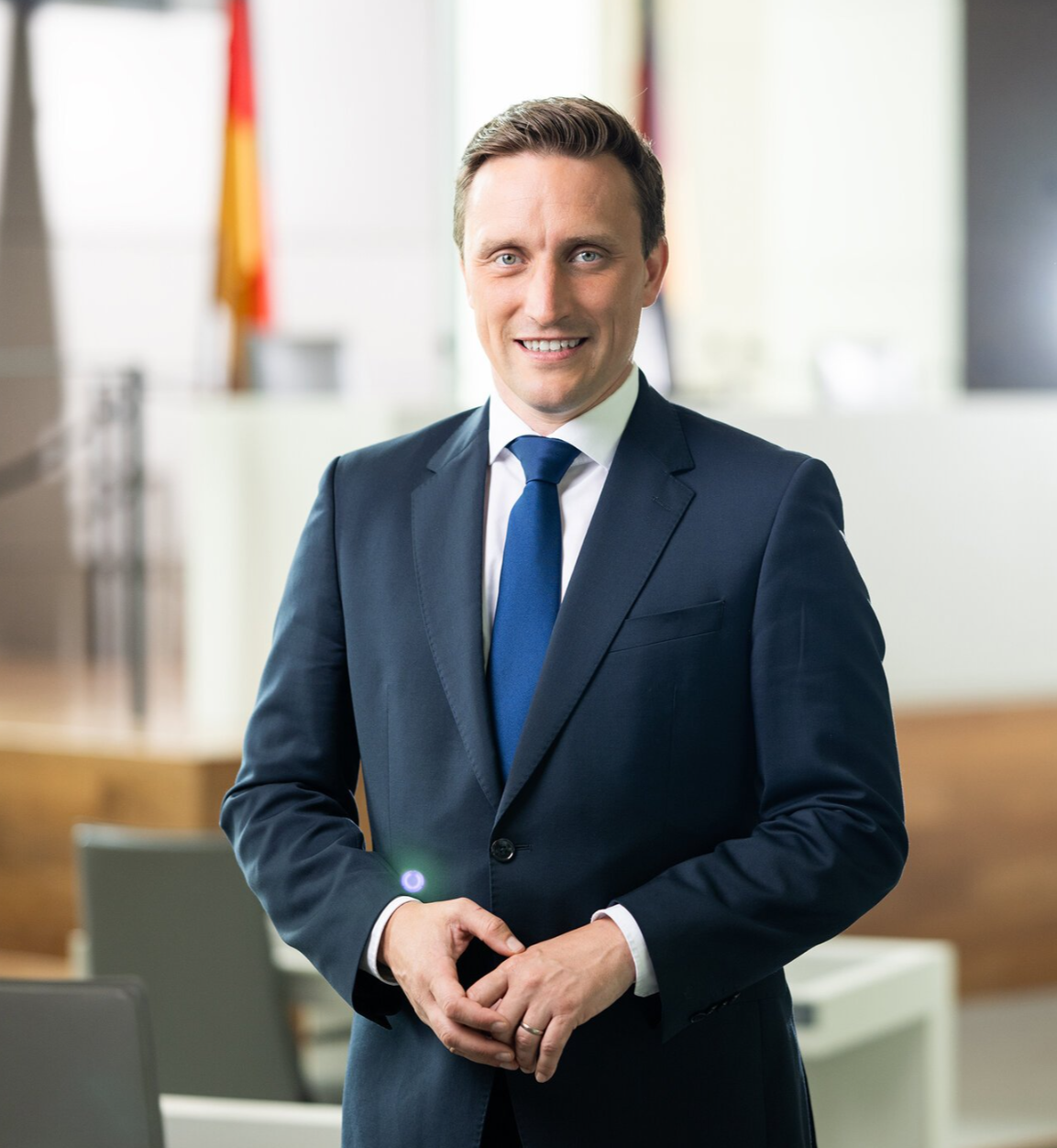
- Lechner in 2024

Member of the Landtag of Lower Saxony
- Incumbent
- Assumed office 19 February 2013

Personal details
- Born: 21 November 1980 (age 45)
- Party: Christian Democratic Union

Sebastian Lechner (born 21 November 1980) is a German politician serving as a member of the Landtag of Lower Saxony since 2013. He has served as group leader of the Christian Democratic Union and leader of the opposition since 2022, and as state president of the party since 2023.
