= Jan-Peter Warnke =

German politician (born 1959)

Jan-Peter Warnke MEP
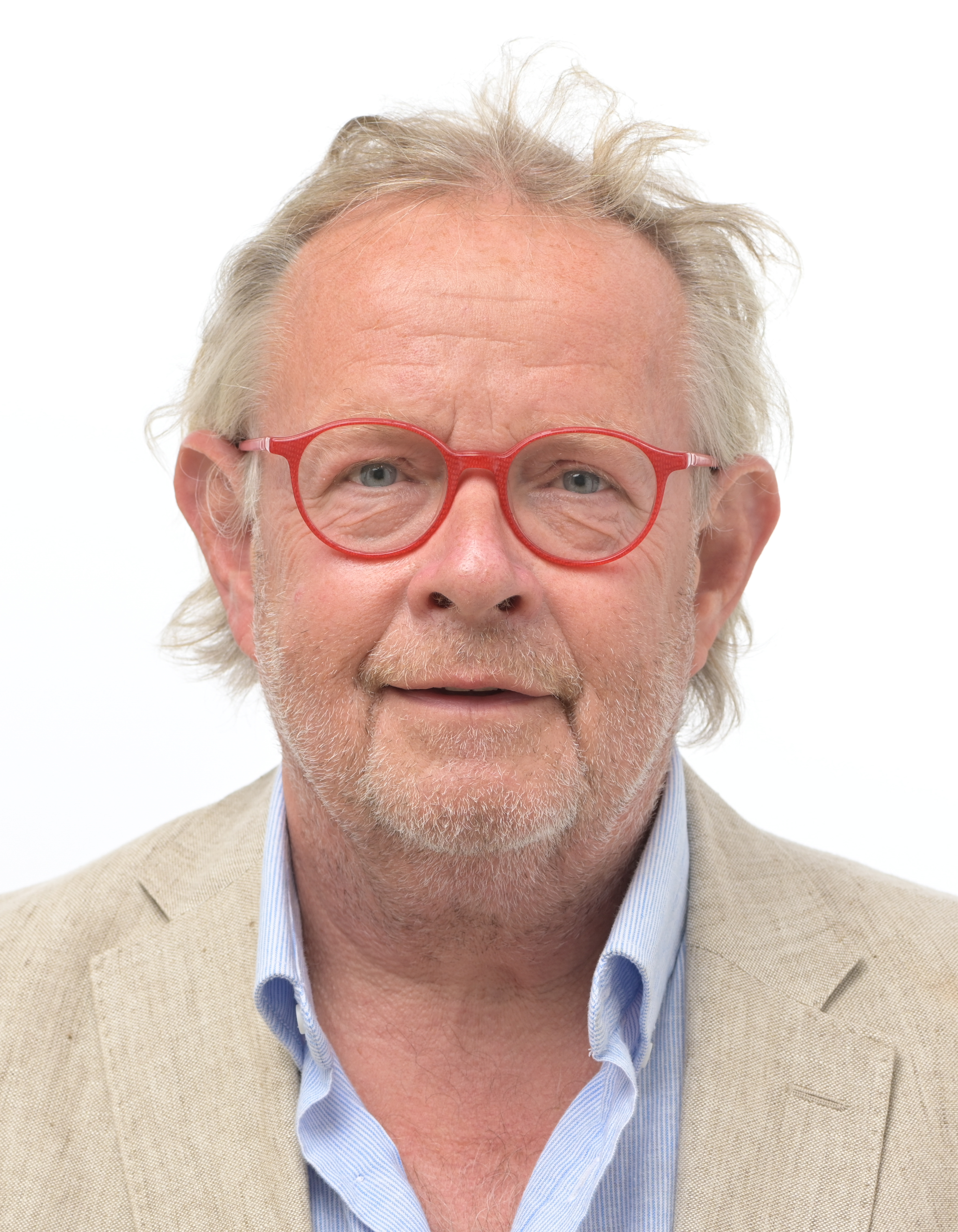

Member of the European Parliament for Germany
- Incumbent
- Assumed office 16 July 2024

Personal details
- Born: 1959 (age 66–67) East Germany
- Party: Bündnis Sahra Wagenknecht
- Education: Humboldt University

Jan-Peter Warnke (born 1959) is a German politician from Bündnis Sahra Wagenknecht. In the 2024 European Parliament election he was elected a Member of the European Parliament (MEP).

== Life ==
Warnke went to school in East Berlin and studied at the Humboldt University of Berlin. From 1984 to 1985 he went to Budapest, Hungary to train as a neurosurgeon and in 1987 he fled to West Germany, where he continued his training. He then worked for 18 months at the University Hospital of Sheffield in England and later at the University Hospital of Aachen as senior physician and at the Heinrich Braun Hospital in Zwickau as chief physician. A few years later, Warnke became professor at the chair of neurosurgery at the University of Mainz and professor of health administration at the West Saxon University of Applied Sciences in Zwickau. After the merger of the Heinrich Braun Hospital with the Paracelsus Hospital in Zwickau, concerns arose that the neurosurgery department under Warnke's leadership would no longer be able to continue as before, as Warnke was world-renowned for his operations on arachnoiditis.

Warnke has lived on the island of Usedom since 2023. In the same year he retired as a doctor.

== Political career ==
In 2024, Warnke joined the new political party Bündnis Sahra Wagenknecht as one of its first members. In the 2024 European elections, Warnke was elected to the European Parliament as fifth place on BSW's list.

== Political positions ==
Warnke's political priorities are health and science policy.

== Memberships ==
- Member of the Board of the Vigdis Thompson Foundation

== See also ==
- List of members of the European Parliament (2024–2029)
