= Christian Leye =

German politician (born 1981)

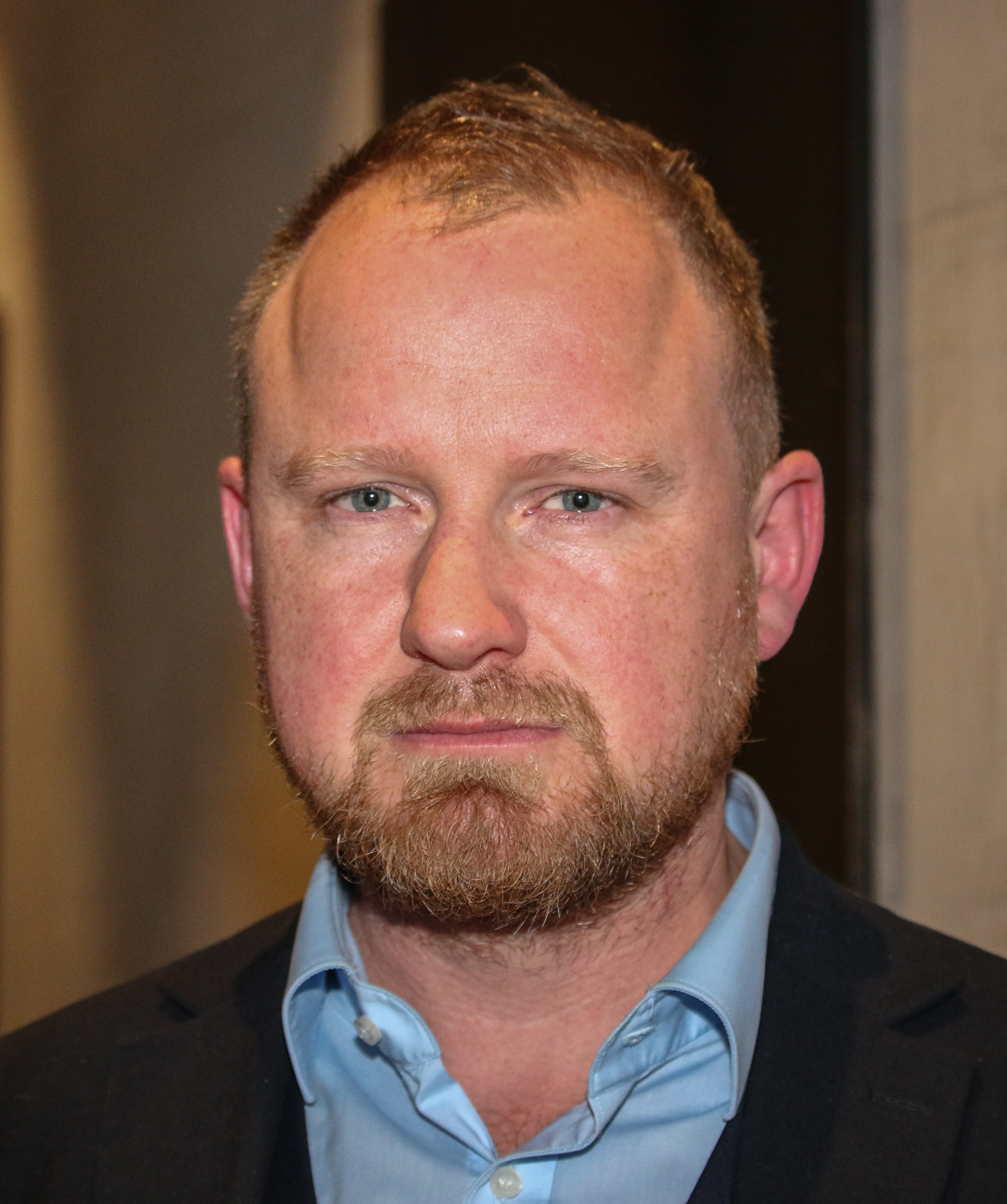
- Leye in 2025

Member of the German Bundestag
- In office 27 October 2021 – 23 February 2025
- Constituency: North Rhine-Westphalia

Personal details
- Born: 6 April 1981 (age 45) Bochum, North Rhine-Westphalia, West Germany
- Party: BSW (2023–present)
- Other political affiliations: The Left (until 2023)
- Education: University of Göttingen (MA)

Christian Leye (born 6 April 1981) is a German politician (BSW, formerly Die Linke). He was a Member of the German Bundestag for North Rhine-Westphalia from 2021 to 2025.

== Career ==
Born in Bochum, Leye has been the state chairman of Die Linke in North Rhine-Westphalia since 2016. He contested Duisburg II at the 2021 federal election. He won a seat on the party list.

Leye founded the pre-association for the new party of Sahra Wagenknecht BSW. On a press-conference on 23 October 2023 he announced that he will leave The Left and join Bündnis Sahra Wagenknecht.
