= Alexander Ulrich =

German politician

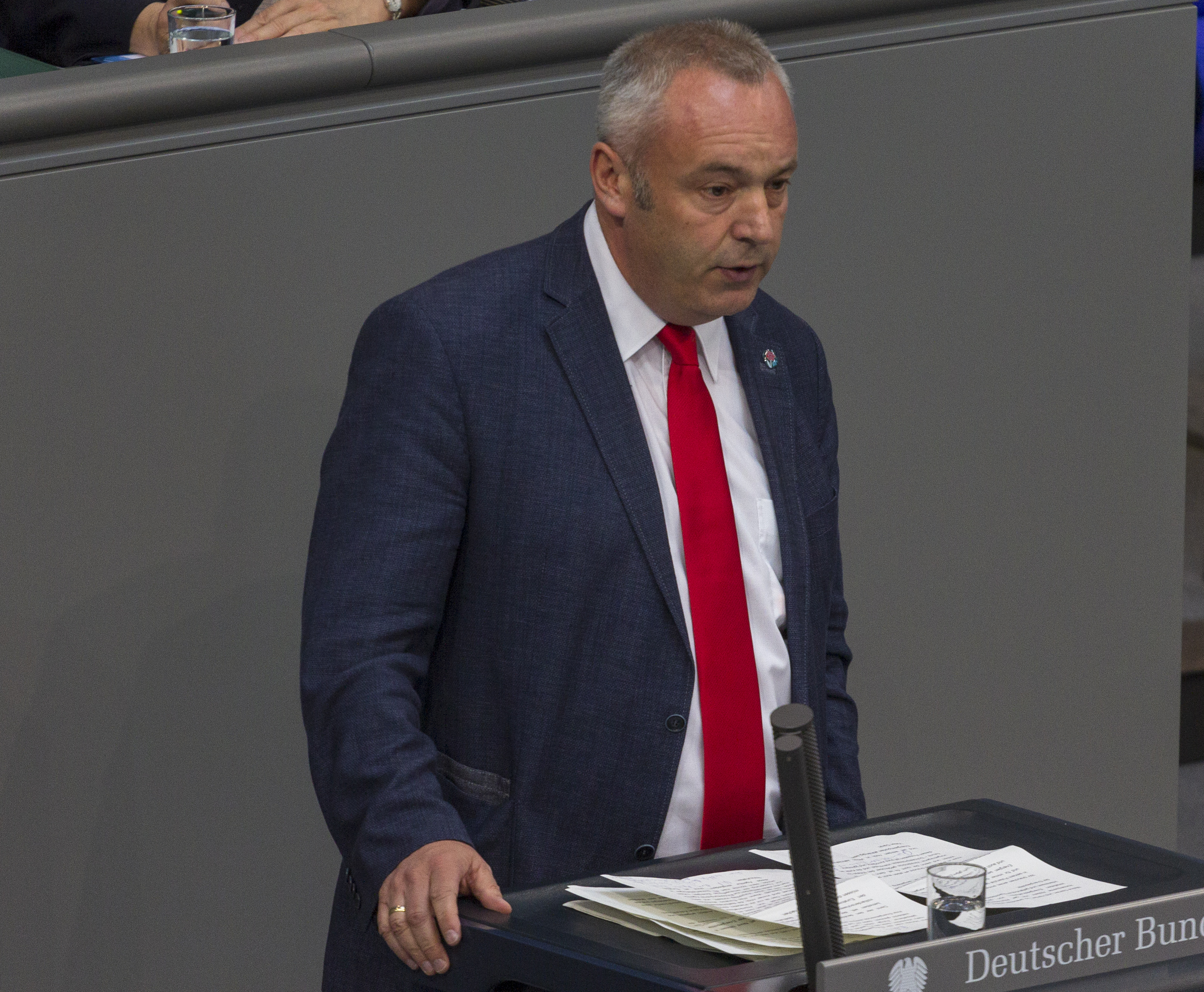
- Ulrich in 2019

Former Member of the Bundestag
- In office 18 October 2005 – 23 February 2025

Personal details
- Born: 11 February 1971 (age 55) Kusel, West Germany (now Germany)
- Party: BSW (since 2023)
- Other political affiliations: SPD (1998–2004); WASG (2004–2007); The Left (2007–2023)
- Children: 2

Alexander Ulrich (born 11 February 1971) is a German politician. Born in Kusel, Rhineland-Palatinate, he was elected for The Left. In 2023 he switched to BSW. Alexander Ulrich has served as a member of the Bundestag from the state of Rhineland-Palatinate from 2005 to 2025.

== Life ==
After attending secondary school, Ulrich began training as a toolmaker in 1987, which he completed in 1990. Afterwards he worked in his learned profession at Opel AG, where he was released from work as a member of the works council from 1994 to 1998. In 1998, he moved to IG Metall Kaiserslautern as the 2nd authorized representative and managing director. He became member of the bundestag after the 2005 German federal election, serving until the 2025 German federal election. He was a member of the Committee on Economic and Energy Affairs and the Committee on European Union Affairs.
