= Next elections in Germany =

Next elections in Germany may refer to:

2027

- 2027 Saarland state election
- 2027 Schleswig-Holstein state election
- 2027 North Rhine-Westphalia state election
- 2027 Bremen state election
- 2027 Lower Saxony state election

2028 and later

- 2028 Bavarian state election
- 2028 Hessian state election
- 2029 German federal election
- 2029 Brandenburg state election
- Next Saxony state election [de]
- 2029 Thuringian state election
- 2030 Hamburg state election [de]
- 2031 Baden-Württemberg state election [de]
- 2031 Rhineland-Palatinate state election [de]

== See also ==
- Elections in Germany
