= Stefan Roth (politician) =

German politician (born 1987)

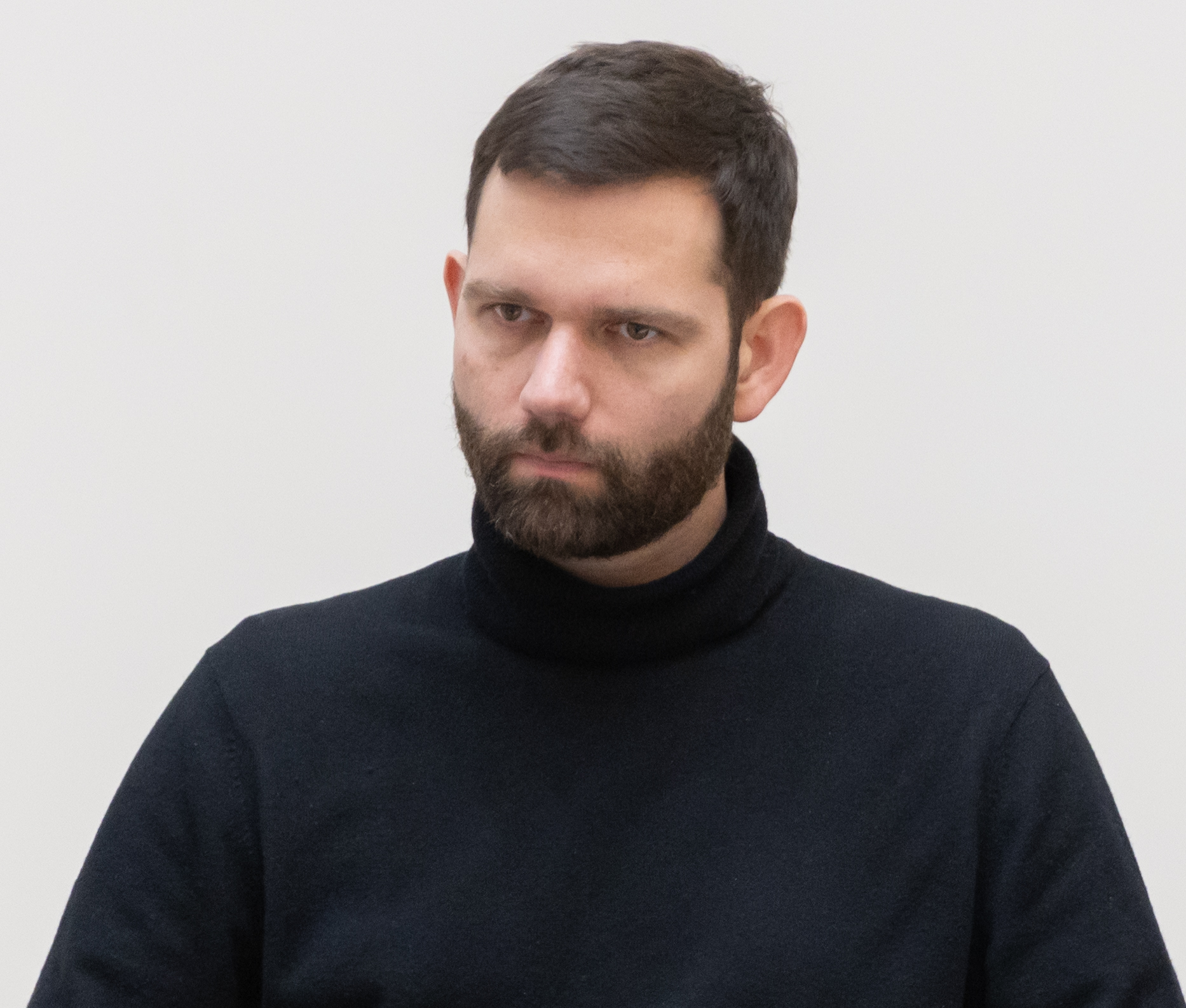
- Roth in 2025

Member of the Landtag of Brandenburg
- Incumbent
- Assumed office 17 October 2024

Personal details
- Born: 17 April 1987 (age 38) Altdöbern, East Germany
- Party: Sahra Wagenknecht Alliance

Stefan Roth (born 17 April 1987 in Altdöbern) is a German politician serving as a member of the Landtag of Brandenburg since 2024. He has served as managing director of the Sahra Wagenknecht Alliance in Brandenburg since 2023.
