= Katrin Lompscher =

German politician (born 1962)

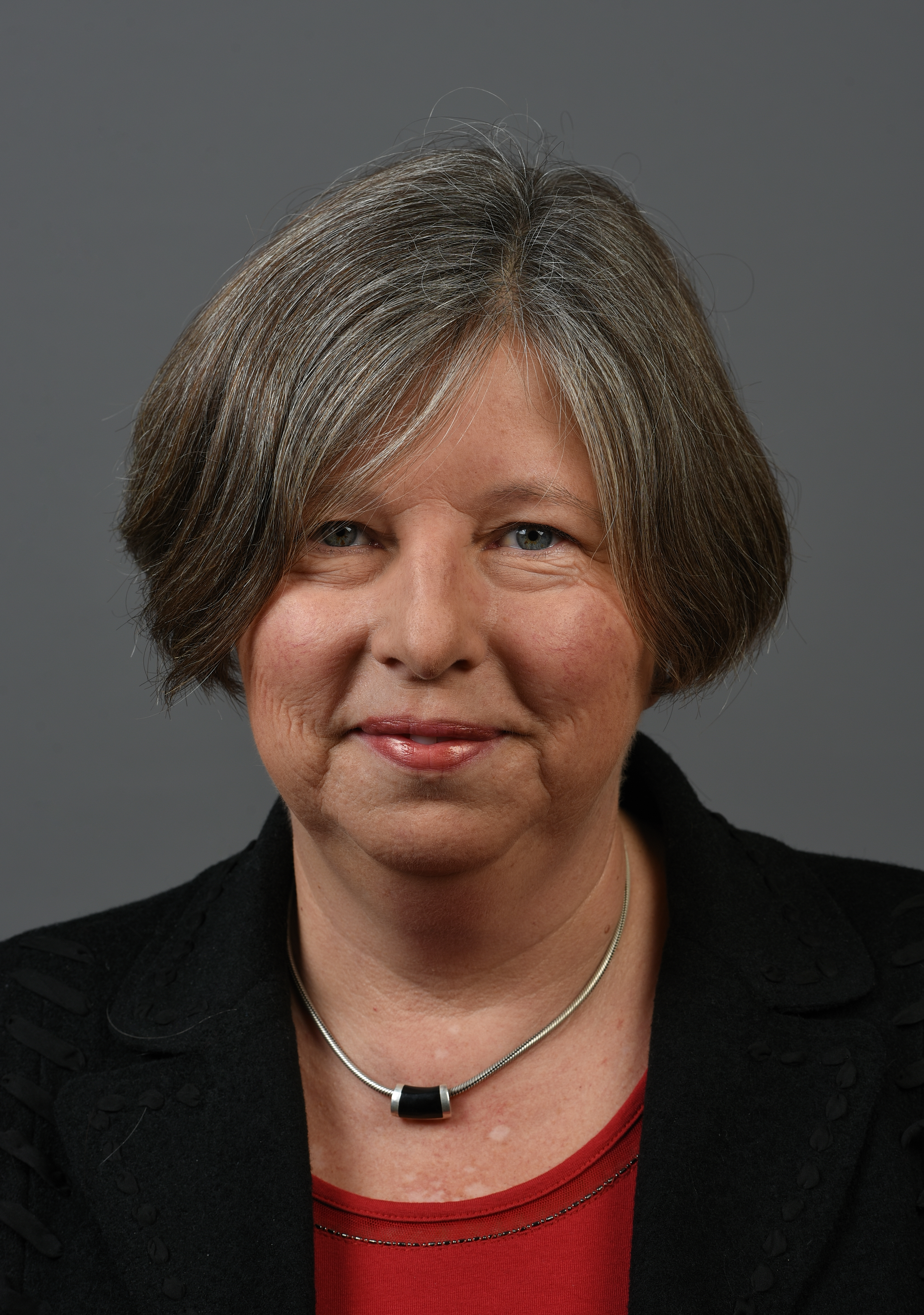
- Lompscher in 2017

Senator for Urban Development and Housing of Berlin
- In office 8 December 2016 – 2 August 2020
- Governing Mayor: Michael Müller
- Preceded by: Andreas Geisel

Senator for Health, Environment and Consumer Protection of Berlin
- In office 23 November 2006 – 24 November 2011
- Governing Mayor: Klaus Wowereit
- Preceded by: Heidi Knake-Werner
- Succeeded by: Mario Czaja

Member of the Abgeordnetenhaus of Berlin
- In office 18 September 2011 – 31 January 2017
- Constituency: DIE LINKE List

Personal details
- Born: 7 April 1962 (age 64) East Berlin, East Germany
- Party: The Left
- Profession: Politician

Katrin Lompscher (born 7 April 1962) is a German politician who served as Senator for Urban Development and Housing in Berlin in the Senate of Governing Mayor Michael Müller from 2016 to 2020. A member of The Left, she previously served as Senator for Health, Environment and Consumer Protection from 2006 to 2011 in the third Senate of Governing Mayor Klaus Wowereit, and as a member of the Abgeordnetenhaus (House of Representatives) of Berlin from 2011 until her resignation in 2017.

== Life ==
Born in East Berlin, German Democratic Republic, Lompscher grew up in a three child household. In 1981, she completed vocational training and began her career as a construction worker. Lompscher graduated from Bauhaus University, Weimar in 1986 with a degree in civil engineering. After giving birth to her son, she worked as a research assistant at the Institute of Urban Design and Architecture at the Bauakademie in Berlin.

== Political career ==
In 1981, Lompscher joined the Socialist Unity Party of Germany, but held no political office in the party. After German reunification, Lompscher became a member of the Party of Democratic Socialism (PDS), and remained a member of the party until its merger with the Electoral Alternative for Labor and Social Justice (WASG) to become The Left. From 1996 to 2000, Lompscher served as a research fellow for the PDS Group in the Abgeordnetenhaus. Lompscher was a district councilor for urban development in Lichtenberg from December 2001 to October 2006. In this position Lompscher helped implement the environmental zone in Berlin, a creation of the Senate of Berlin in an attempt to reduce pollution. After the foundation of the Berlin State Association of The Left, she served as its deputy chairperson.

From 2006 to 2011, Lompscher served as Senator for Health, Environment and Consumer Protection in Berlin. Following the 2011 Berlin state election, Lompscher was elected to the Abgeordnetenhaus. While in the body, Lompscher served as Deputy Leader of Die Linke’s parliamentary group and as its spokesperson for Urban Development, Building and Housing.

After the 2016 state election, the Social Democratic Party (SPD)-led grand coalition government with the conservative Christian Democratic Union (CDU) no longer had the numbers in the Abgeordnetenhaus to continue. As such, Governing Mayor Michael Müller of the SPD formed a red-red-green coalition consisting of the SPD, The Left, and Alliance 90/The Greens. On 8 December 2016, Lompscher returned to the Senate as Senator for Urban Development and Housing. On 31 January 2017 she resigned from the Abgeordnetenhaus and was replaced by fellow party member Philipp Bertram.

== Political positions ==
Lompscher, a self-described “pleasure smoker”, is an advocate for non-smoker protection, but has spoken out against what she calls a “militant smoking ban”.
