= Aufstehen =

German left-wing political movement

Aufstehen's logo since 2018

Aufstehen (German: Stand up) is a left-wing collective movement founded by politician Sahra Wagenknecht in 2018. Its co-founders and participants included leading members of Germany's left-oriented parties as well as supporters from science and the arts. Their aims were to exert pressure on German political parties and to bring about a shift to the left in politics and society. This included focusing on the issues concerning voters lost to new right-wing movements which have recently emerged in German politics. Inspirations for the movement included Jean-Luc Mélenchon's movement La France Insoumise and Momentum, the organisation founded in support of the British Labour Party leader Jeremy Corbyn.

After Wagenknecht withdrew from the leadership of the movement in March 2019 and a number of its other notable figures subsequently turned away from it, the initiative became less prominent.

== Founding ==
The founding of the movement had been debated for months when its website was launched on 4 August 2018. It was officially launched on 4 September 2018 at a press conference in Berlin. Among the founders are members of The Left, the SPD and the Greens. Notable figures involved include the sociologist Wolfgang Streeck and SPD politician Simone Lange, who was defeated for the leadership of the party in 2018 by Andrea Nahles. The background to the founding of the movement is the surge of right-wing parties worldwide, including Germany. The founders of Aufstehen argue against the rise in social injustice and urge leftist parties to unite in order to bring about a change in German politics. Wagenknecht has also stated that the continuation of the grand coalition of the CDU/CSU and the SPD after the 2017 federal election was also a stimulus to the founding of the movement, arguing that this would lead to a continuation of policies that would increase economic inequality and insecurity and benefit far-right groups such as the Alternative for Germany.

== Policies ==
Aufstehen, an "extreme left" collective, is according to some media "hostile toward immigration". Wagenknecht, who advocates "against an open-border policy for Germany", considers open borders to be politically naïve.

== See also ==
- Bündnis Sahra Wagenknecht
- The Left (Germany)
