= Norbert Röttgen =

German politician (born 1965)

Norbert Röttgen MdB
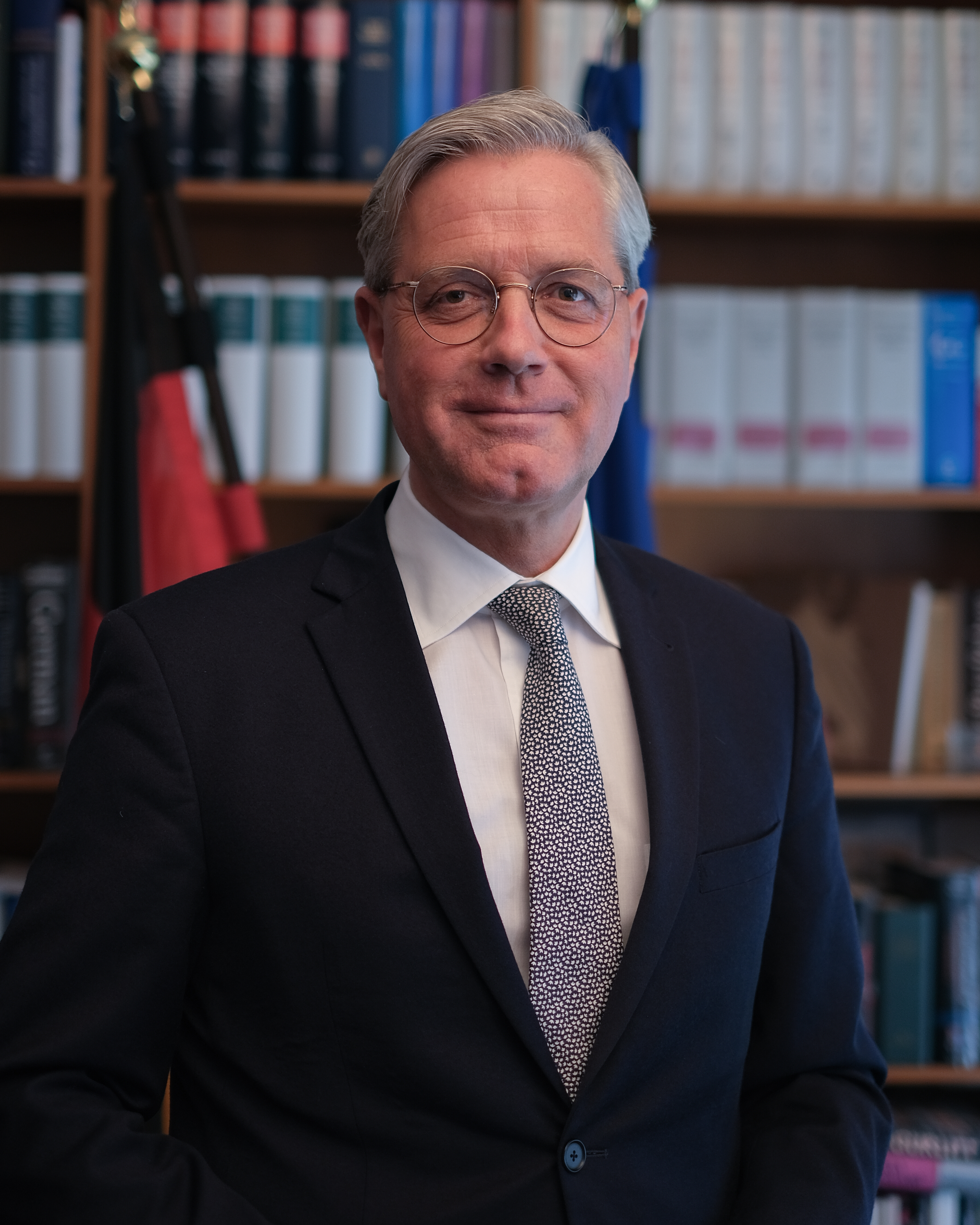
- Röttgen in 2021

Member of the CDU Committee
- Incumbent
- Assumed office 16 January 2021 Serving with Bernd Althusmann, Monika Grütters, Michael Kretschmer, Karl-Josef Laumann, Annette Widmann-Mauz and Reiner Haseloff
- Leader: Armin Laschet; Friedrich Merz
- Preceded by: Jens Spahn

Chair of the Committee on Foreign Affairs
- In office 15 January 2014 – 15 December 2021
- Deputy: Franz Thönnes; Daniela De Ridder
- Preceded by: Ruprecht Polenz (2013)
- Succeeded by: Michael Roth

Minister for the Environment, Nature Conservation and Nuclear Safety
- In office 28 October 2009 – 16 May 2012
- Chancellor: Angela Merkel
- Preceded by: Sigmar Gabriel
- Succeeded by: Peter Altmaier

Deputy Leader of the Christian Democratic Union
- In office 15 November 2010 – 5 December 2012
- Leader: Angela Merkel
- Preceded by: Roland Koch
- Succeeded by: Armin Laschet

Leader of the Christian Democratic Union in North Rhine-Westphalia
- In office 6 November 2010 – 13 May 2012
- General Secretary: Oliver Wittke
- Deputy: Ursula Heinen-Esser; Armin Laschet; Karl-Josef Laumann; Michaela Noll; Sven Volmering
- Preceded by: Jürgen Rüttgers
- Succeeded by: Armin Laschet

Chief Whip of the CDU/CSU Group in the Bundestag
- In office 25 January 2005 – 26 October 2009
- Leader: Angela Merkel; Volker Kauder
- Preceded by: Volker Kauder
- Succeeded by: Peter Altmaier

Member of the Bundestag for Rhein-Sieg-Kreis II
- Incumbent
- Assumed office 10 November 1994
- Preceded by: Franz Möller

Personal details
- Born: Norbert Alois Röttgen; 2 July 1965 (age 61) Meckenheim, West Germany (current-day Germany)
- Party: Christian Democratic Union
- Spouse: Ebba Herfs-Röttgen
- Children: 3
- Education: University of Bonn
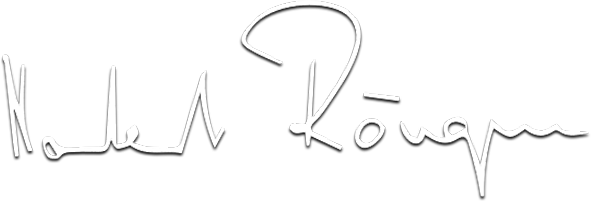
- Signature
- Website: norbert-roettgen.de

Norbert Alois Röttgen (born 2 July 1965) is a German lawyer and politician who served as Federal Minister for the Environment, Nature Conservation and Nuclear Safety in the government of Chancellor Angela Merkel from 2009 to 2012. A member of the Christian Democratic Union (CDU), he placed third in the January 2021 CDU leadership election, then second in the December 2021 leadership election. From 2014 to 2021, he chaired the Bundestag Foreign Affairs Committee.

== Early life and education ==
Röttgen graduated from the Gymnasium of Rheinbach, North Rhine-Westphalia. After completing his Abitur, he started to study law at the University of Bonn in 1984. He passed his first law examination in 1989, his second examination in 1993 and practised as a lawyer in Cologne. He obtained a legal doctorate from the University of Bonn in 2001; his doctoral thesis was on the Court of Justice of the European Union.

== Political career ==
Röttgen joined the CDU in 1982 while he was still a high-school student. From 1992 until 1996, he served as the chair of the Junge Union, the youth organisation of CDU, in the state of North Rhine-Westphalia.

Röttgen was elected to the Bundestag in 1994. From 2002 until 2005 he served as the legal policy spokesman of the CDU/CSU parliamentary group. During the First Merkel cabinet (2005–2009), a grand coalition of the CDU/CSU and SPD, he served as the Chief Parliamentary Secretary of the CDU/CSU parliamentary group in the Bundestag until 2009. In this capacity, he worked closely with the SPD parliamentary floor manager Olaf Scholz to manage and defend the coalition government in parliament. He also served as member of the Parliamentary Oversight Panel (PKGr), which provides parliamentary oversight of Germany's intelligence services—BND, MAD and BfV.

=== Federal Minister for Environment, Nature Conservation and Nuclear Safety, 2009–2011 ===
Following the 2009 federal election, Röttgen was part of the CDU/CSU team in the negotiations with the FDP on a coalition agreement; he joined the working group on economic affairs and energy policy, led by Karl-Theodor zu Guttenberg (CSU) and Rainer Brüderle (FDP).

From 28 October 2009, Röttgen was the Federal Minister for Environment, Nature Conservation and Nuclear Safety in the Second Merkel cabinet. He also served as a member of the Board of Supervisory Directors at KfW from 28 October 2009 to 22 May 2012. From November 2010, he was one of the four deputy chairs of the CDU in Germany. Also, in November 2010 he was formally elected as party chair of the CDU in the state of North Rhine-Westphalia after he had successfully bet Armin Laschet in a membership ballot. At the time, he was often mentioned as a potential successor to Merkel as chancellor.

Röttgen, in his capacity as environment minister, led the German delegations to the 2009 United Nations Climate Change Conference in Copenhagen, the 2010 United Nations Climate Change Conference in Cancún and the 2011 United Nations Climate Change Conference in Durban, respectively.

In May 2011, Röttgen announced his government's plans to shut all of the nation's nuclear power plants by 2022. The decision was based on recommendations of an expert commission appointed after the Fukushima Daiichi nuclear disaster. Later that year, he teamed up with the International Union for Conservation of Nature (IUCN) in launching the Bonn Challenge, calling for 150 million hectares of forest – an area four times larger than Germany – to be reforested by 2020; the Bonn Challenge was later endorsed at the 2014 UN Climate Summit and supplemented by the New York Declaration on Forests, which calls for an end to deforestation by 2030.

=== North Rhine-Westphalia state election and dismissal ===
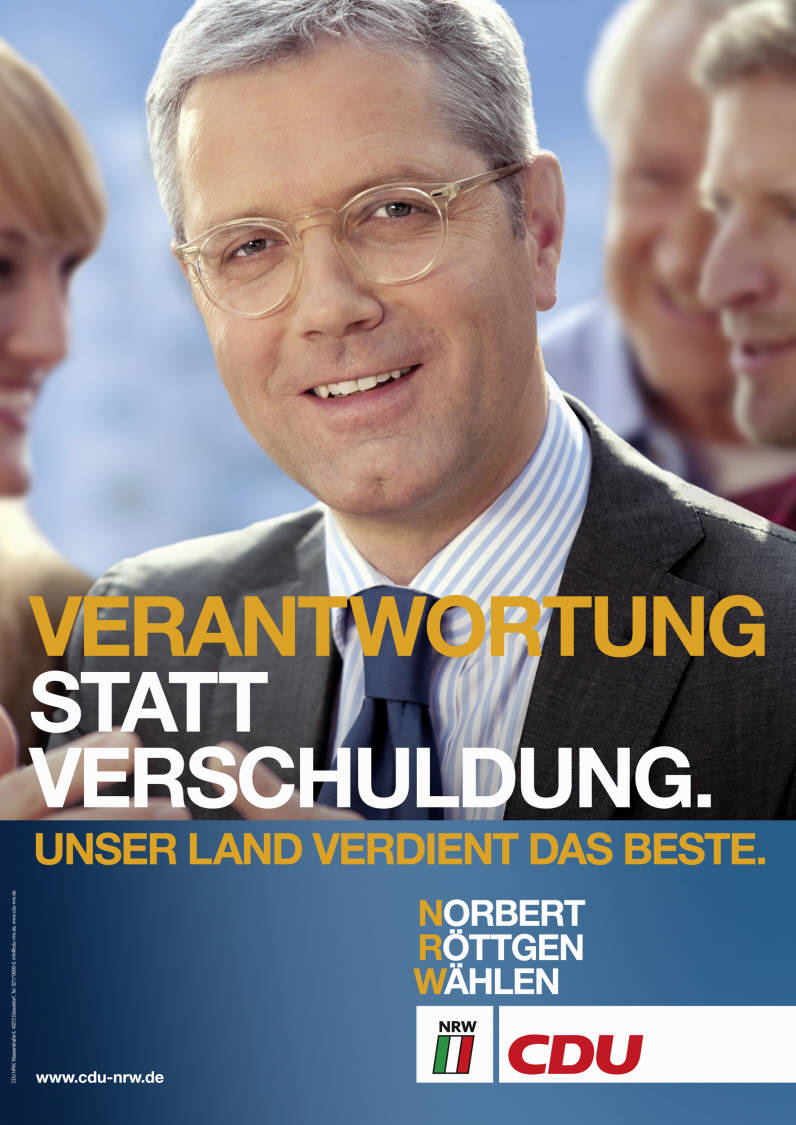
Verantwortung statt Verschuldung (responsibility, not indebtedness); Röttgen on a poster made for the 2012 North Rhine-Westphalia state election

Following the dissolution of the state's Landtag on 14 March 2012, Röttgen confirmed his intention to run in the subsequent election as the CDU's candidate for the office of Minister-President against the incumbent, Hannelore Kraft of the SPD. Röttgen ran against the debt-financed spending supported by Kraft, and even described the vote as a referendum on Merkel's Europe policies. However, he was widely seen as having failed to commit himself whole-heartedly to state politics, refusing to promise that if he lost the election he would nonetheless lead the opposition in North Rhine-Westphalia; 59 percent of respondents to an FG Wahlen poll said his refusal to commit to the state "damaged the CDU."

Following the election defeat of the CDU in North Rhine-Westphalia by a margin almost three times more than was predicted in polls, Röttgen resigned his position as head of the CDU in North Rhine-Westphalia. On 16 May 2012, Chancellor Merkel dismissed him under Article 64 of the German Basic Law as Minister for Environment. Merkel fired Röttgen because she had insisted he would lead the opposition in North Rhine-Westphalia.

The dismissal was seen as unceremonious and highly unusual; ministers are normally given the courtesy of resigning by themselves even after scandals; an example for this was Karl-Theodor zu Guttenberg one year prior. This was the last and overall second time a minister was actively dismissed on a federal level, the other occasion being in 2002, when Chancellor Schröder fired Minister of Defence Rudolf Scharping ahead of the 2002 elections after various scandals. In both cases, the Minister was unwilling to resign on his own. When Röttgen ran for the leadership of the CDU in 2021, some observers speculated he was partly motivated by the dismissal.

Peter Altmaier replaced him, while Armin Laschet took the post of party head in the land.

=== Chairman of the Committee on Foreign Affairs, 2014–2021 ===
From 2014 to 2021, Röttgen was the chairman of the Bundestag's Committee on Foreign Affairs. In addition to his committee assignments, he is a member of the German-Swiss Parliamentary Friendship Group.

In February 2014, Röttgen accompanied German President Joachim Gauck on a state visit to India – where they met with Prime Minister Manmohan Singh and Sonia Gandhi, among others – and Myanmar. Shortly after the referendum on the status of Crimea held on 16 March 2014, he and his counterparts of the Weimar Triangle parliaments – Élisabeth Guigou of France and Grzegorz Schetyna of Poland – visited Kyiv to express their countries' firm support of the territorial integrity and the European integration of Ukraine. This was the first time that parliamentarians of the Weimar Triangle had ever made a joint trip to a third country.

Together with President of the Bundestag Wolfgang Schäuble, Röttgen represented Germany at the funeral of U.S. Senator John McCain in 2018.

In the negotiations to form a coalition government under the leadership of Chancellor Angela Merkel following the 2017 federal elections, Röttgen was part of the working group on foreign policy, led by Ursula von der Leyen, Gerd Müller and Sigmar Gabriel.

In 2020, following the resignation of CDU chairwoman Annegret Kramp-Karrenbauer, Röttgen announced his candidacy for the party leadership; this made him the first official contender in the election. After losing the election to Armin Laschet in January 2021, Röttgen announced his candidacy for the Christian Democratic Union leadership a second time on 12 November 2021. His opponents were Helge Braun and Friedrich Merz. Röttgen finished second in the race after Friedrich Merz, who would win the first round of an online membership ballot by 62.1%.

=== Deputy Chair of the CDU/CSU Group, 2025–present ===
Since 2025, Röttgen has again been serving as deputy chair of the CDU/CSU parliamentary group, this time under the leadership of chairman Jens Spahn. In this capacity, he oversees the group's legislative activity on foreign policy, defence, human rights and the Council of Europe.

== Political views ==
=== European integration ===
In 2011, Röttgen called for the direct elections of the President of the European Commission, a bicameral political system for the EU, and simultaneous parliamentary elections across the EU.

Following the 2016 referendum on European Union membership in the United Kingdom, Röttgen co-authored a paper with Jean Pisani-Ferry, André Sapir, Paul Tucker and Guntram Wolff which lays out a proposal of a "continental partnership" between the EU and the UK. According to the paper, such a partnership would grant Britain some control over labor mobility while preserving free movement of capital, goods and services.

=== Relations with Russia ===
Röttgen is considered as an advocate of a more assertive German foreign policy. In an editorial for the Financial Times in March 2014, he argued that the only people who seemed not to realize that Germany was at the center of the Crimean crisis were "the Germans themselves." When Russian state-run energy group Gazprom conducted an asset swap with its long-term German partner BASF, under which it increased its stake in Wingas, Röttgen raised concerns about the deal. In his opinion, expanding Gazprom activities in Germany are "deepening our dependence on Russia." In late 2015, Röttgen called for a review of the Nord Stream 2 natural gas pipeline, saying it was a "highly-political subject which carried the risk of splitting Europe" and may "contradict the aims of the agreed European energy policy."

Röttgen supported the European Union leaders' decision to impose sanctions on 21 individuals after the referendum in Crimea that paved the way for Putin to annex the region from Ukraine. By August 2014, he demanded that Europe respond to the escalation of violence in Ukraine by agreeing to further sanctions against Russia, saying that "[a]ny hesitation would be seen by [Russian President Vladimir] Putin as European weakness that would encourage him to keep going." However, he ruled out a U.S. proposal to arm Ukraine against Russia, calling it a "grave mistake" which "not only would [give] Putin a pretext to expand the war beyond eastern Ukraine, it would also serve his other goal to divide the West wherever he can."

=== Relations with the Middle East ===
Amid the debate on sending military assistance to the Iraqi government following a dramatic push by Islamic State militants through northern Iraq in mid-2014, Röttgen told newspaper Die Welt that delivering weapons would violate the government's arms export guidelines.

In 2016, Röttgen was quoted by Der Spiegel as saying that Germany might end its unconditional support for Israel due to increasing frustration with Prime Minister Benjamin Netanyahu's policies. "Israel's current policies are not contributing to the country remaining Jewish and democratic," Röttgen was quoted as saying. "We must express this concern more clearly to Israel."

In 2019, Röttgen warned that Germany would alienate its European partners if it continued to insist on maintaining a temporary moratorium on arms deliveries to Saudi Arabia.

=== Relations with Iran ===
In March 2014, Röttgen was part of a delegation of the European Council of Foreign Relations to Tehran, Iran. In an open letter published in prominent newspapers across Europe – including El Mundo, Corriere della Sera, Svenska Dagbladet, Tagesspiegel, and The Guardian – on 5 November 2014, he joined Javier Solana, Ana Palacio, Carl Bildt, Emma Bonino, Jean-Marie Guéhenno and Robert Cooper in urging the EU3+3 countries (the UK, Germany and France and the US, China and Russia) and Iran to reach agreement on a comprehensive nuclear deal, arguing "that there may never again be an opportunity as good as this one to seal a final nuclear deal."

=== Relations with Turkey ===
In a speech to parliament in April 2015, Röttgen urged his fellow parliamentarians to call the killing of hundreds of thousands of Armenians under Turkish rule in 1915 genocidal and to acknowledge that German actions at the time were partly to blame, adding that this recognition was overdue.

=== Climate change and the environment ===
Following the 2009 United Nations Climate Change Conference, Röttgen sharply criticized both U.S. President Barack Obama and China's leadership when he said: "China doesn't want to lead, and the U.S. cannot lead." Writing in the Financial Times in 2010, he joined British Energy Minister Chris Huhne and French Ecology Minister Jean-Louis Borloo in urging the European Union to slash greenhouse gas emissions by 30 percent from the originally established 20 percent target by 2020.

Both Angela Merkel and Röttgen, the chief architects of the government's energy transition plan, are thought to have pushed for a rapid nuclear phase-out with a view to raising the prospects for a possible future national coalition with the Green Party. In 2012, Roettgen's plan to cut subsidies for solar power drew fire from opposition parties and the photovoltaic industry, which said the move threatened thousands of jobs in what was then the world's biggest solar market by installed capacity.

=== Relations with the African continent ===
Röttgen has in the past voted in favor of German participation in United Nations peacekeeping missions as well as in United Nations-mandated European Union peacekeeping missions on the African continent, such as in Somalia – both Operation Atalanta and EUTM Somalia – (2011, 2012, 2013, 2014 and 2015), Darfur/Sudan (2010, 2011, 2012, 2013 and 2014), South Sudan (2011, 2012, 2013 and 2014), Mali (2013 and 2014), the Central African Republic (2014) and Liberia (2015). He abstained from the votes on extending the mandates for Operation Atalanta in 2009 and 2010 as well as on EUTM Somalia in 2016.

=== Relations with China ===
After European ambassadors wrote an open letter, praising 45 years of Sino-European relations, they found that China Daily, which is a state-controlled media outlet, refused to publish unless it was significantly changed (in particular, that references to the origins of Coronavirus disease 2019 in China be removed). The Europeans obediently capitulated to this request. As the head of the German parliament's foreign affairs committee, Röttgen criticised the European back-pedalling:

I am shocked not once but twice: First the EU ambassadors generously adopt Chinese narratives and then on top of that the EU representation accepts Chinese censorship of the joint op-ed. Speaking with one voice is important, but it has to reflect our shared European values and interests.

In a joint letter initiated by Röttgen and Anthony Gonzalez ahead of the 47th G7 summit in 2021, some 70 legislators from Europe and the US called upon their leaders to take a tough stance on China and to "avoid becoming dependent" on the country for technology including artificial intelligence and 5G.

== Other activities ==
=== Corporate boards ===
- KfW, Ex-Officio Member of the Board of Supervisory Directors (2009–2012)

=== Non-profit organisations ===
- Club of Three, President of the Steering Group (since 2019)
- Atlantik-Brücke, Deputy chairman of the board (since 2019)
- European Council on Foreign Relations (ECFR), Co-chair (since 2019)
- Development and Peace Foundation (SEF), Member of the Board of Trustees (since 2019)
- Hertie School of Governance, Member of the Board of Trustees (since 2008)
- Asia House, Member of the Advisory Board
- German Institute of Global and Area Studies (GIGA), Member of the Board of Trustees
- Humanity in Action Germany, Member of the Advisory Board
- CARE Deutschland-Luxemburg, Member of the Board of Trustees
- Dahrendorf Forum, Member of the Committee
- German Industry Initiative for Energy Efficiency (DENEFF), Member of the Board of Trustees
- Jacques Delors Institute Berlin, chairman of the Advisory Board
- Konrad Adenauer Foundation, Member
- Max Planck Institute for the Study of Societies, Member of the Board of Trustees
- Stiftung Neue Verantwortung, Member of the Board of Trustees
- Turkey: Culture of Change Initiative (TCCI), Member of the Advisory Board
- Villa Vigoni Association, Non-permanent Member of the Board of Trustees
- Federal Agency for Civic Education, Member of the Board of Trustees (1998–2005)
- Haus der Geschichte, Member of the Board of Trustees (2002–2005)

== Personal life ==
Röttgen is married to Ebba Herfs-Röttgen, a lawyer. The couple have three children. In his childhood, Röttgen played the accordion.

== Publications ==
- 1. Was bedeutet Fortschritt heute? Röttgen, Norbert. – Berlin : BMU, Referat Öffentlichkeitsarbeit, 2010, Stand: Februar 2010, 1. Aufl. (in German)
- 2. Bürokratiekostenabbau in Deutschland. Baden-Baden : Nomos, 2010, 1. Aufl. (in German)
- 3. Deutschlands beste Jahre kommen noch. Röttgen, Norbert. – München : Piper, 2009 (in German)
- 4. Wir haben viel erreicht. Berlin : CDU/CSU-Fraktion im Dt. Bundestag, 2008 (in German)
- 5. Parlamentarische Kontrolle der Nachrichtendienste im demokratischen. Rechtsstaat. Sankt Augustin : Konrad-Adenauer-Stiftung, 2008 (in German)
- 6. Wirtschaft trifft Politik / 2007. Deutschland und Europa im Prozess der Globalisierung. 2008 (in German)
- 7. Gut, dass die Union regiert. Berlin : CDU/CSU Fraktion im deutschen Bundestag, 2007, Stand: September 2007 (in German)
- 8. Was wir erreicht haben. Berlin : CDU/CSU-Fraktion im Dt. Bundestag, 2006 (in German)
- 9. Die Argumentation des Europäischen Gerichtshofes. Röttgen, Norbert, 2001 (in German)
