= Freedom and Security: Principles for Germany =

2007 CDU party platform

Freedom and Security: Principles for Germany (German: Freiheit und Sicherheit. Grundsätze für Deutschland) is the third party platform of the Christian Democratic Union of Germany (CDU). It was adopted in December 2007.

== Background ==
In early December 2004, at the 18th federal party congress of the Christian Democratic Union of Germany (CDU), Angela Merkel, then-party leader and future chancellor of Germany, announced the creation of a brand new party platform. Eighteen groups were formed to create the content of the party platform.

The party platform was formally adopted at the 21st party congress from 3–4 December 2007 in Hanover.

== Contents ==
The party platform is divided into several sections according to the preamble:

- We Christian Democrats
- Challenges of our Time – CDU's Prospects for shaping the Future
- Strong Families – humane Society
- Germany as a Nation of Education and Culture – Answers for the Knowledge-based Society
- Renewal of the Social Market Economy in the Globalised World
- Preserving God's Creation and Life – Environment worth living in
- Active Citizens, a strong State, an open-minded Country
- Acknowledgement of Germany's Responsibilities and Interests

== Documents ==
Several documents have been published about the party platform. These include the full version and a summary.

== Analysis ==
The Federal Agency for Civic Education has published an article on the CDU's platform, outlining its key points. It includes the party's commitment to assuming governmental responsibility and a strong profile in economic and financial policy, as well as domestic and legal policy. Various measures are listed for both areas. In social issues, the platform marked the beginning of a shift towards the centre of the political spectrum.
