= Helge Braun =

German politician (born 1972)

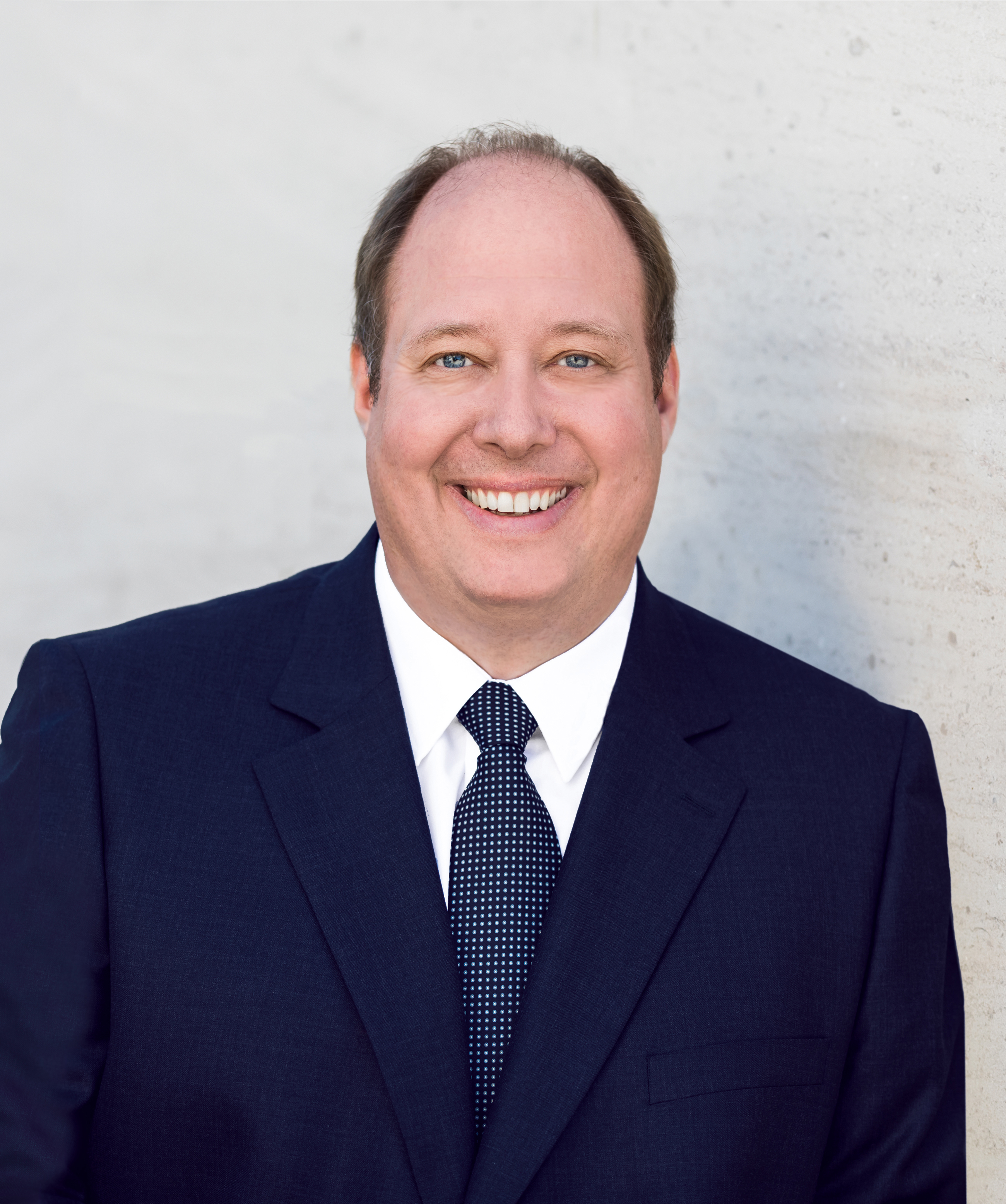
- Braun in 2017

Chair of the Budget Committee
- In office 15 December 2021 – 25 March 2025
- Deputy: Bettina Hagedorn
- Preceded by: Peter Boehringer
- Succeeded by: Lisa Paus

Head of the Chancellery Minister for Special Affairs
- In office 14 March 2018 – 8 December 2021
- Chancellor: Angela Merkel
- Preceded by: Peter Altmaier
- Succeeded by: Wolfgang Schmidt

State Minister to the Chancellor for Bureaucracy reduction, better regulation and Federal-State Relations
- In office 17 December 2013 – 14 March 2018
- Chancellor: Angela Merkel
- Preceded by: Eckart von Klaeden
- Succeeded by: Hendrik Hoppenstedt

Parliamentary State Secretary in the Ministry of Education and Research
- In office 28 October 2009 – 17 December 2013
- Minister: Annette Schavan; Johanna Wanka
- Preceded by: Andreas Storm
- Succeeded by: Stefan Müller

Member of the Bundestag; from Hesse
- In office 17 October 2002 – 25 March 2025
- Constituency: State list (2002–2009); Gießen (2009–2021); State list (2021–2025)

Personal details
- Born: Helge Reinhold Braun; 18 October 1972 (age 54) Giessen, West Germany
- Party: Christian Democratic Union
- Education: University of Giessen
- Occupation: Politician; physician
- Website: helge-braun.de

Helge Reinhold Braun (born 18 October 1972) is a German physician and politician of the Christian Democratic Union (CDU) who has been serving as president of the University of Lübeck since 2024.

Between 2018 and 2021, Braun served as Head of the Chancellery and Federal Minister for Special Affairs in the fourth coalition government of Chancellor Angela Merkel. He was the Parliamentary Secretary of State for Bureaucracy Reduction and Federal-State Relations at the Chancellery between 2013 and 2018.

Braun, who was thought of as a party insider, loyal to moderate Merkel, ran in the December 2021 CDU leadership election, but only came in a distant third.

== Early life and education ==
After passing the Abitur in 1992 at the Liebigschule in Giessen, Braun studied medicine at the Justus-Liebig University in Giessen. From 2001 until 2009, he was a scientific assistant at the Clinic for Anaesthesiology, Intensive Care and Analgesic Therapy of the University Hospital of Giessen and Marburg. He speaks German and some English.

== Political career ==
From 1989 until 2007 Braun was a member of the Young Union (JU). He was the district leader of the JU Giessen from 1992 till 1997 and from 1998 until 2001 he was the regional leader of the JU Mittelhessen.

He has been a member of the Christian Democratic Union since 1990.

=== Member of Parliament ===
Braun first served as a member of the Bundestag from October 2002 to September 2005. From 2003 until 2005 he was the deputy leader of the Hessian Members of the Bundestag. He also served on the Committee on Education and Research, the Committee on Environment, Nuclear Safety and Nature Conservation and on the Parliamentary Advisory Board for Sustainable Development.

Braun lost his seat in the 2005 federal elections. He was able to re-enter the Bundestag in 2009, winning the constituency of his home town of Gießen with a majority of 59,441 votes or 36.7%. After the election, he was again elected as deputy leader of the Hessian MPs. In the subsequent federal elections of 2013 and 2017 he was able to defend his seat.

In Merkel's second coalition government, Braun was Parliamentary Secretary of State for Education and Research, serving alongside Thomas Rachel under successive ministers Annette Schavan (2009–2013) and Johanna Wanka (2013). During his time in office, he notably stepped up Germany's activities on research into neglected tropical diseases.

In the negotiations to form a Grand Coalition of Christian Democrats (CDU together with the Bavarian CSU) and the Social Democrats following the 2013 federal elections, Braun was part of the CDU/CSU delegation in the working group on education and research policy, led by Johanna Wanka and Doris Ahnen. Merkel subsequently appointed him as Parliamentary Secretary of State for Bureaucracy Reduction and Federal-State Relations, serving directly under her in the Federal Chancellery. In that capacity, he was one of the officials co-ordinating Germany's response to the European migrant crisis in 2015.

After the 2017 elections and the successful coalition talks between the CDU/CSU and SPD in February 2018, Braun became the designated Head of the Chancellery and Federal Minister of Special Affairs in the fourth Merkel government. On 14 March 2018, he succeeded Peter Altmaier.

For the 2021 elections, Braun was elected to lead the CDU campaign in Hesse. He lost his constituency to the Social Democratic Party but was re-elected on the state list.

On 12 November 2021, Braun announced his candidacy for the Christian Democratic Union leadership, joining opponents Norbert Röttgen and Friedrich Merz in the race to succeed Armin Laschet; the position ultimately went to Merz.

From late 2021 to 2025, Braun chaired the Budget Committee. In this capacity, he also served as his parliamentary group’s rapporteur on the annual budget of the Federal Ministry of Health. In 2022, he also joined the Subcommittee on Global Health.

In November 2024, Braun announced that he would not stand in the 2025 federal elections but instead resign from active politics by the end of the parliamentary term.

In January 2025, Braun was one of 12 CDU lawmakers who opted not to back a draft law on tightening immigration policy sponsored by their own leader Friedrich Merz, who had pushed for the law despite warnings from party colleagues that he risked being tarnished with the charge of voting alongside the far-right Alternative for Germany.

== Post-political career ==
In November 2024, Braun was appointed as president of the University of Lübeck. In 2025, he chaired the search committee that selected Jan-Werner Müller as new president of the Hertie School; however, Müller later rejected the offer.

== Other activities ==
=== Government agencies ===
- German Foundation for International Legal Cooperation (IRZ), Member of the Board of Trustees (since 2022)

=== Non-profit organizations ===
- Alfried Krupp von Bohlen und Halbach Foundation, Member of the Board of Trustees (since 2025)
- Hertie School, Chair of the Board of Trustees (since 2024)
- Lions Foundation Germany, Member of the Board of Trustees (since 2024)
- Uniting to Combat Neglected Tropical Diseases (NTDs), Member of the Board (since 2022)
- Loewe Center for Novel Drug Targets against Poverty-Related and Neglected Tropical Infectious Diseases (DRUID), Member of the Advisory Board
- Friends of the University of Giessen, Member of the Governing Board
- German Network against Antimicrobial Resistance (DNAMR), Member of the Parliamentary Advisory Board (2024–2025)
- German Network against Neglected Tropical Diseases (DNTDs), Member of the Parliamentary Advisory Board (2022–2025)
- Sepsis-Stiftung, Member of the Board of Trustees
- German Institute for International and Security Affairs (SWP), Vice Chairman of the council (2018–2021)
- Max Delbrück Center for Molecular Medicine (MDC), Helmholtz Association of German Research Centres, Member of the Board of Trustees (2009–2013)
- German Foundation for Peace Research (DSF), Ex-Officio Deputy Chairman of the Board of Trustees (2009–2013)
- Stiftung Lesen, Member of the Board of Trustees (2009–2013)

== Recognition ==
- 2015: Global Sepsis Award

== Personal life ==
Braun is a Roman Catholic and is married.

In April 2023, Braun was one of the 22 guests at the ceremony in which Angela Merkel was decorated with the Grand Cross of the Order of Merit for special achievement by President Frank-Walter Steinmeier at Schloss Bellevue in Berlin.

Political offices
Preceded by Peter Altmaier	Chancellery Chief of Staff; 2018–2021	Succeeded by Wolfgang Schmidt
Preceded by Peter Altmaier	Minister for Special Affairs; 2018–2021	Succeeded by Wolfgang Schmidt
