= December 2021 Christian Democratic Union of Germany leadership election =

Third leadership election of the CDU

December 2021 Christian Democratic Union leadership election
← 2021 (Jan)	4–16 December 2021

1,001 delegates in the 34rd CDU Federal Congress 501 delegate votes needed to win
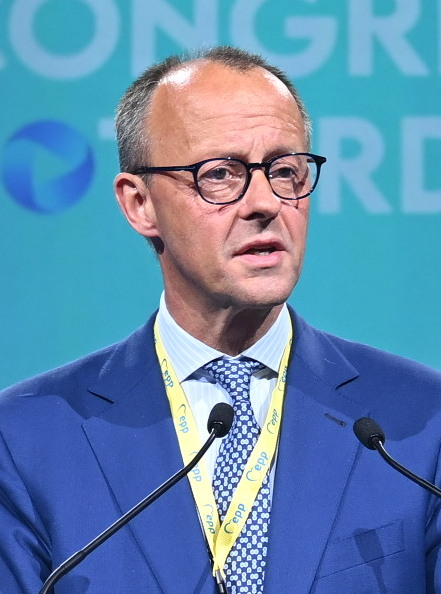

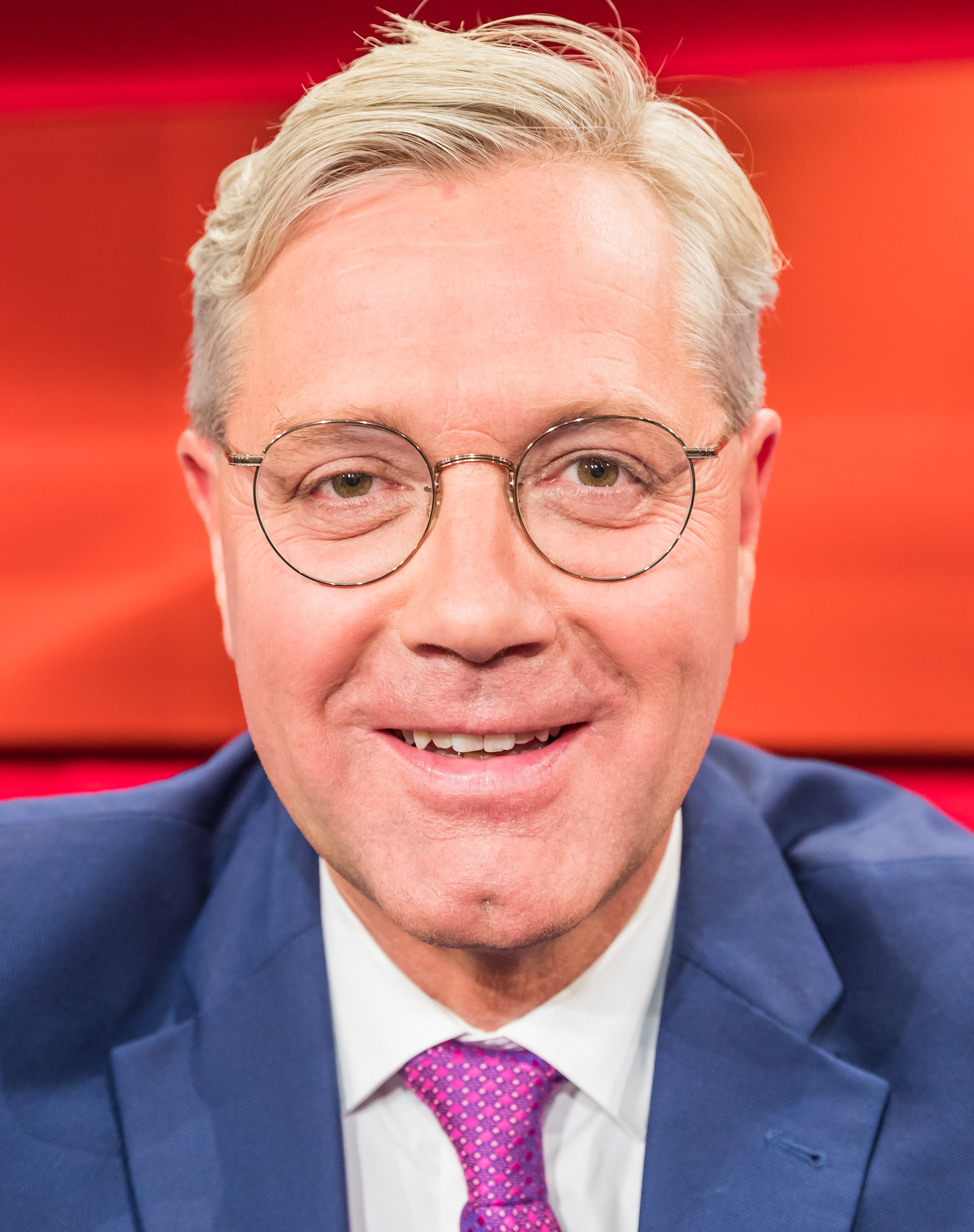

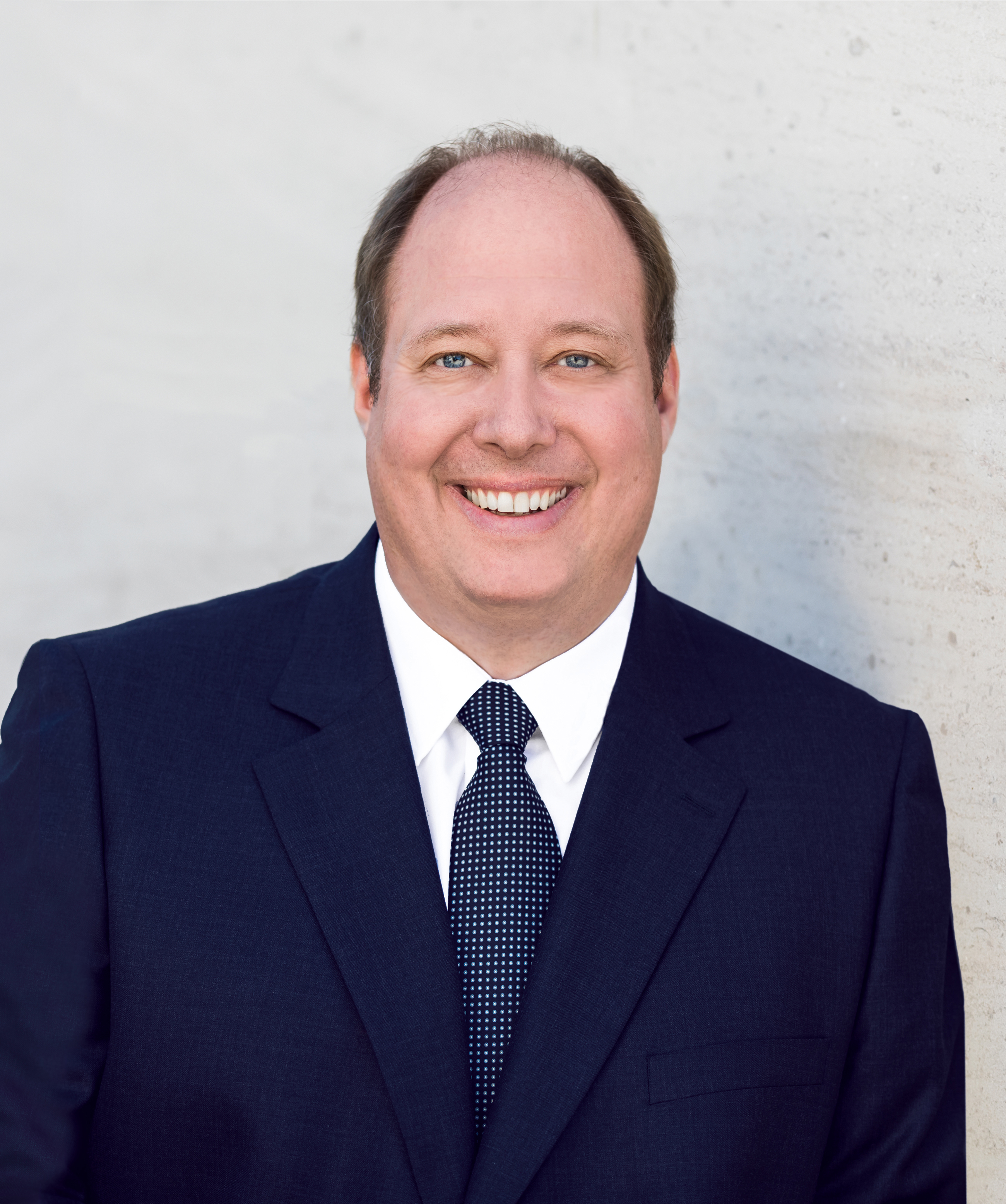
Candidate	Friedrich Merz	Norbert Röttgen	Helge Braun
Popular vote	158,328	65,779	30,850
Percentage	62.1%	25.8%	12.1%
Leader before election
Armin Laschet
Elected Leader
Friedrich Merz

The December 2021 Christian Democratic Union leadership election was held in December 2021. The leader of the party was elected indirectly by a party convention, for the first time the CDU held a vote by the membership to decide the candidate which the party's executive board proposed to the party convention. Though the convention is not obliged to elect the proposed candidates, the membership vote is considered politically binding. The online vote of members was from 4 December to 16 December 2021 and the convention in Hanover on 21 and 22 January 2022 formalised the election.

The election was triggered by the resignation of leader Armin Laschet in October 2021. Laschet was elected in January 2021 after the resignation of Annegret Kramp-Karrenbauer. His resignation was triggered by the loss of the 2021 German federal election.

Three candidates ran, being former Leader of the CDU/CSU in the Bundestag Friedrich Merz, former Minister for the Environment Norbert Röttgen and Head of the Chancellery Helge Braun. Braun was seen as the establishment candidate, being a longtime associate of Merkel. Röttgen, who was fired as Minister by Merkel in 2012, did not have the establishment backing, but ran on a liberal platform and appealing to young voters via social media. Merz was the conservative outsider, being shunned by Merkel for the chairmanship of the CDU/CSU in the Bundestag.

Party members overwhelmingly choose conservative outsider Friedrich Merz in December 2021 with 62.1%, avoiding a runoff election, after he had failed in the previous two leadership elections, to Annegret Kramp-Karrenbauer in 2018 and Laschet in January 2021. This was seen as a rebuttal to the party establishment, that had backed Kramp-Karrenbauer and Laschet, both seen as being more moderate, aligned in both policy positions and leadership style to Angela Merkel.

== Candidates ==
Portrait	Name	Offices held	State	Announcement date
	Friedrich Merz (born 1955)	Leader of CDU/CSU Group in the Bundestag and Leader of the Opposition (2000–2002) Member of the Bundestag (1994–2009, 2021–present) Member of the European Parliament (1989–1994)	North Rhine-Westphalia	15 November 2021
	Norbert Röttgen (born 1965)	Chair of the Bundestag Foreign Affairs Committee (2014–present) Member of the Bundestag (1994–present) Federal Minister for the Environment, Nature Conservation and Nuclear Safety (2009–2012) Deputy Leader of the Christian Democratic Union (2010–2012) Leader of the Christian Democratic Union in North Rhine-Westphalia (2010–2012)	North Rhine-Westphalia	12 November 2021
	Helge Braun (born 1972)	Federal Minister for Special Affairs of Germany and Head of the Chancellery (2018–2021) Member of the Bundestag (2009–present) Minister of State for Bureaucracy Reduction and Federal-State Relations (2009–2013) Parliamentary Secretary of State for Education and Research (2009–2013)	Hesse	12 November 2021

== Endorsements ==
Helge Braun

Organizations and platforms

- CDU Gießen
- CDU Vogelsberg
- "Weiße Ritter"

Individuals

- Volker Bouffier, Minister-President of Hesse and deputy leader of the CDU
- Michael Meister, State Secretary in the Federal Ministry of Education and Research
- Nadine Schön, deputy leader of the CDU/CSU faction
- Serap Güler, Member of the Bundestag and State Secretary for Integration in North Rhine-Westphalia
Friedrich Merz

Organizations and platforms

- Parliamentary Circle Mittelstand
- Mittelstands- und Wirtschaftsunion
- Werteunion
- CDU Hochsauerlandkreis,
- CDU Mittelsachsen
- CDU Sömmerda
- CDU Marburg-Biedenkopf
- CDU Wildeshausen
- CDU Düsseldorf

Individuals

- Reiner Haseloff, Minister-President of Saxony-Anhalt
- Mario Voigt, CDU parliamentary group leader Thuringia
- Christian Hirte, chairman of the CDU Thuringia
- Sven Schulze, chairman of the CDU Saxony-Anhalt
- Michael Kretschmer, Minister-President of Saxony and State Chairman of the CDU Saxony
- Alexander Dierks, General Secretary of the CDU Saxony
- Tilman Kuban, chairman of the Junge Union
- Jan Redmann, leader of the CDU faction in Brandenburg
- Carsten Linnemann, chairman of the Mittelstands- und Wirtschaftsunion
- Astrid Hamker, president of the Economic Council Germany
- Franca Bauernfeind, chairman of the Association of Christian Democratic Students
- Wolfgang Bosbach, former deputy leader of the CDU/CSU faction
- Sylvia Pantel, chairwoman of the Berliner Kreis in der Union
- Sabine Buder, candidate for leadership but did not receive an endorsement by a subdivision.
- Martin Herrenknecht, Wolfgang Grupp, Christian Sewing and Joachim Rudolf, businessmen
Norbert Röttgen

Organizations and platforms

- CDU Rhein-Sieg
- CDU Grafschaft Bentheim
- CDU Herzogtum-Lauenburg
- CDU Bochum
- CDU Darmstadt
- JU Frankfurt (Oder)
- Union der Mitte

Individuals

- Franziska Hoppermann, Member of the Bundestag and proposed Secretary General
- Annette Widmann-Mauz, Chairwoman of the Frauen-Union
- Markus Söder, Prime Minister of Bavaria and CSU Chairman
- Reinhold Hilbers, Minister of Finance of Lower Saxony
- Kai Whittaker, Member of the Bundestag,
- Albert Stegemann, Member of the Bundestag
- Elisabeth Motschmann, Member of the Bundestag
- Matthias Hauer, Member of the Bundestag

== Polls among CDU voters ==
Fieldwork date	Pollster	Sample size	Braun	Röttgen	Merz	Linnemann	Spahn	Brinkhaus	Undecided/ Don't know
23–24 Nov 2021	Infratest Dimap	1,239	14 %	20 %	48 %	-	-	-	18 %
10–16 Nov 2021	Kantar	1,433	9 %	26 %	45 %	-	-	-	20 %
4–5 Nov 2021	Forsa	1,004	-	19 %	27 %	5 %	12 %	13 %	24 %
2–3 Nov 2021	Civey	5,012	-	24 %	37 %	12 %	2 %	8 %	17 %
28–29 Nov 2021	Forsa	1,000	-	24 %	29 %	9 %	7 %	8 %	23 %
26–27 Oct 2021	Infratest Dimap	1,239	-	25 %	36 %	9 %	14 %	6 %	10 %

== Results ==
Candidate	Votes	%
Friedrich Merz	158,328	62.1
Norbert Röttgen	65,779	25.8
Helge Braun	30,850	12.1
Total valid votes	254,957	100.0
Turnout	c. 386,000	66.02
Source: CDU

First Round
Merz	62.1%
Röttgen	25.8%
Helge Braun	12.1%
