= 2021 Christian Democratic Union of Germany leadership election =

2021 Christian Democratic Union of Germany leadership election may refer to:

- January 2021 Christian Democratic Union of Germany leadership election
- December 2021 Christian Democratic Union of Germany leadership election
