= January 2021 Christian Democratic Union of Germany leadership election =

Election in Germany

January 2021 Christian Democratic Union leadership election
- 15–16 January 2021

1,001 delegates in the 33rd CDU Federal Congress 501 delegate votes needed to win
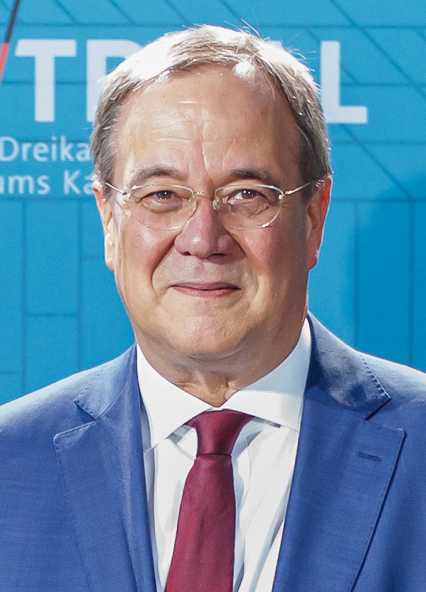

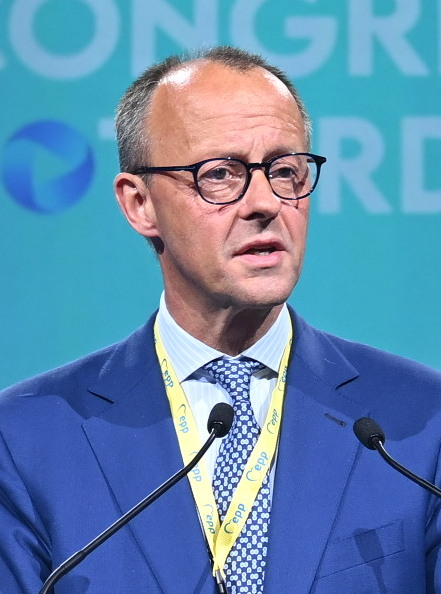

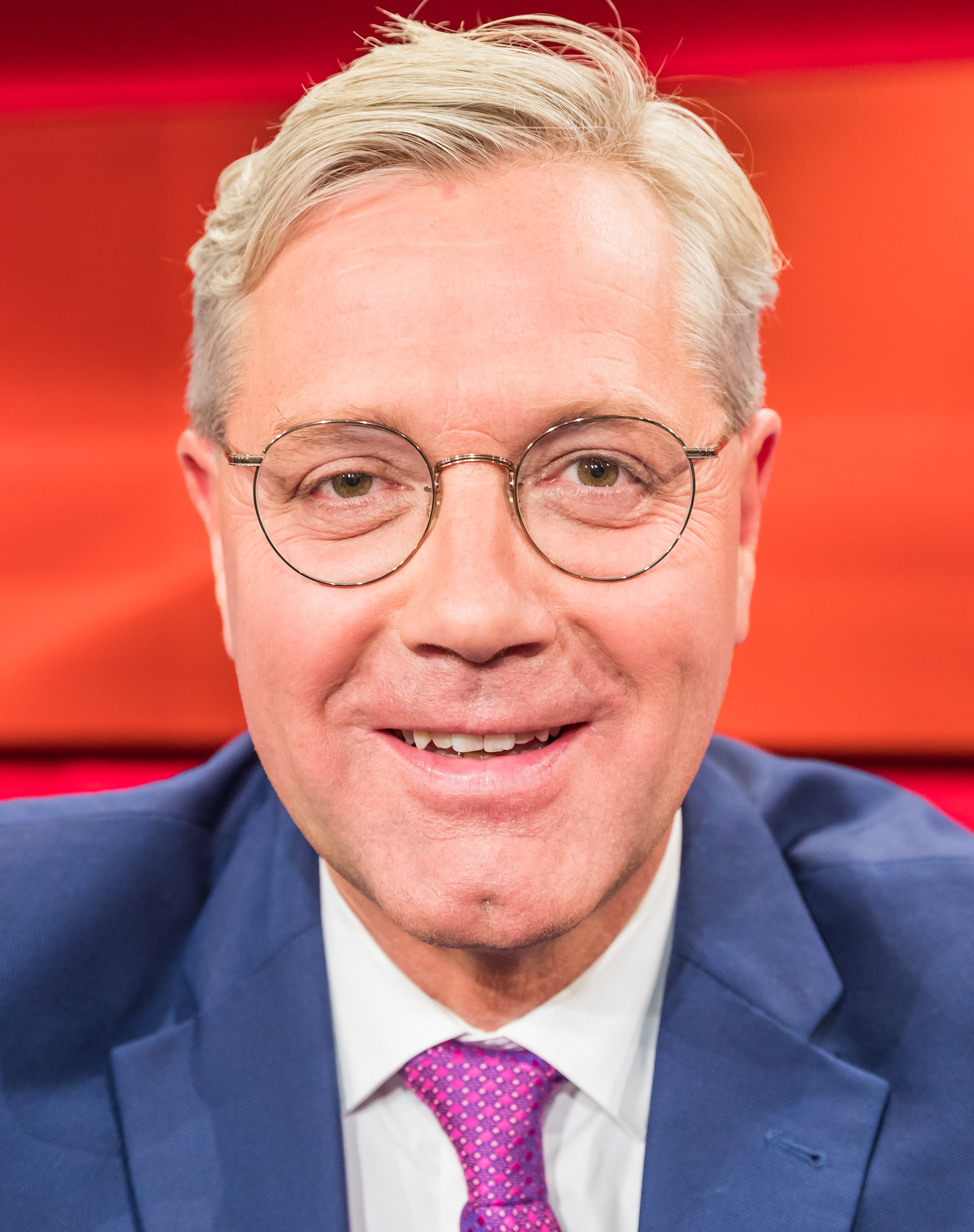
Candidate	Armin Laschet	Friedrich Merz	Norbert Röttgen
First round	380, 38.42%	385, 38.93%	224, 22.65%
Runoff	521, 52.79%	466, 47.21%	Eliminated
Leader before election
Annegret Kramp-Karrenbauer
Elected Leader
Armin Laschet

The January 2021 Christian Democratic Union leadership election took place on 15 January 2021 at the party's 33rd Congress to elect the leader of the Christian Democratic Union of Germany.

The election was triggered by the resignation of leader Annegret Kramp-Karrenbauer in February 2020. Kramp-Karrenbauer was elected in November 2018 and, while initially popular, suffered a series of difficulties beginning shortly before the 2019 European elections. Her resignation was triggered by her failure to enforce discipline in the CDU's Thuringia branch during the 2020 Thuringian government crisis. The election to replace her was originally scheduled to take place on 25 April 2020 in Berlin, but was postponed due to the COVID-19 pandemic. On 14 September 2020, Secretary-General Paul Ziemiak announced that the Congress would, due to the pandemic, be held as a one-day meeting on 4 December 2020. However, in late October, the election was further postponed due to a surge in COVID cases nationally. A virtual Congress was held on 15–16 January, with the election of the new leader held on 16 January. The victor was formally confirmed in a postal vote on 22 January.

Three candidates stood in the election. Norbert Röttgen, chair of the Bundestag foreign affairs committee, announced his candidacy on 18 February. This was followed on 25 February by a joint announcement from Minister-President of North Rhine-Westphalia Armin Laschet, who declared his intention to stand for the leadership, with the endorsement of federal Health Minister Jens Spahn. A few hours later, former leader of the CDU/CSU Bundestag group Friedrich Merz announced his own candidacy.

Merz won a plurality of votes in the first round of the election, securing 385 (39%) to Laschet's 380 (38%). Röttgen placed third with 224 (23%). Laschet was elected in the runoff, winning 521 (52.8%) of delegate votes, while Merz won 466 (47.2%). Laschet was formally confirmed by a postal vote on 22 January, winning 83.4% of votes.

== Candidates ==
=== Declared ===
Portrait	Name	Offices held	State	Announcement date
	Armin Laschet (born 1961)	Minister-President of North Rhine-Westphalia (2017–present); Deputy Leader of the Christian Democratic Union (2012–present); Leader of the Christian Democratic Union in North Rhine-Westphalia (2012–present)	North Rhine-Westphalia	25 February 2020
	Friedrich Merz (born 1955)	Leader of CDU/CSU Group in the Bundestag and Leader of the Opposition (2000–2002); Member of the Bundestag (1994–2009); Member of the European Parliament (1989–1994)	North Rhine-Westphalia	25 February 2020
	Norbert Röttgen (born 1965)	Chair of the Bundestag Foreign Affairs Committee (2014–present); Member of the Bundestag (1994–present); Federal Minister for the Environment, Nature Conservation and Nuclear Safety (2009–2012); Deputy Leader of the Christian Democratic Union (2010–2012); Leader of the Christian Democratic Union in North Rhine-Westphalia (2010–2012)	North Rhine-Westphalia	18 February 2020

=== Armin Laschet ===
The premier of the populous state of North Rhine-Westphalia since 2017, Armin Laschet chose Jens Spahn, minister of health and candidate in the previous CDU leadership election, as his deputy. Characterizing his campaign as a bridge between the centrist and right-wing factions, Laschet sees his leadership with Spahn as able to solve the crisis in the CDU, which has been rocked by the fallout from regional CDU lawmakers voting with the far-right to elect the premier of the eastern state of Thuringia and which suffered one of its worst-ever electoral results in Hamburg.

A CDU member since 1979, Laschet has held a variety of positions in local, state, federal and European politics, including stints as an MEP and regional minister overseeing the integration of immigrants. Seen as a moderate who is close to Angela Merkel's vision of the CDU, Laschet is a devout Catholic who opposed same-sex marriage and has advocated banning headscarves for girls up to age 14. Despite those views, Laschet tapped Spahn, a married gay man, to be his deputy and is seen as a champion of migrant rights. Laschet is widely considered to be good-natured and adept at building consensus while critics say he is too much like Merkel and not conservative enough to win back voters the CDU lost to the far-right. Some also accused him of having dangerous views in foreign affairs, describing him as being overly friendly towards Russia and China.

=== Friedrich Merz ===
Friedrich Merz is a returning rival of Merkel hoping to bring voters lost by Merkel's centrism back to the CDU. After losing leadership of the party in the early 2000s, Merz lost his position as leader of the CDU/CSU Group in the Bundestag and left the Bundestag in 2009 for a career in the private sector. Since his first political retirement, Merz has worked for insurer Axa, chemical giant BASF and investment group BlackRock. When Merkel announced her resignation from the CDU leadership, Merz announced he would challenge Annegret Kramp-Karrenbauer, Merkel's preferred successor, for the position as leader in 2017. He was unsuccessful in winning leadership in 2018, narrowly placing second behind Kramp-Karrenbauer with 18 delegate votes less.

A law and order, free-market conservative, Merz promises to win back disgruntled CDU voters who have defected to the far-right Alternative for Germany. Both allies and rivals attest to Merz's sharp mind and detailed knowledge of complicated policy issues. However, critics say that he is too right-wing for the party, having opposed a 1997 reform to criminalize rape within marriage and advocating the so-called Leitkultur, which is the promotion of German culture, mores and traditions among immigrants.

Merz was supported by Hungary's ruling Fidesz party.

=== Norbert Röttgen ===
The chair of the Bundestag's foreign affairs committee and served as federal environment minister between 2009 and 2012, Norbert Röttgen joined the CDU in high school and built a career in the party, becoming a member of parliament in 1994. Röttgen fell out of favour with Merkel in 2012 after choosing to run for the premiership in North Rhine-Westphalia and achieving one of the worst results in his party's history. He was sacked from cabinet days after the result.

A centrist, Röttgen is well-liked by older, establishment CDU insiders. He advocates the core values of the old German republic, namely transatlanticism, the Franco–German partnership and a strong anchoring of Germany in the European Union. Seen as solidly grounded in all the major political issues of the day, critics have pointed to his loss in North Rhine-Westphalia and that he "lacks the common touch" to steer the party in the current state of German politics.

Over the course of the leadership election, support among CDU MPs rose for Röttgen. Andreas Nick and Kai Whittaker publicly endorsed him in November 2020.

== Opinion polls ==
Fieldwork date	Pollster	Sample size	Laschet	Merz	Röttgen	Others/None	Undecided/ Don't know
9–11 January 2021	Civey	5,001 voters	13%	30%	32%	—	25%
9–11 January 2021	Civey	CDU/CSU voters	11%	41%	31%	—	17%
4–5 January 2021	Infratest Dimap	1,020 voters	18%	27%	22%	19%	—
4–5 January 2021	Infratest Dimap	CDU/CSU voters	25%	29%	25%	—	—
18–20 December 2020	Civey	7,514 voters	11,8%	28,8%	31,7%	—	27,7%
18–20 December 2020	Civey	CDU/CSU voters	11,1%	38,0%	28,9%	—	22,0%
27–30 November 2020	Civey	5,003 voters	12,7%	33,4%	27,4%	—	26,5%
27–30 November 2020	Civey	CDU/CSU voters	13%	43%	23%	—	22%
24–25 November 2020	Infratest Dimap	1,047 voters	15%	27%	16%	21%	—
24–25 November 2020	Infratest Dimap	CDU voters	15%	39%	22%	15%	—
30 October–2 November 2020	Civey	5,003 voters	8,1%	25,9%	10,6%	Spahn 23,3% Others 21,0%	11,1%
30 October–2 November 2020	Civey	CDU/CSU voters	8,1%	33,4%	9,1%	Spahn 27,4% Others 15,9%	6,1%
20–22 October 2020	Forsa	1,007 CDU members	24%	45%	13%	—	—
23–27 September 2020	Civey	5,018 voters	9,7%	25,5%	11,4%	Spahn 17,7% Others 23,6%	12,1%
23–27 September 2020	Civey	CDU/CSU voters	8,7%	35,6%	10,0%	Spahn 21,2% Others 18,3%	6,2%
3–5 March 2020	Forschungsgruppe Wahlen	1,276 voters	24%	27%	11%	30%	—
3–5 March 2020	Forschungsgruppe Wahlen	CDU/CSU voters	27%	40%	10%	19%	—

Delegate estimations

Publication date	Publisher	Laschet	Merz	Röttgen	Unknown
14 January 2021	The European	310	410	180	100
11 January 2021	The European	310	395	125	170
8 January 2021	The European	290	395	115	200
3 January 2021	The European	260	380	60	300

== Results ==
Candidate	First round		Second round	
Candidate	Votes	%	Votes	%
Armin Laschet	380	38.42	521	52.57
Friedrich Merz	385	38.93	466	47.02
Norbert Röttgen	224	22.65		
Abstentions	3	0.30	4	0.40
Total valid votes	992	100.0	991	100.0
Invalid/blank votes	–	–	–	–
Total votes	992	100.0	991	100.0

First Round
Merz	38.93%
Laschet	38.42%
Röttgen	22.65%

Second Round
Laschet	52.57%
Merz	47.02%
