= Christian Democratic Union of Germany =

Centre-right political party in Germany

Christian Democratic Union of Germany Christlich Demokratische Union Deutschlands
- Abbreviation: CDU
- Leader: Friedrich Merz
- General Secretary: Franziska Hoppermann
- Founded: 26 June 1945; 81 years ago
- Headquarters: Konrad-Adenauer-Haus, Klingelhöferstraße 8, 10785 Berlin
- Newspaper: Union
- Student wing: Association of Christian Democratic Students
- Youth wing: Young Union
- Women's wing: Women's Union
- LGBTQ wing: LSU Germany
- Membership: ▼356,769 (2025 est.)
- Ideology: Conservatism (German); Christian democracy
- Political position: Centre-right
- National affiliation: CDU/CSU (since 1949)
- European affiliation: European People's Party
- European Parliament group: European People's Party Group
- International affiliation: Centrist Democrat International; International Democracy Union
- Colours: Turquoise (official) (Note: Since September 2023); Black (customary)
- Bundestag: 164 / 630
- Bundesrat: 23 / 69
- State Parliaments: 498 / 1,875
- European Parliament: 23 / 96
- Heads of State Governments: 7 / 16

Party flag

Website
- cdu.de

The Christian Democratic Union of Germany (German: Christlich Demokratische Union Deutschlands [ˈkʁɪstlɪç demoˈkʁaːtɪʃə ʔuˈni̯oːn ˈdɔʏtʃlants], CDU [ˌtseːdeːˈʔuː]) is a Christian democratic and conservative political party in Germany. It is the major party of the centre-right in German politics. Friedrich Merz has been federal chairman of the CDU since 31 January 2022, and has served as the Chancellor of Germany since 6 May 2025. Black, associated with the cassocks that Christian clergy wear, is the party's customary and historical electoral color.

The CDU is active in only 15 of 16 states, as its "sister party", the Christian Social Union in Bavaria (CSU), takes its place in that state. When local and regional parties were allowed in the occupation zones after 1945, Christian parties had developed in parallel, but Bavaria did not merge with other West German chapters that formed the CDU. CDU and CSU members join a united faction within the Bundestag, "the Union" (CDU/CSU), but remain and run as organizationally separate parties. Like all parties, the CSU has to pass the Germany-wide 5% electoral threshold on its own, only from the Bavarian votes, which was not an issue in the past. Having won a combined 22.5% + 6% = 28.5% of votes in the 2025 federal election, the CDU/CSU with 208 out of 630 seats is the largest faction in the 21st Bundestag, the current German federal legislature. The group's first parliamentary leader had been Jens Spahn from 5 May 2025 to summer 2026.

Founded in 1945 as an interdenominational Christian party, the CDU effectively succeeded the traditional Catholic Centre Party that was active from 1870 until 1933. When political parties were allowed in Allied-occupied Germany, many former Centre members joined the all-Christian CDU, including its first leader Konrad Adenauer. The party also included politicians of other backgrounds, including liberals and conservatives. As a result, the party claims to represent "Christian-social, liberal and conservative" elements. The CDU is generally pro-European in outlook.

The CDU leads the federal government in a grand coalition with the Social Democratic Party of Germany (SPD), after returning as the largest party in the 2025 federal election. It previously led the federal government from 1949 to 1969, 1982 to 1998, and 2005 to 2021. Germany's three longest-serving post-war Chancellors have all come from the CDU, specifically: Konrad Adenauer (1949–1963), Helmut Kohl (1982–1998) and Angela Merkel (2005–2021). The party also currently leads the governments of seven of Germany's 16 states. In the former German Democratic Republic, which existed from 1949 until unification, there was also a CDU (called East CDU); it was a bloc party and part of the National Front with the Socialist Unity Party.

The CDU is a member of the Centrist Democrat International (CDI), the International Democracy Union (IDU), and the European People's Party (EPP). It is the largest party in the EPP with 23 MEPs. Ursula von der Leyen, the current President of the European Commission, is also a member of the CDU.

== History ==
=== Founding period ===
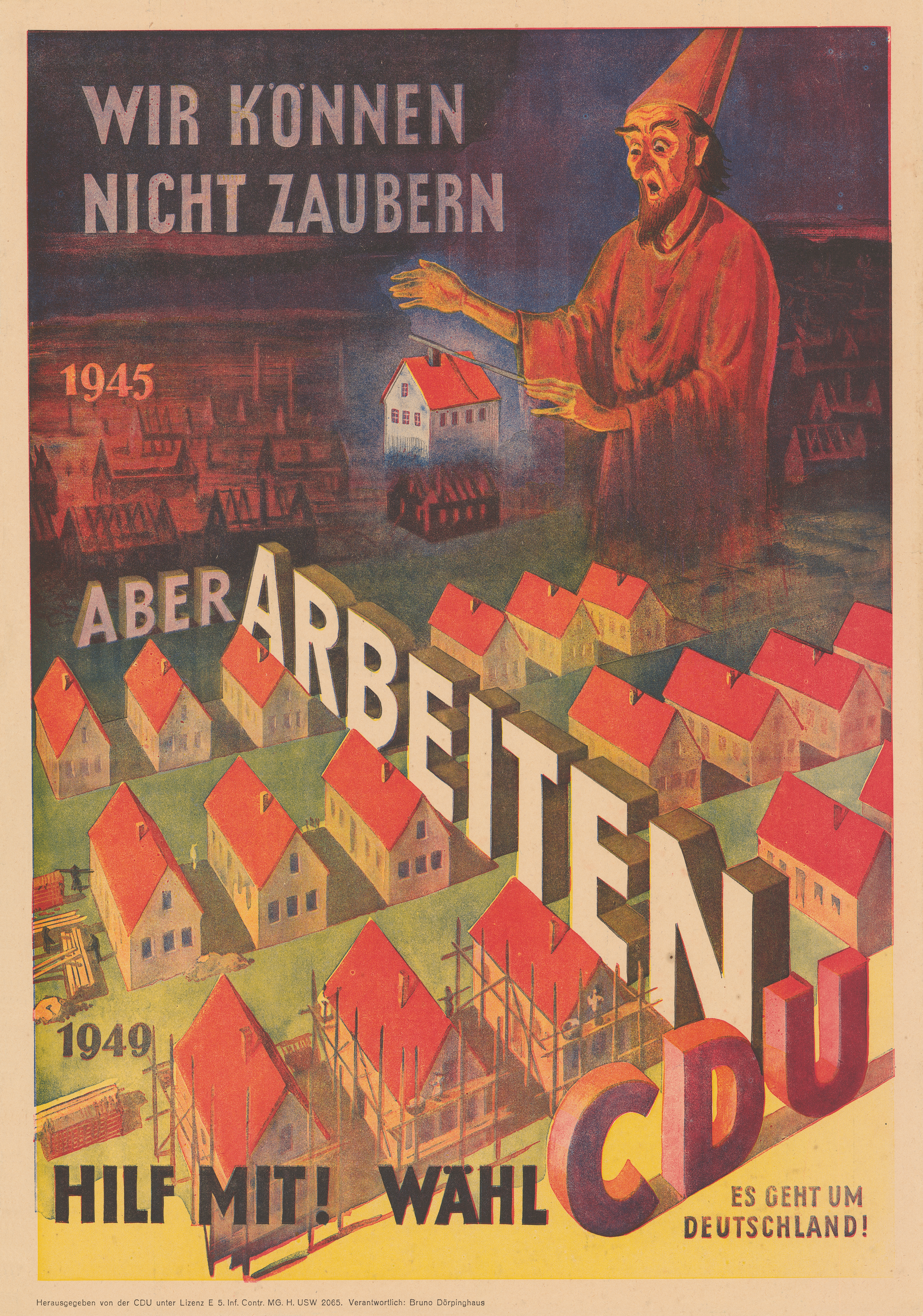
1949 election poster of the CDU reading "We cannot do magic — but we can work/do our job. Help us. Vote for CDU. Germany is at stake!"

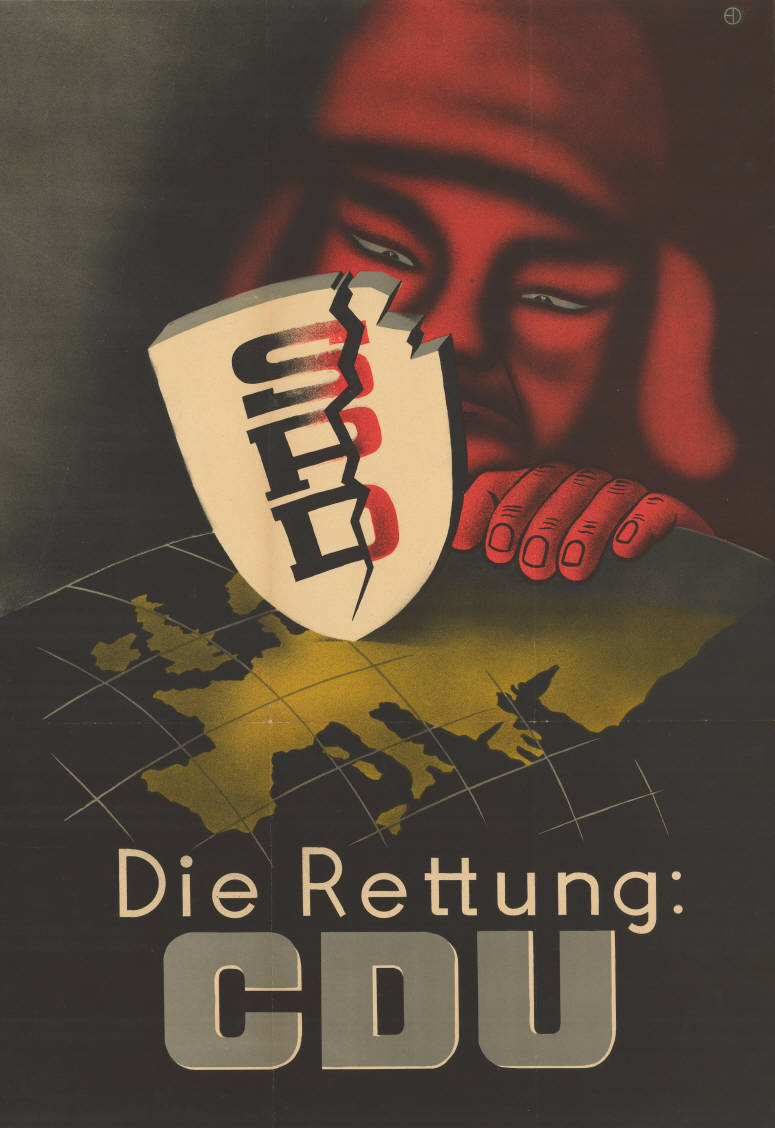
1949 election poster of the CDU reading "The Rescue: CDU"

Immediately following the end of World War II and the foreign occupation of Germany, simultaneous yet unrelated meetings began occurring throughout the country, each with the intention of planning a Christian-democratic party. Consequently, the CDU was established in Berlin on 26 June 1945 and in Rheinland and Westfalen in September of the same year.

The result of these meetings was the establishment of an inter-confessional (Catholic and Protestant alike) party influenced heavily by the political tradition of liberal conservatism. The CDU experienced considerable success gaining widespread support from the time of its creation in Berlin on 26 June 1945 until its first convention on 21 October 1950, at which future West German Chancellor Konrad Adenauer was named the first Chairman of the party.

=== Adenauer era (1949–1963) ===
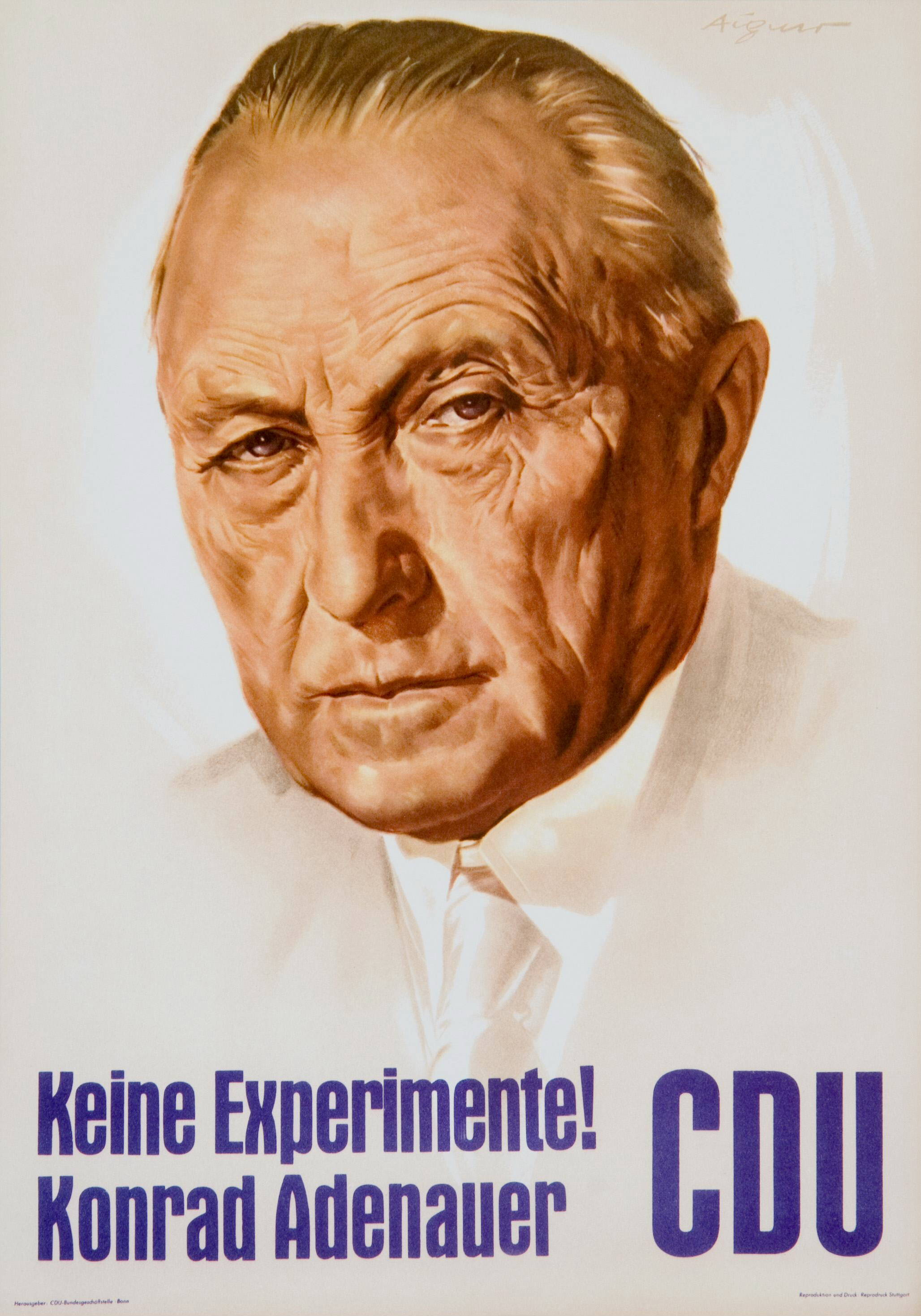
Poster for the 1957 West German federal election reading "No experiments" and featuring then Chancellor Konrad Adenauer. This was the only federal election in which the CDU obtained an absolute majority in the Bundestag.

In the beginning, it was not clear which party would be favored by the victors of World War II, but by the end of the 1940s the governments of the United States and of the United Kingdom began to lean more toward the CDU and significantly away from the Social Democratic Party of Germany (SPD), especially due to geopolitical reasons. The latter was more nationalist and sought German reunification even at the expense of concessions to the Soviet Union (USSR), depicting Adenauer as an instrument of both the Americans and the Vatican. The Western powers appreciated the CDU's right-ward slant, its commitment to capitalism, and its value as a pivotal oppositional force to the communists, thereby keeping consistent with US/UK foreign policy. In addition, Adenauer was also trusted by the British.

However, the party was split over issues of rearmament within the Western alliance and German unification as a neutral state. Adenauer staunchly defended his pro-Western position and outmaneuvered some of his opponents. He also refused to consider the SPD as a party of the coalition until he felt sure that they shared his anti-communist position. The principled rejection of a reunification that would alienate Germany from the Western alliance made it harder to attract Protestant voters to the party, as most refugees from the former German territories east of the Oder river were of that faith, as were the majority of the inhabitants of East Germany.

Therefore, the CDU was the dominant political party for the first two decades following the establishment of West Germany in 1949. The durable alliance that the party had established with the liberal Free Democratic Party (FDP) as the leading tandem of several federal governments, and, implicitly, the strong partnership between Chancellor Adenauer and President Theodor Heuss enabled West Germany to thoroughly rebuild itself in the wake of World War II. Adenauer remained the party's leader until 1963, when former Minister of Economics Ludwig Erhard replaced him. As the Free Democratic Party (FDP) withdrew from the governing coalition in 1966 due to disagreements over fiscal and economic policy, Erhard was forced to resign. Consequently, a grand coalition with the SPD took over government under CDU Chancellor Kurt Georg Kiesinger.

=== Opposition against social-liberal governments (1969–1982) ===
The SPD quickly gained popularity and succeeded in forming a social-liberal coalition with the FDP following the 1969 federal election, forcing the CDU out of power for the first time in its history. The CDU and CSU were highly critical of Chancellor Willy Brandt's "change through rapprochement" policy towards the Eastern bloc (Ostpolitik) and protested sharply against the 1970 treaties of Moscow and Warsaw that renounced claims to the former eastern territories of Germany and recognised the Oder–Neisse line as Germany's eastern border. The Union parties had close ties with the Heimatvertriebene associations (Germans who fled or were expelled from the eastern territories) who hoped for a return of or in these territories. Seven Bundestag members, including former vice chancellor Erich Mende, defected from the FDP and SPD to the CDU in protest against these treaties, depriving Brandt of his majority, and providing a thin majority for the CDU and CSU. In April 1972, the CDU saw its chance to return to power, calling a constructive vote of no confidence. CDU chairman Rainer Barzel was almost certain to become the new Chancellor. But not all parliamentarians voted as expected (it was later revealed that two CDU/CSU deputies had been bribed by the East German Stasi): Brandt won the vote and stayed in office. Thus, the CDU continued its role as opposition for a total of 13 years. In 1982, the FDP withdrew from the coalition with the SPD and allowed the CDU to regain power.

=== Kohl era (1982–1998) ===
CDU Chairman Helmut Kohl became the new Chancellor of West Germany and his CDU/CSU–FDP coalition was confirmed in the 1983 federal election.

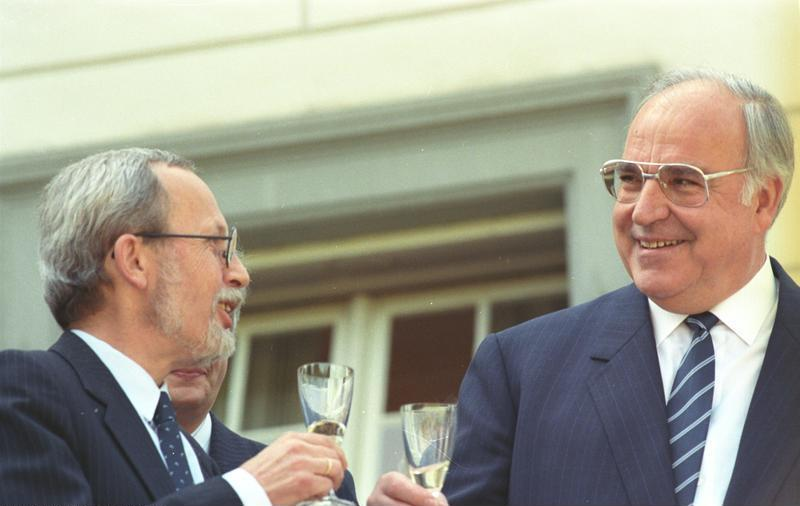
East German CDU leader Lothar de Maizière (left) with West German CDU leader Helmut Kohl in September 1990

After the collapse of the East German government in 1989, Kohl—supported by the governments of the United States and reluctantly by those of France and the United Kingdom—called for German reunification. On 3 October 1990, the government of East Germany was abolished and its territory acceded to the territory of the Basic Law already in place in West Germany. The East German CDU merged with its West German counterpart and elections were held for the reunified country. Public support for the coalition's work in the process of German reunification was reiterated in the 1990 federal election in which the CDU–FDP governing coalition experienced a clear victory. Although Kohl was re-elected, the party began losing much of its popularity because of an economic recession in the former GDR and increased taxes in the west. The CDU was nonetheless able to win the 1994 federal election by a narrow margin thanks to an economic recovery.

Kohl served as chairman until the party's electoral defeat in 1998, when he was succeeded by Wolfgang Schäuble. In the 1998 federal election, the CDU polled 28.4% and the CSU 6.7% of the national vote, the lowest result for those parties since 1949; a red–green coalition under the leadership of Gerhard Schröder took power until 2005.

=== Merkel era (2000–2018) ===
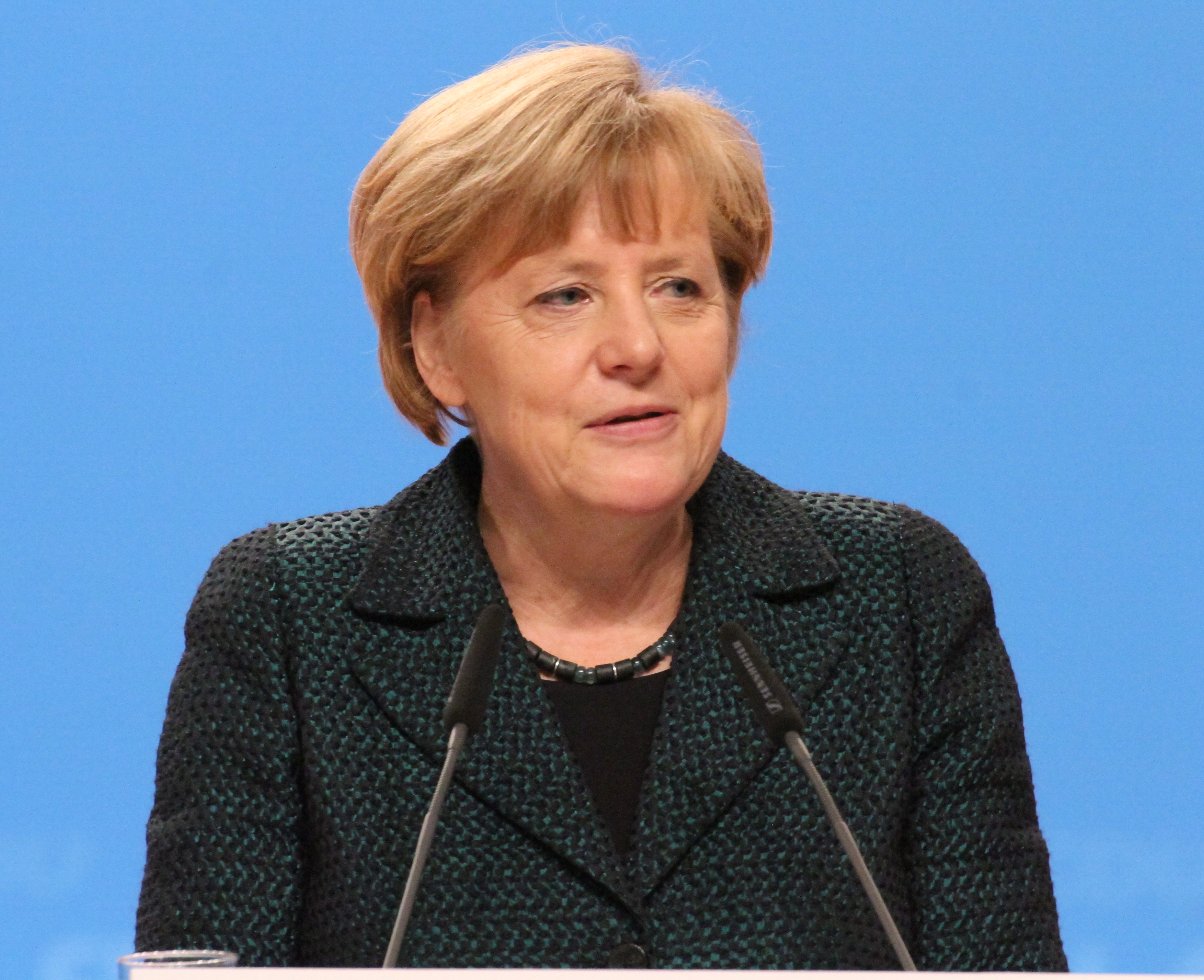
Angela Merkel was the first female leader of the CDU and the third longest serving of the party overall, after Kohl and Adenauer.

Schäuble resigned in early 2000 as a result of a party financing scandal and was replaced by Angela Merkel, the first woman and the first person from East Germany to lead the federal party. She remained the leader of the CDU for more than 18 years. In the 2002 federal election, Merkel ceded the position of CDU/CSU's joint candidate for the chancellor's office to the leader of the sister party, Bavarian minister-president Edmund Stoiber. CDU and CSU polled slightly higher (29.5% and 9.0%, respectively), but still lacked the majority needed for a CDU–FDP coalition government and stayed in opposition.

In 2005, early elections were called after the CDU dealt the governing SPD a major blow, winning more than ten state elections, most of which were landslide victories. The resulting grand coalition between the CDU/CSU and the SPD faced a serious challenge stemming from both parties' demand for the chancellorship. After three weeks of negotiations, the two parties reached a deal whereby CDU received the chancellorship while the SPD retained 8 of the 16 seats in the cabinet and a majority of the most prestigious cabinet posts. The coalition deal was approved by both parties at party conferences on 14 November. Merkel was confirmed as the first female Chancellor of Germany by the majority of delegates (397 to 217) in the newly assembled Bundestag on 22 November. Since her first term in office, from 2005 to 2009, there have been discussions if the CDU was still "sufficiently conservative" or if it was "social-democratising". In March 2009, Merkel answered with the statement "Sometimes I am liberal, sometimes I am conservative, sometimes I am Christian-social—and this is what defines the CDU."

Although the CDU/CSU lost support in the 2009 federal elections, their "desired partner" the FDP experienced the best election cycle in its history, thereby enabling a CDU/CSU–FDP coalition. This marked the first change of coalition partner by a Chancellor in German history and the first centre-right coalition government since 1998. CDU candidate Christian Wulff won the 2010 presidential election in the third ballot, while opposition candidate Joachim Gauck (a Protestant pastor and former anti-communist activist in East Germany, who was favoured even by some CDU members) received a number of "faithless" votes from the government camp.

The decisions to suspend conscription (late 2010) and to phase out nuclear energy (shortly after the Fukushima disaster in 2011) broke with long-term principles of the CDU, moving the party into a more socially liberal direction and alienating some of its more conservative members and voters. At its November 2011 conference the party proposed a "wage floor", after having expressly rejected minimum wages during the previous years. Psephologist and Merkel advisor Matthias Jung coined the term "asymmetric demobilisation" for the CDU's strategy (practised in the 2009, 2013 and 2017 campaigns) of adopting issues and positions close to its rivals, e.g. regarding social justice (SPD) and ecology (Greens), thus avoiding conflicts that might mobilise their potential supporters. Some of the promises in the CDU's 2013 election platform were seen as "overtaking the SPD on the left". While this strategy proved to be quite successful in elections, it also raised warnings that the CDU's profile would become "random", the party would lose its "essence" and it might even be dangerous for democracy in general if parties became indistinguishable and voters demotivated.

President Wulff resigned in February 2012 due to allegations of corruption, triggering an early presidential election. This time the CDU supported, reluctantly, nonpartisan candidate Joachim Gauck. The CDU/CSU–FDP coalition lasted until the 2013 federal election, when the FDP lost all its seats in the Bundestag while the CDU and CSU won their best result since 1990, only a few seats short of an absolute majority. This was partly due to the CDU's expansion of voter base to all socio-structural groups (class, age or gender), partly due to the personal popularity of Chancellor Merkel. After talks with the Greens had failed, the CDU/CSU formed a new grand coalition with the SPD.

Despite their long-cherished slogan of "There must be no democratically legitimised party to the right of CDU/CSU", the Union has had a serious competitor to its right since 2013. The right-wing populist Alternative for Germany (AfD) was founded with the involvement of disgruntled CDU members. It drew on the discontent of some conservatives with the Merkel administration's handling of the European debt crisis (2009–14) and later the 2015 refugee crisis, lamenting a purported loss of sovereignty and control or even "state failure". Nearly 10 percent of early AfD members were defectors from the CDU.

In 2017, the Bundestag voted to legalise same-sex marriage. Merkel had allowed the conscience vote to happen despite her personal objections. While she herself and the majority of the party's representatives voted against the proposal, a number of CDU deputies supported it. In the 2017 election, the CDU and CSU lost a large portion of their vote share: With 26.8 percent of party list votes, the CDU received its worst result since 1949, losing more than fifty seats in the Bundestag (despite an enlargement of the parliament). After failing to negotiate a coalition with the FDP and Greens, they continued their grand coalition with the SPD. In October 2018, Merkel announced that she would step down as leader of the CDU that December and not seek reelection, but wanted to remain as Chancellor until 2021.

=== Post-Merkel and Merz era (2018–present) ===
On 7 December 2018, Annegret Kramp-Karrenbauer was elected as federal chairwoman of the CDU. Kramp-Karrenbauer was considered Merkel's ideological successor, though holding more socially conservative positions, such as opposition to same-sex marriage. Kramp-Karrenbauer's election saw a rise in support for the CDU in national polling, and her personal popularity was initially high. However, she suffered a sharp decline in popularity in the lead-up to the 2019 European Parliament election, in which the CDU/CSU suffered its worst ever result in a national election with just 29%. Kramp-Karrenbauer thereafter remained one of the least popular politicians nationally.

The CSU's Manfred Weber was the Spitzenkandidat for the European People's Party in the 2019 European Parliament election. However, the EPP group ultimately nominated the CDU's Ursula von der Leyen as their candidate for President of the European Commission; she was elected in July 2019, becoming the first woman to hold the office.

Kramp-Karrenbauer resigned as party chair on 10 February 2020, in the midst of the 2020 Thuringian government crisis. The Thuringian CDU had been perceived as cooperating with the Alternative for Germany (AfD) to prevent the election of a left-wing government, breaching the long-standing taboo in Germany surrounding cooperation with the far-right. Kramp-Karrenbauer was perceived as unable to enforce discipline within the party during the crisis, which she claimed was complicated by unclear positions within the party regarding cooperation with the AfD and The Left, which party statute holds to be equally unacceptable. While the Thuringia crisis was the immediate trigger for Kramp-Karrenbauer's resignation, she stated the decision had "matured some time ago", and media attributed it to the troubled development of her brief leadership.

Kramp-Karrenbauer remained in office as Minister of Defence and interim party leader from February until the leadership election was held in January 2021. Originally scheduled for April 2020, it was delayed multiple times due to the COVID-19 pandemic, and was ultimately held online. Minister-President of North Rhine-Westphalia Armin Laschet won the election with 52.8% of delegate votes. His main opponent Friedrich Merz, was seen as more right-wing, who won 47.2% of vote; Merz had also run against Kramp-Karrenbauer in 2018 and been defeated. Laschet's election was seen as an affirmation of Merkel's leadership and the CDU's centrist orientation.

On 7 October 2021, Armin Laschet, signaled that he would step down after a disastrous general election result, with the CDU suffering its worst ever general election result. A new leadership election was called in December and Friedrich Merz, of the right-wing faction of the CDU, was elected by a large majority of 62.1% of voters, defeating pro-Merkel candidates Norbert Röttgen and Helge Braun. The Congress of the CDU officially elected Merz as new party Chairman on 22 January 2022, and he assumed office on 31 January 2022.

In the 2024 European parliament election, the CDU remained the largest party in Germany, winning 30.0% of the vote in a combined list with the CSU, led by CSU MEP Manfred Weber. The combined list held on to all 29 seats, with the CDU maintaining 23 seats while the CSU had the remaining 6 seats. In October 2024, CDU again became proponents of nuclear energy, advocating reactivation of closed reactors and construction of new plants.

The CDU contested the 2025 German federal election with Friedrich Merz as their chancellor candidate. Their manifesto signalled a shift to the right on immigration as well as increased support for Ukraine. The CDU eventually won the election, gaining 12 seats. Following the election results, the CDU began negotiations with the SPD to form another grand coalition. In May 2025, Friedrich Merz, leader of the CDU, formed a coalition government between the CDU/CSU and the SPD (grand coalition). Co-leader of the SPD, Lars Klingbeil, became vice chancellor and finance minister of the new government.

Merz promoted stricter laws on immigration. He has been described as taking a more conservative approach compared to the centrism of Merkel. He has proposed reforming the country's welfare system and reducing social spending. He has stated that Europe should be less dependent on the United States.

== Ideology and platform ==
In her 2005 campaign, Angela Merkel was unwilling to express explicitly Christian views while maintaining that her party had never lost its concept of values. Merkel and Bundestag President Norbert Lammert have been keen to clarify that CDU references to the "dominant culture" imply "tolerance and living together". According to party analyst Stephan Eisel, her avoiding the values issue may have had the opposite effect as she failed to mobilize the party's core constituency.

The CDU applies the principles of Christian democracy and emphasizes the "Christian understanding of humans and their responsibility toward God". However, CDU membership consists of people adhering to a variety of religions as well as non-religious individuals. The CDU's policies derive from political Catholicism, Catholic social teaching and political Protestantism as well as economic liberalism and national conservatism. The party has adopted more liberal economic policies since Helmut Kohl's term in office as the Chancellor of Germany (1982–1998).

In the 2020s, the CDU has shifted towards a more hard-right position on various topics, embracing stricter immigration reforms and engaging in heated debates around deportations, whether legal or not. Their policies have leaned towards anti-welfare measures, promoting job creation and business growth, while also opposing climate legislation and cutting back on support for renewable energy. To regain voters from the right-wing Alternative for Germany (AfD), the CDU has adopted a more aggressive conservative tone on social issues and national identity. This shift reflects their strategy to appeal to a base that values traditional values and a strong national identity.

As a conservative party, the CDU supports stronger punishments of crimes and involvement on the part of the Bundeswehr in cases of domestic anti-terrorism offensives. In terms of immigrants, the CDU supports initiatives to integrate immigrants through language courses and aims to further control immigration. It holds that dual citizenship should only be allowed in exceptional cases.

In terms of foreign policy, the CDU commits itself to European integration and a strong relation with the United States. In the European Union, the party opposes the entry of Turkey, preferring instead a privileged partnership. In addition to citing various human rights violations, the CDU also believes that Turkey's unwillingness to recognise Cyprus as an independent sovereign state contradicts the European Union policy that its members must recognise the existence of one another.

The party supports a business-friendly adaptation of the European Green Deal, and would like to continue to allow vehicles with combustion engines, research synthetic fuels and promote research into nuclear fusion. The party calls for EU member states to limit their annual borrowing to three percent of their gross domestic product.

The CDU has governed in four federal-level and numerous state-level Grand Coalitions with the Social Democratic Party (SPD) as well as in state and local-level coalitions with the Alliance 90/The Greens.

=== Cordon sanitaire ===
The CDU has an official party congress adjudication that prohibits coalitions and any sort of cooperation with either The Left or the Alternative for Germany.

CDU officially prohibits any cooperation with the AfD, but does not clearly define what that means. In the eastern federal states, however, there is ongoing tolerance for, or cooperation of CDU with, the right-wing radical AfD at the local and district level.

CDU leader Friedrich Merz took blowback for his political approaches to the AfD after he called his party in 2023 an "alternative... with substance". Political observers from abroad say that the CDU's boundaries with the far-right are eroding.

== Organisation ==
=== Structure ===
==== Party congress ====
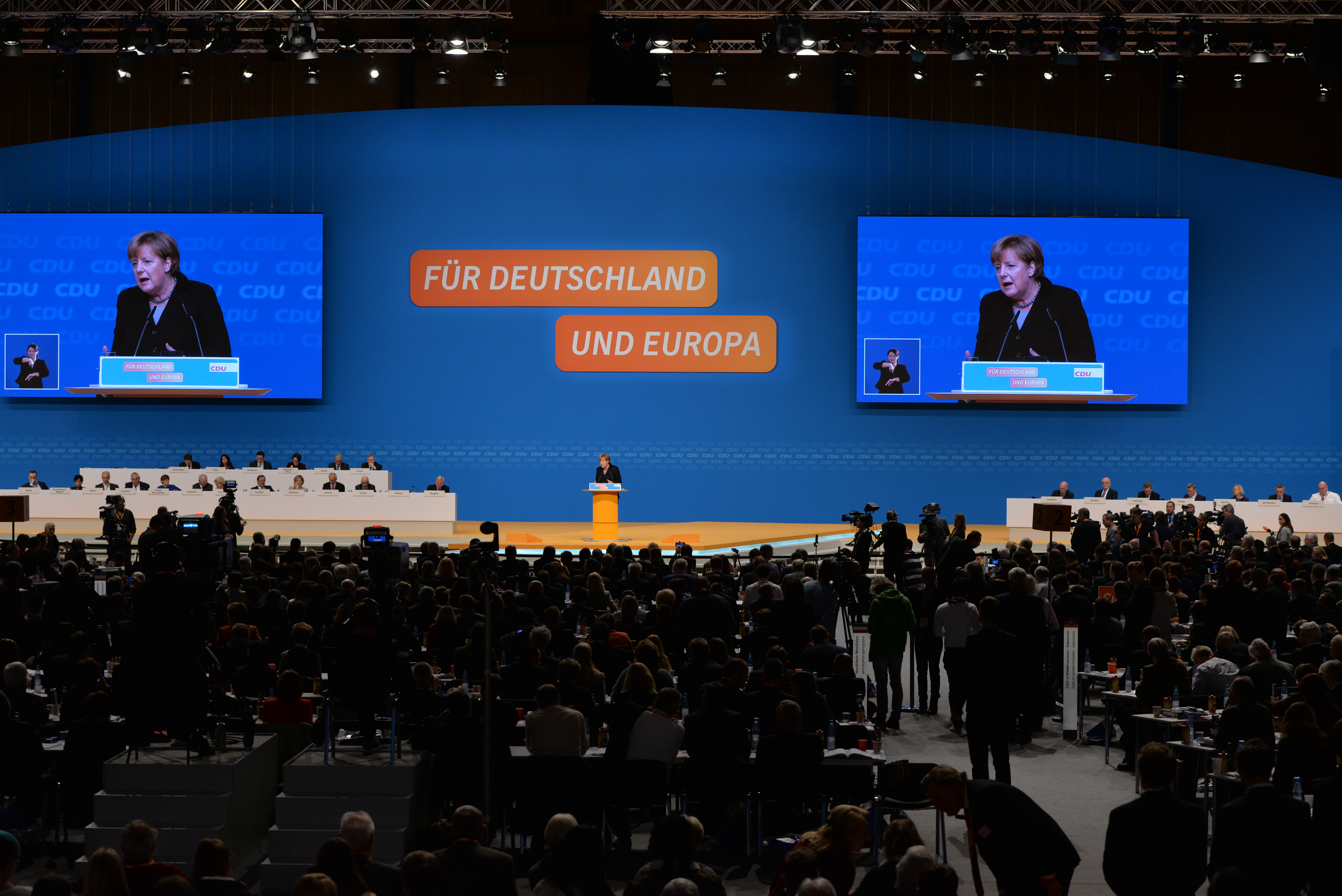
28th party conference in 2015

The party congress is the highest organ of the CDU. It meets at least every two years, determines the basic lines of CDU policy, approves the party program and decides on the statutes of the CDU.

The CDU party congress consists of the delegates of the CDU regional associations, the foreign associations and the honorary chairmen. The state associations send exactly 1,000 delegates who have to be elected by the state or district conventions. The number of delegates that a regional association can send depends on the number of members of the association six months before the party congress and the result of the last federal election in the respective federal state. The foreign associations recognized by the federal executive committee each send a delegate to the party congress, regardless of their number of members.

==== Federal committee ====
The federal committee is the second highest body and deals with all political and organizational matters that are not expressly reserved for the federal party congress. For this reason it is often called a small party congress.

==== Federal executive board and presidium ====
The CDU federal executive heads the federal party. It implements the resolutions of the federal party congress and the federal committee and convenes the federal party congress. The CDU Presidium is responsible for executing the resolutions of the federal executive committee and handling current and urgent business. It consists of the leading members of the federal executive board and is not an organ of the CDU in Germany.

=== Leadership ===
==== Leader of the CDU, 1946–present ====
Leader		Year
1	Konrad Adenauer	1946–1966
2	Ludwig Erhard	1966–1967
3	Kurt Georg Kiesinger	1967–1971
4	Rainer Barzel	1971–1973
5	Helmut Kohl	1973–1998
6	Wolfgang Schäuble	1998–2000
7	Angela Merkel	2000–2018
8	Annegret Kramp-Karrenbauer	2018–2021
9	Armin Laschet	2021–2022
10	Friedrich Merz	2022–present

==== Leader of the CDU/CSU Group in the Bundestag ====
Leader in the Bundestag		Year
1	Heinrich von Brentano (First term)	1949–1955
2	Heinrich Krone	1955–1961
(1)	Heinrich von Brentano (Second term)	1961–1964
3	Rainer Barzel	1964–1973
4	Karl Carstens	1973–1976
5	Helmut Kohl	1976–1982
6	Alfred Dregger	1982–1991
7	Wolfgang Schäuble	1991–2000
8	Friedrich Merz (First term)	2000–2002
9	Angela Merkel	2002–2005
10	Volker Kauder	2005–2018
11	Ralph Brinkhaus	2018–2022
(8)	Friedrich Merz (Second term)	2022–2025
12	Jens Spahn	2025–present

=== Regional leadership ===
State	Leader
Baden-Württemberg	Manuel Hagel
Berlin	Stefan Evers
Brandenburg	Jan Redmann
Bremen	Heiko Strohmann
Hamburg	Dennis Thering
Hesse	Boris Rhein
Lower Saxony	Sebastian Lechner
Mecklenburg-Vorpommern	Philipp Amthor
North Rhine-Westphalia	Hendrik Wüst
Rhineland-Palatinate	Gordon Schnieder
Saarland	Stephan Toscani
Saxony	Michael Kretschmer
Saxony-Anhalt	Sven Schulze
Schleswig-Holstein	Daniel Günther
Thuringia	Mario Voigt

=== Membership ===
Before 1966, membership totals in the CDU organisation were only estimated. The numbers after 1966 are based on the total from 31 December of the previous year. In 2023, the CDU had 363.101 members.

=== Special organizations ===
Notable suborganisations of the CDU are the following:

- Young Union (JU), the common youth organisation of the CDU and the CSU.
- Christian Democratic Employees' Association (CDA), an association in the tradition of Christian trade unionism, representing Christian-democratic wage earners.
- Evangelical Working Group of the CDU/CSU (EAK, together with the CSU), representing the Protestant minority in the party.
- Association of Christian Democratic Students (RCDS), the student organisation of the party.
- Women's Union (FU), the women's wing of the party.
- LSU Germany, as of 2022 Hannover party caucus is an officially affiliated group (Sonderorganisation), representing LGBT+ members of the CDU.

==== Konrad Adenauer Foundation ====
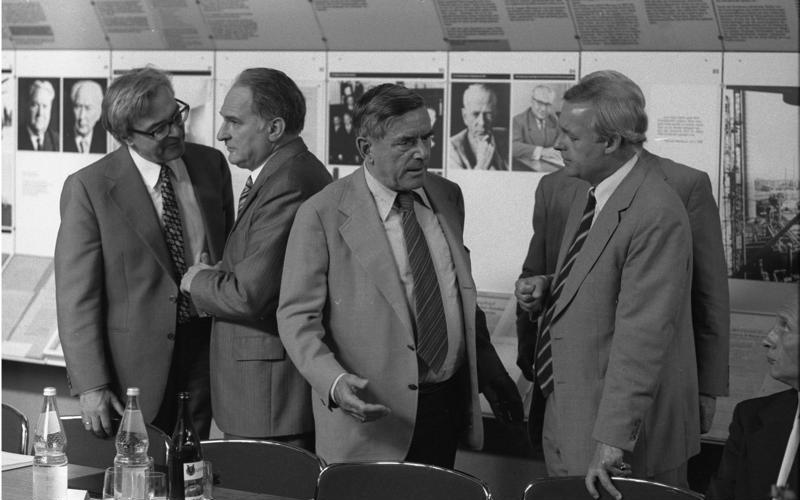
1978 conference in Rhöndorf with eminent historian Golo Mann (center)

The Konrad Adenauer Foundation is the think-tank of the CDU. It is named after the first Chancellor of the Federal Republic of Germany and first president of the CDU. The foundation offers political education, conducts scientific fact-finding research for political projects, grants scholarships to gifted individuals, researches the history of Christian democracy and supports and encourages European unification, international understanding and development-policy cooperation. Its annual budget amounts to around 120 million euro and is mostly funded by taxpayer money.

=== Relationship with the CSU ===
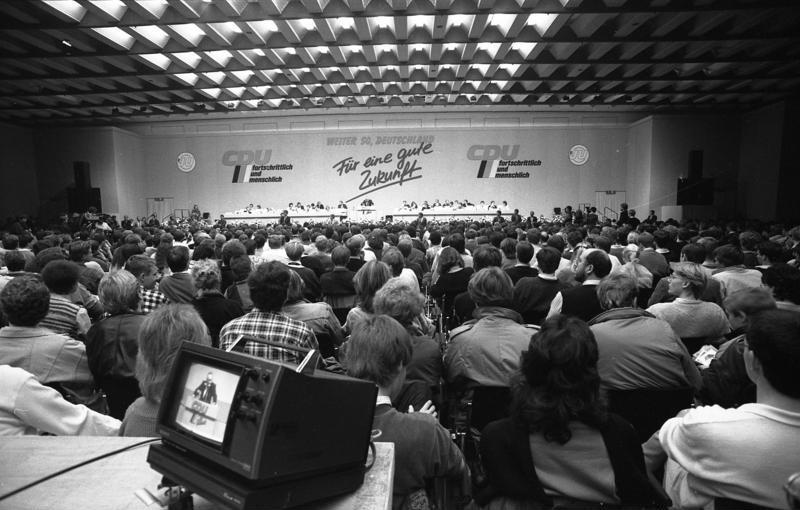
1986 Germany Day of Junge Union in Cologne

Both the CDU and the Christian Social Union in Bavaria (CSU) originated after World War II, sharing a concern for the Christian worldview. In the Bundestag, the CDU is represented in a common faction with the CSU. This faction is called CDU/CSU, or informally the Union. Its basis is a binding agreement known as a Fraktionsvertrag between the two parties.

The CDU and CSU share a common youth organisation, the Junge Union, a common pupil organisation, the Schüler Union Deutschlands, a common student organisation, the Ring Christlich-Demokratischer Studenten and a common Mittelstand organisation, the Mittelstands- und Wirtschaftsvereinigung.

The CDU and CSU are legally and organisationally separate parties; their ideological differences are sometimes a source of conflict. The most notable and serious such incident was in 1976, when the CSU under Franz Josef Strauß ended the alliance with the CDU at a party conference in Wildbad Kreuth. This decision was reversed shortly thereafter when the CDU threatened to run candidates against the CSU in Bavaria.

The relationship of CDU to the CSU has historic parallels to previous Christian-democratic parties in Germany, with the Catholic Centre Party having served as a national Catholic party throughout the German Empire and the Weimar Republic while the Bavarian People's Party functioning as the Bavarian variant.

Since its formation, the CSU has been more conservative than the CDU. The CSU and the state of Bavaria decided not to sign the Basic Law for the Federal Republic of Germany as they insisted on more autonomy for the individual states. The CSU has actively participated in all political affairs of the Bundestag, the German government, the Bundesrat, the parliamentary elections of the German President, the European Parliament and meetings with Mikhail Gorbachev in Russia.

== Notable members ==
=== Federal presidents from the CDU ===
President of Germany	Time in office
Heinrich Lübke	1959–1969
Karl Carstens	1979–1984
Richard von Weizsäcker	1984–1994
Roman Herzog	1994–1999
Horst Köhler	2004–2010
Christian Wulff	2010–2012

=== German chancellors from the CDU ===
Chancellor of Germany	Time in office
Konrad Adenauer	1949–1963
Ludwig Erhard	1963–1966
Kurt Georg Kiesinger	1966–1969
Helmut Kohl	1982–1998
Angela Merkel	2005–2021
Friedrich Merz	2025–present

=== Vice-chancellors from the CDU ===
Vice-Chancellor of Germany	Time in office
Ludwig Erhard	1957–1963
Hans-Christoph Seebohm	1966

== Election results ==
=== Federal parliament (Bundestag) ===
Election	Leader	Constituency		Party list		Seats	+/–	Government
Election	Leader	Votes	%	Votes	%	Seats	+/–	Government
1949	Konrad Adenauer			5,978,636	25.2 (#1)	115 / 402		CDU/CSU–FDP–DP
1953	Konrad Adenauer	9,577,659	34.8 (#1)	10,016,594	36.4 (#1)	197 / 509	▲82	CDU/CSU–FDP–DP
1957	Konrad Adenauer	11,975,400	39.7 (#1)	11,875,339	39.7 (#1)	222 / 519	▲25	CDU/CSU
1961	Konrad Adenauer	11,622,995	36.3 (#2)	11,283,901	35.8 (#2)	201 / 521	▼21	CDU/CSU–FDP
1965	Ludwig Erhard	12,631,319	38.9 (#2)	12,387,562	38.0 (#2)	202 / 518	▲2	CDU/CSU–FDP (1965–66)
1965	Ludwig Erhard	12,631,319	38.9 (#2)	12,387,562	38.0 (#2)	202 / 518	▲2	CDU/CSU–SPD (1966–69)
1969	Kurt Georg Kiesinger	12,137,148	37.1 (#2)	12,079,535	36.6 (#2)	201 / 518	▼1	Opposition
1972	Rainer Barzel	13,304,813	35.7 (#2)	13,190,837	35.2 (#2)	186 / 518	▼15	Opposition
1976	Helmut Kohl	14,423,157	38.3 (#2)	14,367,302	38.0 (#2)	201 / 518	▲15	Opposition
1980	Helmut Kohl	13,467,207	35.6 (#2)	12,989,200	34.2 (#2)	185 / 519	▼16	Opposition (1980–82)
1980	Helmut Kohl	13,467,207	35.6 (#2)	12,989,200	34.2 (#2)	185 / 519	▼16	CDU/CSU–FDP (1982–83)
1983	Helmut Kohl	15,943,460	41.0 (#1)	14,857,680	38.1 (#2)	202 / 520	▲17	CDU/CSU–FDP
1987	Helmut Kohl	14,168,527	37.5 (#2)	13,045,745	34.4 (#2)	185 / 519	▼17	CDU/CSU–FDP
1990	Helmut Kohl	17,707,574	38.3 (#1)	17,055,116	36.7 (#1)	268 / 662	▲83	CDU/CSU–FDP
1994	Helmut Kohl	17,473,325	37.2 (#2)	16,089,960	34.2 (#2)	244 / 672	▼24	CDU/CSU–FDP
1998	Helmut Kohl	15,854,215	32.2 (#2)	14,004,908	28.4 (#2)	198 / 669	▼46	Opposition
2002	Angela Merkel	15,336,512	32.1 (#2)	14,167,561	29.5 (#2)	190 / 603	▼8	Opposition
2005	Angela Merkel	15,390,950	32.6 (#2)	13,136,740	27.8 (#2)	180 / 614	▼10	CDU/CSU–SPD
2009	Angela Merkel	13,856,674	32.0 (#1)	11,828,277	27.3 (#1)	194 / 622	▲14	CDU/CSU–FDP
2013	Angela Merkel	16,233,642	37.2 (#1)	14,921,877	34.1 (#1)	254 / 630	▲61	CDU/CSU–SPD
2017	Angela Merkel	14,027,804	30.2 (#1)	12,445,832	26.8 (#1)	200 / 709	▼54	CDU/CSU–SPD
2021	Armin Laschet	10,445,571	22.6 (#2)	8,770,980	19.0 (#2)	152 / 735	▼48	Opposition
2025	Friedrich Merz	12,601,967	25.5 (#1)	11,194,700	22.5 (#1)	164 / 630	▲12	CDU/CSU–SPD

=== European Parliament ===
Election	Votes	%	Seats	+/–	EP Group
1979	10,883,085	39.08 (#2)	33 / 81	New	EPP
1984	9,308,411	37.46 (#1)	32 / 81	▲1	EPP
1989	8,332,846	29.54 (#2)	24 / 81	▼8	EPP
1994	11,346,073	32.04 (#2)	39 / 99	▲15	EPP
1999	10,628,224	39.28 (#1)	43 / 99	▲4	EPP-ED
2004	9,412,009	36.51 (#1)	40 / 99	▼3	EPP-ED
2009	8,071,391	30.65 (#1)	34 / 99	▼6	EPP
2014	8,807,500	30.02 (#1)	29 / 96	▼5	EPP
2019	8,437,093	22.57 (#1)	23 / 96	▼6	EPP
2024	9,431,567	23.70 (#1)	23 / 96	0	EPP

=== State parliaments (Länder) ===
The CDU does not contest elections in Bavaria due to the alliance with Bavarian sister party, the Christian Social Union in Bavaria.

State parliament	Election	Votes	%	Seats	+/–	Government
Baden-Württemberg	2026	1,595,844	29.7 (#2)	56 / 157	▲14	Greens–CDU
Berlin	2026	342,516	18.8 (#2)	34 / 158	▼18	Opposition
Brandenburg	2024	181,632	12.1 (#4)	12 / 88	▼3	Opposition (2024–26)
Brandenburg	2024	181,632	12.1 (#4)	12 / 88	▼3	SPD–CDU (since 2026)
Bremen	2023	331,380	26.7 (#2)	24 / 84	0	Opposition
Hamburg	2025	864,700	19.8 (#2)	26 / 121	▲11	Opposition
Hesse	2023	972,595	34.6 (#1)	52 / 133	▲12	CDU–SPD
Lower Saxony	2022	1,017,276	28.1 (#2)	47 / 146	▼3	Opposition
Mecklenburg-Vorpommern	2026	49,629	4.9 (#5)	0 / 71	▼12	No seats
North Rhine-Westphalia	2022	2,552,276	35.7 (#1)	76 / 195	▲4	CDU–Greens
Rhineland-Palatinate	2026	627,909	31.0 (#1)	39 / 105	▲8	CDU–SPD
Saarland	2022	129,156	28.5 (#2)	19 / 51	▼5	Opposition
Saxony	2024	749,216	31.9 (#1)	41 / 120	▼4	CDU–SPD
Saxony-Anhalt	2026	226,622	17.23 (#2)	15 / 83	▼25	TBD
Schleswig-Holstein	2022	601,943	43.4 (#1)	34 / 69	▲9	CDU–Greens
Thuringia	2024	285,141	23.6 (#2)	23 / 88	▲2	CDU–BSW–SPD (2024–26)
Thuringia	2024	285,141	23.6 (#2)	23 / 88	▲2	CDU–T.G–SPD (since 2026)

Best historic state results
State	Election	%	Seats	Result
Baden-Württemberg	1976	56.7 (#1)	71 / 121	Majority
Berlin	1981	48.0 (#1)	65 / 132	Minority
Brandenburg	1999	26.5 (#2)	25 / 89	Coalition
Bremen	1999	37.1 (#2)	42 / 100	Coalition
Hamburg	2004	47.2 (#1)	63 / 121	Majority
Hesse	2003	48.8 (#1)	56 / 110	Majority
Lower Saxony	1982	50.7 (#1)	87 / 171	Majority
Mecklenburg-Vorpommern	1990	38.3 (#1)	29 / 66	Coalition
North Rhine-Westphalia	1958	50.5 (#1)	104 / 200	Majority
Rhineland-Palatinate	1983	51.9 (#1)	57 / 100	Majority
Saarland	1975	49.1 (#1)	25 / 50	Coalition
Saxony	1994	58.1 (#1)	77 / 120	Majority
Saxony-Anhalt	1990	39.0 (#1)	48 / 106	Coalition
Schleswig-Holstein	1971	51.9 (#1)	40 / 73	Majority
Thuringia	1999	51.0 (#1)	49 / 88	Majority

=== Results timeline ===
Year	(Germany) DE		(European Union) EU	(Baden-Württemberg) BW			(Bavaria) BY	(Berlin) BE	(Brandenburg) BB	(Bremen (state)) HB	(Hamburg) HH	(Hesse) HE	(Lower Saxony) NI	(Mecklenburg-Vorpommern) MV	(North Rhine-Westphalia) NW	(Rhineland-Palatinate) RP	(Saarland) SL	(Saxony) SN	(Saxony-Anhalt) ST	(Schleswig-Holstein) SH	(Thuringia) TH
Year	(West Germany) WD	(East Germany) DD	(European Union) EU	(Grand Duchy of Baden) SB	WB	(Württemberg-Hohenzollern) WH	(Bavaria) BY	(Berlin) BE	(Brandenburg) BB	(Bremen (state)) HB	(Hamburg) HH	(Hesse) HE	(Lower Saxony) NI	(Mecklenburg-Vorpommern) MV	(North Rhine-Westphalia) NW	(Rhineland-Palatinate) RP	(Saarland) SL	(Saxony) SN	(Saxony-Anhalt) ST	(Schleswig-Holstein) SH	(Thuringia) TH
1946	N/A	N/A	N/A		38.4		(Note: CSU operates as the sister party of the CDU in Bavaria)	22.7	30.3	18.9	26.7	31.0		34.1				23.3	21.8		18.9
1947	N/A	N/A	N/A	55.9		20.8	(Note: CSU operates as the sister party of the CDU in Bavaria)	22.7		▲22.0	26.7		19.1		37.6	47.2	N/A			34.0	
1948	N/A	N/A	N/A				(Note: CSU operates as the sister party of the CDU in Bavaria)	▼19.4		▲22.0	26.7						N/A			34.0	
1949	31.0	(Note: All East German Volkskammer elections bar that of 1990, as well as the 1950 East German state elections, were held on a non-competitive basis. Citizens could only vote for or against the "unity list" of the National Front of the GDR, which comprised the ruling SED and its subordinate bloc parties; these bloc parties included the East German section of the CDU.)	N/A				(Note: CSU operates as the sister party of the CDU in Bavaria)	▼19.4		▲22.0	▼34.5						N/A			34.0	
1950			N/A		▼26.3		(Note: CSU operates as the sister party of the CDU in Bavaria)	▲24.6		▲22.0	▼34.5	▼18.8			▼36.9		N/A			▼19.8	
1951			N/A		▼26.3		(Note: CSU operates as the sister party of the CDU in Bavaria)			▼9.0	▼34.5	▼18.8	▼23.7			▼39.2	N/A				
1952			N/A	36.0			(Note: CSU operates as the sister party of the CDU in Bavaria)		N/A		▼34.5	▼18.8	▼23.7	N/A			N/A	N/A	N/A		N/A
1953	▲45.2		N/A				(Note: CSU operates as the sister party of the CDU in Bavaria)		N/A		▲**50.0**	▼18.8	▼23.7	N/A			N/A	N/A	N/A		N/A
1954			N/A				(Note: CSU operates as the sister party of the CDU in Bavaria)	▲30.4	N/A			▲24.1	▼23.7	N/A	▲41.3		N/A	N/A	N/A	▲32.2	N/A
1955			N/A				(Note: CSU operates as the sister party of the CDU in Bavaria)		N/A	▲18.0			▲26.6	N/A		▲46.8	25.4	N/A	N/A		N/A
1956			N/A	▲42.6			(Note: CSU operates as the sister party of the CDU in Bavaria)		N/A					N/A				N/A	N/A		N/A
1957	▲50.2		N/A				(Note: CSU operates as the sister party of the CDU in Bavaria)		N/A		▼32.2			N/A				N/A	N/A		N/A
1958			N/A				(Note: CSU operates as the sister party of the CDU in Bavaria)	▲37.7	N/A		▼32.2	▲32.0		N/A	▲**50.5**			N/A	N/A	▲44.4	N/A
1959			N/A				(Note: CSU operates as the sister party of the CDU in Bavaria)		N/A	▼14.8	▼32.2	▲32.0	▲30.8	N/A		▲48.4		N/A	N/A		N/A
1960			N/A	▼39.5			(Note: CSU operates as the sister party of the CDU in Bavaria)		N/A	▼14.8	▼32.2	▲32.0	▲30.8	N/A			▼36.6	N/A	N/A		N/A
1961	▼45.3		N/A				(Note: CSU operates as the sister party of the CDU in Bavaria)		N/A	▼14.8	▼29.1	▲32.0	▲30.8	N/A				N/A	N/A		N/A
1962			N/A				(Note: CSU operates as the sister party of the CDU in Bavaria)		N/A	▼14.8	▼29.1	▼28.8	▲30.8	N/A	▼46.4			N/A	N/A	▲45.0	N/A
1963			N/A				(Note: CSU operates as the sister party of the CDU in Bavaria)	▼28.8	N/A	▲28.9	▼29.1	▼28.8	▲37.7	N/A		▼44.4		N/A	N/A		N/A
1964			N/A	▲46.2			(Note: CSU operates as the sister party of the CDU in Bavaria)	▼28.8	N/A	▲28.9	▼29.1	▼28.8	▲37.7	N/A				N/A	N/A		N/A
1965	▲47.6		N/A				(Note: CSU operates as the sister party of the CDU in Bavaria)	▼28.8	N/A	▲28.9	▼29.1	▼28.8		N/A			▲42.7	N/A	N/A		N/A
1966			N/A				(Note: CSU operates as the sister party of the CDU in Bavaria)	▼28.8	N/A	▲28.9	▲30.0	▼26.4		N/A	▼42.8			N/A	N/A		N/A
1967			N/A				(Note: CSU operates as the sister party of the CDU in Bavaria)	▲32.9	N/A	▲29.5	▲30.0	▼26.4	▲41.7	N/A		▲46.7		N/A	N/A	▲46.0	N/A
1968			N/A	▼44.2			(Note: CSU operates as the sister party of the CDU in Bavaria)	▲32.9	N/A	▲29.5	▲30.0	▼26.4		N/A				N/A	N/A		N/A
1969	▼46.1		N/A				(Note: CSU operates as the sister party of the CDU in Bavaria)	▲32.9	N/A	▲29.5	▲30.0	▼26.4		N/A				N/A	N/A		N/A
1970	▼46.1		N/A				(Note: CSU operates as the sister party of the CDU in Bavaria)	▲32.9	N/A	▲29.5	▲32.8	▲39.7	▲45.7	N/A	▲46.3		▲47.8	N/A	N/A		N/A
1971	▼46.1		N/A				(Note: CSU operates as the sister party of the CDU in Bavaria)	▲38.2	N/A	▲31.6	▲32.8	▲39.7	▲45.7	N/A	▲46.3	▲50.0		N/A	N/A	▲**51.9**	N/A
1972	▼44.9		N/A	▲52.9			(Note: CSU operates as the sister party of the CDU in Bavaria)	▲38.2	N/A	▲31.6	▲32.8	▲39.7	▲45.7	N/A	▲46.3			N/A	N/A		N/A
1973	▼44.9		N/A				(Note: CSU operates as the sister party of the CDU in Bavaria)	▲38.2	N/A	▲31.6	▲32.8	▲39.7	▲45.7	N/A	▲46.3			N/A	N/A		N/A
1974	▼44.9		N/A				(Note: CSU operates as the sister party of the CDU in Bavaria)	▲38.2	N/A	▲31.6	▲40.6	▲47.3	▲48.8	N/A	▲46.3			N/A	N/A		N/A
1975	▼44.9		N/A				(Note: CSU operates as the sister party of the CDU in Bavaria)	▲43.9	N/A	▲33.8	▲40.6	▲47.3	▲48.8	N/A	▲47.1	▲53.9	▲**49.1**	N/A	N/A	▼50.4	N/A
1976	▲48.6		N/A	▲**56.7**			(Note: CSU operates as the sister party of the CDU in Bavaria)	▲43.9	N/A	▲33.8	▲40.6	▲47.3		N/A	▲47.1			N/A	N/A		N/A
1977	▲48.6		N/A				(Note: CSU operates as the sister party of the CDU in Bavaria)	▲43.9	N/A	▲33.8	▲40.6	▲47.3		N/A	▲47.1			N/A	N/A		N/A
1978	▲48.6		N/A				(Note: CSU operates as the sister party of the CDU in Bavaria)	▲43.9	N/A	▲33.8	▼37.6	▼46.0	▼48.7	N/A	▲47.1			N/A	N/A		N/A
1979	▲48.6		**49.2**				(Note: CSU operates as the sister party of the CDU in Bavaria)	▲42.7	N/A	▼31.9	▼37.6	▼46.0		N/A	▲47.1	▼50.1		N/A	N/A	▼48.3	N/A
1980	▼44.5		**49.2**	▼53.4			(Note: CSU operates as the sister party of the CDU in Bavaria)	▲42.7	N/A	▼31.9	▼37.6	▼46.0		N/A	▼43.2		▼44.0	N/A	N/A		N/A
1981	▼44.5		**49.2**				(Note: CSU operates as the sister party of the CDU in Bavaria)	▲**48.0**	N/A	▼31.9	▼37.6	▼46.0		N/A	▼43.2			N/A	N/A		N/A
1982			**49.2**				(Note: CSU operates as the sister party of the CDU in Bavaria)		N/A	▼31.9	▲43.2	▼45.6	▲**50.7**	N/A	▼43.2			N/A	N/A		N/A
1982			**49.2**				(Note: CSU operates as the sister party of the CDU in Bavaria)		N/A	▼31.9	▼38.6	▼45.6	▲**50.7**	N/A	▼43.2			N/A	N/A		N/A
1983	▲48.8		**49.2**				(Note: CSU operates as the sister party of the CDU in Bavaria)		N/A	▲33.3	▼38.6	▼39.4		N/A	▼43.2	▲**51.9**		N/A	N/A	▲49.0	N/A
1984			▼46.0	▼51.9			(Note: CSU operates as the sister party of the CDU in Bavaria)		N/A	▲33.3	▼38.6	▼39.4		N/A	▼43.2			N/A	N/A		N/A
1985			▼46.0				(Note: CSU operates as the sister party of the CDU in Bavaria)	▼46.4	N/A	▲33.3	▼38.6	▼39.4		N/A	▼36.5		▼37.3	N/A	N/A		N/A
1986			▼46.0				(Note: CSU operates as the sister party of the CDU in Bavaria)		N/A	▲33.3	▲41.9	▼39.4	▼44.3	N/A	▼36.5		▼37.3	N/A	N/A		N/A
1987	▼44.3		▼46.0				(Note: CSU operates as the sister party of the CDU in Bavaria)		N/A	▼23.4	▼40.5	▲42.1		N/A	▼36.5	▼45.1	▼37.3	N/A	N/A	▼42.6	N/A
1988			▼46.0	▼49.0			(Note: CSU operates as the sister party of the CDU in Bavaria)		N/A	▼23.4	▼40.5			N/A	▼36.5		▼37.3	N/A	N/A	▼33.3	N/A
1989			▼37.7				(Note: CSU operates as the sister party of the CDU in Bavaria)	▼37.7	N/A	▼23.4	▼40.5			N/A	▼36.5		▼37.3	N/A	N/A	▼33.3	N/A
1990	▼43.8	48.0 (Note: Results for the Alliance for Germany)	▼37.7				(Note: CSU operates as the sister party of the CDU in Bavaria)	▲40.4	29.4	▼23.4	▼40.5		▼42.0	**38.3**	▲36.7		▼33.4	53.8	**39.0**	▼33.3	45.4
1991			▼37.7				(Note: CSU operates as the sister party of the CDU in Bavaria)		29.4	▲30.7	▼35.1	▼40.2	▼42.0		▲36.7	▼38.7	▼33.4			▼33.3	
1992			▼37.7	▼39.6			(Note: CSU operates as the sister party of the CDU in Bavaria)		29.4	▲30.7	▼35.1	▼40.2	▼42.0		▲36.7	▼38.7	▼33.4			▲33.8	
1993			▼37.7				(Note: CSU operates as the sister party of the CDU in Bavaria)		29.4	▲30.7	▼25.1	▼40.2	▼42.0		▲36.7	▼38.7	▼33.4			▲33.8	
1994	▼41.4		▲38.8				(Note: CSU operates as the sister party of the CDU in Bavaria)		▼18.7	▲30.7	▼25.1	▼40.2	▼36.4	▼37.7	▲36.7	▼38.7	▲38.6	▲**58.1**	▼34.4	▲33.8	▼42.6
1995			▲38.8				(Note: CSU operates as the sister party of the CDU in Bavaria)	▼37.4	▼18.7	▲32.6	▼25.1	▼39.2	▼36.4		▲37.7	▼38.7	▲38.6		▼34.4	▲33.8	
1996			▲38.8	▲41.3			(Note: CSU operates as the sister party of the CDU in Bavaria)		▼18.7		▼25.1	▼39.2	▼36.4		▲37.7	38.7	▲38.6		▼34.4	▲37.2	
1997			▲38.8				(Note: CSU operates as the sister party of the CDU in Bavaria)		▼18.7		▲30.7	▼39.2	▼36.4		▲37.7	38.7	▲38.6		▼34.4	▲37.2	
1998	▼35.1		▲38.8				(Note: CSU operates as the sister party of the CDU in Bavaria)		▼18.7		▲30.7	▼39.2	▼35.9	▼30.2	▲37.7	38.7	▲38.6		▼22.0	▲37.2	
1999	▼35.1		▲48.7				(Note: CSU operates as the sister party of the CDU in Bavaria)	▲40.8	▲**26.5**	▲**37.1**	▲30.7	▲43.4	▼35.9	▼30.2	▲37.7	38.7	▲45.5	▼56.9	▼22.0	▲37.2	▲**51.0**
2000	▼35.1		▲48.7				(Note: CSU operates as the sister party of the CDU in Bavaria)	▲40.8			▲30.7		▼35.9	▼30.2	▼37.0	38.7			▼22.0	▼35.2	
2001	▼35.1		▲48.7	▲44.8			(Note: CSU operates as the sister party of the CDU in Bavaria)				▼26.2		▼35.9	▼30.2	▼37.0	▼35.3			▼22.0	▼35.2	
2001	▼35.1		▲48.7	▲44.8			(Note: CSU operates as the sister party of the CDU in Bavaria)	▼23.8			▼26.2		▼35.9	▼30.2	▼37.0	▼35.3			▼22.0	▼35.2	
2002	▲38.5		▲48.7				(Note: CSU operates as the sister party of the CDU in Bavaria)	▼23.8					▼35.9	▲31.4	▼37.0	▼35.3			▲37.3	▼35.2	
2003	▲38.5		▲48.7				(Note: CSU operates as the sister party of the CDU in Bavaria)	▼23.8		▼29.8		▲**48.8**	▲48.3	▲31.4	▼37.0	▼35.3				▼35.2	
2004	▲38.5		▼44.5				(Note: CSU operates as the sister party of the CDU in Bavaria)	▼23.8	▼19.4		▲**47.2**			▲31.4	▼37.0	▼35.3	▲47.5	▼41.1		▼35.2	▼43.0
2005	▼35.2		▼44.5				(Note: CSU operates as the sister party of the CDU in Bavaria)	▼23.8						▲31.4	▲44.8	▼35.3				▲40.2	
2006			▼44.5	▼44.2			(Note: CSU operates as the sister party of the CDU in Bavaria)	▼21.3						▼28.8		▼32.8			▼36.2		
2007			▼44.5				(Note: CSU operates as the sister party of the CDU in Bavaria)	▼21.3		▼25.6						▼32.8					
2008			▼44.5				(Note: CSU operates as the sister party of the CDU in Bavaria)	▼21.3		▼25.6	▼42.6	▼36.8	▼42.5			▼32.8					
2009	▼33.8		▼37.9				(Note: CSU operates as the sister party of the CDU in Bavaria)	▼21.3	▲19.8	▼25.6		▲37.2				▼32.8	▼34.5	▼40.2		▼31.5	▼31.2
2010			▼37.9				(Note: CSU operates as the sister party of the CDU in Bavaria)	▼21.3	▲19.8	▼25.6					▼34.6	▼32.8					
2011			▼37.9	▼39.1			(Note: CSU operates as the sister party of the CDU in Bavaria)	▲23.3	▲19.8	▼20.4	▼21.9			▼23.0	▼34.6	▲35.2			▼32.5		
2012			▼37.9				(Note: CSU operates as the sister party of the CDU in Bavaria)		▲19.8	▼20.4	▼21.9				▼26.3	▲35.2	▲35.2			▼30.8	
2013	▲41.5		▼37.9				(Note: CSU operates as the sister party of the CDU in Bavaria)		▲19.8	▼20.4	▼21.9	▲38.3	▼36.0		▼26.3	▲35.2				▼30.8	
2014			▼35.4				(Note: CSU operates as the sister party of the CDU in Bavaria)		▲23.0	▼20.4	▼21.9		▼36.0		▼26.3	▲35.2		▼39.4		▼30.8	▲33.5
2015			▼35.4				(Note: CSU operates as the sister party of the CDU in Bavaria)		▲23.0	▲22.4	▼15.9		▼36.0		▼26.3	▲35.2				▼30.8	▲33.5
2016			▼35.4	▼27.0			(Note: CSU operates as the sister party of the CDU in Bavaria)	▼17.6	▲23.0	▲22.4	▼15.9		▼36.0	▼19.0	▼26.3	▼31.8			▼29.8	▼30.8	▲33.5
2017	▼32.9		▼35.4				(Note: CSU operates as the sister party of the CDU in Bavaria)	▼17.6	▲23.0	▲22.4	▼15.9		▼33.6		▲33.0	▼31.8	▲40.7			▲32.0	▲33.5
2018			▼35.4				(Note: CSU operates as the sister party of the CDU in Bavaria)	▼17.6	▲23.0	▲22.4	▼15.9	▼27.0				▼31.8					▲33.5
2019			▼28.9				(Note: CSU operates as the sister party of the CDU in Bavaria)	▼17.6	▼15.6	▲26.7	▼15.9					▼31.8		▼32.1			▼21.7
2020			▼28.9				(Note: CSU operates as the sister party of the CDU in Bavaria)	▼17.6		▲26.7	▼11.2					▼31.8					▼21.7
2021	▼24.1		▼28.9	▼24.1			(Note: CSU operates as the sister party of the CDU in Bavaria)	▲18.0		▲26.7	▼11.2			▼13.3		▼27.7			▲37.1		▼21.7
2022	▼24.1		▼28.9				(Note: CSU operates as the sister party of the CDU in Bavaria)	▲18.0		▲26.7	▼11.2		▼28.1	▼13.3	▲35.7	▼27.7	▼28.5			▲43.4	▼21.7
2023	▼24.1		▼28.9				(Note: CSU operates as the sister party of the CDU in Bavaria)	▲28.2		▼26.2	▼11.2	▲34.6	▼28.1	▼13.3		▼27.7	▼28.5				▼21.7
2024	▼24.1		▲30.0				(Note: CSU operates as the sister party of the CDU in Bavaria)		▼12.1	▼26.2	▼11.2		▼28.1	▼13.3		▼27.7	▼28.5	▼31.9			▲23.6
2025	▲28.5		▲30.0				(Note: CSU operates as the sister party of the CDU in Bavaria)		▼12.1	▼26.2	▲19.8		▼28.1	▼13.3		▼27.7	▼28.5				
2026	▲28.5		▲30.0	▲29.7			(Note: CSU operates as the sister party of the CDU in Bavaria)	▼18.8		▼26.2	▲19.8		▼28.1	▼4.9		▲31.0	▼28.5		▼17.2		
Year	(Germany) DE		(European Union) EU	(Baden-Württemberg) BW			(Bavaria) BY	(Berlin) BE	(Brandenburg) BB	(Bremen (state)) HB	(Hamburg) HH	(Hesse) HE	(Lower Saxony) NI	(Mecklenburg-Vorpommern) MV	(North Rhine-Westphalia) NW	(Rhineland-Palatinate) RP	(Saarland) SL	(Saxony) SN	(Saxony-Anhalt) ST	(Schleswig-Holstein) SH	(Thuringia) TH
**Bold** indicates best result to date. Present in legislature (in opposition); Junior coalition partner Senior coalition partner or majority government

== See also ==
- Archive for Christian Democratic Policy
- List of Christian democratic parties
- List of political parties in Germany
- Merkel-Raute, the signature gesture of Angela Merkel which is prominently featured in the CDU's campaign for the 2013 German federal election
- Party finance in Germany
- People's party (Volkspartei)
