= Leader of the Christian Democratic Union =

Most senior politician of the Christian Democratic Union of Germany

- Vorsitzender der Christlich Demokratischen Union

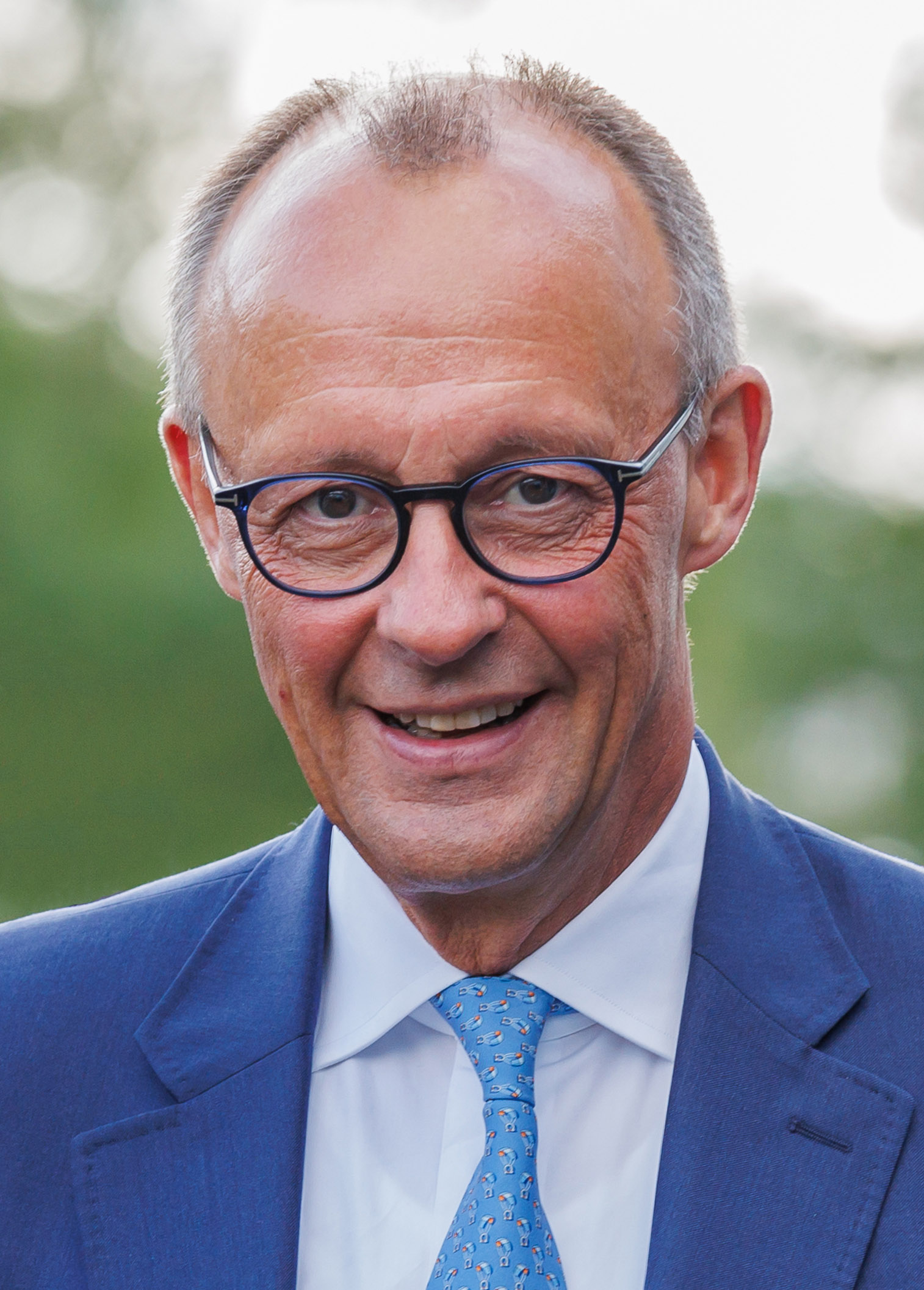
- Incumbent; Friedrich Merz since 31 January 2022
- Type: 1029
- Member of: Federal Executive Presidium
- Seat: Konrad-Adenauer-Haus
- Formation: 1 March 1946
- First holder: Konrad Adenauer
- Website: https://www.cdu.de/ueber-uns/struktur-der-cdu

The leader of the Christian Democratic Union (Vorsitzender der Christlich Demokratischen Union) is the most senior political figure within the Christian Democratic Union of Germany. Since 31 January 2022, the office has been held by Friedrich Merz, who succeeded Armin Laschet.

The Leader of the Christian Democratic Union Party is supported by a General Secretary who, since 12 July 2023, has been Carsten Linnemann.

== List of leaders of the Christian Democratic Union (1946–present) ==
A list of leaders since 1946:

	Portrait	Name (Born–Died) Home State	Leadership			Chancellor
	Portrait	Name (Born–Died) Home State	Term	Tenure	Elections	Chancellor
1		Konrad Adenauer (1876–1967); North Rhine-Westphalia	1 March 1946 – 23 March 1966	20 years, 22 days	1949; 1953; 1957; 1961	Konrad; Adenauer (1949-63)
1		Konrad Adenauer (1876–1967); North Rhine-Westphalia	1 March 1946 – 23 March 1966	20 years, 22 days	1949; 1953; 1957; 1961	Ludwig; Erhard (1963-66)
2		Ludwig Erhard (Note: There is uncertainty over the question whether Erhard was ever actually a member of the CDU. Reports at the time suggested that he joined the party when he became chairman, although his membership was backdated by three years. However, reports in 2007 suggested that Erhard never actually joined the CDU. The Konrad Adenauer Foundation, which holds the party archives, reported that the question could "not be answered conclusively.") (1897–1977); Baden-Württemberg	23 March 1966 – 23 May 1967	1 year, 61 days	1965	Ludwig; Erhard (1963-66)
2		Ludwig Erhard (1897–1977); Baden-Württemberg	23 March 1966 – 23 May 1967	1 year, 61 days	1965	Kurt Georg; Kiesinger (1966-69)
3		Kurt Georg Kiesinger (1904–1988); Baden-Württemberg	23 May 1967 – 5 October 1971	4 years, 135 days	1969	Kurt Georg; Kiesinger (1966-69)
3		Kurt Georg Kiesinger (1904–1988); Baden-Württemberg	23 May 1967 – 5 October 1971	4 years, 135 days	1969	Willy; Brandt (1969-74)
4		Rainer Barzel (1924–2006); North Rhine-Westphalia	5 October 1971 – 12 June 1973	1 year, 250 days	1972	Willy; Brandt (1969-74)
5		Helmut Kohl (1930–2017); Rhineland-Palatinate	12 June 1973 – 7 November 1998	25 years, 148 days	1976; 1980 (Note: Kohl opted not to seek the nomination as chancellor candidate due to internal criticism, instead nominated Lower Saxony premier Ernst Albrecht, who went on to lose the nomination to Bavaria premier and CSU leader Franz Josef Strauss.)	Willy; Brandt (1969-74)
5		Helmut Kohl (1930–2017); Rhineland-Palatinate	12 June 1973 – 7 November 1998	25 years, 148 days	1976; 1980	Helmut; Schmidt (1974-82)
5		Helmut Kohl (1930–2017); Rhineland-Palatinate	12 June 1973 – 7 November 1998	25 years, 148 days	1983; 1987; 1990; 1994	Helmut; Kohl (1982-98)
6		Wolfgang Schäuble (1942–2023); Baden-Württemberg	7 November 1998 – 16 February 2000	1 year, 101 days	1998	Gerhard; Schröder (1998-2005)|
7		Angela Merkel (born 1954); Mecklenburg-Vorpommern	10 April 2000 – 7 December 2018	18 years, 241 days	2002 (Note: After being outmaneuvered, Merkel yield the nomination as the Union's Chancellor candidate to Bavaria premier and CSU leader Edmund Stoiber.)	Gerhard; Schröder (1998-2005)|
7		Angela Merkel (born 1954); Mecklenburg-Vorpommern	10 April 2000 – 7 December 2018	18 years, 241 days	2005; 2009; 2013; 2017	Angela; Merkel (2005-21)|
8		Annegret Kramp-Karrenbauer (born 1962); Saarland	7 December 2018 – 22 January 2021	2 years, 46 days		Angela; Merkel (2005-21)|
9		Armin Laschet (born 1961); North Rhine-Westphalia	22 January 2021 – 22 January 2022	1 year, 0 days	2021	Angela; Merkel (2005-21)|
9		Armin Laschet (born 1961); North Rhine-Westphalia	22 January 2021 – 22 January 2022	1 year, 0 days	2021	Olaf; Scholz (2021-25)|
10		Friedrich Merz (born 1955); North Rhine-Westphalia	since 31 January 2022	4 years, 275 days	2025	Olaf; Scholz (2021-25)|
10		Friedrich Merz (born 1955); North Rhine-Westphalia	since 31 January 2022	4 years, 275 days	2025	Friedrich; Merz (since 2025)

== See also ==
- Social Democratic Party of Germany (SPD)
- Christian Social Union of Germany (CSU)
- Alliance '90/The Greens
