= Composition of the German state parliaments =

Germany's federal system comprises 16 state parliaments (the German terms are Landtag in large states, Bürgerschaft in Bremen and Hamburg, and Abgeordnetenhaus in Berlin), each including directly elected representatives.

== Parties in each parliament ==
Composition of each state's governing coalition

Composition of each state parliament

In the table below, the parties forming part of the state government are shaded and the party of the head of government is also in bold.

State	Seats (Majority)	CDU/CSU	SPD	AfD	Greens	The Left	FW	FDP	BSW	Others	Last election	Next election
Baden-Württemberg	**157** (79)	56	10	35	**56**	-	-	-	-	-	2026	2031
Bavaria	**203** (102)	**85**	17	32	32	-	37	-	-	-	2023	2028
Berlin	**153** (77)	**33**	21	29	25	45	-	-	-	-	2026	2031
Brandenburg	**88** (45)	12	**34**	30	-	-	-	-	8	3 (WfB); 1 (Ind.)	2024	2029
Bremen	**87** (44)	24	**28**	1	10	10	-	5	-	6 (BD); 3 (Ind.)	2023	2027
Hamburg	**121** (61)	26	**45**	10	25	15	-	-	-	-	2025	2030
Hesse	**133** (67)	**52**	23	25	22	-	-	8	-	3 (Ind.)	2023	2028
Lower Saxony	**146** (74)	47	**57**	17	24	-	-	-	-	1 (WU)	2022	2027
Mecklenburg-Vorpommern	**71** (36)	-	**29**	32	5	5	-	-	-	-	2026	2031
North Rhine-Westphalia	**195** (98)	**76**	56	12	39	-	-	12	-	-	2022	2027
Rhineland-Palatinate	**105** (53)	**39**	32	24	10	-	-	-	-	-	2026	2031
Saarland	**51** (26)	19	**29**	3	-	-	-	-	-	-	2022	2027
Saxony	**120** (61)	**41**	10	40	7	6	-	-	14	2 (Ind.)	2024	2029
Saxony-Anhalt	**83** (42)	**15**	8	39	8	8	-	-	5	-	2026	2031
Schleswig-Holstein	**69** (35)	**34**	12	-	14	-	-	5	-	4 (SSW)	2022	2027
Thuringia	**88** (45)	**23**	6	32	-	12	-	-	2	10 (ThG)	2024	2029
Thuringia	**88** (45)	**23**	6	32	-	12	-	-	2	3 (DSZ)	2024	2029
Total	1,870	582 (31.1%)	417 (22.3%)	361 (19.3%)	277 (14.8%)	101 (5.4%)	37 (2.0%)	30 (1.6%)	29 (1.6%)	36 (1.9%)		

== Diagrams ==
Baden-Württemberg

Bavaria

Berlin

Brandenburg

Bremen

Hamburg

Hesse

Lower Saxony

Mecklenburg-Vorpommern

North Rhine-Westphalia

Rhineland-Palatinate

Saarland

Saxony

Saxony-Anhalt

Schleswig-Holstein

Thuringia

== See also ==
- List of current heads of government of the German federal states
- Minister president (Germany)
- Politics of Germany
- Federalism in Germany
- States of Germany
