= Next Thuringian state election =

State election in Germany

- 2029

All 88 seats in the Landtag of Thuringia 45 seats needed for a majority
Party	AfD	CDU	BSW
Last election	32 seats, 32.8%	23 seats, 23.6%	15 seats, 15.8%
Current seats	32	23	2
Party	Left	SPD	TG
Last election	12 seats, 13.1%	6 seats, 6.1%	Did not exist
Current seats	12	6	9
Incumbent Government
Voigt cabinet
CDU–TG–SPD

The next election to the Landtag of Thuringia is scheduled for 2029.

== Background ==
In the 2024 Thuringian state election, the AfD, led by Björn Höcke, became the first far-right party in Germany since the Nazi Party to win a plurality of seats in a state election. However, Mario Voigt from the CDU was elected Minister-President on the first ballot with 51 votes in favor, 33 votes against, and 4 abstentions. His party formed a minority coalition with the SPD and the BSW, referred to in the media as a "blackberry coalition". To achieve confirmation and reach the necessary majority, the Left – which positioned itself as "constructive opposition" – provided some of the votes in favor. Following the early 2026 collapse of the SPD–BSW fourth Woidke cabinet in Brandenburg due to several BSW MdLs leaving the party, this was the only coalition involving the BSW in any state.

=== Coalition crisis and constructive votes of no confidence ===
In January 2026, TU Chemnitz revoked Voigt's doctorate degree after confirming allegations that part of his dissertation was plagiarized. The AfD filed a constructive vote of no confidence in response with Höcke as the proposed Minister-President, which failed with 33 votes out of the necessary 45 in favor.

In August, after Voigt's appeal against the revocation was denied, Höcke proposed another constructive vote of no confidence but with Sahra Wagenknecht as the Minister-President candidate instead. The AfD and BSW would have a majority together, and Wagenknecht previously stated that the BSW should support a potential AfD government under an independent Minister-President if her party enters the Landtag of Saxony-Anhalt at the 2026 election. She called the proposal "neither honest nor serious" but added that Voigt had lost trust and the state party should revoke its support.

On 17 August, two BSW MdLs, Anke Wirsing and Sven Küntzel, released a statement that they had lost confidence in Voigt. With the presence of the Left working with the government as a constructive opposition, this did not itself bring down the government. Wagenknecht again called for the end of the coalition and the installation of an independent Minister-President who would work with all parties. State party leader Katja Wolf criticized Wagenknecht and federal BSW leadership for carrying out "intentional destabilization" of the coalition, which she said was working quietly and constructively together.

On 19 August, the AfD formally proposed the second constructive vote of no confidence – once again with Höcke as the replacement candidate – to be voted on in a special session on 28 August. The vote once again failed with 33 votes in favor, 49 against, 3 abstaining, 2 invalid ballots and 1 absent.

On 2 September, three BSW MdLs – Dirk Hoffmeister, Roberto Kobel and Stefan Wogawa – left the party and formed their own parliamentary group Your Vote Counts. The three stated that continuing parliamentary work was impossible within the shadow of what they called an "ever-crazier federal leadership". Höcke told the press his party would move to dissolve the Landtag and hold a snap election, though doing so would require a two-thirds majority vote.

This was followed by ten additional BSW MdLs, including Wolf, leaving the party on 4 September along with nearly all of the state executive committee. In a press conference, Wolf said "we were not elected to flirt with right-wing radicals", referring to Wagenknecht's increased public pressure for her party to end its participation in the coalition and the long-standing firewall policy and work with the AfD. They founded the new party Thuringia.Just (TG) on 10 September and continued supporting the government. Anke Wirsing and Sven Küntzel remained in the BSW and form a rump parliamentary group, which is now in the opposition.

The AfD motion to dissolve the Landtag was voted down on 7 October with 34 yes votes and 52 no votes; a two-thirds majority of 59 votes was required and only the AfD bloc and Wirsing and Küntzel voted for it. Before the special session to vote on the motion, Voigt announced he would be withdrawing a lawsuit against TU Chemnitz, thus ending all efforts to have his doctoral degree restored.

== Opinion polls ==
=== Graphical summary ===
Curve of the polling for the 2029 Thuringian State Election

=== Party polling ===
Polling firm	Fieldwork date	Sample size	AfD	CDU	BSW	Linke	SPD	Grüne	FDP	TG	Others	Lead
INSA	20–27 Oct 2026	1,000	40	18	5	17	8	4	–	2	6	22
INSA	23–30 Jun 2026	1,000	40	22	7	16	6	4	–	–	5	18
INSA	27 Mar – 7 Apr 2026	1,000	39	24	7	14	6	3	–	–	7	15
INSA	27 Jan – 2 Feb 2026	1,000	38	24	7	14	7	3	–	–	7	14
INSA	2–9 Dec 2025	1,000	39	24	7	14	6	3	–	–	7	15
INSA	2–9 Sep 2025	1,000	37	25	9	14	7	3	–	–	5	12
INSA	29 Apr – 6 May 2025	1,000	35	24	11	14	8	3	–	–	5	11
2025 federal election	23 Feb 2025	–	38.6	18.6	9.4	15.2	8.8	4.2	2.8	–	–	20.0
INSA	27 Jan – 3 Feb 2025	1,000	35	25	13	11	7	4	–	–	5	10
INSA	2–9 Dec 2024	1,000	34	25	14	12	7	4	–	–	4	9
INSA	28 Nov – 4 Dec 2024	1,000	34	25	14	13	6	–	–	–	8	9
2024 state election	1 Sep 2024	–	32.8	23.6	15.8	13.1	6.1	3.2	1.1	–	4.3	9.2

=== Minister-President polling ===
Polling firm	Fieldwork date	Sample size					Other/Don't know	Lead
Polling firm	Fieldwork date	Sample size	Höcke AfD	Voigt CDU	Wolf TG	Maier SPD	Other/Don't know	Lead
INSA	27 Mar – 7 Apr 2026	1,000	20	18	9 (Note: Polled as a member of the BSW. She left the party in September 2026 and formed her own party Thüringen.Gerecht.)	6	47	2
INSA	27 Jan – 3 Feb 2025	1,000	21	26	—	—	43	5

== See also ==
- 1929 Thuringian state election
