= Minister president (Germany) =

Head of state and government in thirteen of Germany's sixteen states

The minister-president (German: Ministerpräsident, pronounced [miˈnɪstɐpʁɛziˌdɛnt]), sometimes referred to in English as the State Premier (Note: This usage is particularly common in Canadian and Australian sources, as these countries are also federal parliamentary systems where the provincial/state-level head of government is called "Premier".), is the head of government in thirteen of Germany's sixteen states.

In Berlin, the Free Hanseatic City of Bremen, and the Free and Hanseatic City of Hamburg, the heads of government hold different titles:

- in Berlin, Governing Mayor (Regierender Bürgermeister) (before 1951 Mayor/Bürgermeister)
- in Bremen, President of the Senate (Präsident des Senats)
- in Hamburg, First Mayor (Erster Bürgermeister).

In the former states of Baden and Württemberg-Hohenzollern, defunct since 1952, the heads of government held the title State President (Staatspräsident).

Nevertheless, in Germany, it is common to refer to all sixteen heads of the states as minister-presidents when they are referred to collectively. For example, the regular meetings of the sixteen office-holders are called Conference of minister-presidents (Ministerpräsidentenkonferenz).

== Constitutional roles and powers ==
As the German constitution (Basic Law) defines the Federal Republic of Germany as a federation, each German state enjoys sovereignty, limited only by the Basic Law. The Basic Law gives the states a broad discretion to determine their respective state structure, only stating that each German state has to be a social and democratic republic under the rule of law (Article 28.1). In practice all German states have adopted some form of a mixed parliamentary republican system: Despite some differences between the individual state constitutions, the minister-presidents have both typical powers of an executive leader (for example appointing and dismissing cabinet members or defining the political guidelines of the cabinet) and typical powers and functions of a head of state (for example the power to grant pardons on behalf of the state and to perform certain ceremonial duties). As such, their powers and functions resemble those of an executive president, but in contrast to a presidential system, they are not directly elected and depend on the confidence of the respective state parliament. Thus, the constitutional position of a minister-president differs from that of the Chancellor of Germany at the federal level, who only holds the role of a chief executive leader, while the President of Germany performs the more ceremonial powers and functions of the federal head of state.

Even though all sixteen Minister-presidents hold roughly the same position in their states, there are also some important differences between the provisions of the state constitutions with regard to the head of state and government. This begins with the election procedure: All Minister-presidents are elected by the state parliament, but while in some states a majority of parliament members is needed for a successful election, in other states a simple majority (a plurality of votes cast) is sufficient. The same goes for recall procedures: In some states, the parliament may simply vote an officeholder out of office, while in other states the parliament has to elect a new officeholder at the same time (Constructive vote of no confidence). In Bavaria, the constitution does not allow a recall of the minister-president at all. In fifteen states, the state constitution defines the minister-president as the leader of the cabinet, giving them the right, to determine the cabinet's political guidelines, but this is not the case in Bremen, where the President of the Senate only has a ceremonial precedence over the other cabinet members. The power of the minister-president to shape the cabinet also varies: Some states allow the office-holder complete discretion in appointing or dismissing cabinet ministers, while others impose limits. The constitution of Bremen does not grant the President of the Senate any direct influence over the cabinet's composition.

| State | Title | Election threshold | Recall procedure | Position in cabinet | Power to shape the cabinet | Right to grant pardon | Minimum age | Other provisions |
|---|---|---|---|---|---|---|---|---|
| Baden-Württemberg | Minister-president | majority of members | constructive vote of no confidence | guideline competence | limited (cabinet appointments subject to parliamentary approval, the state parliament may recall individual cabinet ministers with a two-thirds majority) | yes | 35 | |
| Free State of Bavaria | Minister-president | simple majority | none | guideline competence | limited (cabinet appointments subject to parliamentary approval) | yes | 40 | |
| Berlin | Governing Mayor | simple majority | vote of no confidence (if the state parliament does not elect a new Governing Mayor within 21 days, the former officeholder is reinvested automatically) | guideline competence | full | no (whole cabinet) | 18 (de facto) | |
| Brandenburg | Minister-President | majority of members (first and second ballot), plurality (third ballot) | constructive vote of no confidence | guideline competence | full | yes | 18 (de facto) | |
| Bremen | President of the Senate and Mayor | simple majority | constructive vote of no confidence | ceremonial precedence | none (the parliament elects and dismisses all cabinet members) | no (whole cabinet) | 18 | may not be a member of the state parliament |
| Hamburg | First Mayor and President of the Senate | majority of members | constructive vote of no confidence | guideline competence | limited (cabinet appointments subject to parliamentary approval) | no (whole cabinet) | 18 | may not be a member of the state parliament |
| Hesse | Minister-president | majority of members | vote of no confidence | guideline competence | limited (dismissal of cabinet members subject to parliamentary approval) | yes | 18 (de facto) | members of noble houses, which have reigned in Germany before 1918, are ineligible for office |
| Lower Saxony | Minister-president | majority of members or plurality, if the state parliament does not elect a minister-president in 21 days and does not dissolve itself thereupon | constructive vote of no confidence | guideline competence | limited (cabinet appointments subject to parliamentary approval) | yes | 18 (de facto) | |
| Mecklenburg-Vorpommern | Minister-president | majority of members or plurality, if the state parliament does not elect a minister-president in 28 days and does not dissolve itself thereupon | constructive vote of no confidence | guideline competence | full | yes | 18 (de facto) | |
| North Rhine-Westphalia | Minister-President | majority of members (first ballot), simple majority (second and third ballot), runoff (fourth ballot) | constructive vote of no confidence | guideline competence | full | yes | 18 | has to be a member of the state parliament |
| Rhineland-Palatinate | Minister-president | majority of members | vote of no confidence | guideline competence | full | yes | 18 (de facto) | |
| Saarland | Minister-president | majority of members | vote of no confidence | guideline competence | limited (cabinet appointments and dismissals subject to parliamentary approval) | no (whole cabinet) | 18 (de facto) | |
| Free State of Saxony | Minister-president | majority of members (first ballot), simple majority (following ballots) | constructive vote of no confidence | guideline competence | full | yes | 18 (de facto) | |
| Saxony-Anhalt | Minister-president | majority of members or simple majority, if the state parliament does not elect a minister-president in 14 days and does not dissolve itself thereupon | constructive vote of no confidence | guideline competence | full | yes | 18 (de facto) | |
| Schleswig-Holstein | Minister-president | majority of members (first and second ballot), plurality (third ballot) | constructive vote of no confidence | guideline competence | full | yes | 18 (de facto) | |
| Free State of Thuringia | Minister-president | majority of members (first and second ballot), plurality (third ballot) | constructive vote of no confidence | guideline competence | full | yes | 18 (de facto) | |

By virtue of their position in the Bundesrat, the minister-presidents can exert considerable influence on national politics within the federal structure. Along with several of their ministers, they commonly represent their state in the Bundesrat (the German Federal Council). Each state government is represented in the Bundesrat by three to six delegates, depending on the state's population.

== List of current minister-presidents ==
Map of the governing coalitions of the German states

The longest-serving incumbent head of government of a German state is Dietmar Woidke, who has served as the Minister-President of Brandenburg since 28 August 2013. Gordon Schnieder, the Minister-President of Rhineland-Palatinate since 18 May 2026, is the shortest-serving incumbent.

| State | Portrait | Head of government (Note: All heads of government are styled "Minister-President" unless otherwise indicated.) Date of birth | Party | Took office | Time in office | Last election | Next election | Current cabinet | Former office-holders |
|---|---|---|---|---|---|---|---|---|---|
| Baden-Württemberg | | Cem Özdemir; 21 December 1965 (age 60) | Greens | 13 May 2026 | 187 days | 2026 | 2031 | Özdemir | List |
| Bavaria | | Markus Söder; 5 January 1967 (age 59) | CSU | 16 March 2018 | 8 years, 245 days | 2023 | 2028 | Söder III | List |
| Berlin | | Governing Mayor; Kai Wegner; 15 September 1972 (age 54) | CDU | 27 April 2023 | 3 years, 203 days | 2026 | 2031 | Wegner | List |
| Brandenburg | | Dietmar Woidke; 22 October 1961 (age 65) | SPD | 28 August 2013 | 13 years, 80 days | 2024 | 2029 | Woidke IV/V | List |
| Bremen | | President of the Senate and Mayor; Andreas Bovenschulte; 11 August 1965 (age 61) | SPD | 15 August 2019 | 7 years, 93 days | 2023 | 2027 | Bovenschulte II | List |
| Hamburg | | First Mayor; Peter Tschentscher; 20 January 1966 (age 60) | SPD | 28 March 2018 | 8 years, 233 days | 2025 | 2030 | Tschentscher III | List |
| Hesse | | Boris Rhein; 2 January 1972 (age 54) | CDU | 31 May 2022 | 4 years, 169 days | 2023 | 2028 | Rhein II | List |
| Lower Saxony | | Olaf Lies; 8 May 1967 (age 59) | SPD | 20 May 2025 | 1 year, 180 days | 2022 | 2027 | Lies | List |
| Mecklenburg-Vorpommern | | Manuela Schwesig; 23 May 1974 (age 52) | SPD | 4 July 2017 | 9 years, 135 days | 2026 | 2031 | Schwesig III | List |
| North Rhine-Westphalia | | Hendrik Wüst; 19 July 1975 (age 51) | CDU | 27 October 2021 | 5 years, 20 days | 2022 | 2027 | Wüst II | List |
| Rhineland-Palatinate | | Gordon Schnieder; 8 July 1975 (age 51) | CDU | 18 May 2026 | 182 days | 2026 | 2031 | Schnieder | List |
| Saarland | | Anke Rehlinger; 6 April 1976 (age 50) | SPD | 25 April 2022 | 4 years, 205 days | 2022 | 2027 | Rehlinger | List |
| Saxony | | Michael Kretschmer; 7 May 1975 (age 51) | CDU | 13 December 2017 | 8 years, 338 days | 2024 | 2029 | Kretschmer III | List |
| Saxony-Anhalt | | Sven Schulze; 31 July 1979 (age 47) | CDU | 28 January 2026 | 292 days | 2026 | 2031 | Schulze | List |
| Schleswig-Holstein | | Daniel Günther; 24 July 1973 (age 53) | CDU | 28 June 2017 | 9 years, 141 days | 2022 | 2027 | Günther II | List |
| Thuringia | | Mario Voigt; 8 February 1977 (age 49) | CDU | 12 December 2024 | 1 year, 339 days | 2024 | 2029 | Voigt | List |

== Deputies ==
The Minister-presidents appoint one member of their cabinet as their deputy. In most states the deputy of the minister-president holds the title Deputy Minister-president (Stellvertreter des Ministerpräsidenten), in Berlin Mayor, in Bremen Deputy President of the Senate and in Hamburg Second Mayor. In some states, the state constitution allows for the optional oppointment of more than one deputy. This option is used sometimes in coalition governments with more than two parties, although in this case a hierarchy is usually defined between the deputies (first and second deputy minster-president or, in Bavaria, deputy minister-president and additional deputy minister-president) in order to avoid any confusion should it actually become necessary for the Minister-president to be temporarily stood in for. Berlin is a special case, as the state constitution there requires the appointment of two equally ranking deputies.

Their duties and functions mirror roughly those of the vice chancellor of Germany on federal level. Most importantly, the deputy minister-president (or equivalent) temporarily act as Minister-president in case of the office-holder's death or incapacity until the end of the incapacity or the election of a successor by the state parliament. An exception to this are the regulations in the state constitution of Bavaria (Art. 44.3), which designates both the deputy minister-president (for internal affairs) and the President of the Landtag (for the external representation) as acting successors. Minister-presidents leaving office normally stay in office as acting minister-presidents (or equivalent) themselves until a successor is elected. This is however not the case, if the reason for the resignation is some form of constitutional, legal or traditional incompatibility with an office, on which the resigning office-holder has entered: The Basic Law prohibits the President of Germany from holding office in a state government at the same time (Art. 55.1). According to the Federal Constitutional Court Act, the same applies to judges on the Federal Constitutional Court (§ 3.3). Simultaneous membership in the Bundestag or the federal government is not prohibited for a minister-president (or other members of a state government) under federal law, but in some states (for example North Rhine-Westphalia) it is forbidden by state law and generally it is not considered to be in line with political convention. Therefore, office-holders elected or appointed to such office usually resign and refrain from continuing to hold the office of minister-president on an acting basis, leaving that role to their deputy.

Normally, such full replacements last only a few days or even a few hours, but there have also been cases in which such acting Minister-presidents have had to remain in office for a longer period because the election of a new regular incumbent had proved difficult; this occurred for example in Schleswig-Holstein in 1987/88: The state election on 13 September 1987 had resulted in a stalemate between the centre-right bloc of CDU and FDP, which supported the incumbent Uwe Barschel, and the centre-left parties SPD and SSW, each with 37 seats. Due to the weak election results for the CDU and above all the Barschel affair, a supposed election-fraud scandal, Barschel declared his resignation with effect from 2 October and died a few days later in a hotel in Geneva under circumstances that have not been clarified to this day. As a result, the previous deputy Henning Schwarz became acting Minister-president. Attempts to elect a new Minister-president in the newly elected state parliament failed because of the stalemate, so the parliament dissolved itself and early state elections were held on 8 May 1988. The SPD emerged from these with an absolute majority of seats and its leading candidate Björn Engholm was elected Minister-president on 31 May. Schwarz thus held office as acting Minister-president for 242 days.

=== Current (first) deputy minister-presidents ===
| State | Title | Deputy | Party | Current cabinet |
|---|---|---|---|---|
| Baden-Württemberg | Deputy Minister-president | Manuel Hagel | CDU | Özdemir |
| Bavaria | Deputy Minister-president | Vacant | Free Voters | Söder III |
| Berlin | Mayor | Franziska Giffey | SPD | Wegner |
| Berlin | Mayor | Stefan Evers | CDU | Wegner |
| Brandenburg | Deputy Minister-president | Jan Redmann | CDU | Woidke V |
| Bremen | Deputy President of the Senate | Björn Fecker | Greens | Bovenschulte II |
| Hamburg | Second Mayor | Katharina Fegebank | Greens | Tschentscher III |
| Hesse | Deputy Minister-president | Kaweh Mansoori | SPD | Rhein II |
| Lower Saxony | Deputy Minister-president | Julia Hamburg | Greens | Lies |
| Mecklenburg-Vorpommern | First Deputy Minister-president | Kerstin Mieth | The Left | Schwesig III |
| North Rhine-Westphalia | Deputy Minister-president | Mona Neubaur | Greens | Wüst II |
| Rhineland-Palatine | Deputy Minister-president | Sabine Bätzing-Lichtenthäler | SPD | Schnieder |
| Saarland | Deputy Minister-president | Jürgen Barke | SPD | Rehlinger |
| Saxony | Deputy Minister-president | Petra Köpping | SPD | Kretschmer III |
| Saxony-Anhalt | First Deputy Minister-president | Armin Willingmann | SPD | Schulze |
| Schleswig-Holstein | Deputy Minister-president | Aminata Touré | Greens | Günther II |
| Thuringia | First Deputy Minister-president | Katja Wolf | Thüringen.Gerecht | Voigt |

=== Current second deputy minister-presidents ===
| State | Title | Deputy | Party | Current cabinet |
|---|---|---|---|---|
| Bavaria | Additional Deputy Minister-president | Ulrike Scharf | CSU | Söder III |
| Mecklenburg-Vorpommern | Second Deputy Minister-president | Claudia Müller | Alliance 90/The Greens | Schwesig III |
| Saxony-Anhalt | Second Deputy Minister-president | Lydia Hüskens | FDP | Schulze |
| Thuringia | Second Deputy Minister-president | Georg Maier | SPD | Voigt |

== Trivia ==
The office of a minister-president is both highly prestigious in its own right and acts as a potential "career springboard" for German politicians.

Three out of twelve presidents of Germany have been head of a state before becoming president:

- Richard von Weizsäcker, Governing Mayor of Berlin (1981–1984), President of Germany (1984–1994)
- Johannes Rau, Minister-President of North Rhine-Westphalia (1978–1998), President of Germany (1999–2004)
- Christian Wulff, Minister-President of Lower Saxony (2003–2010), President of Germany (2010–2012)

Five out of ten chancellors of Germany have been head of a state before becoming chancellor:

- Kurt-Georg Kiesinger, Minister-President of Baden-Württemberg (1958–1966), Chancellor of Germany (1966–1969)
- Willy Brandt, Governing Mayor of West-Berlin (1957–1966), Chancellor of Germany (1969–1974)
- Helmut Kohl, Minister-President of Rhineland-Palatinate (1969–1976), Chancellor of Germany (1982–1998)
- Gerhard Schröder, Minister-President of Lower Saxony (1990–1998), Chancellor of Germany (1998–2005)
- Olaf Scholz, First Mayor of Hamburg (2011–2018), Chancellor of Germany (2021–2025)

Many more minister-presidents went on to become members of the federal government, EU institutions or judges of the Federal Constitutional Court of Germany for example.

The three longest serving office-holders were:

- Peter Altmeier, Minister-President of Rhineland-Palatinate (1947–1969, 21 years, 314 days)
- Franz-Josef Röder, Minister-President of Saarland (1959–1979, 20 years, 64 days)
- Wilhelm Kaisen, President of the Senate of Bremen (1945–1965, 19 years, 354 days)

The three shortest serving office-holders were:

- Thomas Kemmerich, Minister-President of Thuringia (2020, 28 days)
- Heinrich Welsch, Minister-President of Saarland (1955–1956, 73 days)
- Fritz Schäffer, Minister-President of Bavaria (1945, 123 days)

The three oldest living (sitting or former) office-holders are:

- Klaus von Dohnanyi (born 1928; First Mayor of Hamburg, 1981–1988)
- Henning Scherf (born 1938; President of the Senate of Bremen, 1995–2005)
- Björn Engholm (born 1939; Minister-President of Schleswig-Holstein, 1988–1993)

The three youngest living (sitting or former) office-holders are:

- Sven Schulze (born 1979; Minister-President of Saxony-Anhalt, since 2026)
- Franziska Giffey (born 3 May 1978; Governing Mayor of Berlin, 2021–2023)
- Tobias Hans (born 1 February 1978; Minister-President of Saarland, 2018–2022)

There have been eight female heads of a German state:

- Heide Simonis, Minister-President of Schleswig-Holstein (1993–2005)
- Christine Lieberknecht, Minister-President of Thuringia (2009–2014)
- Hannelore Kraft, Minister-President of North Rhine-Westphalia (2010–2017)
- Annegret Kramp-Karrenbauer, Minister-President of Saarland (2011–2018)
- Malu Dreyer, Minister-President of Rhineland-Palatinate (2013–2024)
- Manuela Schwesig, Minister-President of Mecklenburg-Vorpommern (incumbent since 2017)
- Franziska Giffey, Governing Mayor of Berlin (2021–2023)
- Anke Rehlinger, Minister-President of Saarland (incumbent since 2022)

One person has managed to become Minister-President of two different states, which did not merge into one another:

- Bernhard Vogel, Minister-President of Rhineland-Palatinate (1976–1988) and Minister-President of Thuringia (1992–2003)

Two persons have been minister-presidents of two states before and after they had merged into one another:

- Reinhold Maier, Minister-President of Württemberg-Baden (1945–1952), Minister-President of Baden-Württemberg (1952–1953)
- Gebhard Müller, State President of Württemberg-Hohenzollern (1948–1952), Minister-President of Baden-Württemberg (1953–1958)

The vast majority former minister-presidents have been members of Germany's two biggest political parties, the center-right CDU (or, in Bavaria, its sister party CSU) and the center-left SPD. However, several other parties (including all parties currently represented in the Bundestag, apart from the AfD) have at least once provided a minister-president.

Alliance 90/The Greens:

- Winfried Kretschmann, Minister-President of Baden-Württemberg (2011–2026)
- Cem Özdemir, Minister-President of Baden-Württemberg (since 2026)

Centre Party:

- Rudolf Amelunxen, Minister-President of North Rhine-Westphalia (1946–1947)

Christian People's Party of Saarland:

- Johannes Hoffmann, Minister-President of Saarland (1947–1955)

Free Democratic Party of Germany (FDP):

- Reinhold Maier, Minister-President of Württemberg-Baden (1945–1952), Minister-President of Baden-Württemberg (1952–1953)
- Thomas Kemmerich, Minister-President of Thuringia (2020)

German Party:

- Heinrich Hellwege, Minister-President of Lower Saxony (1955–1959)

The Left:

- Bodo Ramelow, Minister-President of Thuringia (2014–2020 and 2020–2024)

Three Minister-presidents were independent:

- Fritz Schäffer, Minister-President of Bavaria (1945)
- Karl Geiler, Minister-President of Hesse (1945–1946)
- Heinrich Welsch, Minister-President of Saarland (1955–1956)

== See also ==
- Ministerpräsident (Prussia)
