= Grand coalition (Germany) =

Term in German politics about coalition between SPD and CDU/CSU

In German politics, a grand coalition (German: Große Koalition [ˈɡʁoːsə koaliˈt͡si̯oːn], shortened to: Groko [ˈɡʁoːkoː]) is a governing coalition between the two parties with the most parliamentarians on federal or state level. The term is generally linked to a coalition between the centre-right CDU/CSU alliance (Union), consisting of the Christian Democratic Union (CDU) and the Christian Social Union of Bavaria (CSU) parties, and the centre-left Social Democratic Party (SPD), since they have historically been the major parties in most state and federal elections since 1949. The meaning of the term changed due to the growth of some formerly minor parties into the 2020s.

A grand coalition is the governing government of Germany under the Merz cabinet following the 2025 German federal election, and marks the first time that one of the two parties does not have the most or second most seats in the Bundestag; the far-right Alternative for Germany (AfD) won the second most seats. As a result, the latest coalition between CDU/CSU and SPD is often instead described as a black-red coalition, referring to the respective colours of the two blocs. If the coalition also includes the liberal Free Democratic Party (FDP), it is called a Germany coalition (Deutschland-Koalition), with the party colours matching the flag of Germany: black for CDU/CSU, red for SPD, and yellow for FDP.

== Weimar Republic (1919–1933) ==
In the Weimar Republic of 1919 to 1933, the term "Great Coalition" was used for a coalition that included the Social Democratic Party, the Catholic Centre Party and the liberal Democratic Party and People's Party. Such a coalition was in power in 1923 and from 1928 until 1930, although the latter was a conglomerate of parties with somewhat conflicting interests that banded together as a safeguard for democracy against the radical political parties, the Communist Party and the Nazi Party. In March 1930, the Great Coalition broke apart, with the resignation of the Social Democrats over the contentious issue of increasing employees' national insurance contributions at a time when wages were falling.

== Federal Republic (1949–present) ==
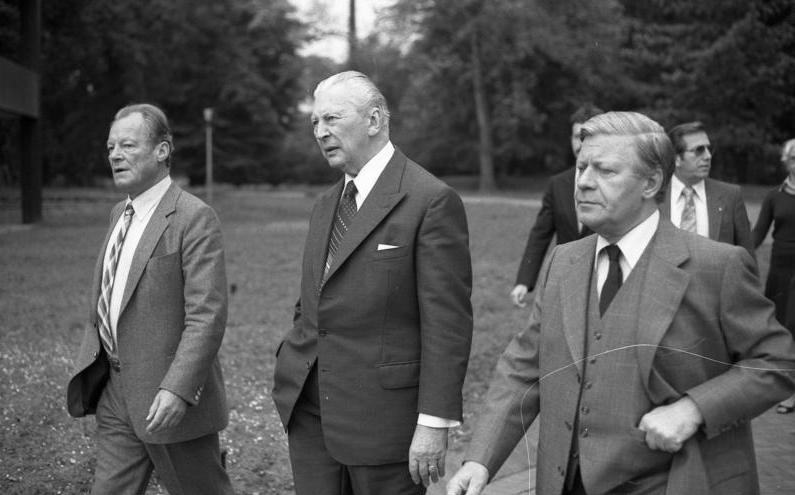
Ten years after their coalition: Willy Brandt (left) and Kurt Georg Kiesinger (center), with then Chancellor Helmut Schmidt (right)

=== Federal level ===
In the post-war politics of Germany, five grand coalitions have been formed at the federal level through the Bundestag.

==== Kiesinger cabinet (1966–1969) ====
On 1 December 1966, the government was formed by the Social Democratic Party of Germany and the Christian Democratic Union of Germany, the two major political parties in the Federal Republic of Germany. It was the result of arguments about tax increases between the CDU/CSU–FDP coalition of the time. The FDP ministers stood down and a new government was formed with the SPD under Kurt Georg Kiesinger of the CDU. The grand coalition was in control of 90% of the Bundestag (468 of 518 seats), leaving some politically active students disillusioned; this disillusionment led to the formation of the Außerparlamentarische Opposition which formed a core of the German student movement. The Kiesinger grand coalition lasted until 1969.

==== Merkel cabinets (2005–2009, 2013–2021) ====
After the inconclusive result of the 2005 German federal election, neither of the traditional coalitions could form a majority government. A larger centre-left coalition was possible, comprising the SPD, Greens, and the Party of Democratic Socialism (PDS); but the SPD desired to exclude the PDS, the successor party to East Germany's ruling Socialist Unity Party, from government (i.e. a cordon sanitaire). Consequently, the leaders of the SPD and the CDU/CSU agreed to form a grand coalition, with CDU leader Angela Merkel as chancellor and an equal number of cabinet seats for each party. The chancellor was elected on 22 November, and the 1st Merkel Cabinet took office. The grand coalition lasted until the 2009 federal election, when a coalition was agreed between the CDU/CSU and the FDP.

Following the 2013 election, a third grand coalition was formed by the CDU/CSU and the SPD. Again it would have been numerically possible to form a center-left government with the SPD, Greens, and The Left (the successor party to the PDS), but a grand coalition was formed instead. The term GroKo (shortening for Große Koalition) was named 2013 word of the year in Germany. After the 2017 election, the CDU/CSU initially entered talks with the FDP and Greens (a Jamaica coalition); however, negotiations failed, and the CDU/CSU and SPD ultimately agreed to a fourth grand coalition.

==== Merz cabinet (2025–present) ====
The Merz cabinet was signed in April 2025 thus marking a fifth time a coalition has happened between the CDU/CSU and the SPD despite the SPD becoming the third largest party in the Bundestag after the federal election held in February where the far-right Alternative for Germany (AfD) became the second largest party. Because the SPD had fallen to third place, some sources defined the coalition as a red–black coalition rather than the traditional grand coalition.

The Merz cabinet was formed in May 2025. Following the signing of the coalition agreement in April, Friedrich Merz was elected Chancellor on 6 May 2025. Notably, Merz failed to secure an absolute majority in the first ballot due to dissenting votes from within the coalition—a historic first for a West German or reunified German Chancellor. He was subsequently elected on the second ballot with 325 votes.

=== State level ===
Historically grand coalitions have been quite frequent at the state level. Currently, only two of the sixteen states have never been governed by a grand coalition: Hamburg and North Rhine-Westphalia. As of May 2026, five states are currently governed by a grand coalition:

- Berlin, the Wegner senate (since 27 April 2023) supported by the SPD and CDU
- Brandenburg, the fifth Woidke cabinet (since 18 March 2026), also supported by the SPD and CDU
- Hesse, the second Rhein cabinet (since 18 January 2024), another SPD–CDU partnership
- Rhineland-Palatinate, the Schnieder cabinet (since 18 May 2026)
- Saxony, the third Kretschmer cabinet (since 18 December 2024) is likewise a CDU–SPD tandem.

In Saxony-Anhalt, the third Haseloff cabinet (in office since September 2021) is supported by the CDU, SPD and FDP, the first "Germany coalition" in the country since December 1959, after the fifth Kaisen senate in Bremen was dissolved. In Thuringia, the Voigt cabinet (in office since December 2024) is any state's first-ever "blackberry coalition" among the CDU, SPD and newcomer Sahra Wagenknecht Alliance (Bündnis Sahra Wagenknecht, BSW).

== See also ==
- German governing coalition
- Historic Compromise (Italy)
- Kenya coalition (Grand coalition including the Greens)
- Grand coalition
- Roman/Red (Netherlands/Belgium)
- Uniparty
