= Katharina Schenk =

German politician (born 1988)

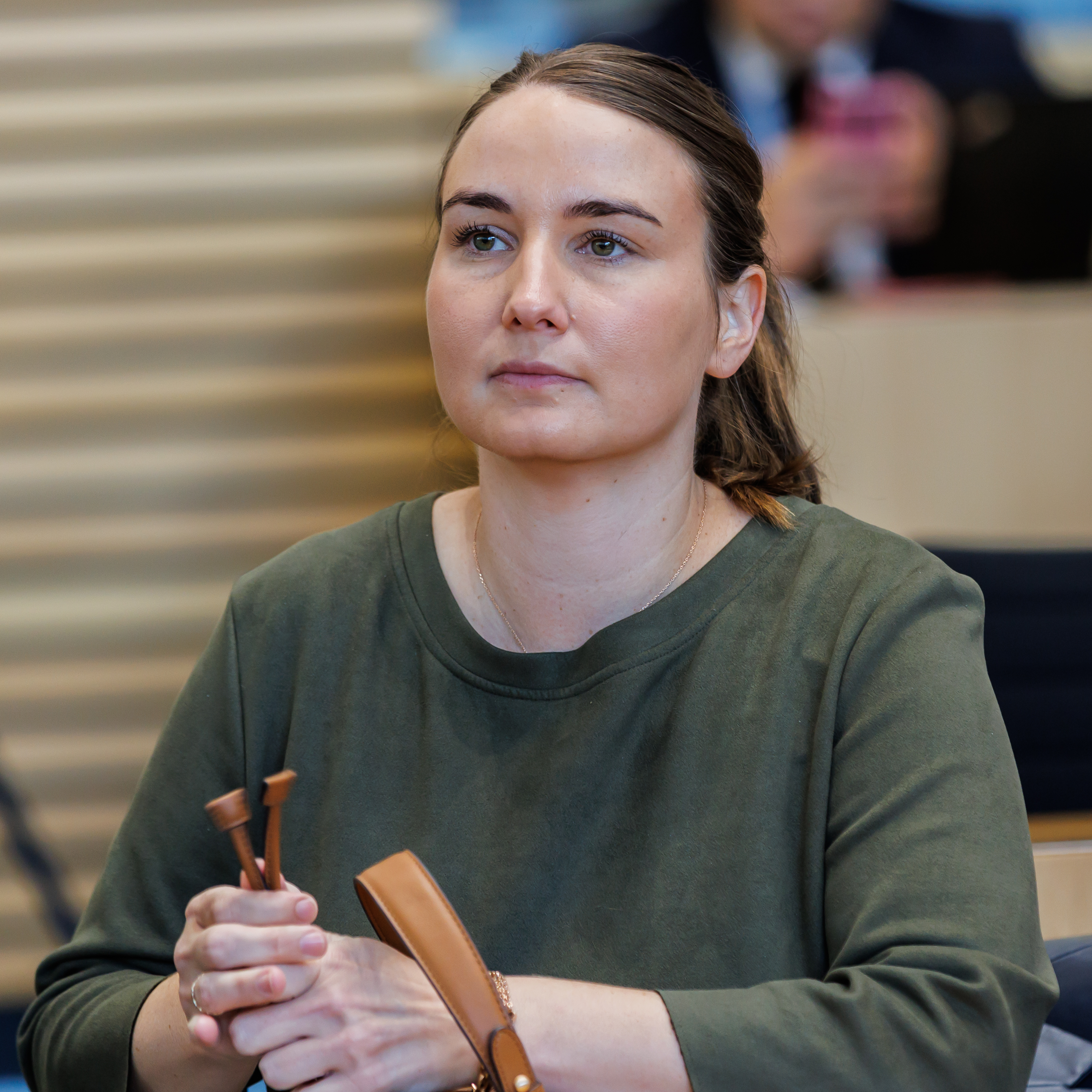
- Katharina Schenk in September 2024

Minister for Social Affairs, Health, Labour and Family of Thuringia
- Incumbent
- Assumed office 13 December 2024

Member of the Landtag of Thuringia
- In office 1 September 2024 – 28 February 2025
- Succeeded by: Moritz Kalthoff

Personal details
- Born: 23 January 1988 (age 38) Schkeuditz, Germany
- Party: SPD
- Education: Leipzig University

Katharina Schenk (born 23 January 1988) is a German politician from the Social Democratic Party (SPD). She has been Thuringia's Minister for Social Affairs, Health, Labour and Family since December 2024. Previously, she was State Secretary for Local Affairs in the Thuringian Ministry of the Interior and Local Government from March 2020 to September 2024. She has also been a member of the Landtag of Thuringia since 2024.

== Life ==
Between September 2007 and June 2010, Schenk completed a bachelor's degree in social sciences, political science and philosophy at the universities in Leipzig and Athens. Between September 2010 and June 2012, she completed a master's degree in philosophy at the University of Leipzig, before beginning a doctoral program in political philosophy (doctoral project "The Privatization of Happiness") there in April 2013 as a scholarship holder of the Friedrich Ebert Foundation.

From March 2013 to July 2017, Schenk worked as an editorial assistant at the Philosophy Magazine before becoming personal assistant to Altenburg's mayor Michael Wolf (SPD) in October 2017. After Wolf's term ended, she became city manager in the economic development department of the city of Altenburg in August 2018.

As a member of the Social Democratic Party of Germany, Schenk was elected to the Leipzig city council in 2014, where she remained until she left the city in early 2018. From 2014 to 2016 she was state chairwoman of the Young Socialists in the SPD in Saxony, and from 2015 to 2018 she was a member of the SPD state executive committee in Saxony. After moving to Altenburg in Thuringia, she ran for mayor of the city in April 2018, but only came third with 20.4 percent of the vote. From 2018 to 2022 she was district chairwoman of the SPD in Altenburger Land. There she was elected to the district council in 2019 and took over the chairmanship of the joint parliamentary group of the SPD and Alliance 90/The Greens until 2022.

In the course of the formation of the second Ramelow cabinet, Schenk was appointed State Secretary in the Thuringian Ministry of the Interior and Local Government by Minister Georg Maier at the beginning of March 2020. She succeeded Uwe Höhn, who had retired, and took over responsibility for local government. Since 2022, she has been chairwoman of the SPD district association in Gotha and deputy chairwoman of the SPD Thuringia. In the 2024 Thuringian state election, Schenk ran as a direct candidate in the Sömmerda I/Gotha III constituency and in 6th place on the SPD state list and received a mandate via the state list, which she accepted on 13 September 2024. She resigned from her post as State Secretary in the Thuringian Ministry of the Interior on the same day, as in Thuringia state secretaries are not allowed to be members of the state parliament at the same time.

On 13 December 2024, Schenk was appointed Thuringia's Minister for Social Affairs, Health, Labour and Family in the Voigt Cabinet.

Schenk is married, mother of two children and lives in Gotha.
