= Saale-Holzland-Kreis II =

Electoral constituency in Thuringia, Germany

Saale-Holzland-Kreis II is an electoral constituency (German: Wahlkreis) represented in the Landtag of Thuringia. It elects one member via first-past-the-post voting. Under the current constituency numbering system, it is designated as constituency 36. It covers the northern part of Saale-Holzland-Kreis.

Saale-Holzland-Kreis II was created for the 1994 state election. Since 2024, it has been represented by Wiebke Muhsal of Alternative for Germany (AfD).

== Geography ==
As of the 2019 state election, Saale-Holzland-Kreis II covers the northern part of Saale-Holzland-Kreis, specifically the municipalities of Albersdorf, Bad Klosterlausnitz, Bobeck, Bürgel, Crossen an der Elster, Dornburg-Camburg, Eisenberg, Frauenprießnitz, Golmsdorf, Gösen, Graitschen b. Bürgel, Großlöbichau, Hainichen, Hainspitz, Hartmannsdorf, Heideland, Jenalöbnitz, Lehesten, Löberschütz, Mertendorf, Nausnitz, Neuengönna, Petersberg, Poxdorf, Rauda, Rauschwitz, Scheiditz, Schkölen, Schlöben, Schöngleina, Serba, Silbitz, Tautenburg, Tautenhain, Thierschneck, Waldeck, Walpernhain, Weißenborn, Wichmar, and Zimmern.

== Members ==
The constituency was held by the Christian Democratic Union from its creation in 1994 until 2024. Its first representative was Konrad Illing, who served from 1994 to 2004, followed by Wieland Rose (2004–2009) and Mario Voigt (2009–present). In 2024, Wiebke Muhsal of the AfD won the seat.

Election	Member	Party	%
1994	Konrad Illing	CDU	44.2
1999	Konrad Illing	CDU	52.1
2004	Wieland Rose	CDU	43.5
2009	Mario Voigt	CDU	36.9
2014	Mario Voigt	CDU	41.2
2019	Mario Voigt	CDU	34.1
2024	Wiebke Muhsal	AfD	38.9

== Election results ==
=== 2024 election ===
State election (2024): Saale-Holzland-Kreis II
Notes:	Blue background denotes the winner of the electorate vote. Pink background denotes a candidate elected from their party list. Yellow background denotes an electorate win by a list member, or other incumbent. A ✓ or ✗ denotes status of any incumbent, win or lose respectively.						
Party	Candidate	Votes	%	±%	Party votes	%	±%
AfD	Wiebke Muhsal	9,976	38.9	▲15.6	8,880	34.4	▲10.9
CDU	✗ Mario Voigt	9,560	37.3	▲3.2	6,905	26.7	▲2.6
BSW					4,005	15.5	
Left	Steffen Much	3,424	13.4	▼11.8	3,008	11.6	▼18.7
SPD	Peter Zenner	1,054	4.1	▼2.5	1,086	4.2	▼2.3
FW	Franz Gobel	902	3.5		251	1.0	
Greens	Olaf Reiner Möller	413	1.6	▼3.7	580	2.2	▼1.7
APT					312	1.2	Steady
FDP	William Schlosser	317	1.2	▼4.4	263	1.0	▼5.1
Values					195	0.8	
Familie					125	0.5	
BD					119	0.5	
Pirates					62	0.2	▼0.2
ÖDP					36	0.1	▼0.3
MLPD					21	0.1	Steady
Informal votes		398			196		
Total valid votes		25,646			25,848		
Turnout		26,044	77.4	▲9.1			
AfD gain from CDU	Majority	416	1.6				

=== 2019 election ===
State election (2019): Saale-Holzland-Kreis II
Notes:	Blue background denotes the winner of the electorate vote. Pink background denotes a candidate elected from their party list. Yellow background denotes an electorate win by a list member, or other incumbent. A ✓ or ✗ denotes status of any incumbent, win or lose respectively.						
Party	Candidate	Votes	%	±%	Party votes	%	±%
CDU	✓ Mario Voigt	7,974	34.1	▼7.1	5,654	24.1	▼10.8
Left	Steffen Much	5,898	25.2	▼2.2	7,113	30.3	▲2.8
AfD	Jörg Henke	5,449	23.3	▲9.3	5,514	23.5	▲9.3
SPD	Moritz Kalthoff	1,533	6.6	▼3.0	1,523	6.5	▼3.1
FDP	Hardy Scheidig	1,314	5.6		1,436	6.1	▲3.7
Greens	Astrid Matthey	1,230	5.3	▲0.6	914	3.9	▼1.1
List-only parties					1,308	5.6	
Informal votes		346			282		
Total valid votes		23,398			23,462		
Turnout		23,744	68.3	▲12.6			
CDU hold	Majority	2,076	8.9	▼4.9			

=== 2014 election ===
State election (2014): Saale-Holzland-Kreis II
Notes:	Blue background denotes the winner of the electorate vote. Pink background denotes a candidate elected from their party list. Yellow background denotes an electorate win by a list member, or other incumbent. A ✓ or ✗ denotes status of any incumbent, win or lose respectively.						
Party	Candidate	Votes	%	±%	Party votes	%	±%
CDU	✓ Mario Voigt	8,128	41.2	▲4.3	6,924	34.9	▲1.4
Left	Mike Huster	5,401	27.4	▼1.1	5,458	27.5	▼1.1
AfD	Jörg Henke	2,760	14.0		2,811	14.2	
SPD	Regine Kanis	1,886	9.6	▼7.6	1,909	9.6	▼7.5
Greens	Roberto Kobelt	935	4.7	▼0.8	988	5.0	▲0.1
NPD	Sebastian Sillge	629	3.2	▼0.7	770	3.9	▲0.3
List-only parties					960	4.8	
Informal votes		350			269		
Total valid votes		19,739			19,820		
Turnout		20,089	55.7	▼1.8			
CDU hold	Majority	2,727	13.8	▲5.4			

=== 2009 election ===
State election (2009): Saale-Holzland-Kreis II
Notes:	Blue background denotes the winner of the electorate vote. Pink background denotes a candidate elected from their party list. Yellow background denotes an electorate win by a list member, or other incumbent. A ✓ or ✗ denotes status of any incumbent, win or lose respectively.						
Party	Candidate	Votes	%	±%	Party votes	%	±%
CDU	Mario Voigt	7,900	36.9	▼6.6	7,204	33.5	▼10.4
Left	Manuela Seydewitz	6,107	28.5	▼2.4	6,165	28.6	▲2.7
SPD	Hans-Peter Perschke	3,681	17.2	▲1.6	3,688	17.1	▲2.0
FDP	Holger Joseph	1,726	8.1	▲2.4	1,791	8.3	▲4.5
Greens	Roberto Kobelt	1,169	5.5	▲1.2	1,045	4.9	▲1.4
NPD	Frank Jahn	834	3.9		770	3.6	▲2.0
List-only parties					861	4.0	
Informal votes		460			353		
Total valid votes		21,417			21,524		
Turnout		21,877	57.5	▲1.4			
CDU hold	Majority	1,793	8.4	▼4.2			

=== 2004 election ===
State election (2004): Saale-Holzland-Kreis II
Notes:	Blue background denotes the winner of the electorate vote. Pink background denotes a candidate elected from their party list. Yellow background denotes an electorate win by a list member, or other incumbent. A ✓ or ✗ denotes status of any incumbent, win or lose respectively.						
Party	Candidate	Votes	%	±%	Party votes	%	±%
CDU	Wieland Rose	9,067	43.5	▼8.6	9,235	43.9	▼6.4
PDS	Ruth Fuchs	6,442	30.9	▲11.1	5,454	25.9	▲4.9
SPD	Andreas Hipp	3,259	15.6	▼2.3	3,180	15.1	▼2.2
FDP	Holger Joseph	1,192	5.7	▲3.9	807	3.8	▲2.3
Greens	Matthias Mann	888	4.3	▲1.9	741	3.5	▲1.7
List-only parties					1,627	7.7	
Informal votes		1,110			914		
Total valid votes		20,848			21,044		
Turnout		21,958	56.1	▼3.1			
CDU hold	Majority	2,625	12.6	▼19.7			

=== 1999 election ===
State election (1999): Saale-Holzland-Kreis II
Notes:	Blue background denotes the winner of the electorate vote. Pink background denotes a candidate elected from their party list. Yellow background denotes an electorate win by a list member, or other incumbent. A ✓ or ✗ denotes status of any incumbent, win or lose respectively.						
Party	Candidate	Votes	%	±%	Party votes	%	±%
CDU	✓ Konrad Illing	11,819	52.1	▲7.8	11,422	50.3	▲7.8
PDS	Sigrun Lingel	4,480	19.8	▲4.2	4,783	21.0	▲5.4
SPD	Hans-Peter Perschke	4,065	17.9	▼10.8	3,939	17.3	▼11.7
VIBT	Thomas Körner	691	3.0		442	1.9	
REP	Harry Drechsler	669	2.9		227	1.0	▼0.4
Greens	Martin Berger	540	2.4	▼5.0	418	1.8	▼3.7
FDP	Frank Rohleder	419	1.8	▼2.1	338	1.5	▼2.3
List-only parties					1,156	5.1	
Informal votes		338			296		
Total valid votes		22,683			22,725		
Turnout		23,021	59.2	▼14.5			
CDU hold	Majority	7,339	32.3	▲16.7			

=== 1994 election ===
State election (1994): Holzlandkreis II
Notes:	Blue background denotes the winner of the electorate vote. Pink background denotes a candidate elected from their party list. Yellow background denotes an electorate win by a list member, or other incumbent. A ✓ or ✗ denotes status of any incumbent, win or lose respectively.						
Party	Candidate	Votes	%	±%	Party votes	%	±%
CDU	Konrad Illing	11,335	44.2		10,913	42.4	
SPD		7,397	28.9		7,479	29.1	
PDS		4,022	15.7		4,035	15.7	
Greens		1,885	7.4		1,041	5.4	
FDP		994	3.9		985	3.8	
List-only parties					1,278	5.0	
Informal votes		832			734		
Total valid votes		25,633			25,731		
Turnout		26,465	73.7				
CDU win new seat	Majority	3,938	15.3				
