= Sven Küntzel =

German politician (born 1973)

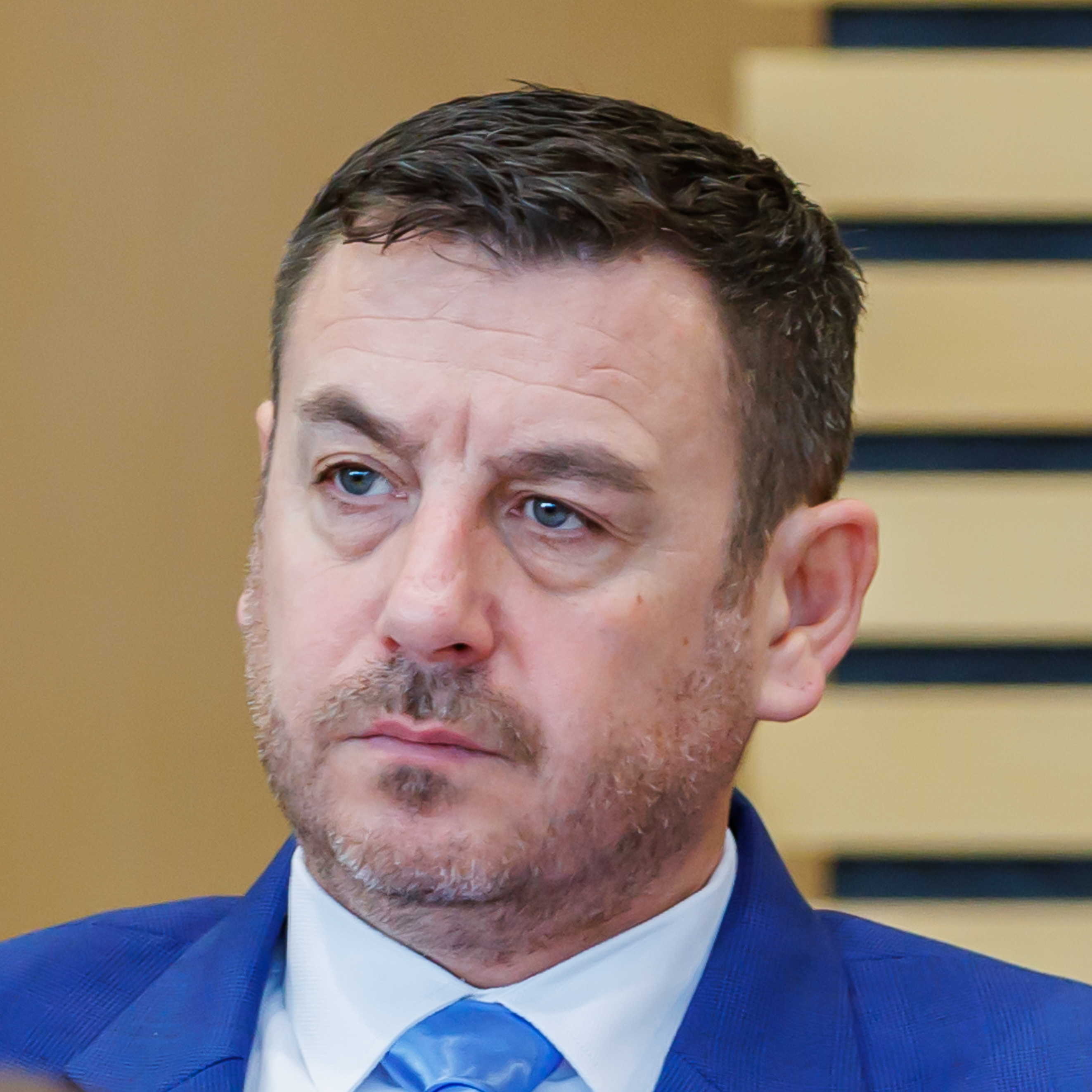
- Sven Küntzel in 2024

Member of the Landtag of Thuringia
- Incumbent
- Assumed office 2024

Personal details
- Born: 1973 (age 52–53) Erfurt, East Germany (now Germany)
- Party: Sahra Wagenknecht Alliance

Sven Küntzel (born 1973) is a German politician from the Sahra Wagenknecht Alliance (BSW). He has been a member of the Landtag of Thuringia since 2024.

== Biography ==
Sven Küntzel was born in Erfurt and, after graduating from Polytechnic Secondary School, trained as an automotive mechanic. Following his military service in the German Armed Forces, he initially trained for the intermediate-level police service and has been a police officer ever since. From 2005 to 2008, he studied for the higher-level police service at the University of Applied Sciences for Public Administration (Police Department) and graduated with a degree in Public Administration (FH). Between 2008 and 2024, he worked in the criminal investigation department of the State Police Directorate and the Thuringian Ministry of the Interior and Municipal Affairs.

Küntzel lives in Dachwig, is married and has one child.

== Political career ==
In 2024, he joined the Sahra Wagenknecht Alliance and was elected to the 8th Landtag of Thuringia via the seventh spot on the party list in the 2024 Thuringian state election. He is also a member of the BSW faction in the Gotha district council and a member of the Dachwig municipal council.

In August 2026, the BSW national leadership called on their Thuringian branch to leave the state government. However, the majority of the faction resisted the demand and decided to continue supporting the government. Only Küntzel and his fellow party member Anke Wirsing withdrew their support for Minister-President Mario Voigt from the Christian Democratic Union of Germany (CDU).
