= Steffen Schütz =

German entrepreneur and politician

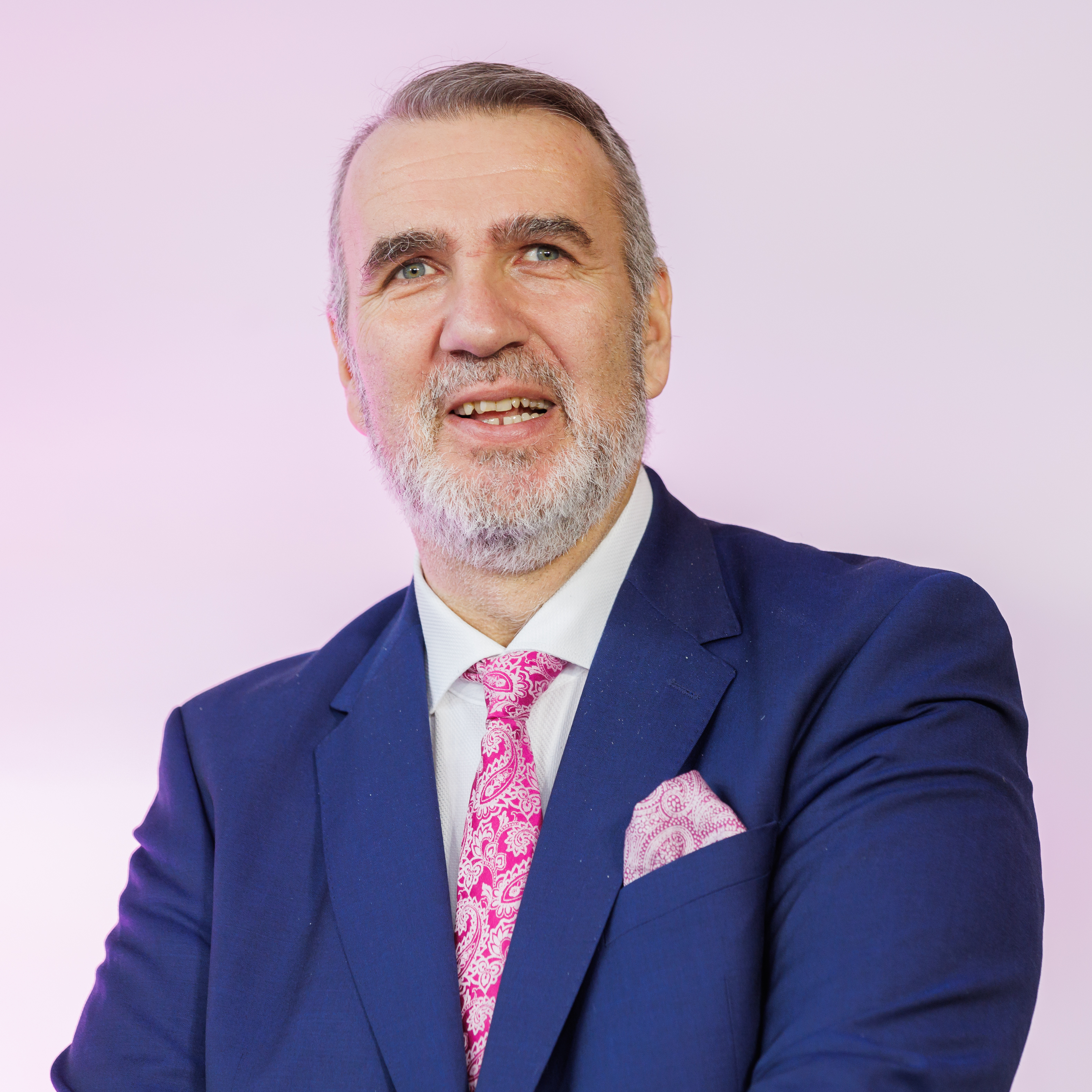
- Schütz in 2024

Co-Chair of BSW Thuringia
- Incumbent
- Assumed office 2024 Serving with Katja Wolf

Minister for Digital Affairs and Infrastructure of Thuringia
- Incumbent
- Assumed office 13 December 2024

Member of the Landtag of Thuringia
- Incumbent
- Assumed office 1 September 2024

Personal details
- Born: 1966 (age 59–60) Eisenach, East Germany
- Party: BSW

Steffen Schütz (born 1966) is a German entrepreneur and politician from the Sahra Wagenknecht Alliance (BSW). Since 2024 he has been a member of the Landtag of Thuringia and Thuringian Minister for Digital Affairs and Infrastructure. Also since 2024 he has been co-chair of the BSW Thuringia alongside Katja Wolf.

== Life ==
Steffen Schütz studied communication studies at the Berlin School of Advertising and Design from 1987 to 1990 and graduated with a degree in communication design (FH) . He was branch manager of a trade fair construction company in Berlin (1990–1992) and managing director of an advertising company, also in Berlin (1993–1997). Since 1997 he has run an advertising agency in Berlin. He is married, has no children and lives in Erfurt.

== Political career ==
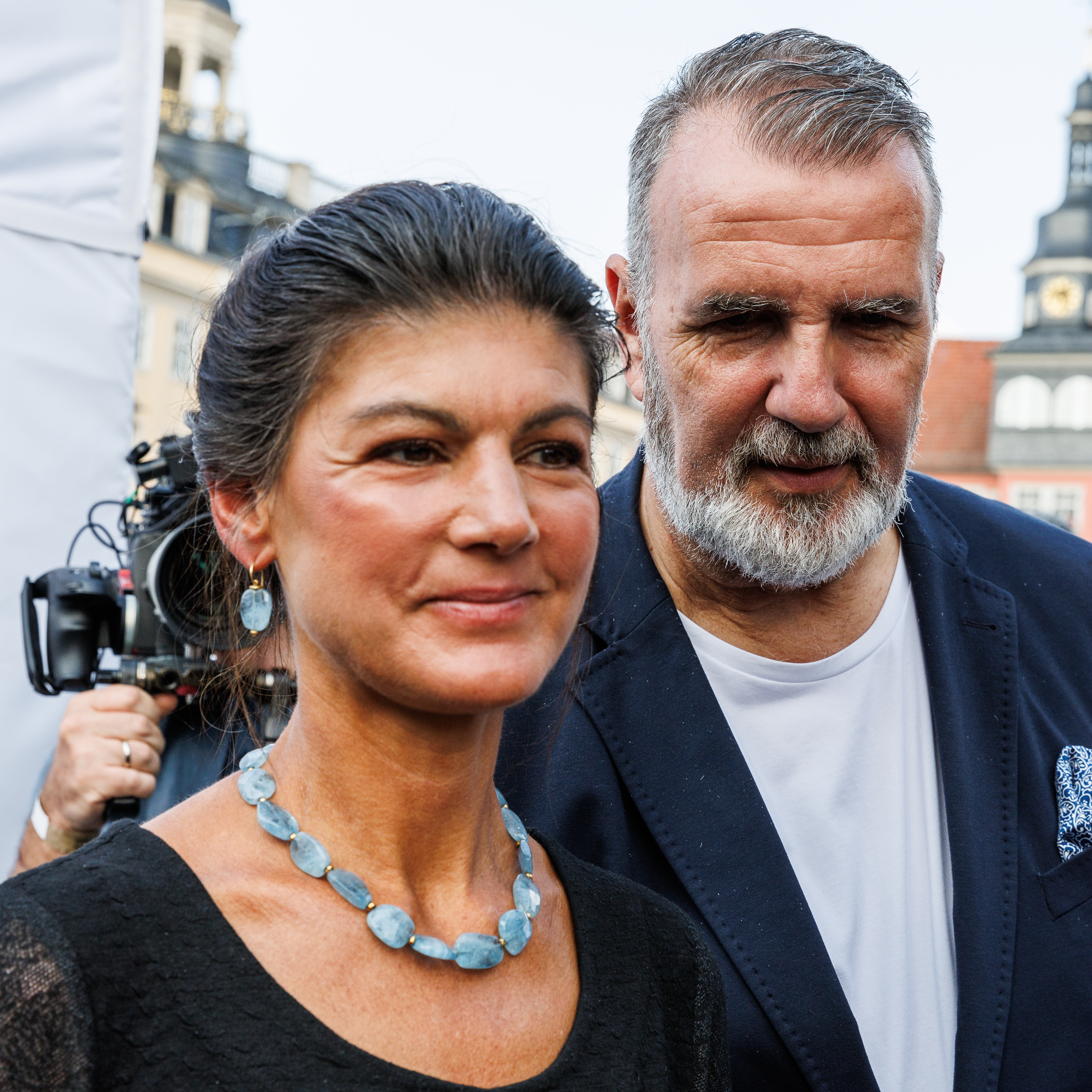
Schütz with BSW leader Sahra Wagenknecht in 2024

Schütz has been a member of the newly founded Sahra Wagenknecht Alliance since 2024 and was elected co-state chairman in Thuringia. In the 2024 Thuringian state election, he took second place on the BSW state list and was elected to the Landtag of Thuringia.

On 13 December 2024, Schütz was appointed Thuringian Minister for Digital Affairs and Infrastructure in the Voigt Cabinet.

In 2025 an anonymous corruption complaint was filed against Schütz because, in 2022, he had invited politicians while acting as a business partner of the City of Eisenach. His immunity was lifted several times for the investigation, but no wrongdoing on Schütz's part was found.
