= Moritz Kalthoff =

German politician (born 1992)

Member of the Landtag of Thuringia
- Incumbent
- Assumed office 1 March 2025
- Preceded by: Katharina Schenk

Personal details
- Born: 1 March 1992 (age 34)
- Party: Social Democratic Party (since 2013)

Moritz Kalthoff (born 1 March 1992) is a German politician serving as a member of the Landtag of Thuringia since 2025. He is the spokesperson for labour, health care, economy, agriculture and rural areas of the Social Democratic Party group in the Landtag.
