= Great Coalition (Weimar Republic) =

1920–23 pro-democratic German alliance

The Great Coalition (German: Große Koalition, 13 August – 30 November 1923) was a grand coalition during the Weimar Republic that was made up of the four main pro-democratic parties in the Reichstag:

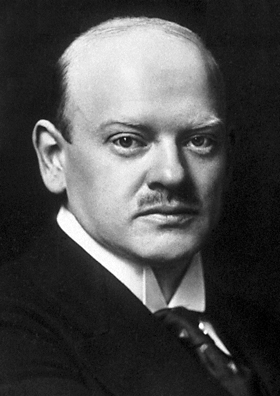
Gustav Stresemann, Reich chancellor during the Great Coalition, in 1923

- The Social Democratic Party (SPD), a moderate socialist party
- The Centre Party, a centre-right Catholic party
- The German Democratic Party (DDP), a liberal middle-class party
- The German People's Party (DVP), a centre-right party led by Gustav Stresemann

The first effort to form such a union was made after 1920 election by DVP Reichstag leader Rudolf Heinze; the SPD refused to join, due to some DVP deputies lack of condemnation of the Kapp Putsch. Joseph Wirth attempted to form a Great Coalition in an attempt the save the Second Wirth Cabinet in November 1922 but this attempt failed when the DVP’s Hugo Stinnes demanded a change to the eight-hour work day and called for overtime work without overtime pay; this led the SPD to refuse to join, and Wirth was forced to resign. The coalition was formed under Reich Chancellor Gustav Stresemann in 1923 with the backing of all four parties. It was a time of multiple crises for the Weimar Republic. Hyperinflation, fueled by the policy of passive resistance towards the French and Belgian occupation of the Ruhr, was at its peak, and parties on the extreme left and right had taken over or joined the governments in Bavaria, Saxony and Thuringia.

During its brief three months in office, the Great Coalition ended the passive resistance against the Ruhr occupation, successfully stabilized the currency by replacing the worthless Papiermark with the Rentenmark and expelled the German Communist Party from the governments of Saxony and Thuringia by means of a Reichsexekution. Although it had policy achievements, Stresemann’s Great Coalition revealed the precarious nature of the coalition as it was forced to counterbalance the SPD on the Left and the DVP on the Right.

In part due to the latter move, the SPD withdrew from the Great Coalition in November 1923 and brought down the Stresemann government.

The second cabinet of Hermann Müller (28 June 1928 – 27 March 1930) could also be considered a Great Coalition. In addition to the other four parties, it included the Catholic Bavarian People's Party, which had historical ties to the Centre Party.

== See also ==
- Grand coalition (Germany)
- Weimar Coalition
