= Colette Boos-John =

German politician (born 1969)

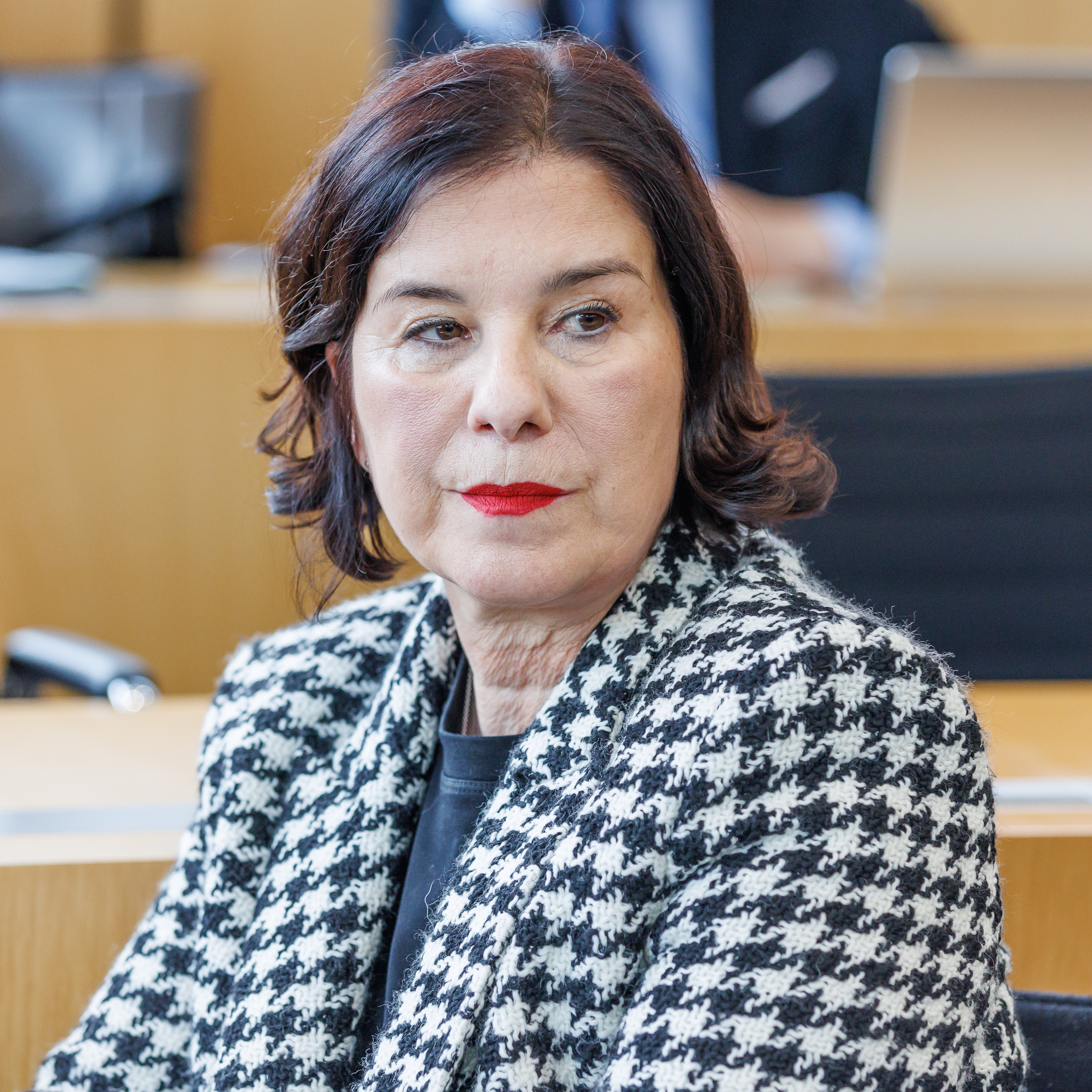
- Colette Boos-John in 2026

Minister for Economic Affairs, Agriculture and Rural Areas of Thuringia
- Incumbent
- Assumed office 2024

Personal details
- Born: Colette Bettina Bauer; 3 September 1969 (age 56) Marburg, Germany
- Party: CDU

Colette Bettina Boos-John (née Bauer; born 3 September 1969) is a German politician from the Christian Democratic Union of Germany (CDU). She has been Thuringia's Minister for Economic Affairs, Agriculture and Rural Areas since 2024 .

== Life ==
=== Education and career ===
Boos-John studied business administration at the Gießen-Friedberg University of Applied Sciences from 1989 to 1992 and graduated with a degree in business administration. She then joined her parents' road, civil engineering and building construction company Bauer Bauunternehmen GmbH and was its commercial director from 1992 to 1997. In 1997, she took over the company as managing partner. She founded the Bauer Academy in 2012 and completed training as a business coach in 2022 , which is dvct -certified. In 2024, she founded the investment company B & J GmbH & Co. KG as managing director and sold the construction company to Bickhardt Bau.

=== Politics and volunteering ===
Boos-John is a member of the CDU. She was a member of the board of the Economic Council of the CDU Erfurt from 2009 to 2016 .

In 2015, she became a board member of Die Familienunternehmer, where she became chairwoman of the West Thuringia regional group and state chairwoman of Thuringia in 2019. In addition, she took on the honorary position of Vice President of the Erfurt Chamber of Industry and Commerce in 2016 and head of the IHK SME network in 2021. In addition, she was active in the SME network of the German Chamber of Industry and Commerce. From 2018 to 2019, she was a mentor in the ThEx Frauensache program of the Thuringian Center for Start-ups and Entrepreneurship. In 2022, she became a member of the Thuringian Standards Control Council. In 2024, she also became active as a role model entrepreneur in the "FRAUEN unternehmen" initiative of the Federal Ministry for Economic Affairs and Climate Protection.

On 13 December 2024, Boos-John was appointed Thuringia's Minister for Economic Affairs, Agriculture and Rural Areas in the Voigt Cabinet.

=== Awards ===
- Ehrennadel Badge of Honour of the Chamber of Commerce and Industry (2022)
- Wilhelm-Röpke Medal of the Thuringian State Association of the Economic Council Wirtschaftsrates of the CDU (2024)
