= Your Vote Counts =

Political party in Germany

Your Vote Counts Deine Stimme zählt
- Founded: 2 September 2026
- Split from: Sahra Wagenknecht Alliance
- Membership (2026): <10
- Colours: Black; Red; Yellow
- Landtag of Thuringia: 3 / 88

Website
- deine-stimme-zählt.org

Your Vote Counts (German: Deine Stimme zählt) is a political party founded by former members of the Sahra Wagenknecht Alliance (BSW). The party seeks to found a parliamentary group as it lacks the five members to found a faction.

The federal leadership of the BSW had initially backed the Blackberry coalition, but later withdrew support and called on its members in the Landtag to join the opposition. Some dissident members, who disagreed with the decision, split from the party and founded Your Vote Counts so they could continue to support the ruling cabinet. According to Stefan Wogawa, the party does not want to change its behavior in parliament and sees great matches with the Voigt cabinet.

== See also ==
- We for Brandenburg, a similar parliamentary group in Brandenburg
- Thuringia.Just, a later splitter party in Thuringia
