= Voigt cabinet =

State government of Thuringia since 2024

Voigt Cabinet
- 11th Cabinet of Thuringia
- 12 December 2024–
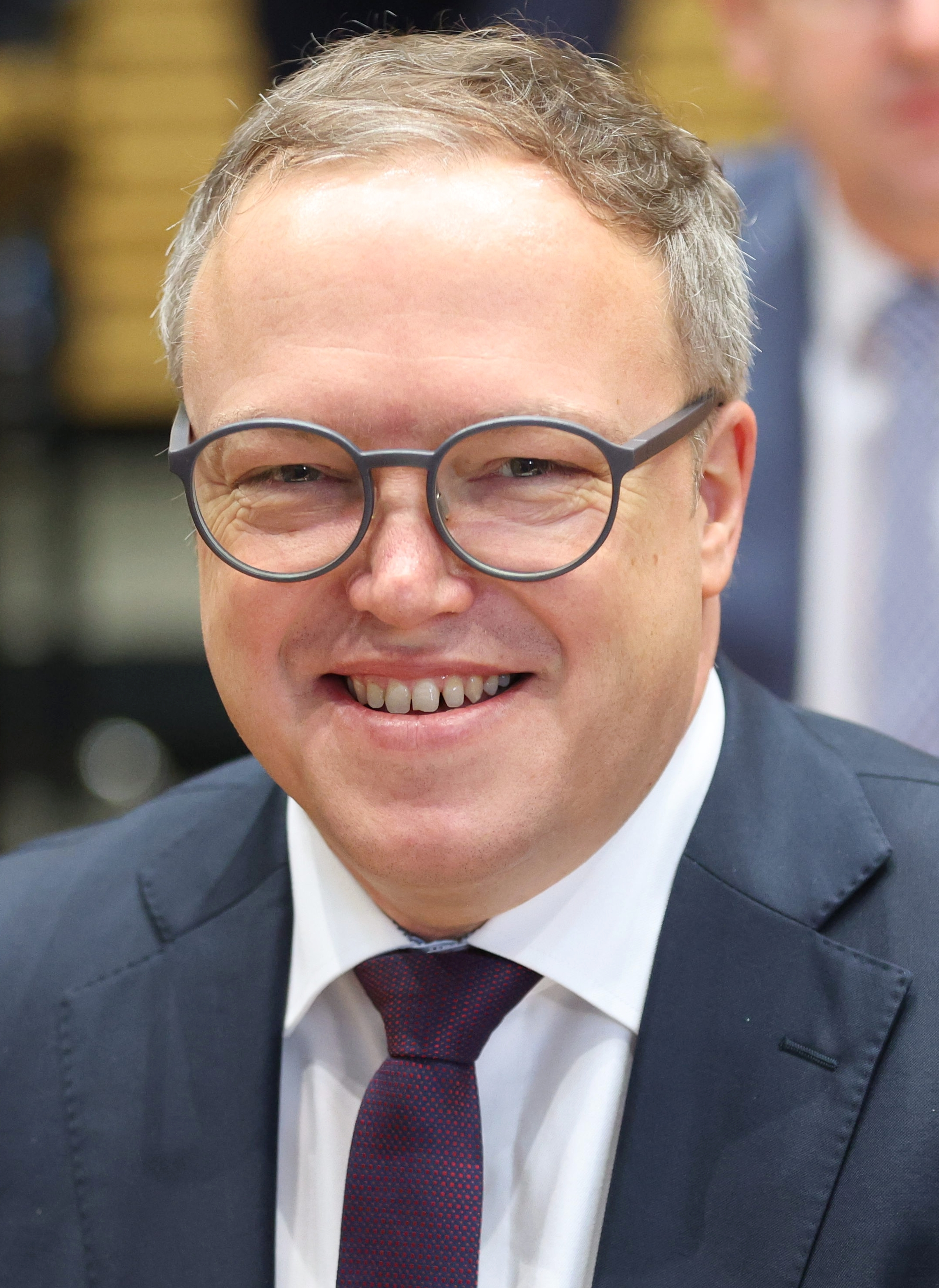
- Date formed: 12 December 2024

People and organisations
- Minister-President: Mario Voigt
- Deputy Minister-President: Katja Wolf
- No. of ministers: 9
- Member parties: Christian Democratic Union; Sahra Wagenknecht Alliance (2024–2026); Thuringia.Just (since 2026); Social Democratic Party
- Status in legislature: Minority government (Coalition)
- Opposition parties: Alternative for Germany; The Left; Sahra Wagenknecht Alliance (since 2026)

History
- Election: 2024 Thuringian state election
- Legislature term: 8th Landtag of Thuringia
- Predecessor: Ramelow II

The Voigt cabinet is the current state government of Thuringia, sworn in on 12 December 2024 May after Mario Voigt was elected as Minister-President of Thuringia by the Landtag of Thuringia. It is the 11th Cabinet of Thuringia.

It was formed after the 2024 Thuringian state election by the Christian Democratic Union (CDU), Social Democratic Party (SPD) and the Sahra Wagenknecht Alliance (BSW). A coalition of these three parties was the first of its kind in Germany and is known colloquially as a "blackberry coalition".

Following a poor result for the BSW in the 2025 German federal election, national party leader Sahra Wagenknecht stated that the party's participation in the government in Thuringia was responsible for the party's lower-than-expected national vote share. In September 2026, amid increased public pressure from Wagenknecht for the state's BSW members to end its participation in the Voigt cabinet, 13 of the 15 BSW members of the Landtag of Thuringia left the BSW and formed a new party, Thüringen.Gerecht. All three BSW cabinet members, including First Deputy Minister-President Katja Wolf, joined the new party.

== Composition ==
The Voigt cabinet ministers were sworn in on 13 December 2024.

Portfolio	Senator	Party	Took office	Left office	State secretaries
Minister-President	Mario Voigt born 8 February 1977 (age 49)	CDU	12 December 2024	Incumbent	
First Deputy Minister-President	Katja Wolf born 7 March 1976 (age 50)	BSW (until 2026)	13 December 2024	Incumbent	Julian Vonarb; Birger Scholz
Minister of Finance	Katja Wolf born 7 March 1976 (age 50)	Thuringia.Just (from 2026)	13 December 2024	Incumbent	Julian Vonarb; Birger Scholz
Second Deputy Minister-President	Georg Maier born 25 April 1967 (age 59)	SPD	12 December 2024	Incumbent	Norman Müller
Minister for the Interior, Local Government and Regional Development	Georg Maier born 25 April 1967 (age 59)	SPD	12 December 2024	Incumbent	Norman Müller
Head of the State Chancellery	Stefan Gruhner born 23 October 1984 (age 41)	CDU	13 December 2024	Incumbent	Stephan König
Minister for Federal and European Affairs, Sports and Voluntary Work	Stefan Gruhner born 23 October 1984 (age 41)	CDU	13 December 2024	Incumbent	Stephan König
Minister for Justice, Migration and Consumer Protection	Beate Meißner born 2 April 1982 (age 44)	CDU	13 December 2024	Incumbent	Christian Klein
Minister for Economic Affairs, Agriculture and Rural Areas	Colette Boos-John born 3 September 1969 (age 57)	CDU	13 December 2024	Incumbent	Mario Suckert; Marcus Malsch
Minister for Digital Affairs and Infrastructure	Steffen Schütz born 1966 (age 59–60)	BSW (until 2026)	13 December 2024	Incumbent	Tobias J. Knoblich
Minister for Digital Affairs and Infrastructure	Steffen Schütz born 1966 (age 59–60)	Thuringia.Just (from 2026)	13 December 2024	Incumbent	Tobias J. Knoblich
Minister for Social Affairs, Health, Labor and Family	Katharina Schenk born 23 January 1988 (age 38)	SPD	13 December 2024	Incumbent	Udo Götze
Minister for the Environment, Energy, Nature Conservation and Forestry	Tilo Kummer born 29 June 1968 (age 58)	BSW (until 2026)	13 December 2024	Incumbent	
Minister for the Environment, Energy, Nature Conservation and Forestry	Tilo Kummer born 29 June 1968 (age 58)	Thuringia.Just (from 2026)	13 December 2024	Incumbent	
Minister for Education, Science and Culture	Christian Tischner born 18 August 1981 (age 45)	CDU	13 December 2024	Incumbent	

== Investiture vote ==
Minister-President election
Ballot →	12 December 2024
Required majority →	45 out of 88
Mario Voigt	51 / 88
Against	33 / 88
Abstentions	4 / 88
