= We for Brandenburg =

German parliamentary group

We for Brandenburg Wir für Brandenburg
- Chamber: Landtag of Brandenburg
- Legislature(s): 8th (2024–2029)
- Foundation: 18 June 2026
- Spokesperson: André von Ossowski
- Representation: 3 / 88

We for Brandenburg (German: Wir für Brandenburg; WfB) is a parliamentary group in the Landtag of Brandenburg founded by former members of the Sahra Wagenknecht Alliance (BSW) who left the party during a government crisis which caused BSW to leave the government. To allow the group, a previous rule stating that members of a party list can only found a single parliamentary groups and fractions nicknamed "Lex AfD" had to be reversed.

The group stated that they are at a "critical distance to the government" but rejects being part of the "fundamental opposition". BSW and Alternative for Germany (AfD) heavily criticized its foundation calling it "We for Woidke", a reference to Brandenburg minister-president Dietmar Woidke, whom WfB parliamentarians are supporting outside of government.

== See also ==
- Your Vote Counts, a similar party in Thuringia
- Thuringia.Just, a similar party in Thuringia
