= Thüringen.Gerecht =

Political party in Germany

- Chairwoman: Katja Wolf
- Deputy chairs: Steffen Schütz; Steffi Eschrich
- Founded: 6 September 2026
- Split from: Sahra Wagenknecht Alliance
- Colours: Orange; Dark blue
- Landtag of Thuringia: 9 / 88
- Bundesrat: 1 / 69

Website
- thueringen-gerecht.de

Thüringen.Gerecht (German, translated Thuringia.Just or Thuringia.Fair) is a political party in the German state of Thuringia founded by former members of the Sahra Wagenknecht Alliance (BSW).

The federal leadership of the BSW had initially backed the Blackberry coalition, but later withdrew support and called on its members in the Landtag to join the opposition. Some dissident members, who disagreed with the decision, split from the party so they could continue to support the ruling cabinet but remained with the BSW group.

== See also ==
- We for Brandenburg, a similar parliamentary group in Brandenburg
- Your Vote Counts, a earlier splitter party in Thuringia
