= 2027 Schleswig-Holstein state election =

German state election

- 18 April 2027

All 69 seats in the Landtag of Schleswig-Holstein 35 seats needed for a majority
Party	CDU	Greens	SPD
Last election	34 seats, 43.4%	14 seats, 18.3%	12 seats, 16.2%
Party	FDP	SSW
Last election	5 seats, 6.4%	4 seats, 5.7%
Incumbent Government
Second Günther cabinet
CDU–Green

The 2027 Schleswig-Holstein state election is scheduled to be held on 18 April 2027 to elect the 21st Landtag, or state parliament, of Schleswig-Holstein in Germany.

== Electoral system ==
The Landtag is elected via mixed-member proportional representation. 35 members are elected in single-member constituencies via first-past-the-post voting. 34 members are then allocated using compensatory proportional representation. Voters have two votes: the "first vote" for candidates in single-member constituencies, and the "second vote" for party lists, which are used to fill the proportional seats. The minimum size of the Landtag is 69 members, but if overhang seats are present, proportional leveling seats will be added to ensure proportionality. An electoral threshold of 5% of valid votes is applied to the Landtag; parties that fall below this threshold, and fail to win at least one constituency, are ineligible to receive seats. Parties representing the Danish minority of Southern Schleswig and the Frisians, such as the South Schleswig Voters' Association, are exempt from the threshold.

== Opinion polls ==
Polling firm	Fieldwork date	Sample size	CDU	Grüne	SPD	FDP	SSW	AfD	Linke	BSW	Others	Lead
INSA	7–14 Jul 2026	1,000	27	17	15	6	6	18	7	–	4	9
Infratest dimap	8–13 Apr 2026	1,155	33	19	12	4	5	15	6	–	6	14
Federal Parliament election	23 Feb 2025	–	27.6	14.9	18.8	4.7	4.0	16.3	7.8	3.4	2.6	8.8
INSA	13–20 Jan 2025	1,000	39	13	16	4	6	14	–	3	5	23
EP election	9 Jun 2024	–	30.2	15.4	16.7	6.3	–	12.2	2.3	4.1	12.8	13.5
INSA	6–13 Nov 2023	1,000	40	15	16	6	6	12	–	–	5	24
Wahlkreisprognose	24 Sep–2 Oct 2023	1,000	32.5	18	14	5	9	15	1.5	–	5	14.5
Infratest dimap	20–25 Apr 2023	1,160	38	17	15	8	7	8	–	–	7	21
INSA	17–24 Apr 2023	1,000	39	17	16	8	7	7	2	–	4	22
2022 state election	8 May 2022	–	43.4	18.3	16.2	6.4	5.7	4.4	1.7	–	3.9	25.1
