= Georg Maier (politician) =

German politician (born 1967)

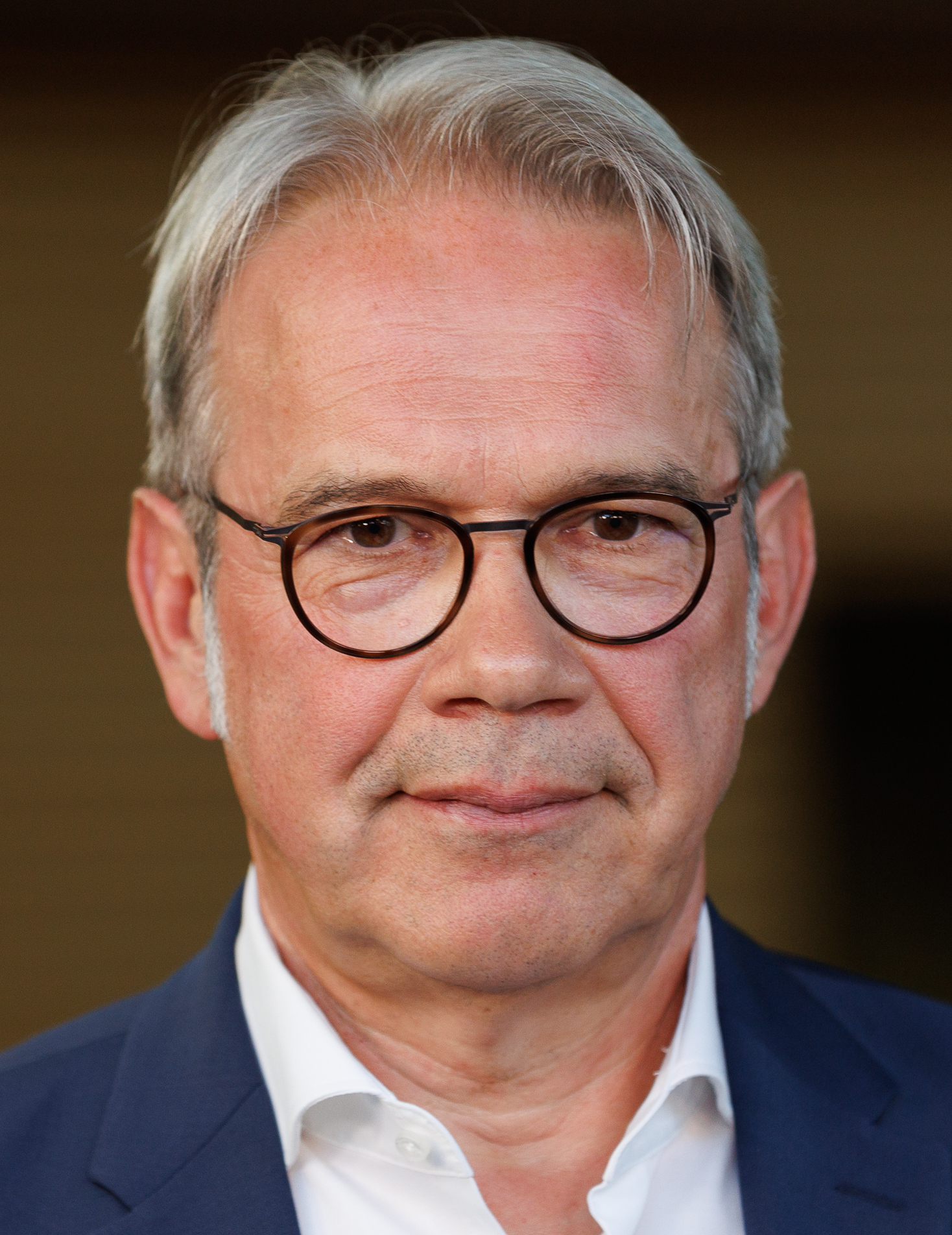
- Maier in 2024

Deputy Minister-President of Thuringia
- Incumbent
- Assumed office 31 August 2021 Serving with Katja Wolf since 2024
- President: Bodo Ramelow; Mario Voigt
- Preceded by: Wolfgang Tiefensee

Minister of the Interior of Thuringia
- Incumbent
- Assumed office 30 August 2017
- President: Bodo Ramelow; Mario Voigt
- Preceded by: Holger Poppenhäger

Member of the Landtag of Thuringia
- In office 27 October 2019 – 30 June 2020

Personal details
- Born: 25 April 1967 (age 59) Singen, West Germany
- Party: SPD (2009–present)
- Spouse: Antonia Sturm (m. 2022)
- Children: 4
- Education: University of Mannheim; University of St. Gallen
- Occupation: Businessman • Politician

Georg Maier (born 25 April 1967) is a German politician from the Social Democratic Party of Germany. From 30 August 2017 to 5 February 2020, Maier was Minister of the Interior of the Free State of Thuringia in the First Ramelow cabinet. On 4 March 2020, he was reappointed minister of his previous ministry in the Second Ramelow cabinet. He has been state chairman of the SPD Thuringia since 26 September 2020 and deputy prime minister of Thuringia since 31 August 2021.

== Life ==
After graduating from high school in Singen and completing his military service, he studied business administration at the University of Mannheim and the University of St. Gallen from 1988 to 1994.

As a business graduate, Maier began his professional career in 1995 in Erfurt at the Federal Agency for Special Tasks Related to Unification (BvS). In 1996 he moved to the KfW banking group in Frankfurt am Main, where he held various positions until 2015, including head of the executive board. Most recently, he headed start-up and SME financing in Bonn. After previously living in Frankfurt am Main, Maier has lived in the small Thuringian town of Friedrichroda since 2018, where he was also a member of the city council. He is Roman Catholic. He has three children from his first marriage. He has been in a relationship with his second wife Antonia Sturm since 2017. The couple had a daughter in 2020 and married in 2022.

== Political career ==
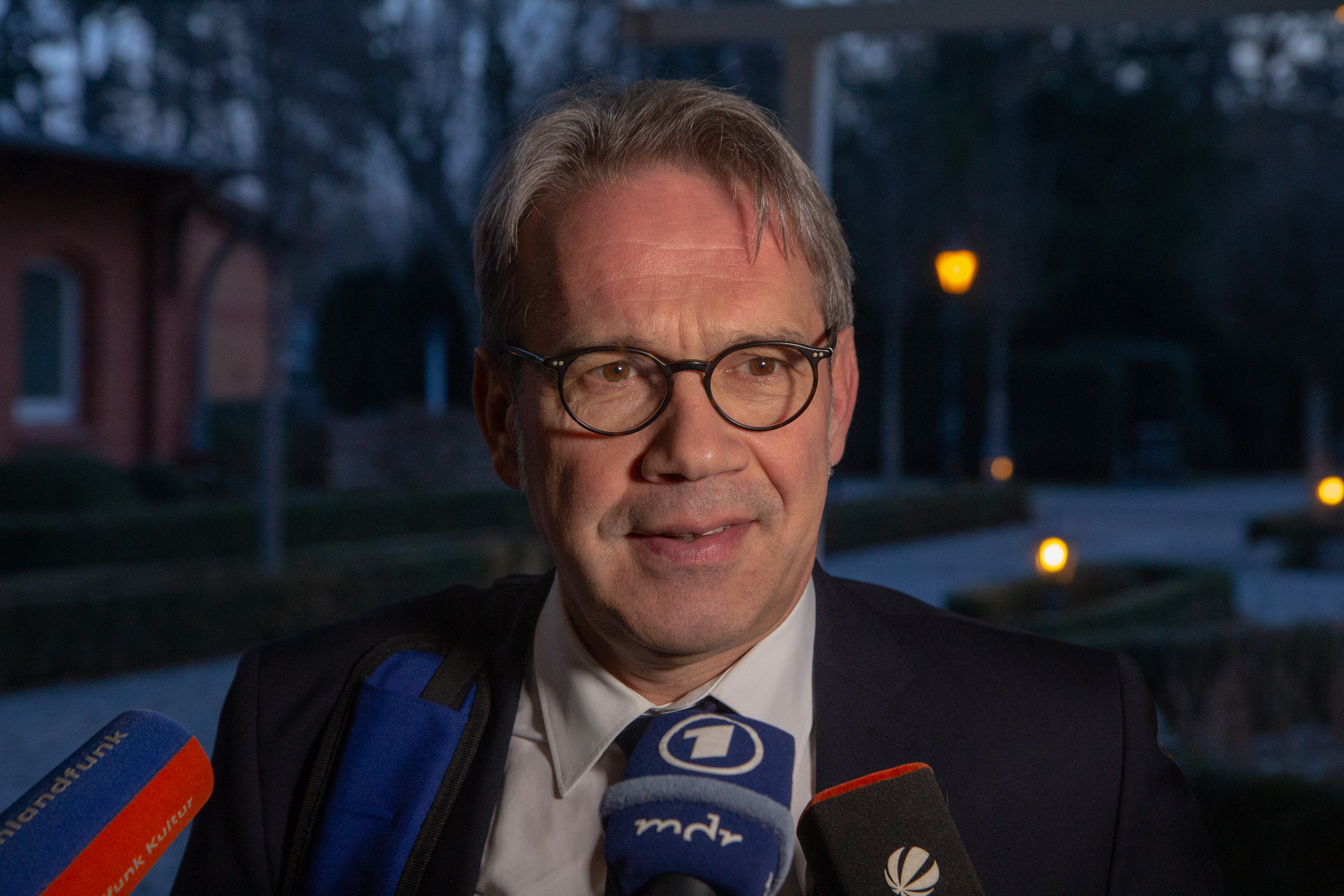
Georg Maier at the beginning of the 209th Conference of Interior Ministers at the end of November 2018 in Magdeburg

Georg Maier has been a member of the Social Democratic Party of Germany since 2009. In the 2013 German federal election campaign, he was part of the five-person strategy team of the SPD candidate for chancellor, Peer Steinbrück, on the SPD party executive board. His responsibility in the strategy team was on the topics of small and medium-sized businesses, energy, infrastructure and digitization. After the federal election campaign, he was appointed to the advisory board for Business and Finance and the Think Tank for Digitization and Society by the state chairman of the Hessian SPD, Thorsten Schäfer-Gümbel. He is also a member of the Friedrich Ebert Foundation's management circle and spokesman for the SPD's Finance Forum in Frankfurt.

On 30 June 2015, Maier became State Secretary in the Thuringian Ministry of Economic Affairs, Science and Digital Society, where he was responsible for economic policy, economic development, tourism and digital society. Since November 2016, he has been a member of the state executive committee of the SPD Thuringia. In November 2018, he was elected state treasurer at the state party conference in Arnstadt.

On 30 August 2017, the former State Secretary of Prime Minister Bodo Ramelow was appointed Minister of the Interior of Thuringia, succeeding the dismissed Holger Poppenhäger.

On 26 May 2019, Maier was elected to the city council of Friedrichroda and to the district council of Gotha district. He has since resigned from his city council mandate.

Maier has been a member of the Landtag of Thuringia since the 2019 Thuringian state election. On 30 June 2020, he resigned from his mandate to become minister of the interior again. He was succeeded by Denny Möller.

In September 2020, Maier was elected state chairman of the Thuringian SPD at the state party conference in Bad Blankenburg with 82.7 percent of the vote.

On 31 August 2021, Maier was appointed Deputy Prime Minister of Thuringia, succeeding Wolfgang Tiefensee. In December 2021, he was elected to the SPD Party Executive Committee. In December 2023, he was re-elected to this office.

Maier was the top candidate of the SPD Thuringia for the 2024 Thuringian state election.

== Honours ==
- German Fire Brigade Medal of Honour (2024)
