= Katja Wolf =

German politician

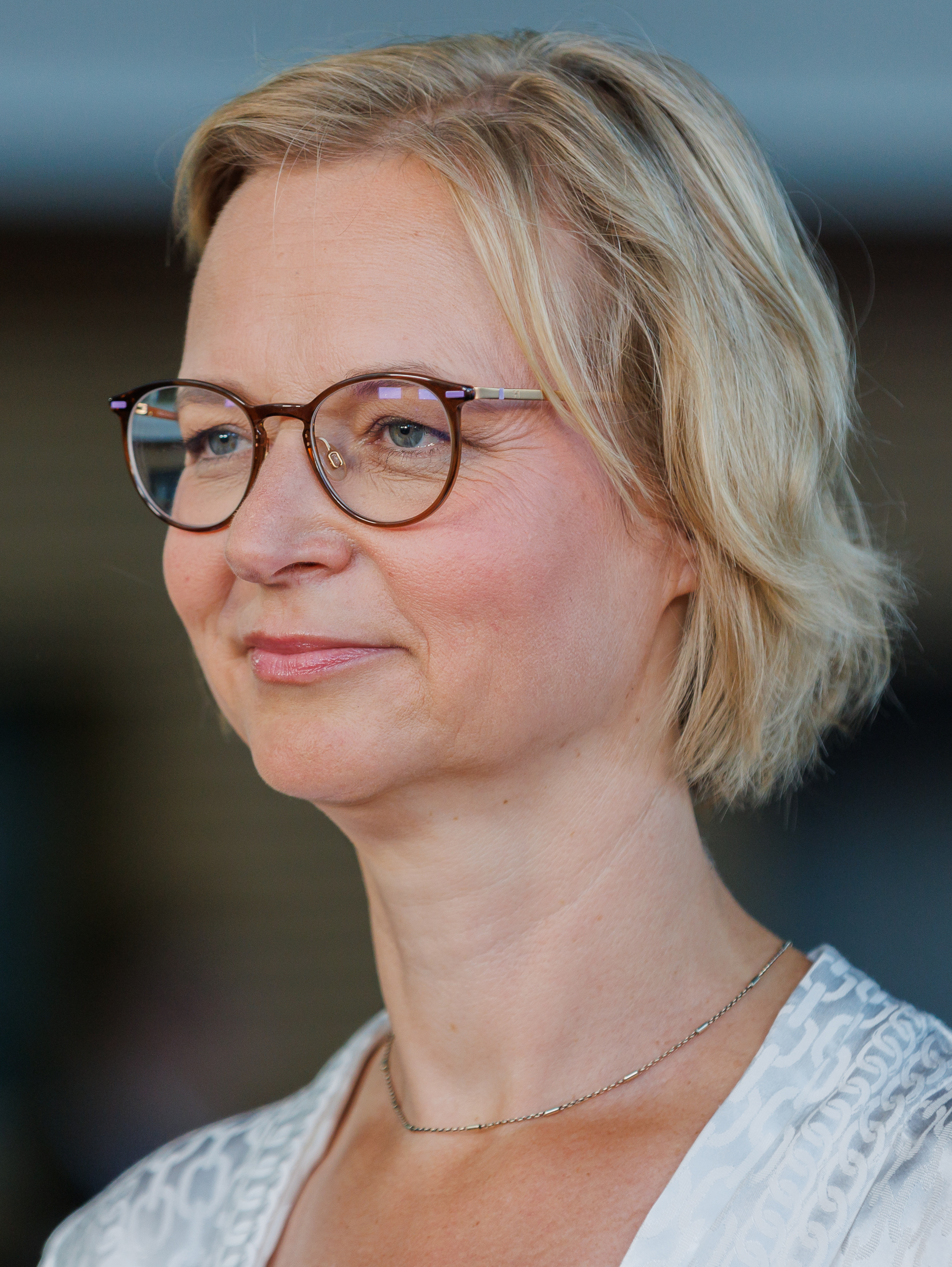
- Wolf in 2024

Deputy Minister-President of Thuringia
- Incumbent
- Assumed office 13 December 2024 Serving with Georg Maier
- President: Mario Voigt
- Preceded by: Anja Siegesmund

Minister for Finance of Thuringia
- Incumbent
- Assumed office 13 December 2024
- Preceded by: Heike Taubert

Member of the Landtag of Thuringia
- Incumbent
- Assumed office 1 September 2024
- In office 1 October 1999 – 30 June 2012

Mayor of Eisenach
- In office 1 July 2012 – 30 June 2024
- Preceded by: Matthias Doht
- Succeeded by: Christoph Ihling

Personal details
- Born: Katja Hofer; 7 March 1976 (age 50) Erfurt, East Germany
- Party: Thüringen.Gerecht (2026–present)
- Other political affiliations: PDS (1999–2007); The Left (2007–2024); BSW (2024–2026)
- Children: 2

Katja Wolf (born 7 March 1976) is a German politician (Thüringen.Gerecht, formerly BSW and The Left).

She was a member of Landtag of Thuringia from 1999 to 2012 for The Left. Between 2012 and 2024, she served as the mayor of Eisenach. She switched in 2024 to the newly founded Bündnis Sahra Wagenknecht (BSW), is state chairmen of BSW Thuringia, got elected in the 2024 Thuringian state election and became the BSW parliamentary group leader in the Thuringian state parliament.

After a three party CDU-SPD-BSW Blackberry coalition was formed, since December 2024 she is serving as First Deputy Minister-President and Minister for Finance of Thuringia. She and several BSW members left the party in early September 2026. On 6 September 2026, Wolf joined some of this group to found the new party Thüringen.Gerecht, where Wolf was elected as the founding chairwoman.

== Biography ==
After completing her Abitur in 1994 at the Heinrich-Hertz-Gymnasium in Erfurt, Wolf studied social work at the University of Applied Sciences Erfurt and graduated with a diploma in 1999. From January to August 1999 she worked as a researcher for the Landtag of Thuringia. In the 1999 Thuringian state election, she was elected at an age of 23 to the Thuringian state parliament for The Left Thuringia. Wolf became chair of the Equal Opportunities Committee (Gleichstellungsausschuss) and environmental policy spokesperson for the parliamentary group. She has been a member of the Eisenach city council since 2004.

In the 2009 Thuringian state election, Wolf won the direct mandate in the constituency of Wartburgkreis II – Eisenach. For the Left, she was chairwoman of the Equal Opportunities Committee and environmental policy spokesperson for the parliamentary group.

For the 2012 Thuringian municipal elections, Wolf stood as a candidate for mayor of the city of Eisenach. On 6 May 2012, she was elected mayor with 51.6% of the vote.

On 15 June 2015, a recall petition filed by the National Democratic Party of Germany (NPD) in city council also attracted considerable attention beyond the region when 16 out of 34 city councillors voted in favour of the motion in secret ballot, although the NPD had only three seats.

She is the lead candidate for Bündnis Sahra Wagenknecht in the 2024 Thuringian state election. She was elected, and the party got 15 seats and third place after the AfD and CDU. Wolf negotiated for the BSW Thuringia with the CDU and SPD about a coalition in Thuringia. At the end of October 2024, the three parties presented a paper that recognized the parties' different positions on foreign policy. The Federal Executive Board led by Sahra Wagenkencht consequently opposed the decision to start coalition negotiations.

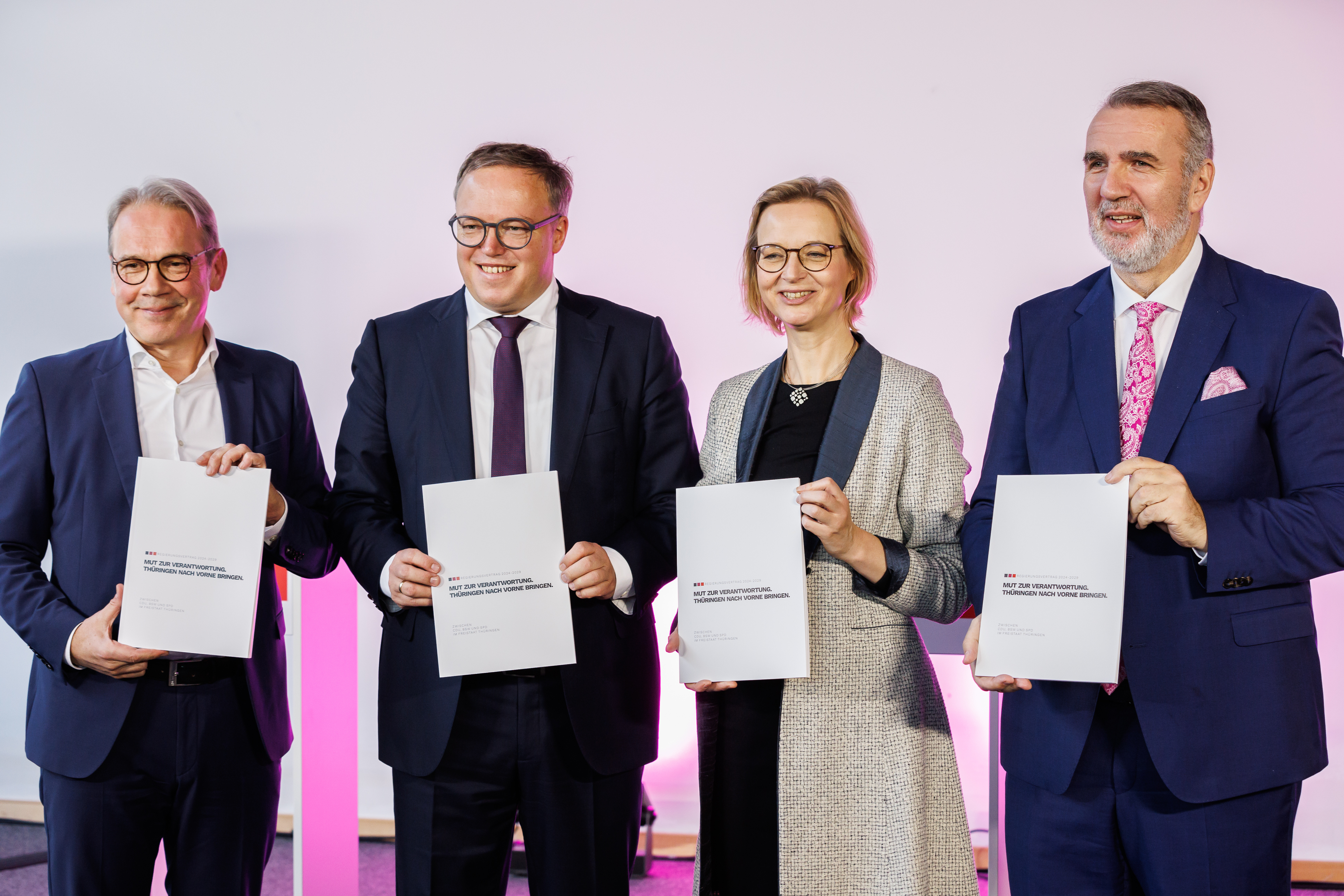
Presentation of CDU, BSW and SPD for the joint Blackberry coalition agreement (Thuringia) on 22 November 2024

A Blackberry coalition would be formed.

After the poor result for BSW in the 2025 German Federal election, Wagenknecht said in 2025, that BSWs participation in the government in Thuringia was also responsible for the fail. Wagenknecht accused state organization leader Katja Wolf of being partly responsible for the BSW's poor performance in the federal election.

In April 2025, a month-long power struggle between the Thuringian BSW and Sahra Wagenknecht was resolved. Thuringia's Deputy Prime Minister Katja Wolf remained BSW state organization leader and won a contested candidacy against state parliament member Anke Wirsing, who was supported by party founder Wagenknecht.

Wolf has no religious affiliation. She is married and has two children.

== Positions ==
According to her own statements, Wolf joined the BSW in order to weaken the AfD. After the 2024 election, she announced that the BSW Thuringia wanted to talk to all parties except the AfD about a pure coalition. A BSW-AfD coalition would have had a majority.
