= Blackberry coalition =

German political coalition

The parties involved

SPD (red)

BSW (purple)

CDU (black)

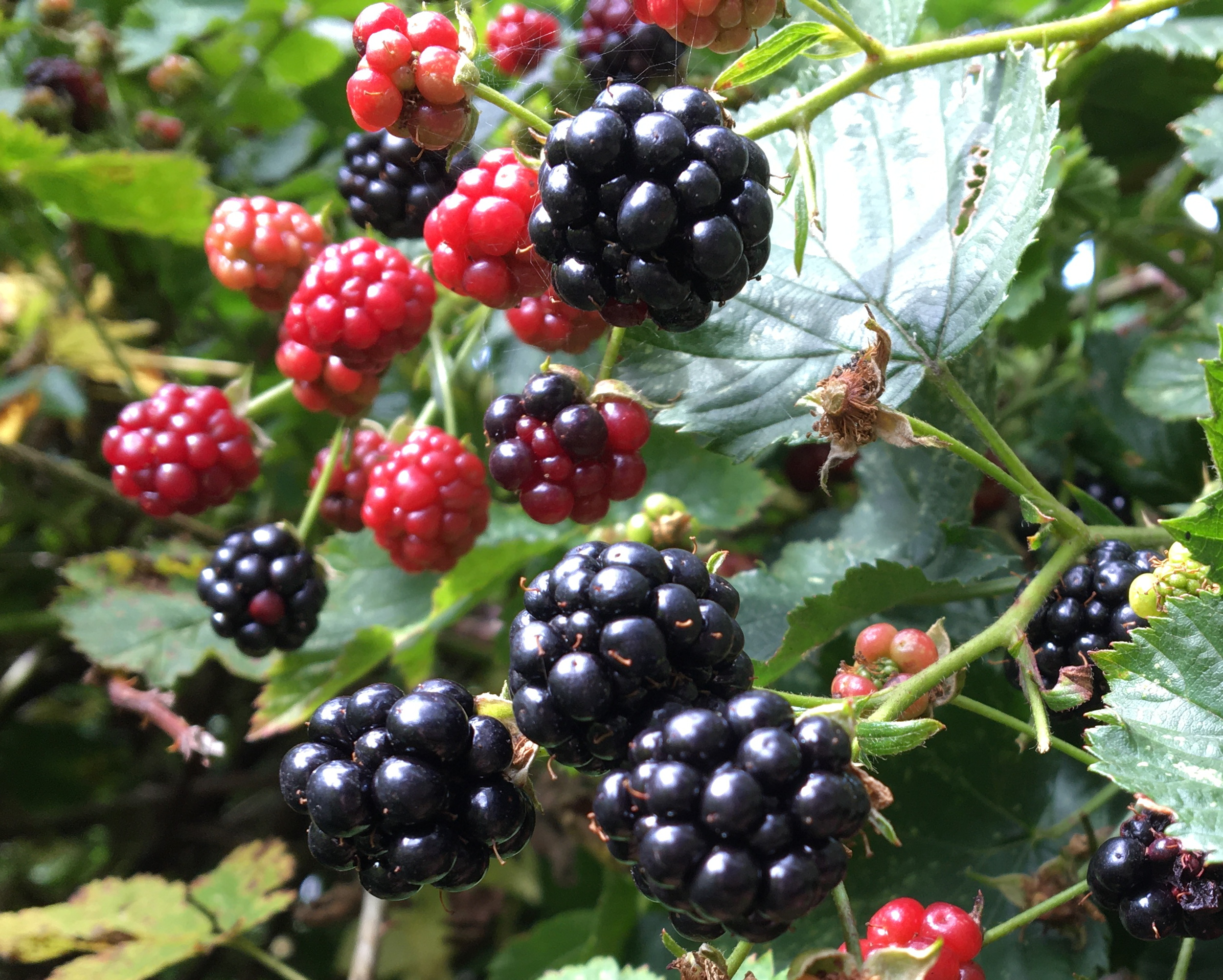
Namesake: Blackberries in different stages of ripeness

In German politics, a blackberry coalition (German: Brombeerkoalition), also called a black–purple–red coalition or red–purple–black coalition, is a governing coalition between the Christian Democratic Union of Germany (CDU, party colour black), Social Democratic Party of Germany (SPD, party colour red) and the Alliance for Social Justice and Economic Reason (BSW, party colour purple). Such arrangements were first discussed due to the mathematical possibility of such a new government coalition emerging before the state elections in Saxony and Thuringia in September 2024.

While coalition negotiations in Saxony failed, the Voigt cabinet, Germany's first blackberry coalition, governed Thuringia from December 2024 until 13 of 15 members of parliament left the BSW party in early September 2026 to continue under a different banner.

== Background ==
The term was first used in August 2024 by political scientist Karl-Rudolf Korte in a guest article in the newspaper Die Zeit. It was picked up by numerous media outlets. At the latest since the state elections in Saxony and Thuringia on 1 September 2024, it has been established as a term for a possible government coalition of the CDU, BSW and SPD. The political colours of the parties (SPD red, BSW purple, CDU black) refer to the blackberry in its different stages of ripeness.

== State level ==
=== Discussions through the state election in Thuringia (2024) ===
Already in the run-up to the state elections in Thuringia and Saxony in 2024, a possible alliance between the CDU, SPD and BSW was discussed on the basis of the surveys. CDU chairman Friedrich Merz initially rejected such an alliance, but only wanted to refer to the federal government. He wanted to give the CDU state leaders a free hand for possible cooperation. In the aftermath of the election, parts of the CDU called for an incompatibility resolution with the BSW, which would make such a coalition impossible. Another obstacle to black–purple–red cooperation is that the BSW wants to be involved in negotiations on arms deliveries to Ukraine and the stationing of American medium-range missiles in Germany in order to achieve a commitment against it from a CDU-BSW-SPD state government.

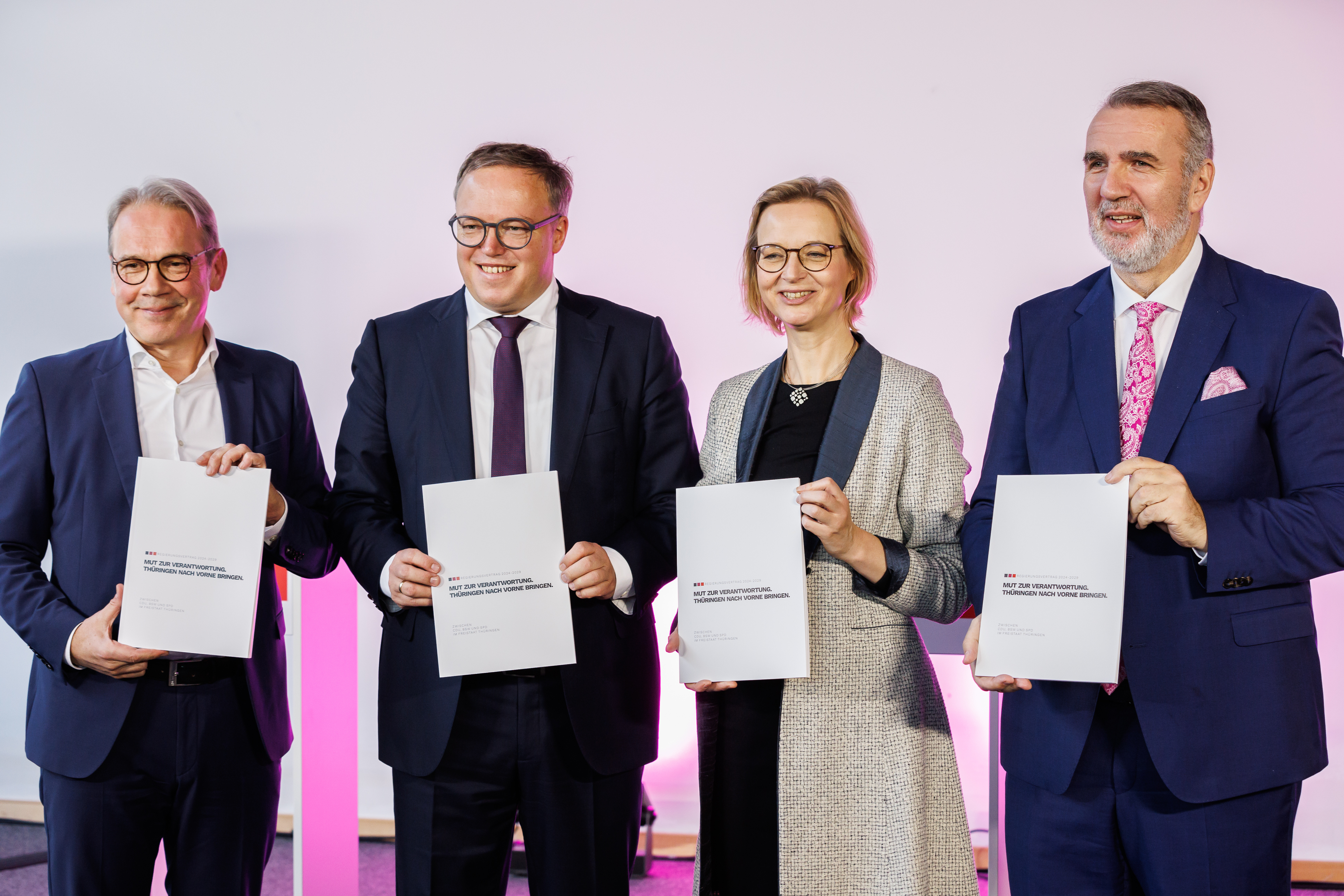
Presentation of CDU, BSW and SPD for the joint coalition agreement (Thuringia) on 22 November 2024

In Thuringia, discussions about a black–purple–red collaboration began when it became apparent that the Alliance 90/The Greens and Free Democratic Party (FDP) would not enter the Landtag of Thuringia.

The 2024 Thuringian state election resulted in a draw for the alliance in the distribution of seats (44:44), so that although it missed out on an overall majority by one seat, meaning it could not be outvoted by the opposition. In view of the lack of alternatives (incompatibility resolutions of the CDU with the Alternative for Germany (AfD) and the Left), the parties concerned entered into preliminary negotiations called "option talks" for a possible blackberry coalition.

In addition, CDU top candidate Mario Voigt held talks with BSW chairwoman Sahra Wagenknecht in Berlin. This was followed by the start of exploratory talks, coalition negotiations from the end of October 2024.

The coalition agreement entitled "Courage to take responsibility. Thuringia forward." was finally presented on 22 November 2024. It is considered likely that Die Linke will tolerate such a government without its own majority, for example by abstaining, since no additional votes are needed.

This point also distinguishes the constellation from the previous minority government in Thuringia under the left-wing leader Bodo Ramelow (see second Ramelow cabinet. With the election of Mario Voigt as Minister-President of Thuringia on 12 December 2024, the Voigt cabinet began its work as a blackberry coalition in Thuringia.

==== Intra party disputes ====
After the poor result for BSW in the 2025 German Federal election, Wagenknecht said in 2025, that BSWs participation in the government in Thuringia was also responsible for the fail. Wagenknecht accused state organization leader Katja Wolf of being partly responsible for the BSW's poor performance in the federal election.

In April 2025, a month-long power struggle between the Thuringian BSW and Sarah Wagenknecht was resolved. Thuringia's Deputy Prime Minister Katja Wolf remained BSW state organization leader and won a contested candidacy against state parliament member Anke Wirsing, who was supported by party founder Wagenknecht.

In September 2026, 13 of the 15 BSW members of the Landtag of Thuringia, as well as the entire state executive committee, left the party in protest of increased public pressure from Wagenknecht to end its participation in the Voigt cabinet. This also came days before the 6 September 2026 Saxony-Anhalt state election in which Wagenknecht advocated for the party, should it enter that Landtag despite polling under the 5% threshold, to support an independent Minister-President and end its participation in the firewall policy regarding the AfD.

=== Discussions through the state election in Saxony (2024) ===
In the September 2024 Saxony state election, which took place on the same day as the election in Thuringia, the possibility of a blackberry coalition emerged as the parties achieved a majority in the newly elected state parliament. Minister-President of Saxony Michael Kretschmer (CDU) brought this type of cooperation into discussion immediately after the election. Representatives of the parties subsequently met for negotiations called “introductory talks”. Kretschmer also travelled to Berlin to hold talks with Sahra Wagenknecht and to explore the possibility of a black–purple–red coalition. Exploratory talks began at the end of October 2024, which were temporarily suspended a few days later by the SPD because the BSW in the state parliament had voted together with the AfD for a Corona investigation committee. At the beginning of November 2024, the BSW declared the exploratory talks a failure because they could not agree “on the peace formula, migration policy and the issue of finances”.

=== Discussions through the state election in Brandenburg (2024) ===
Before the 2024 Brandenburg state election, which took place a few weeks after those in Saxony and Thuringia, there had been speculation about a possible blackberry coalition in addition to a possible majority for a continuation of the previous black–red–green coalition. As several parties lost representation in the Landtag of Brandenburg (the Greens, the Left and the BVB/Free Voters) the election resulted in a red–purple–black majority, but the CDU rejected talks for such an alliance, as the SPD and BSW alone already had a majority (red–purple coalition for the Fourth Woidke cabinet) and the inclusion of the CDU would have led to the formation of an oversized coalition. Due to five BSW members leaving the faction, and two joining the SPD in early 2026, SPD could end cooperation with BSW to form a red-black coalition with CDU for the Fifth Woidke cabinet.
