= Mario Voigt =

German politician (born 1977)

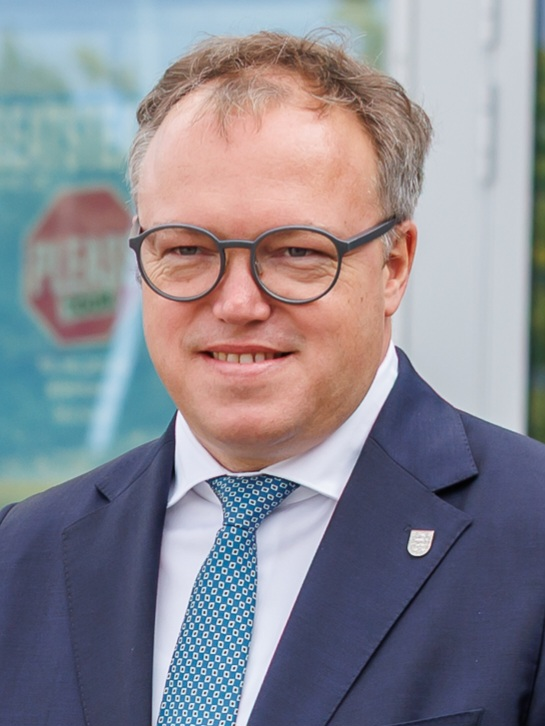
- Voigt in 2025

Minister-President of Thuringia
- Incumbent
- Assumed office 12 December 2024
- Deputy: Katja Wolf; Georg Maier
- Preceded by: Bodo Ramelow

General-Secretary of the Christian Democratic Union in Thuringia
- In office 13 November 2010 – 13 December 2014
- Succeeded by: Raymond Walk

Member of the Landtag of Thuringia
- Incumbent
- Assumed office 30 August 2009
- Preceded by: Wieland Rose
- Constituency: Saale-Holzland-Kreis II
- Majority: 7,974 (34.1%)

Personal details
- Born: 8 February 1977 (age 49) Jena, East Germany
- Party: CDU (since 1994)
- Education: Chemnitz University of Technology
- Occupation: Political scientist • Politician

Mario Voigt (born 8 February 1977) is a German politician of the Christian Democratic Union (CDU) who has been serving as the Minister-President of Thuringia since December 2024. He has also served as the leader of the CDU in the State Parliament of Thuringia (Landtag) since 2020. He has been a member of the State Parliament since 2009. He previously served as co-deputy leader of the Thuringian CDU from 2014 to 2020, and general-secretary of the party from 2010 to 2014.

== Early life and education ==
Voigt obtained his Abitur in 1995 at the Ernst-Abbe-Gymnasium in his home city of Jena. From 1995 to 1996 he did Zivildienst (community service) at the Friedrich Schiller University Hospital. He then studied political science, public law and modern history at the universities of Jena and Bonn and at the University of Virginia in the United States from 1997 to 2003. He received his PhD in political science at the Chemnitz University of Technology in 2008. He received a scholarship from the Konrad Adenauer Foundation. According to Voigt, the Chemnitz University revoked his PhD in 2025/2026 for Voigt's handling of secondary sources. Justice later confirmed the revocation of his PhD.

== Professional career ==
Voigt has worked for the political representative office of Siemens in Brussels, the political planning department of the CDU in Berlin, and the office of the Konrad Adenauer Foundation (KAS) in Washington. In 2004, he spent several months as an election observer in the United States on behalf of the KAS. At the end of 2007, he took over as head of corporate communications and investor relations for the Jena-based company Analytik Jena. He left the company in late 2009.

As a strategy consultant for the McCann-Erickson advertising agency, Voigt assisted the CDU during the 2005 federal election campaign. Since then, he has been involved in public affairs campaigns from the local to the international level in the areas of mobilization and digital campaigning. During the 2017 federal election campaign, he was the CDU's strategy consultant for mobilization. That same year, he was hired as a professor for digital transformation and politics at Quadriga Hochschule Berlin GmbH.

== Political career ==
Voigt joined the Young Union and the CDU in 1994. From 1999 to 2000, he was the first East German to become chairman of the Circle of the Christian Democratic Students. He was elected to the executive for the CDU's Saale-Holzland-Kreis district association in 2000, and became chairman in 2015. He was also elected to the district council in 2000 and chaired the CDU faction there from 2009 to 2011. From 2002 to 2009, he was a deputy member of the European People's Party executive. From 2005 to 2010, he was chairman of the Young Union's Thuringia branch.

Voigt was elected to the State Parliament of Thuringia in the 2009 election, winning the constituency of Saale-Holzland-Kreis II with 36.9% of votes cast. He served as chairman of the Committee on Education, Science, and Culture during the 2009–14 parliamentary term. He was re-elected to the Landtag in 2014 with 41.2% of votes, and again in 2019 with 34.1%. From 2014–19 he was the CDU faction's spokesman for business, science, and digitisation.

Voigt was elected general-secretary of the CDU Thuringia in November 2010. He left this position in 2014 after being elected as one of three deputy leaders of the party.

After the resignation of Mike Mohring in February 2020, Voigt was elected as leader of the CDU Landtag group in March. In November 2020, Voigt was nominated unanimously as the CDU executive's preferred candidate to lead the party in the planned 2021 Thuringian state election, though plans for the early election were ultimately scrapped.

Voigt was nominated by his party as delegate to the Federal Convention for the purpose of electing the President of Germany in 2022.

From 2022 to 2024, Voigt served as deputy chair – alongside Serap Güler – of a working group in charge of drafting the CDU’s new party platform, under the leadership of Carsten Linnemann.

On December 12, 2024, Voigt was elected Prime Minister of Thuringia. He immediately achieved an absolute majority; Left MPs probably also voted for him as his coalition of CDU, BSW, and SPD does not have its own majority.

== Political positions ==
When the CDU/CSU entered into a coalition government with the centre-left Social Democratic Party (SPD) on the national level following the 2013 elections, Voigt joined a group of young party members – including Günter Krings, Michael Kretschmer and Jens Spahn – in signing an open letter which called for changes in the CDU’s policies and leadership.

Ahead of the Christian Democrats’ leadership election in 2022, Voigt publicly endorsed Friedrich Merz to succeed Armin Laschet as the party’s chair.

== Controversy ==
=== "Stop Ramelow" campaign ===
As chairman of the Young Union (JU) in Thuringia during the 2009 state election, Voigt oversaw the group's "stop Ramelow" campaign. The association distributed media over the internet and in public targeting Bodo Ramelow and the Left party, the CDU's primary opposition. Activists also attended and disrupted Ramelow's campaign events. These actions were conducted by members without disclosing their political affiliation in order to avoid damaging the reputation of the CDU. During the course of the campaign, a local court forbade the JU from producing material which made false claims about Ramelow, such as claiming that he believed East Germany was not an Unrechtsstaat, that he wanted to reintroduce DDR-era administrative districts, or that he wanted to abolish Gymnasiums. Information about the JU's campaign strategy was leaked by WikiLeaks.

=== Police investigations into bribery ===
In September 2022, the State Parliament’s Committee on Legal Affairs lifted Voigt’s immunity amid investigations by the public prosecutor's office on suspicion of bribery. The investigators were examining whether Voigt exerted undue influence during the 2019 European election campaign to ensure that a Jena-based company was awarded a contract by the European People’s Party (EPP). In April 2023, Belgian and German police raided the Brussels headquarters of the EPP, with German media reporting that the raid was connected to an investigation into Voigt. In November 2023, the prosecution abandoned the case because the suspicion was not substantiated.

=== Doctoral thesis plagiarism ===
Voigt is accused of academic misconduct in his 2008 dissertation, "The American Presidential Election Campaign: George W. Bush vs. John F. Kerry." The initial plagiarism allegations were raised shortly before the 2024 state election. The CDU described the situation as a smear campaign. In January 2026, following an extensive review, the Technical University (TU) Chemnitz decided to revoke Voigt's doctoral degree. The university announced that the Extended Faculty Council of the Faculty of Humanities had decided unanimously. The university had been examining Voigt's doctoral thesis since mid-2024 after allegations of plagiarism were reported to it. After the faculty rejected an objection filed by Voigt, he announced in August 2026 that he would sue against the decision.

In February, after the initial revocation, the AfD launched a constructive vote of no confidence against Voigt with its leader Björn Höcke as the proposed replacement, which failed with 33 of the necessary 45 votes in favor. After the appeal was denied in August, the AfD announced its intent to propose another such vote.
