= Landtag of Thuringia =

State legislature in Germany

Coordinates: 50°57′50″N 11°02′02″E

Landtag of Thuringia Thüringer Landtag

Type
- Type: Landtag
- Established: 1920

Leadership
- President: Thadäus König, CDU since 28 September 2024

Structure
- Seats: 88
- Political groups: Government (39) CDU (23) Thüringen.Gerecht (10) (Note: Ten BSW MdLs, including party leader and deputy Minister-President Katja Wolf, left the party in the first week of September 2026 and formed their own group.) Thüringen.Gerecht (9) Independent (1) (Note: BSW MdL Matthias Herzog left the party on 1 September 2026 but remained in its parliamentary group. He then joined the Thüringen.Gerecht group at its formation but still as an independent.) SPD (6) Supported by (3) DSZ (3) (Note: BSW MdLs Dirk Hoffmeister, Roberto Kobelt and Stefan Wogawa left the party on 2 September 2026 and formed their own parliamentary group "Deine Stimme zählt" ("Your vote counts").) Opposition (46) AfD (32) The Left (12) (Note: Working with the government as a "constructive opposition" without a formal confidence and supply agreement.) BSW (2)

Elections
- Last election: 1 September 2024
- Next election: 2029

Meeting place
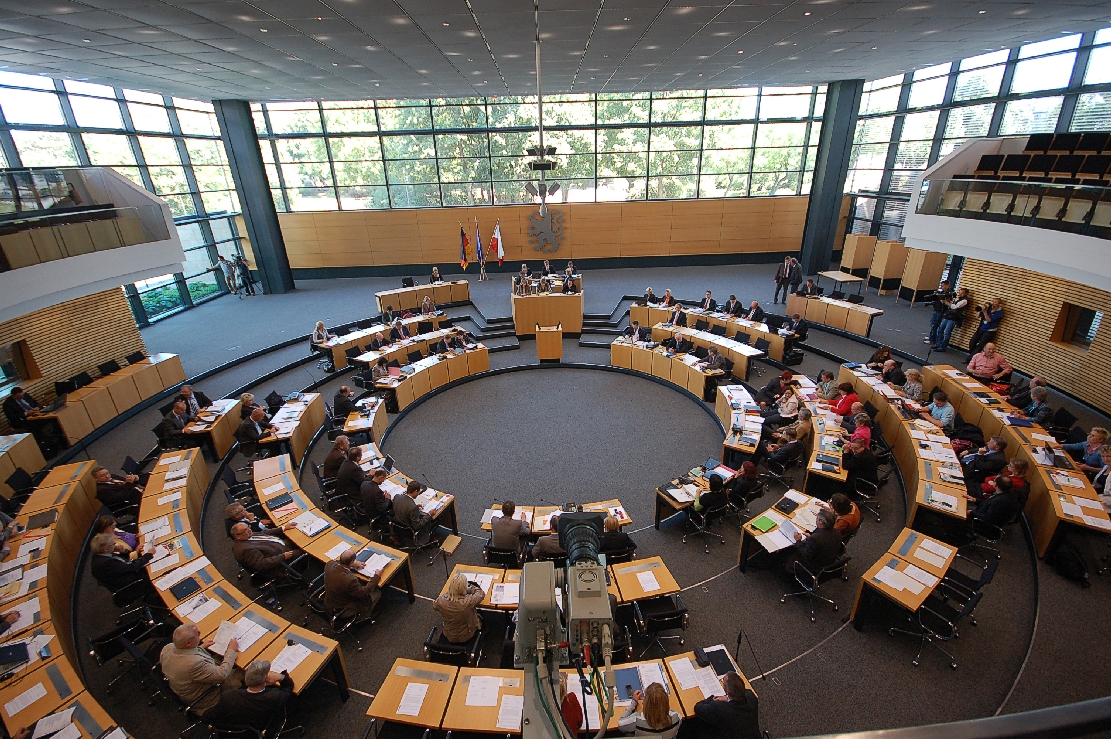
- Landtag of Thuringia, Erfurt

Website
- www.thueringer-landtag.de

The Landtag of Thuringia is the parliament of the German state of Thuringia. It convenes in Erfurt and currently consists of 88 members from five parties. According to the free state's constitution, the primary functions of the Landtag are to pass laws, elect the Minister-President and control the government of Thuringia.

== Elections ==
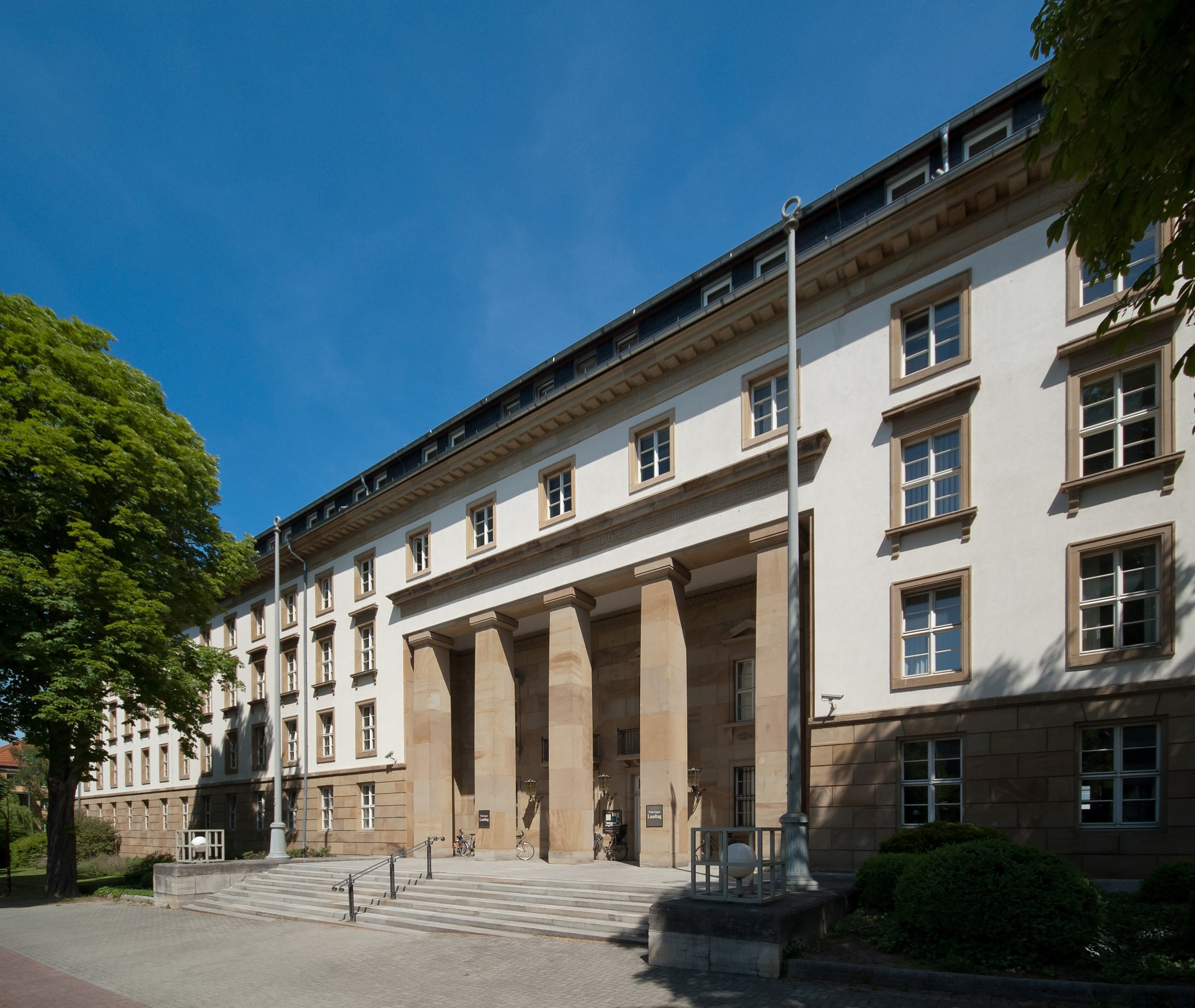
The Landtag of Thuringia (front)

Elections are held every five years using the German Mixed-member proportional representation (MMP) system, with an election threshold of 5% vote share to receive any seats. All German citizens 18 years of age or older living in Thuringia are entitled to vote. If a party wins more constituency seats than its overall share of the vote, the overall size of the Landtag increases because of these overhang and leveling mandates.

== Current composition ==
The 2024 Thuringian state election saw a significant drop in support for Die Linke, the entry of the splinter party Alliance for Social Justice and Economic Reason (BSW) into the legislature and governing coalition, and a significant rise in support for the far-right Alternative für Deutschland party.

The rise in state level representation of the AfD parallels the rise in federal representation of the AfD following the 2025 German federal election. The 2024 Thuringian election is the first time that a far-right party has obtained the most seats in a German legislature since the end of the Nazi era.

Party	Seats		Group leader
Party	2024	Current	Group leader
Alternative for Germany (AfD)	32 / 88	32 / 88	Björn Höcke
Christian Democratic Union (CDU)	23 / 88	23 / 88	Andreas Bühl
Alliance for Social Justice and Economic Reason (BSW)	15 / 88	2 / 88	None (Note: A minimum of five members is required to form a parliamentary group.)
The Left (Linke)	12 / 88	12 / 88	Christian Schaft
Social Democratic Party (SPD)	6 / 88	6 / 88	Lutz Liebscher
Thüringen.Gerecht	0 / 88	10 / 88	Sigrid Hupach
Your Vote Counts (DSZ)	0 / 88	3 / 88	None

The BSW faction had 15 members until early September 2026 saw a string of defections in protest of pressure from Sahra Wagenknecht and other federal leaders to end their participation in the coalition. On 2 September Dirk Hoffmeister, Stefan Wogawa, Roberto Kobelt left BSW to found the party Your Vote Counts. Ten more BSW members, among them leader and deputy Minister-President Katja Wolf, defected on 4 September. They formed the group Thüringen.Gerecht and also will continue supporting the government.

== Historical composition ==
1st Landtag.

2nd Landtag.

3rd Landtag.

4th Landtag.

5th Landtag.

6th Landtag.

7th Landtag.

8th Landtag.

== History ==
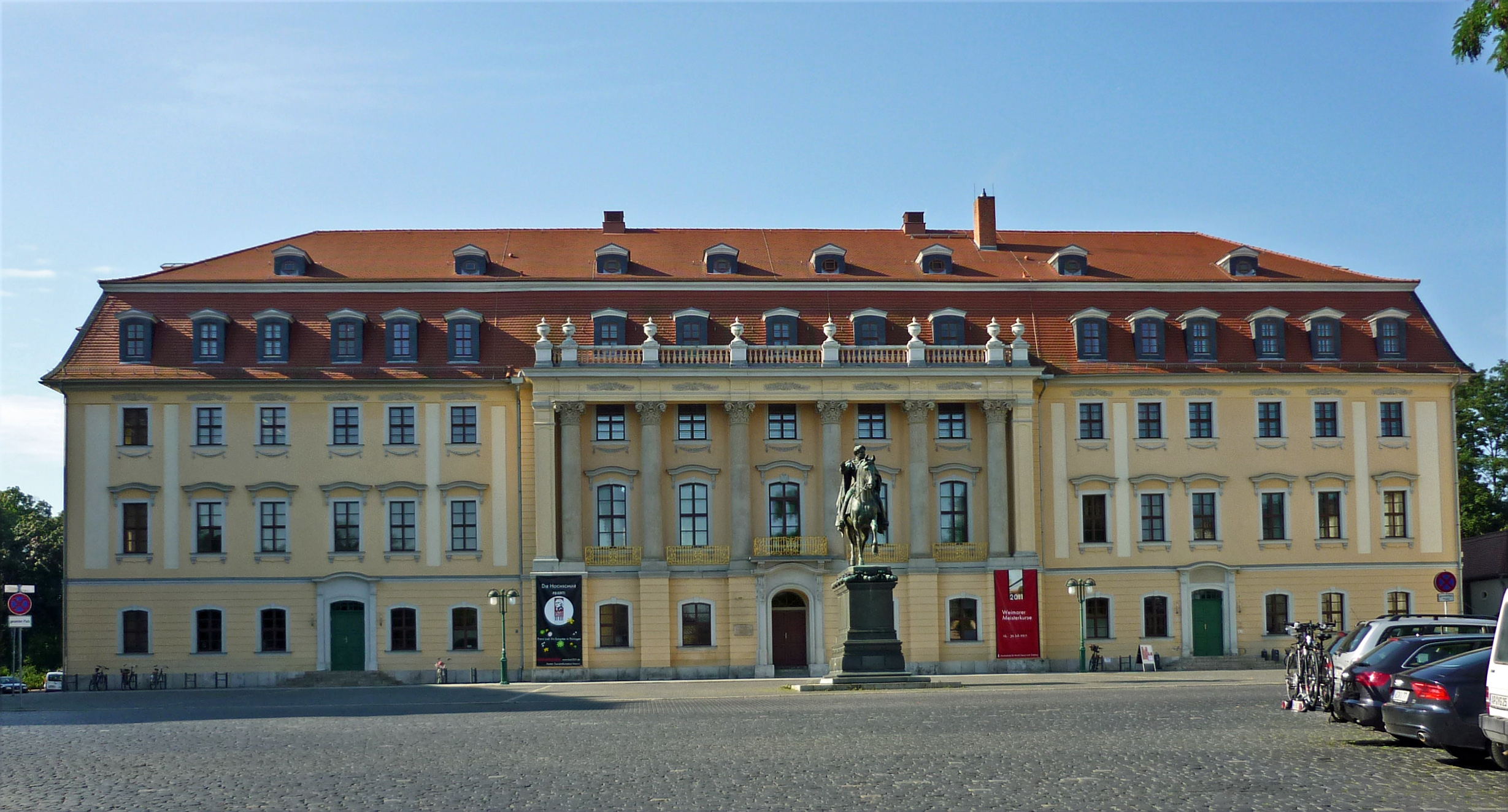
Former Thuringian Landtag (Fürstenhaus) in Weimar

The Landtag of the newly established State of Thuringia (Land Thüringen) first convened in 1920 in Weimar. Its deputies were elected for three years according to a proportional representation system, with a minimum voting age of 21. During the Weimar Republic period until 1933, six state elections were held. Upon the 1929 elections, Thuringia became one of the first German federal states where the Nazi Party gained real political power. Wilhelm Frick was appointed Minister of the Interior for the state of Thuringia after the NSDAP won six delegates to the Landtag. In the 1932 elections the Nazis emerged as the strongest party with 26 of 61 seats and Fritz Sauckel assumed the office of Minister-President. Following the Nazi seizure of power in Berlin, the Landtag was abolished in the Gleichschaltung process by the "Law on the Reconstruction of the Reich" of 30 January 1934.

After World War II, the State of Thuringia was re-established as part of the Soviet occupation zone. On 13 June 1946 the Soviet Military Administration summoned a state assembly (Landesversammlung) chaired by Ricarda Huch; the first post-war Landtag elections] were held on 20 October 1946 and the constituent meeting took place on November 21 at the Elephant hotel in Weimar. By the time of the Constitution of East Germany in 1949, the Landtage were largely deprived of power and the second state elections on 15 October 1950 were already held under the terms of the National Front unity list. In 1952, the East German government dissolved the federal states and Thuringia was divided into districts (Bezirke) centered in Erfurt, Gera and Suhl.

The Free State of Thuringia was restored during Germany's reunification and Landtag elections were again held on 14 October 1990.

After the 2019 general election there was a government crisis. It was triggered by the election of Thomas Kemmerich (FDP) as Prime Minister of Thuringia with the votes of the AfD (despite the secret ballot), on February 5, 2020. The process received a lot of attention both nationally and internationally because for the first time In the history of the Federal Republic of Germany, a prime minister came into office thanks to decisive votes from the right-wing extremist AfD.

The Thuringian state government then consisted only of the Prime Minister for four weeks. Kemmerich resigned on February 8, 2020 and was in office until Bodo Ramelow (The Left) was elected Prime Minister on March 4, 2020. After Kemmerich's election, no members were named for the German Bundesrat (Federal Council), and he himself also decided not to represent Thuringia there. Kemmerich was accused of lacking involvement in government affairs.

After the controversial election of Kemmerich, there was an announcement of the resignation of the CDU federal chairwoman Annegret Kramp-Karrenbauer, the withdrawal of the Thuringian CDU state and parliamentary group leader Mike Mohring, the dismissal of the federal government's Eastern Commissioner Christian Hirte by chancelor Angela Merkel and the failure of the FDP to meet the five percent hurdle in the 2020 Hamburg state election.

== See also ==
- Politics of Thuringia
- Constituencies of the Landtag of Thuringia
- List of presidents of the Landtag of Thuringia
- 1990 Thuringian state election
- 1994 Thuringian state election
- 1999 Thuringian state election
- 2004 Thuringian state election
- 2009 Thuringian state election
- 2014 Thuringian state election
- 2019 Thuringian state election
- 2024 Thuringian state election
