= Woidke cabinet =

Woidke cabinet is the name of any of four cabinets led by Dietmar Woidke (SPD) in the state of Brandenburg in Germany:

- First Woidke cabinet (August 2013–November 2014)
- Second Woidke cabinet (2014–2019)
- Third Woidke cabinet (2019–2024)
- Fourth Woidke cabinet (2024–January 2026)
