= 2020 Thuringian government crisis =

Government crisis in Thuringia, Germany

Composition of the Landtag of Thuringia after the 2019 state election The Left (Die Linke): 29 seats Social Democratic Party (SPD): 8 seats Alliance 90/The Greens (Grüne): 5 seats Free Democratic Party (FDP): 5 seats Christian Democratic Union (CDU): 21 seats Alternative for Germany (AfD): 22 seats

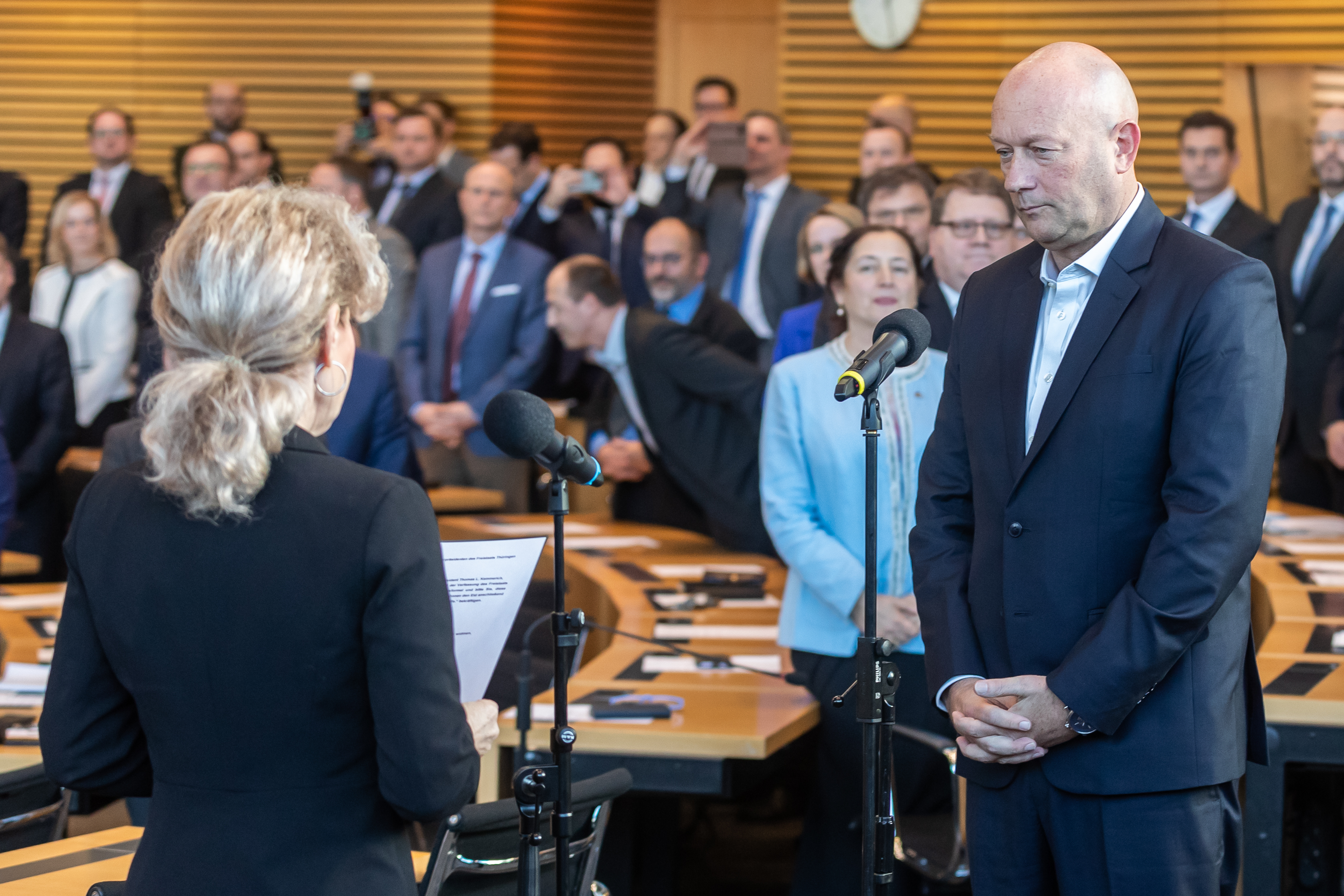
Kemmerich being sworn in by Birgit Keller, President of the Landtag

The 2020 Thuringian government crisis, also known as the Thuringia crisis, was triggered by the election of Thomas Kemmerich (FDP) as Thuringian Minister President with votes from the AfD, CDU and FDP on 5 February 2020. The election attracted considerable national and international attention because, for the first time in the history of the Federal Republic of Germany, a Minister President was elected with votes from a far-right populist party, in this case the AfD.

On 8 February 2020, Kemmerich resigned and served in an acting fashion until Bodo Ramelow was elected Minister President on 4 March 2020. After Kemmerich's election, no members were appointed to the Bundesrat, and he himself also decided not to represent Thuringia there. For four weeks thereafter, the Thuringian State Government consisted only of the Minister President. Kemmerich was accused of neglecting participation in government business.

The crisis was also a consequence of the 2019 Thuringian state election, in which no established government coalition in Germany won a majority. Following Kemmerich's controversial election, federal CDU leader Annegret Kramp-Karrenbauer announced her resignation, as did Mike Mohring, the Thuringian CDU state and parliamentary group leader; Christian Hirte, Commissioner of the Federal Government for the New States, was dismissed, and the FDP failed to clear the 5 percent threshold in the 2020 Hamburg state election.

== 2019 Thuringian state election ==
=== Initial situation ===
Before the October 2019 election, the Left party, led by Minister President Bodo Ramelow, was in power in a red-red-green coalition state government. After the election, the Left remained the strongest force in parliament, but the coalition no longer held an absolute majority of seats in parliament. The CDU and FDP proposed a so-called "Zimbabwe" coalition (black-red-yellow-green), but this also failed to gain a majority. Since none of the parties represented in the state parliament wanted to enter into negotiations with the AfD faction led by Björn Höcke, there was little prospect of a government coalition with a parliamentary majority. The only theoretical majority alliances publicly discussed by at least one party were red-red-green plus FDP and a coalition of The Left with the CDU. In the run-up to the elections, the media also discussed the possibility that Bodo Ramelow could only continue to hold the office of Minister President in an acting fashion, without a new parliamentary election.

=== Cooperation talks ===
The Thuringian CDU showed internal disagreement after the state elections in 2019. While two members of the Landtag and some local politicians proposed a rapprochement with the AfD, others favored talks with the former Minister President Bodo Ramelow. These included Mike Mohring, the state chairman of the CDU in Thuringia. At the end of October, he visited the federal chairwoman of the CDU, Annegret Kramp-Karrenbauer, with the intention of meeting with Ramelow afterwards. She reminded him that the CDU continued to consider the "incompatibility of cooperation with the Left Party" and that Mohring's contact with Ramelow was only a "parliamentary matter of course."

Already at the end of October, the FDP stated that it would not form a coalition with either the AfD or the Left Party.

A meeting between Ramelow and Mohring on 12 January 2020 yielded no new insights into how and whether the parliamentary opposition could support Ramelow, nor did a meeting between politicians from all state parliamentary factions except the AfD on 13 January 2020.

After the election, Minister President Bodo Ramelow declared that he, with the support of the Left Party, would fight for a continuation of the red-red-green coalition. The three previous governing parties signed a government treaty on 4 February to continue the red-red-green alliance as a minority government. The parties involved relied on situational parliamentary cooperation with the CDU and the FDP.

== Election of the Minister President in February 2020 ==
=== Nomination of the candidates ===
The Left Party, the SPD and the Greens nominated the incumbent Minister President Bodo Ramelow as their candidate. CDU and FDP had no candidate as they had no majority of their own, and did not want to get elected with AfD support.

The AfD faction proposed a largely unknown candidate, Christoph Kindervater, the part time mayor of small village Sundhausen. Kindervater had previously made his mark by writing a letter to the members of the CDU, FDP and AfD factions of parliament in order to run for the office of Minister President in Thuringia. He had run for the Unstrut-Hainich district council in 2019 on the CDU list and called himself a supporter of the Values Union, then still part of CDU.

The FDP faction decided to let their faction and state chairman Thomas Kemmerich run in the third ballot, if Bodo Ramelow failed twice before. According to their own statements, this was rather a symbolic candidacy to offer a "civic alternative" to the two candidates from left and right. However, they only wanted to run if the AfD continued to send its own candidate in order to avoid receiving votes from the AfD, because they assumed that the AfD would continue to vote for its own candidate. The day after the election, Kemmerich admitted in an interview in Heute Journal that the opposite should have been expected. However, the FDP ruled out cooperation or agreement with the AfD at any time. At the same time, there was no plan for the next steps in the formation of a government.

In the days leading up to the election, the press sometimes discussed the possibility "that a candidate from the CDU or FDP could win in the third round of voting with the support of the AfD". On the day before the election, Wolfgang Tiefensee, head of the SPD in Thuringia, warned the Mitteldeutsche Zeitung newspaper that such a "dam burst" would be "a serious damage to democracy" and as such would "radiate far beyond Germany." In the FDP parliamentary group in the Bundestag, the situation in Thuringia was briefly discussed before the election and Christian Lindner warned against being dependent on votes from the AfD, but the representative of the FDP Thuringia pointed out that this was an internal matter. Moreover, according to his own statements, nobody had expected that the AfD would not vote for its own candidate. According to media reports, however, CDU federal chair Annegret Kramp-Karrenbauer had asked FDP state leader Mohring and Lindner for Kemmerich not to run.

=== Election of Kemmerich as Minister President ===
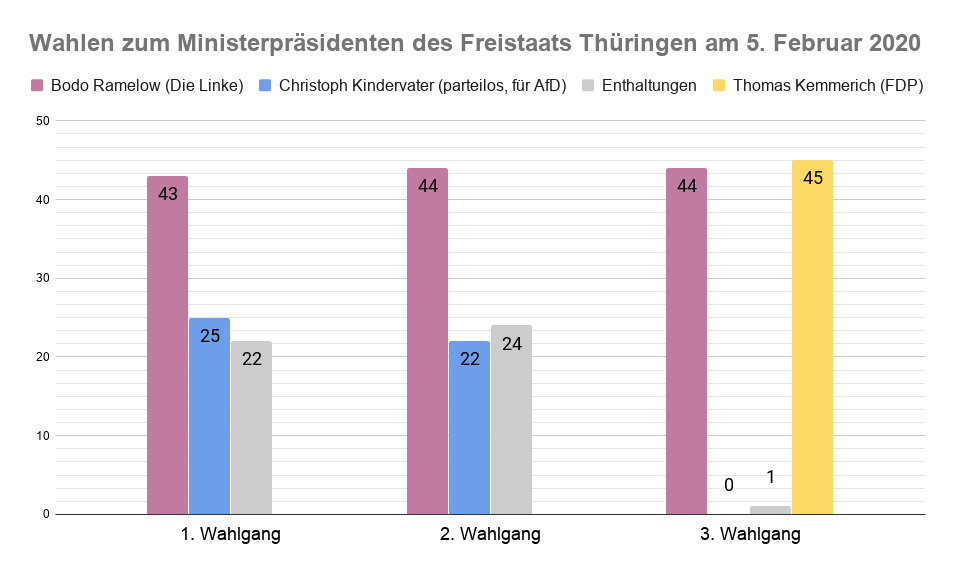
Results of the three rounds of voting for the election of the Minister President

The Thuringian constitution provides that in the first two rounds of voting, the Minister President is elected by an absolute majority of the members of the state parliament. If this does not succeed, the third round of voting takes place. In this round, the candidate with the most votes is considered elected. Whether a Minister President with fewer yes votes than no votes can be elected is disputed.

In the first round of voting, Bodo Ramelow won 43 votes, one more than the Left, SPD and Greens had combined in seats. Christoph Kindervater received 25 votes and thus at least three votes from outside the AfD. 22 members of the Landtag abstained. This made a second round of voting necessary, as both candidates had missed the absolute majority of 46 votes. In the second round of voting, Ramelow received 44 votes and Kindervater 22 votes, which corresponded exactly to the number of AfD deputies. 24 members of the Landtag abstained from voting.

For the third round of voting which was necessary as a result, the AfD faction maintained Kindervater's candidacy, and in addition, as announced for this case, Thomas Kemmerich was nominated by the FDP faction. Kemmerich received 45 votes, Bodo Ramelow 44 and Kindervater 0 votes, one Member abstained. Kemmerich was thus elected the new Thuringian Minister President. The result of the secret ballot shows that the AfD had apparently voted unanimously for Kemmerich despite Kindervater's candidacy being upheld, along with most of the FDP and CDU members of parliament. This tactical approach was later confirmed by the AfD.

Kemmerich accepted the election without hesitation and was sworn in. Later, Christian Lindner justified this by saying that Kemmerich had been "overwhelmed" by the situation. After Reinhold Maier, he was thus the second elected FDP Minister President of a state in the history of the Federal Republic of Germany, but at the same time the first Minister President ever to come from the ranks of the smallest parliamentary group in the Landtag and to rely on votes from the AfD for his election. In terms of electoral law, the election of the Minister President was formally flawless; however, there was a consensus between the Union parties and the FDP on the one hand and the Left, SPD and Greens on the other hand, both in Thuringia and throughout Germany, not to enter into a coalition with the AfD, led in Thuringia by Björn Höcke, a politician considered by most to be on the extreme right-wing.

Immediately after the election, Kemmerich again ruled out any cooperation with the AfD and instead offered the CDU, SPD and Greens to form a non-partisan cabinet together. However, this was immediately rejected by them. Instead, the previous red-red-green coalition gave him an ultimatum to resign. Even together with the CDU, SPD and Greens, the FDP would have only had 39 of the 90 seats in the state parliament anyway. Kemmerich renounced the subsequently planned appointment of ministers and requested on behalf of the FDP faction that the state parliament session be adjourned indefinitely. This was granted with the votes of AfD, CDU and FDP, against the votes of Left, SPD and Greens.

=== Government management ===
The ministers of the acting Ramelow cabinet resigned from their posts when Kemmerich took office. Since Kemmerich did not appoint any new ministers, he was the only member of the state government. The ministries were temporarily headed by the state secretaries appointed under Ramelow, and there were no cabinet meetings.

No members were appointed to the Bundesrat, and no representative of Thuringia was present at the only meeting of the Bundesrat during Kemmerich' short term. The Conference of Interior Ministers, which had been chaired by Georg Maier, Thuringia's Minister of the Interior, since the beginning of 2020, was temporarily returned to its previous chairman, Hans-Joachim Grote (Minister of the Interior of Schleswig-Holstein).

According to state law experts Michael Meier and Robert Wille (research assistants at the University of Potsdam) and Matthias Friehe (EBS University), the ministers of the Ramelow cabinet continued to hold executive office from a legal point of view, as the Thuringian state constitution stipulates that ministers continue their activities until their successors take office. The State Secretaries remained in office:

State Chancellery and Ministries	State Secretaries
State Chancellery	Babette Winter; Culture and Europe
State Chancellery	Malte Krückels; Media; Representative to the Federal Government
Ministry of the Interior and Local Government	Udo Götze
Ministry of the Interior and Local Government	Uwe Höhn
Ministry for Education, Youth and Sport	Gabi Ohler
Ministry for Migration, Justice and Consumer Protection	Sebastian von Ammon
Ministry of Finance	Hartmut Schubert
Ministry for Economy, Science and Digital Society	Markus Hoppe; Science and Universities; Head of office
Ministry for Economy, Science and Digital Society	Valentina Kerst; Economy and Digital Society
Ministry of Labour, Social Affairs, Health, Women and Family	Ines Feierabend
Ministry for the Environment, Energy and Nature Conservation	Olaf Möller
Ministry for Infrastructure and Agriculture	Klaus Sühl

=== Reception ===
==== Politicians ====
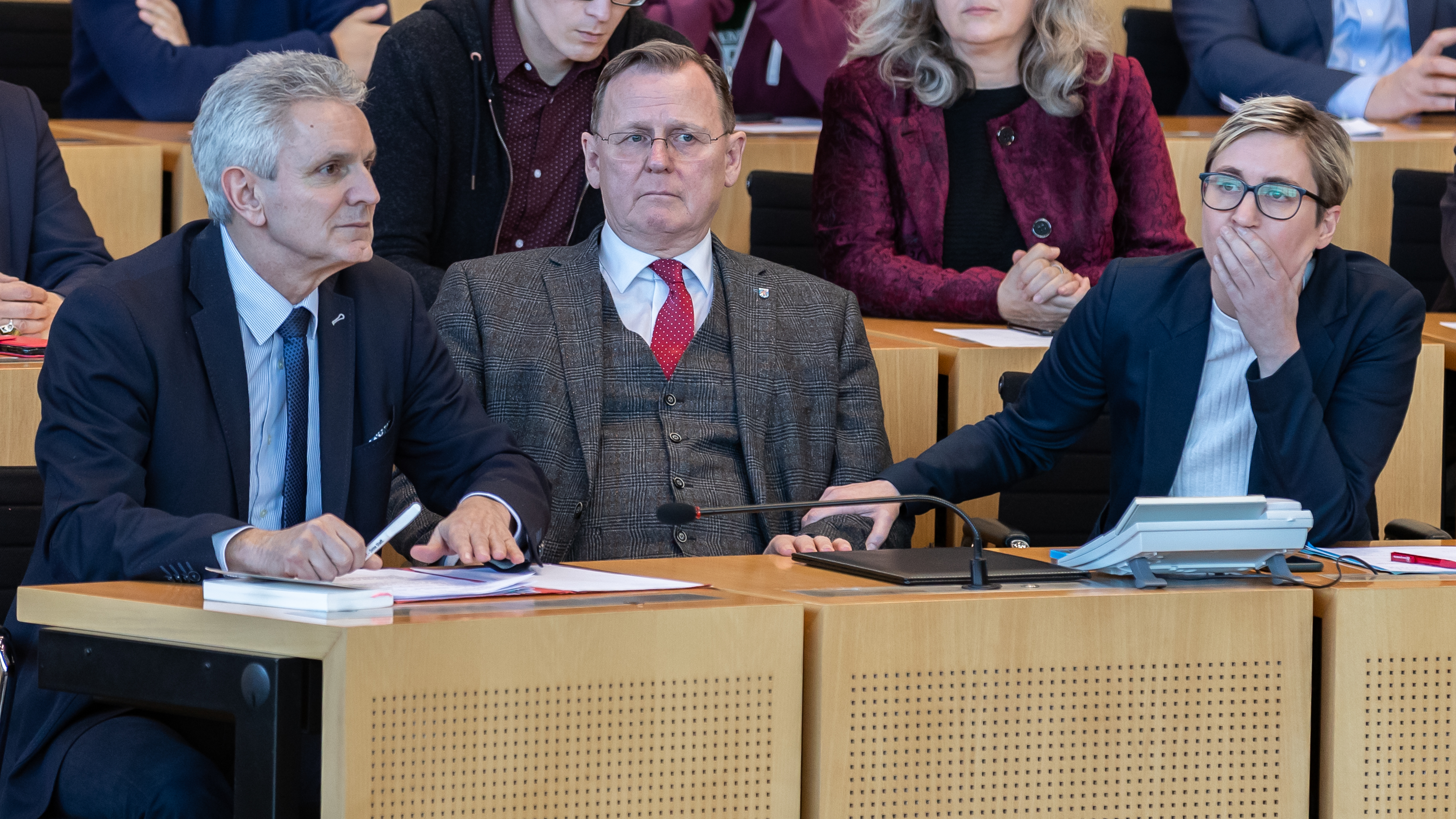
André Blechschmidt, Bodo Ramelow, and Susanne Hennig-Wellsow at the announcement of the results of the 3rd round

After the swearing-in, the leader of the Left parliamentary group, Susanne Hennig-Wellsow, refused to shake hands with Thomas Kemmerich and threw the bouquet of flowers intended for Ramelow at his feet. During his inaugural speech, the Left party shouted "charlatan" and "hypocrite" while demonstrators spontaneously gathered in front of the parliament building and the FDP party headquarters in Berlin.

Ramelow submitted a tweet on the day he was voted out of office, drawing parallels with the formation of the Baum-Frick government in Thuringia in 1930. This tweet was controversially received, as it was illustrated by a photo of Höcke congratulating Kemmerich and of Hitler bowing to Reich President von Hindenburg on the so-called Day of Potsdam in 1933, and was deleted after a few days.

Stefan Möller, spokesman for the AfD Thuringia, said of the election process: "That was the whole point of the strategy. So we tried to lure Mr Kemmerich onto the podium as the opposing candidate. That is what he did. And then we elected him according to plan."

Outside of Thuringia, Kemmerich's election initially met with spontaneous approval from right-wing groups, especially from the AfD, the conservative Values Union, and parts of the FDP. Initially, the deputy federal chairman of the FDP, Wolfgang Kubicki, told the Deutsche Presse-Agentur that he was delighted that "a candidate from the democratic centre" had won, in view of the decision of the "majority of members in the Thuringian state parliament". He said he saw this as an opportunity to "promote a sensible policy for Thuringia." That same evening, FDP party leader Christian Lindner declared: "Who [...] supports our candidates in a secret ballot is not in our power." AfD party leader Jörg Meuthen wrote that the result was the "first piece of the mosaic of the political turnaround in Germany."

However, the election results and Kemmerich's acceptance of the election soon caused a considerable stir nationwide, as well as criticism from top politicians, including the FDP. Current and former leading FDP politicians such as Gerhart Baum, Marie-Agnes Strack-Zimmermann, Alexander Lambsdorff and Joachim Stamp demanded his immediate resignation. Christian Lindner also finally asked him to resign, describing it as a mistake "to have accepted an election under these conditions". He emphasized that there would be "no cooperation with the FDP that was intended and negotiated, but also not accidentally, by mistaken [sic] with the AfD."

CDU leader Annegret Kramp-Karrenbauer said that cooperation with Kemmerich would be a violation of the party line that excludes any cooperation with the AfD, as he would not have been able to take office without their votes. Chancellor Angela Merkel also spoke in connection with Kemmerich's election of an "unforgivable event" that would have to be reversed. CSU leader Markus Söder, who called the election "unacceptable", and SPD leader Norbert Walter-Borjans, who called it a "scandal of the first order", expressed similar sentiments. Green Party leader Annalena Baerbock called on Kemmerich to resign immediately, and Left Party leader Bernd Riexinger, like many political commentators, spoke of a "dam breaking."

The reactions of the Thuringian CDU members of the Landtag varied widely. In response to the question "Why did you do this?" which was asked by Die Zeit, most of them stated afterwards that they had given their vote to Kemmerich as the "candidate of the middle". One CDU member, Raymond Walk, commented that they had not expected "that the AfD would sacrifice its own candidates in such cold blood". Another, Beate Meißner, said: "I cannot say that I would be happy about Kemmerich's election. However, I could not have expected the AfD to behave in this way. Neither would I have trusted them with so much perfidiousness in parliament to put up a sham candidate, nor would I have believed that they would act so cohesively. Probably that's the Führerprinzip."

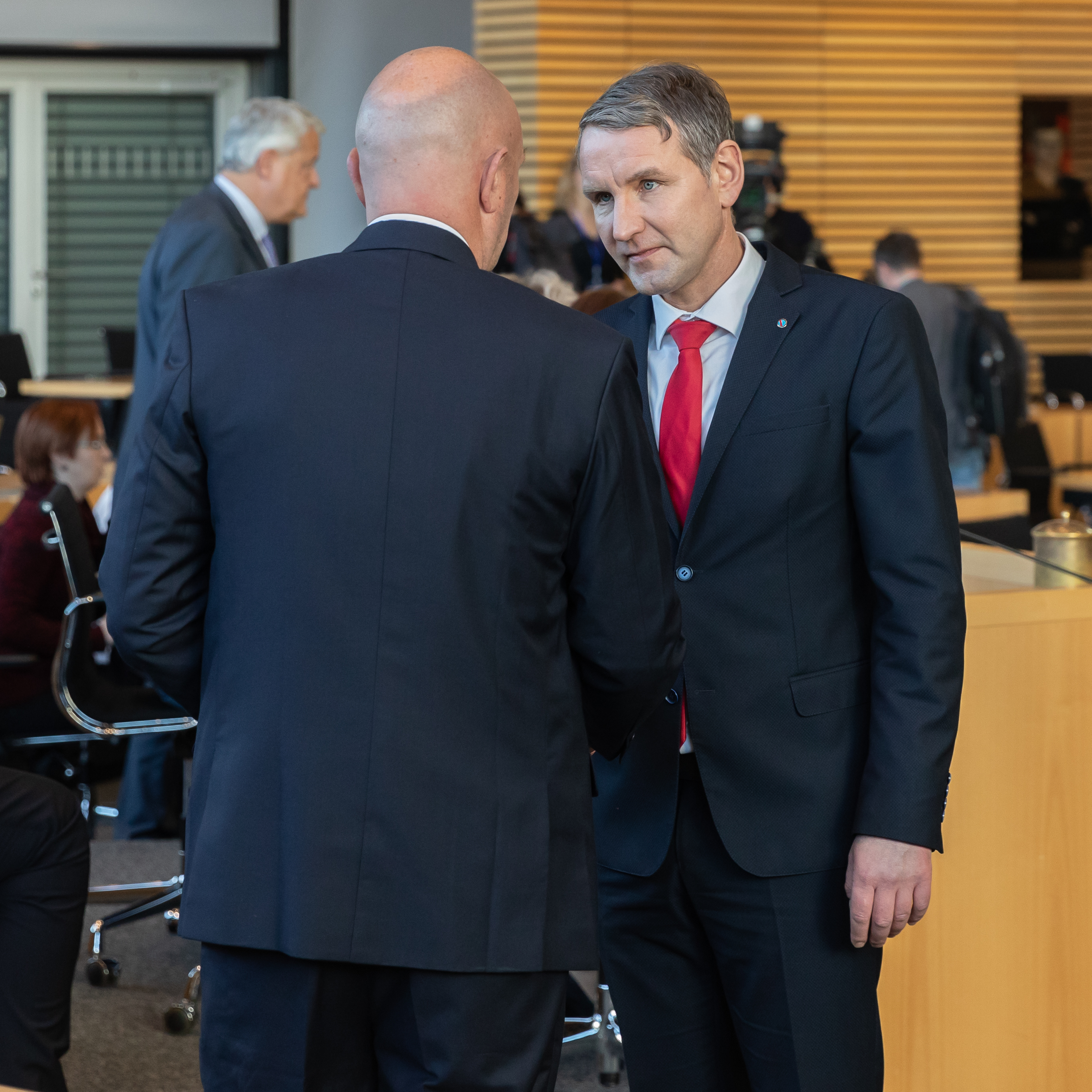
Björn Höcke congratulates Kemmerich on his election.

Other CDU members of the Landtag, such as Jörg Kellner and Michael Heym, do not regret in retrospect either that they elected Kemmerich or that he accepted the election, but deplore his resignation, for which they blame the pressure from federal politics. Martin Henkel said that he had hoped "to enable an alliance of CDU, FDP and SPD through the election of the Minister President." On the other hand, there are a few who claimed to have warned of the outcome of the election – in addition to faction leader Mike Mohring, especially Thadäus König, but also Thomas Gottweiss.

Dieter Althaus, former CDU Minister President of Thuringia, sharply criticised his party's behaviour and accused it of "political dilettantism." The Values Union, whose membership figures, according to its own statements, rose sharply after Kemmerich's election, congratulated him on his election victory, whereupon calls for a resolution of incompatibility with it were made within the CDU. The federal chairman of the Values Union, Alexander Mitsch, then called it a scandal that "in the party of Konrad Adenauer and Helmut Kohl, some members would rather have a Left politician as Minister President than an FDP politician."

Guy Verhofstadt, former Belgian Prime Minister and leader of the Alliance of Liberals and Democrats for Europe group in the European Parliament, described Kemmerich's election as "unacceptable."

Wolfgang Schäuble (CDU), President of the Bundestag, criticized the events in Erfurt and the reaction of federal politics to the election of the Minister President. "The way in which elections, as with elected members of parliament, the election of a prime minister, i.e. a constitutional body, has been dealt with is not appropriate in our parliamentary democracy. Democracy thrives on the fact that we respect the procedures and the institutions, this applies to everyone, and this has been violated in Erfurt in many ways."

==== Political scientists and historians ====
The political scientist André Brodocz said that the FDP "as a defender of civil rights, as a defender of minorities, opens up at this point to cooperation with a party that has different ideas there." To withdraw to the idea that in a secret ballot one does not know who voted and not to recognize that this "is also a form of cooperation" seems "either politically naive or completely ignorant." According to the political scientist Michael Koß, the events are a "case of flight from the Republic" because the exclusion of totalitarian or extremist forces has been the "basis of the Federal Republic's business." Per Koß, at the federal level, the FDP would rather not govern than govern wrongly, but now it would be willing to accept being elected by the "Höcke-AfD." The CDU, who had been "sceptical" about cooperating with the Left Party, was now cooperating "at least indirectly" with the AfD. The role of the AfD would be significantly enhanced by this "coup", said political scientist Uwe Jun. The historian Norbert Frei criticized Kemmerich's "recklessness" with which he had put himself in danger of being elected by "declared anti-democrats" as a "scandal." Herfried Münkler saw a "crisis of political personnel" and attested the CDU and FDP either "a remarkable lack of scruples" or "technical naivety": "This shows that we are dealing with people who are not up to real tasks, neither in tactical nor in strategic terms.

The political scientist Hajo Funke considered the events to be a "breach of taboo", but did not see a "breach of the dam;" rather, due to the outraged reactions of many people, the dam had become even higher. According to Funke, "the AfD has moved even further away from a perspective of power." According to the historian Volker Weiß, the AfD votes for an FDP Minister President were irritating at first glance, but Mr. Höcke is trying to "change his image" and wants to "offer himself as a serious partner". Regarding the debates about a possible toleration of a government by the AfD, the political scientist Albrecht von Lucke said that the Union was thereby promoting precisely a "civicization strategy" of the AfD. This would "brilliantly conceal the increasing radicalisation of the party." The historian Winfried Süß called the events "devastating" and Kemmerich's behaviour "history-forgotten." The strong political polarization reminded Süß of the conditions at the end of the Weimar Republic. The democratic protective wall had been damaged, but dams could be "closed again" and the "political sewage" could be "pumped out."

The Jena political scientist Torsten Oppelland, on the other hand, saw the election as largely unproblematic. He explained that an election by the AfD did not have to mean any further cooperation with it, and that the Greens and the SPD had a duty to cooperate with Kemmerich. The Dresden political scientist Werner J. Patzelt evaluated Kemmerich's election as proof of a failed strategy in dealing with the AfD and stated: "The CDU is now paying the price for its policy of having released the right-wing fringe." According to the historian Hannes Heer, the events represent a "turning point within the discussion in the Federal Republic in dealing with the past", but are "not comparable with Weimar". This republic had been unstable, there had been economic crises and a "post-war society with tens of thousands of armed highly motivated Freikorps men." He attested the CDU and FDP a "real abyss of stupidity."

==== Journalists ====
Journalists described Kemmerich's election as "irresponsible," as "political disgrace," as "boundless opportunism," and "a historic break" but also as "an expression of democratic normality." According to Pascal Beucker, Kemmerich's attempt to distance himself from the anti-democratic right is "purely rhetorical." Beucker further stated that Kemmerich is a party functionary who stands "for a renaissance of those long suppressed, tightly national-liberal times of the FDP before the social-liberal turn at the end of the 1960s" and that means "ideologically wide open to the right."

Benedict Neff, Germany correspondent of the Swiss newspaper NZZ, on the other hand, saw no reason to morally condemn the election and concluded: "This is democracy." It was occasionally pointed out that not only Kemmerich lacked a suitable concept for dealing with AfD, but also other established parties. According to Guido Bohsem, the real aim of the AfD is "the destruction of the established". Johannes Boie commented: "The AfD is the only party that has achieved its goal."

==== Others ====
Josef Schuster, President of the Central Council of Jews in Germany, was "appalled" by the election. He said that "the FDP is thus leaving the consensus of the democratic parties." Christoph Heubner of the International Auschwitz Committee spoke of a "breaking of the dam and taboo in Germany". The fact that "precisely this right-wing extremist Höcke-AfD has so easily managed to present the democratic parties as incapable of consensus is a political disaster with far-reaching consequences," said Heubner. Bishops and leading clergymen of the Protestant state churches of the new states expressed similar criticism, since "from a Christian point of view [...] there must be no government with the participation of right-wing extremists."

Demonstrations against the election of Kemmerich on the same day, called by the parties The Left, SPD and the Greens as well as other organizations, brought together several thousand people in at least 15 German cities, 6 of them in Thuringia. There were also demonstrations in the following days. On 15 February 2020, between 9,000 and 18,000 people took to the streets in Erfurt once again against Kemmerich's election under the motto "Not with us – No pact with fascists."

These events led to the cancellation of the "Regional Conference German Sustainability Strategy 2020" in Erfurt.

Since his election as Minister President, Kemmerich has been exposed to organized "hatred in the form of threatening letters and mass mailings," according to the FDP state executive board. A "direct and immediate threat" has led to the fact that, in addition to the usual personal protection for the Minister President, his home and children are now also protected. In numerous other places throughout Germany, FDP politicians also faced massive threats and attacks as a result of the election. Several party headquarters of the FDP were graffitied with slogans and damaged. In some cases, police protection had to be provided. The interior politician Konstantin Kuhle spoke of an "absolute escalation." The NRW headquarters of the CDU in Düsseldorf was also vandalized.

=== Kemmerich resigns as Minister President ===
On 6 February 2020, the day after the election, Christian Lindner went to Thuringia to persuade Thomas Kemmerich to resign, which he also tied to continuing his own office as party chairman. Thereupon, Thomas Kemmerich announced his resignation at a press conference on the same day. The FDP parliamentary group announced that it would support a motion to dissolve the parliament under Article 50 of the state constitution. Should this motion be unsuccessful, Kemmerich announced a vote of confidence under Article 74 of the Thuringian state constitution, which would have cleared the way for a new election.

After the coalition committee of the CDU, CSU and SPD in the federal government, in consultation with the FDP, also demanded his immediate resignation on February 8, Kemmerich resigned on the same day with immediate effect. However, he remained in office as acting Minister President until the election of a new Minister President on March 4.

Kemmerich also announced that he would waive his salary as Minister President and the transitional allowance to be paid at the end of his term of office. This would have amounted to at least 93,000 euros in total. If this was not possible, he said, he would donate anything beyond his parliamentary salary to Thuringian organizations, such as the Association of Victims of Stalinism or the Arbeitsgemeinschaft zur Aufarbeitung der SED-Diktatur. When criticism was voiced that former AfD members were also active in the former association, he withdrew his announcement in this regard. After Bodo Ramelow was re-elected as his successor, it was clear that the total payments (including transitional allowance and payment for the whole of March) to Kemmerich would amount to approximately 110,000 euros.

== Political consequences ==
=== Federal and state level of the CDU ===
In the CDU, the electoral behaviour of the Thuringian state association made the internal party differences in dealing with the AfD particularly clear. CDU state chairman Mike Mohring had initially defended the election of Thomas Kemmerich despite massive criticism. After a visit by the CDU presidium in Erfurt, he announced his resignation as CDU faction chair. It was not known whether Mohring actively supported Kemmerich's election. On 2 March 2020, Mario Voigt was elected the new parliamentary party leader of the CDU Thuringia. Mohring also relinquished the chairmanship of the state CDU association.

The Federal Government Commissioner for the New States, Christian Hirte (CDU), who had congratulated Kemmerich on his election via Twitter, asked for his dismissal as Parliamentary State Secretary on 8 February 2020 on the advice of the Chancellor. This was then carried out.

Annegret Kramp-Karrenbauer announced her resignation from the office of federal CDU chairwoman on February 10, saying that the decision had "matured some time ago". Most media also saw the resignation as the result of a longer development.

=== Federal and state level of the FDP ===
On 7 February, the Federal Chairman Christian Lindner asked the Federal Executive Board for a vote of confidence. He had been exposed to ongoing criticism of his reaction to the election of the Minister President because he had initially welcomed the acceptance of the election by FDP candidate Kemmerich despite the apparent support of AfD members of parliament. In a statement, he then admitted that Kemmerich's candidacy had already been a mistake. The FDP board expressed its confidence in Lindner.

In the wake of Kemmerich’s highly controversial election, which was made possible by support from the AfD, the FDP failed to clear the 5 percent threshold in the 2020 Hamburg state election, receiving 4.9 percent of the vote, and, for the first time since the 2008 Hamburg state election, failed to re-enter the Hamburg Parliament as a parliamentary group.

After Kemmerich posted online on 9 October 2020, stating that it was not he who had made a mistake by accepting his election, but rather other politicians who had erred in the way they handled the matter, the Executive Committee of the federal FDP unanimously distanced itself from his remarks and announced that it would not support him in any way during the next state legislative election campaign.

In June 2021, Kemmerich was re-elected as state chairman of the FDP in Thuringia.

=== Election polls ===
Immediately after Thomas Kemmerich's election as Minister President, opinion research institutes in Thuringia conducted election polls which revealed clear shifts in favor of the Left and losses of the CDU. According to several polls, the FDP, which had barely reached the five percent hurdle in the state election, would only get four percent and would no longer be represented in the state parliament.

Institute	Date	CDU	SPD	Grüne	FDP	Linke	AfD	Others
2019 state election	27 October 2019	21.7 %	8.2 %	5.2 %	5.0 %	31.0 %	23.4 %	5.1 %
INSA	6 February 2020	19 %	6 %	6 %	7 %	34 %	23 %	5 %
Forsa	7 February 2020	12 %	9 %	7 %	4 %	37 %	24 %	7 %
Infratest dimap	10 February 2020	13 %	10 %	5 %	4 %	39 %	24 %	5 %
INSA	14 February 2020	14 %	7 %	6 %	4 %	40 %	25 %	4 %

== Approaches to overcoming the government crisis ==
=== New elections ===
One possible way out of the government crisis was to dissolve parliament and hold new elections. According to Article 50 of the Thuringian State Constitution, one third of the members of the Landtag should have submitted a motion to this effect and a two-thirds majority should have approved it.

New elections were demanded, for example, by the black-red coalition at federal level. After a meeting of the coalition committee chaired by Angela Merkel on 8 February 2020, the federal chairmen Norbert Walter-Borjans, Saskia Esken (both SPD), Annegret Kramp-Karrenbauer (CDU) and Markus Söder (CSU) called for new elections to the Thuringian state parliament. It is a novelty in German politics that the leaders of the parties involved in the federal government have called for the election of a new state parliament. As an explanation they gave "reasons for the legitimacy of politics."

In connection with Kemmerich's announcement of his resignation, the FDP faction at state level announced that it would support a motion to dissolve parliament under Article 50 of the state constitution. The CDU faction in the state parliament, however, was critical of new elections.

Another point of criticism in new elections was the long period of time until a new government was formed. Thuringia's state constitution stipulates that new elections must be held within 70 days of the dissolution of the state parliament. Since Kemmerich is now only acting Minister President, he would not have been able to ask for a vote of confidence or appoint ministers during that time. In this context, Bodo Ramelow (The Left) warned of a "fundamental state crisis" and a "political deadlock."

According to the Thuringian state constitution, it is not possible to dissolve the state parliament by referendum, as is the case in Berlin, for example.

=== Election of a new Minister President ===
The election of a new Minister President could replace Thomas Kemmerich in the office of Minister President. To this end, a constructive vote of no confidence was initially considered by the Left Party, the SPD and the Greens. With Kemmerich's resignation, a normal election became possible. Several candidates were considered for this.

The Left, SPD, and Greens wanted to elect Bodo Ramelow as Minister President, as originally planned. As in the election on 5 February 2020, they would have needed four additional votes from the CDU or FDP to do so. Alexander Gauland, leader of the AfD faction in the Bundestag, recommended that the Thuringian AfD faction elect Mr. Ramelow in a forthcoming election, in order to "certainly prevent him – because he would then not be allowed to accept the office either." Torben Braga, the parliamentary managing director of the AfD faction in the Thuringian state parliament, objected to this proposal and stated that the AfD had elected Kemmerich for reasons of content, not just to prevent Ramelow. The parliamentary group of the Left party in the state parliament rejected a candidacy of Ramelow if there was no firm promise from the CDU or FDP to support the candidacy with the necessary votes.

This was offset by calls for another candidate. The chairperson of the CDU, Annegret Kramp-Karrenbauer, suggested that the SPD and the Greens should nominate their own candidate "who does not divide the state, but unites it." Politicians such as Volker Bouffier (CDU) or Christian Lindner (FDP), on the other hand, called for a politically independent personality to be elected Minister President, who should prepare new elections in an expert government. Both variants met with rejection from the Left, SPD and the Greens. Jacques Schuster, the chief commentator for Die Welt, welcomed the proposal, commenting that Bodo Ramelow's attempt to form a red-red-green government led by the Left party, despite the lack of a parliamentary majority, was the real core of the problem. Karin Prien and Daniel Günther (CDU), on the other hand, saw the CDU's symmetrical distancing from the Left and AfD as "the root of the evil." Cooperation with the Left party should not be ruled out. Finn Rütten commented in Stern that equating the AfD and the Left Party (horseshoe theory) would in no way do justice to the situation in Thuringia. Rütten's opinion was that while Björn Höcke was spreading nationalistic ideas and was only satisfied with the absolute majority, the Left Party had been showing for decades that it was involved in shaping democratic, responsible policies when it came to participation in government. Party researcher Michael Lühmann interpreted the cultivation of sweeping hostility towards the Left as a "life lie" of the east-german CDU, in order to distract from its own past as a bloc party.

=== Technical transitional government under Lieberknecht ===
On 17 February 2020, representatives of the Left, SPD, Greens and CDU met for the first time for negotiations with the aim of finding a joint solution to avert the "incipient state crisis" (Ramelow quote).

Bodo Ramelow proposed a solution in this round in which new elections and the election of a new Minister President would be directly linked. The state parliament should decide on its own dissolution, and at the same time elect Christine Lieberknecht (CDU) as Minister President for the legislative period remaining until the new elections. He also suggested that Lieberknecht should form a "technical" government in which three key ministries would be reappointed: the Ministry of Justice, the Ministry of Finance, and the State Chancellery. Christine Lieberknecht had gained respect across party lines during her time as President of the Landtag (1999-2004) and has relevant government experience as former Minister President of Thuringia (from 2009 to 2014).

The CDU Thuringia rejected this and suggested that Lieberknecht should remain in office longer than Ramelow had intended and lead a full cabinet of experts. Lieberknecht thereupon withdrew her willingness to run as interim minister president and announced that she had only wanted to accept Ramelow's proposal for a solution with quick new elections. This "contradiction with the CDU" could "not be resolved." In Lieberknecht's opinion, true political stability in the Thuringian parliament could only be achieved by recognizing the real majority situation and by agreeing on reliable parliamentary cooperation between the CDU and the Left.

== Election for Minister President in March 2020 ==
=== Agreement on Ramelow as Minister President ===
On 21 February 2020, the Left Party, SPD, Greens and CDU agreed on measures to overcome the government crisis. This was in response to the CDU's request for a postponement of the new elections, as well as to the Red-Red-Green's plan to temporarily re-elect Ramelow as Minister-President.

The cooperation of the four parties provided for Bodo Ramelow to be elected Minister President on 4 March 2020 and to lead a minority government of Left, SPD, and Greens. In return, it was agreed that new elections to the Landtag would not take place until 25 April 2021. A so-called "stability mechanism" was to ensure a functioning government during this period: the CDU undertook to coordinate all motions in the state parliament with the government parties beforehand in order to rule out that CDU, FDP and AfD together block the government. At the same time, the Left, SPD, and Greens were also to come to an agreement with the CDU in advance on plans. The state budget for 2021 should also be drawn up in this way.

Both with this agreement, and with Kemmerich's election previously, which was a cooperation with the AfD, the CDU Thuringia violated an incompatibility decision of the federal party, which excluded any cooperation with the Left and AfD. The federal level of the CDU therefore rejected the compromise. Its Secretary-General Paul Ziemiak said that it was "about the [...] fundamental convictions and values [of the CDU] and not about political games." Mike Mohring contradicted, "that the group does not refuse stable conditions and will accept offers from others for a stable situation."

=== Listing of candidates ===
Left, SPD and Greens nominated Bodo Ramelow as candidate, as stated in the agreement reached with the CDU.

Two days before the election of the Minister President, the AfD declared that its parliamentary group leader Björn Höcke would run against Ramelow. According to its parliamentary faction leader Torben Braga, the intention is to reveal the voting behaviour of the CDU and FDP, because if Ramelow "should receive more than the 42 votes of the red-red-green camp and be elected as Minister President, it should be clear to every observer that these votes did not come from the AfD. The CDU and FDP would have thus "broken their promise not to elect Ramelow and not to allow a continuation of the red-red-green coalition."

The FDP faction announced it would boycott the election to make it clear that they reject both candidates (Ramelow and Höcke).

On the morning of the election, Ramelow declared that he had asked the CDU faction to abstain from voting, as it made no sense "to burn CDU members of parliament in the first ballot with Höcke's candidacy and the irresponsible disappearance of the FDP." A plurality would therefore suffice in the third round of voting.

=== Election of Ramelow as Minister President ===
As in the election for Minister President in February 2020, the Thuringian constitution provides that in the first two rounds of voting, the Minister President is elected by an absolute majority of the members of the state parliament. If this is not successful, the third round of voting takes place. In this round, the candidate with the most votes is considered elected.

In both the first and second rounds of voting on 4 March 2020, Bodo Ramelow received 42 votes, which should have come from the parliamentary groups of the Left, SPD and Greens. Björn Höcke received 22 votes, which corresponded to the parliamentary strength of the AfD. The 21 abstentions in each case were to be attributed to the CDU faction. The FDP was present at the election, but did not vote.

In the third round of voting, the AfD parliamentary group withdrew the candidacy of Björn Höcke, leaving Bodo Ramelow as the only remaining candidate. Ramelow received 42 votes in favour, 23 (Note: Meaning all 22 AfD members and one additional representative from the CDU or FDP voted against Ramelow) against and 20 abstentions. He was thus re-elected Minister President.

In his inaugural speech, Ramelow expressed his pleasure at the end of the government crisis, thanked the CDU in particular for concluding the stability pact, and called on the parliamentary groups in the state parliament to cooperate constructively. He sharply criticized the AfD for setting a trap for the FDP and CDU, accusing them of not respecting the parliament and democracy. He also justified it by saying that he had refused to shake hands with Björn Höcke, who wanted to congratulate him. He said that he would only shake his hand if Mr. Höcke stopped "trampling democracy underfoot" and instead defended it.

=== Reactions ===
The General Secretary of the SPD, Lars Klingbeil, expressed his relief about the election of Ramelow. He wrote on Twitter: "The chaos in Thuringia has come to an end for the time being. I am very glad that another taboo break by the FDP and CDU has not occurred." Katja Kipping, the federal chairwoman of the Left party, expressed similar sentiments; Germany could learn from Thuringia that the political right wing would not win against a "genuine alternative based on solidarity." FDP leader Lindner thanked Ramelow for having criticized the tactics of the AfD during Kemmerich's election in his inaugural speech.

The AfD, on the other hand, expressed criticism. Federal spokesman Jörg Meuthen accused CDU and FDP of having helped a Left politician into office by abstaining or not participating in the debate. The FDP, on the other hand, emphasized that by refusing to participate in the election, they had expressed their rejection of both candidates. Björn Höcke criticized that the new Minister President had shown lack of manner by refusing to shake hands. He had wanted to show Ramelow that he accepted his democratic election. In the Süddeutsche Zeitung, however, Boris Herrmann wrote of Ramelow's "well-founded gesture" and a "symbolic deed, perhaps even one for the history books." Höcke was "not just any AfD politician, but the leader of that wing that has obviously set itself the goal of undermining the system from the far right." His "programmatic approach, his poisoned language and his undignified tactics in the state parliament" made it clear that he "just did not want to belong".

== Further developments ==
The Landtag election scheduled for 25 April 2021, based on the stability pact, was initially postponed to 26 September 2021, due to the COVID-19 pandemic. On 16 July 2021, this date was also cancelled because several members of the CDU and later also of the Left had announced that they would not agree to the dissolution of the state parliament necessary for new elections, and the parliamentary groups of the Left and the Greens did not want to make the decision dependent on the votes of the AfD. The governing parliamentary groups of the Left, SPD and Greens declared that they would not make any further attempt to dissolve the Landtag.

A few days later, the AfD parliamentary group in the Thuringian state parliament filed a motion of no confidence against Ramelow and proposed Björn Höcke as the new Minister President. In the vote on 23 July 2021, 22 deputies voted for the motion and 46 against. The CDU parliamentary group had previously announced that it would not participate in the secret ballot and remained seated in the chamber. Because the motion was rejected, Ramelow remained Thuringia's Minister President. AfD deputy Stefan Möller had previously told the Deutsche Presse-Agentur that he saw no chance of success, saying, "The vote of no confidence is not aimed at Bodo Ramelow," but "primarily in the CDU's corner and marginally also in the direction of the FDP."

The AfD accused Chancellor Angela Merkel of violating her duty of neutrality as a public official with her critical remarks regarding Kemmerich’s election in February 2020, and filed a constitutional complaint with the Federal Constitutional Court. An oral hearing on the complaint took place on 21 July 2021. On 15 June 2022, the Federal Constitutional Court ruled that the Chancellor’s statements had violated the AfD’s right to equal opportunity.
