= Nordhausen I =

German electoral constituency

Nordhausen I is an electoral constituency (German: Wahlkreis) represented in the Landtag of Thuringia. It elects one member via first-past-the-post voting. Under the current constituency numbering system, it is designated as constituency 3. It comprises the entirety of the district of Nordhausen with the exception of the city of Nordhausen, which compromises the constituency of Nordhausen II.

Nordhausen I was created in 1990 for the first state election. Since 2019, it has been represented by Birgit Keller of The Left.

== Geography ==
As of the 2019 state election, Nordhausen I covers the entirety of the Nordhausen district except for the city of Nordhausen. It comprises the municipalities of Bleicherode, Ellrich, Görsbach, Großlohra, Harztor, Heringen/Helme, Hohenstein, Kehmstedt, Kleinfurra, Lipprechterode, Niedergebra, Sollstedt, Urbach, Werther, and the village of Buchholz (since 2018 part of Nordhausen municipality).

== Members ==
The constituency was held by the Christian Democratic Union (CDU) from its creation in 1990 until 2019, during which time it was represented by Klaus Zeh (1990–1994) and Egon Primas (1994–2019). It was won by The Left in 2019, and by the AfD in 2024, and is represented by Joerg Prophet.

Election	Member	Party	%
1990	Klaus Zeh	CDU	40.7
1994	Egon Primas	CDU	43.2
1999	Egon Primas	CDU	47.5
2004	Egon Primas	CDU	41.7
2009	Egon Primas	CDU	29.0
2014	Egon Primas	CDU	33.0
2019	Birgit Keller	LINKE	32.3
2024	Joerg Prophet	AfD	37.3

== Election results ==
=== 2024 election ===
State election (2024): Nordhausen I
Notes:	Blue background denotes the winner of the electorate vote. Pink background denotes a candidate elected from their party list. Yellow background denotes an electorate win by a list member, or other incumbent. A ✓ or ✗ denotes status of any incumbent, win or lose respectively.						
Party	Candidate	Votes	%	±%	Party votes	%	±%
AfD	Joerg Prophet	9,494	40.3	▲17.0	7,993	33.5	▲11.6
CDU	Carolin Gerbothe	8,793	37.3	▲8.5	5,933	24.9	▲1.9
BSW					4,322	18.1	
Left	Tim Rosenstock	3,379	14.4	▼17.9	3,089	12.9	▼21.7
SPD	Juliane Schinkel	1,877	8.0	▼0.3	1,260	5.3	▼2.7
Greens					345	1.4	▼1.9
APT					238	1.0	▼0.2
FDP					225	0.9	▼3.1
FW					123	0.5	
Familie					121	0.5	
BD					83	0.3	
Values					57	0.2	
Pirates					44	0.2	Steady
ÖDP					24	0.1	▼0.2
MLPD					18	0.1	▼0.2
Informal votes		589			257		
Total valid votes		23,543			23,875		
Turnout		24,132	72.0	▲9.4			
AfD gain from Left	Majority	701	3.0				

=== 2019 election ===
State election (2019): Nordhausen I
Notes:	Blue background denotes the winner of the electorate vote. Pink background denotes a candidate elected from their party list. Yellow background denotes an electorate win by a list member, or other incumbent. A ✓ or ✗ denotes status of any incumbent, win or lose respectively.						
Party	Candidate	Votes	%	±%	Party votes	%	±%
Left	Birgit Keller	7,009	32.3	▲1.0	7,533	34.6	▲3.3
CDU	Carolin Gerbothe	6,256	28.8	▼4.2	5,000	23.0	▼8.2
AfD	René Strube	5,054	23.3		4,776	21.9	▲13.3
SPD	Dagmar Becker	1,793	8.3	▼6.6	1,737	8.0	▼6.1
Greens	Rüdiger Neitzke	868	4.0	▼0.5	816	3.7	▼0.3
FDP	Otmar Ganter	653	3.0	▼2.8	879	4.0	▲0.3
MLPD	Conrad von Pentz	78	0.4		59	0.3	
List-only parties					972	4.5	
Informal votes		372			311		
Total valid votes		21,711			21,772		
Turnout		22,083	62.6	▲11.7			
Left gain from CDU	Majority	753	3.5				

=== 2014 election ===
State election (2014): Nordhausen I
Notes:	Blue background denotes the winner of the electorate vote. Pink background denotes a candidate elected from their party list. Yellow background denotes an electorate win by a list member, or other incumbent. A ✓ or ✗ denotes status of any incumbent, win or lose respectively.						
Party	Candidate	Votes	%	±%	Party votes	%	±%
CDU	✓ Egon Primas	6,131	33.0	▲4.0	5,803	31.2	▲0.7
Left	Angela Hummitzsch	5,802	31.3	▲3.7	5,829	31.3	▲2.8
SPD	Dagmar Becker	2,765	14.9	▼8.0	2,622	14.1	▼7.1
AfD					1,596	8.6	
Free Voters	Uwe Wenkel	1,131	6.1		422	2.3	▲0.6
FDP	Franka Hitzing	1,068	5.8	▼5.7	683	3.7	▼5.0
NPD	Alexander Lindemann	830	4.5	▲0.4	656	3.5	▼0.4
Greens	Christian Darr	828	4.5	▼0.4	747	4.0	▼0.9
List-only parties					257	1.4	
Informal votes		360			300		
Total valid votes		18,555			18,615		
Turnout		18,915	50.9	▼5.1			
CDU hold	Majority	329	1.7	▲0.3			

=== 2009 election ===
State election (2009): Nordhausen I
Notes:	Blue background denotes the winner of the electorate vote. Pink background denotes a candidate elected from their party list. Yellow background denotes an electorate win by a list member, or other incumbent. A ✓ or ✗ denotes status of any incumbent, win or lose respectively.						
Party	Candidate	Votes	%	±%	Party votes	%	±%
CDU	✓ Egon Primas	6,509	29.0	▼12.7	6,859	30.5	▼12.2
Left	Birgit Keller	6,203	27.7	▼2.3	6,403	28.5	▼0.5
SPD	Dagmar Becker	5,130	22.9	▲4.1	4,761	21.2	▲5.4
FDP	Franka Hitzing	2,557	11.4	▲5.4	1,948	8.7	▲4.7
Greens	Heinrich Christian Lorenz	1,089	4.9	▲1.4	1,089	4.8	▲1.7
NPD	Mark Richter	929	4.1		889	4.0	▲2.4
List-only parties					514	2.3	
Informal votes		417			371		
Total valid votes		22,417			22,463		
Turnout		22,834	56.1	▲5.4			
CDU hold	Majority	306	1.3	▼10.4			

=== 2004 election ===
State election (2004): Nordhausen I
Notes:	Blue background denotes the winner of the electorate vote. Pink background denotes a candidate elected from their party list. Yellow background denotes an electorate win by a list member, or other incumbent. A ✓ or ✗ denotes status of any incumbent, win or lose respectively.						
Party	Candidate	Votes	%	±%	Party votes	%	±%
CDU	✓ Egon Primas	8,639	41.7	▼5.8	8,801	42.7	▼6.9
PDS	Birgit Keller	6,206	30.0	▲7.7	5,971	29.0	▲8.7
SPD	Dagmar Becker	3,899	18.8	▼7.9	3,249	15.8	▼7.8
FDP	Franka Hitzing	1,244	6.0	▲4.5	816	4.0	▲3.1
Greens	Horst Kox	717	3.5		646	3.1	▲1.9
List-only parties					1,117	5.4	
Informal votes		817			922		
Total valid votes		20,705			20,600		
Turnout		21,522	50.7	▼9.5			
CDU hold	Majority	2,433	11.7	▼9.1			

=== 1999 election ===
State election (1999): Nordhausen I
Notes:	Blue background denotes the winner of the electorate vote. Pink background denotes a candidate elected from their party list. Yellow background denotes an electorate win by a list member, or other incumbent. A ✓ or ✗ denotes status of any incumbent, win or lose respectively.						
Party	Candidate	Votes	%	±%	Party votes	%	±%
CDU	✓ Egon Primas	11,998	47.5	▲4.2	12,573	49.6	▲6.0
SPD	Dagmar Becker	6,741	26.7	▼5.3	5,990	23.6	▼9.0
PDS	Ursula Fischer	5,635	22.3	▲4.7	5,147	20.3	▲4.8
REP	Andreas Links	502	2.0		150	0.6	▼0.5
FDP	Claus-Peter Roßberg	391	1.5	▼2.0	231	0.9	▼1.7
List-only parties					1,253	4.9	
Informal votes		454			377		
Total valid votes		25,267			25,344		
Turnout		25,721	60.2	▼15.3			
CDU hold	Majority	5,257	20.8	▼9.5			

=== 1994 election ===
State election (1994): Nordhausen I
Notes:	Blue background denotes the winner of the electorate vote. Pink background denotes a candidate elected from their party list. Yellow background denotes an electorate win by a list member, or other incumbent. A ✓ or ✗ denotes status of any incumbent, win or lose respectively.						
Party	Candidate	Votes	%	±%	Party votes	%	±%
CDU	Egon Primas	12,915	43.2	▲2.5	13,182	43.7	▲1.3
SPD		9,524	31.9	▲10.2	9,795	32.5	▲6.4
PDS		5,279	17.7	▲4.4	4,706	15.6	▲4.3
Greens		1,107	3.7	▼5.8	840	2.8	▼4.7
FDP		1,047	3.5	▼4.6	784	2.6	▼6.7
List-only parties					870	2.9	
Informal votes		1,131			826		
Total valid votes		29,872			30,177		
Turnout		31,003	75.5	▲8.3			
CDU hold	Majority	3,391	11.3	▼7.7			

=== 1990 election ===
State election (1990): Nordhausen I
Notes:	Blue background denotes the winner of the electorate vote. Pink background denotes a candidate elected from their party list. Yellow background denotes an electorate win by a list member, or other incumbent. A ✓ or ✗ denotes status of any incumbent, win or lose respectively.						
Party	Candidate	Votes	%	±%	Party votes	%	±%
CDU	Klaus Zeh	10,857	40.7		11,416	42.4	
SPD		5,790	21.7		7,014	26.1	
PDS		3,543	13.3		3,038	11.3	
Greens		2,537	9.5		2,027	7.5	
FDP		2,163	8.1		2,495	9.3	
Independent		988	3.7				
DSU		557	2.1		242	0.9	
UFV		249	0.9		152	0.6	
List-only parties					524	1.9	
Informal votes		773			549		
Total valid votes		26,684			26,908		
Turnout		27,457	67.2				
CDU win new seat	Majority	5,067	19.0				
