= Eichsfeld I =

Electoral constituency in Thuringia, Germany

Eichsfeld I is an electoral constituency (German: Wahlkreis) represented in the Landtag of Thuringia. It elects one member via first-past-the-post voting. Under the current constituency numbering system, it is designated as constituency 1. It comprises the western part of the district of Eichsfeld, including its capital Heilbad Heiligenstadt.

Eichsfeld I was created for the 1994 state election, replacing constituency Heiligenstadt – Worbis II, which covered much of the same area. Since 2019, it has been represented by Thadäus König of the Christian Democratic Union (CDU).

== Geography ==
As of the 2019 state election, Eichsfeld I covers the western part of Eichsfeld district. It comprises the municipalities of Arenshausen, Asbach-Sickenberg, Berlingerode, Birkenfelde, Bodenrode-Westhausen, Bornhagen, Brehme, Burgwalde, Dieterode, Dietzenrode/Vatterode, Ecklingerode, Eichstruth, Ferna, Freienhagen, Fretterode, Geisleden, Geismar, Gerbershausen, Glasehausen, Heilbad Heiligenstadt, Heuthen, Hohengandern, Hohes Kreuz, Kella, Kirchgandern, Krombach, Leinefelde-Worbis (excluding Hundeshagen), Lenterode, Lindewerra, Lutter, Mackenrode, Marth, Pfaffschwende, Reinholterode, Rohrberg, Röhrig, Rustenfelde, Schachtebich, Schimberg, Schönhagen, Schwobfeld, Sickerode, Steinbach, Steinheuterode, Tastungen, Teistungen, Thalwenden, Uder, Volkerode, Wahlhausen, Wehnde, Wiesenfeld, Wingerode, and Wüstheuterode.

== Members ==
The constituency has been held by the Christian Democratic Union since its creation in 1994. Its first representative was Dieter Althaus, who served from 1994 to 2014, followed by Gerold Wucherpfennig (2014–2019) and Thadäus König (2019–present).

Election	Member	Party	%
1994	Dieter Althaus	CDU	66.7
1999	Dieter Althaus	CDU	71.1
2004	Dieter Althaus	CDU	74.1
2009	Dieter Althaus	CDU	54.2
2014	Gerold Wucherpfennig	CDU	55.4
2019	Thadäus König	CDU	49.0
2024	Thadäus König	CDU	54.3

== Election results ==
=== 2024 election ===
State election (2024): Eichsfeld I
Notes:	Blue background denotes the winner of the electorate vote. Pink background denotes a candidate elected from their party list. Yellow background denotes an electorate win by a list member, or other incumbent. A ✓ or ✗ denotes status of any incumbent, win or lose respectively.						
Party	Candidate	Votes	%	±%	Party votes	%	±%
CDU	✓ Thadäus König	15,085	54.3	▲5.2	10,943	39.3	▼0.8
AfD	Stephanie Hüther-Keseling	8,282	29.8	▲8.4	8,209	29.5	▲7.5
BSW					2,944	10.6	
Left	Carolin Held	2,002	7.2	▼5.3	2,669	9.6	▼8.3
SPD	Maximilian Schröter	1,051	3.8	▼1.6	1,105	4.0	▼1.8
Greens					602	2.2	▼2.9
FW	Jörg Gottesleben	965	3.5	▲1.6	442	1.6	
FDP	Dario Uhde	382	1.4	▼2.3	278	1.0	▼3.5
APT					184	0.7	Steady
BD					115	0.4	
Values					92	0.3	
ÖDP					60	0.2	▼0.5
Pirates					43	0.2	Steady
MLPD					9	0.0	▼0.1
Informal votes		346			279		
Total valid votes		27,767			27,834		
Turnout		28,113	76.3	▲8.0			
CDU hold	Majority	6,803	24.5	▼3.1			

=== 2019 election ===
State election (2019): Eichsfeld I
Notes:	Blue background denotes the winner of the electorate vote. Pink background denotes a candidate elected from their party list. Yellow background denotes an electorate win by a list member, or other incumbent. A ✓ or ✗ denotes status of any incumbent, win or lose respectively.						
Party	Candidate	Votes	%	±%	Party votes	%	±%
CDU	Thadäus König	12,818	49.0	▼6.4	10,508	40.1	▼14.8
AfD	Björn Höcke	5,608	21.4	▲12.8	5,755	22.0	▲13.0
Left	Marit Wagler	3,278	12.5	0.0	4,695	17.9	▲4.0
Greens	Norbert Sondermann	1,581	6.0	▲0.9	1,328	5.1	▲0.8
SPD	Birgit Pelke	1,410	5.4	▼1.3	1,522	5.8	▼1.5
FDP	Ronald Krügel	971	3.7	▲0.3	1,181	4.5	▲2.3
Free Voters	Jörg Gottesleben	510	1.9	▼3.3			
List-only parties					1,224	4.7	
Informal votes		357			320		
Total valid votes		26,176			26,213		
Turnout		26,533	68.3	▲12.6			
CDU hold	Majority	7,210	27.6	▼15.3			

=== 2014 election ===
State election (2014): Eichsfeld I
Notes:	Blue background denotes the winner of the electorate vote. Pink background denotes a candidate elected from their party list. Yellow background denotes an electorate win by a list member, or other incumbent. A ✓ or ✗ denotes status of any incumbent, win or lose respectively.						
Party	Candidate	Votes	%	±%	Party votes	%	±%
CDU	Gerold Wucherpfennig	12,109	55.4	▲1.2	12,018	54.9	▲2.7
Left	Marit Wagler	2,725	12.5	▲0.3	3,051	13.9	▲0.3
AfD	Björn Höcke	1,882	8.6		1,960	9.0	
SPD	Birgit Pelke	1,471	6.7	▼4.6	1,595	7.3	▼3.4
Free Voters	Jörg Gottesleben	1,133	5.2	▼3.1	924	4.3	▼2.5
Greens	Norbert Sondermann	1,119	5.1	▲1.3	946	4.3	▲0.1
FDP	Matthias Bollwahn	746	3.4	▼3.4	474	2.2	▼5.6
NPD	Thorsten Heise	687	3.1	▼0.3	753	3.4	▼0.2
List-only parties					167	0.8	
Informal votes		249			233		
Total valid votes		21,872			21,888		
Turnout		22,121	55.7	▼9.9			
CDU hold	Majority	9,384	42.9	▲0.9			

=== 2009 election ===
State election (2009): Eichsfeld I
Notes:	Blue background denotes the winner of the electorate vote. Pink background denotes a candidate elected from their party list. Yellow background denotes an electorate win by a list member, or other incumbent. A ✓ or ✗ denotes status of any incumbent, win or lose respectively.						
Party	Candidate	Votes	%	±%	Party votes	%	±%
CDU	✓ Dieter Althaus	14,571	54.2	▼19.9	14,034	52.2	▼16.8
Left	Johanna Scheringer-Wright	3,291	12.2	▲0.9	3,665	13.6	▲2.2
SPD	Antje Ehrlich-Strathausen	3,036	11.3	▲2.1	2,873	10.7	▲1.8
Free Voters	Marco Josef Tasch	2,228	8.3		1,810	6.7	▲5.9
FDP	Matthias Bollwahn	1,831	6.8	▲4.1	2,098	7.8	▲5.0
Greens	Claudius Hille	1,009	3.8	▲1.1	1,136	4.2	▲1.4
NPD	Thorsten Heise	901	3.4		960	3.6	▲1.4
List-only parties					290	1.1	
Informal votes		431			432		
Total valid votes		26,867			26,866		
Turnout		27,298	65.6	▲2.3			
CDU hold	Majority	11,280	42.0	▼20.8			

=== 2004 election ===
State election (2004): Eichsfeld I
Notes:	Blue background denotes the winner of the electorate vote. Pink background denotes a candidate elected from their party list. Yellow background denotes an electorate win by a list member, or other incumbent. A ✓ or ✗ denotes status of any incumbent, win or lose respectively.						
Party	Candidate	Votes	%	±%	Party votes	%	±%
CDU	✓ Dieter Althaus	18,801	74.1	▲3.0	17,309	68.9	▼1.4
PDS	Werner Buse	2,877	11.3	▲0.6	2,888	11.5	▲1.0
SPD	Antje Ehrlich-Strathausen	2,331	9.2	▼3.9	2,244	8.9	▼3.9
Greens	Bernhard Winkelmann	699	2.8	▲1.2	717	2.9	▲1.4
FDP	Peter Zimmermann	668	2.6	▲0.4	702	2.8	▲1.6
List-only parties					1,255	5.0	
Informal votes		701			962		
Total valid votes		25,376			25,115		
Turnout		26,077	63.4	▼1.2			
CDU hold	Majority	16,204	62.8	▲4.8			

=== 1999 election ===
State election (1999): Eichsfeld I
Notes:	Blue background denotes the winner of the electorate vote. Pink background denotes a candidate elected from their party list. Yellow background denotes an electorate win by a list member, or other incumbent. A ✓ or ✗ denotes status of any incumbent, win or lose respectively.						
Party	Candidate	Votes	%	±%	Party votes	%	±%
CDU	✓ Dieter Althaus	17,978	71.1	▲4.4	17,796	70.3	▲5.9
SPD		3,326	13.1	▼5.5	3,236	12.8	▼6.8
PDS		2,698	10.7	▲2.3	2,659	10.5	▲2.5
FDP		557	2.2	0.0	298	1.2	▼1.2
Greens		392	1.5	▼2.6	385	1.5	▼1.6
REP		346	1.4		142	0.6	▼0.2
List-only parties					784	3.1	
Informal votes		304			301		
Total valid votes		25,297			25,300		
Turnout		25,601	64.6	▼19.0			
CDU hold	Majority	14,652	58.0	▲9.9			

=== 1994 election ===
State election (1994): Eichsfeld I
Notes:	Blue background denotes the winner of the electorate vote. Pink background denotes a candidate elected from their party list. Yellow background denotes an electorate win by a list member, or other incumbent. A ✓ or ✗ denotes status of any incumbent, win or lose respectively.						
Party	Candidate	Votes	%	±%	Party votes	%	±%
CDU	Dieter Althaus	20,564	66.7		19,928	64.4	
SPD		5,741	18.6		6,079	19.6	
PDS		2,586	8.4		2,475	8.0	
Greens		1,277	4.1		949	3.1	
FDP		682	2.2		729	2.4	
List-only parties					801	2.6	
Informal votes		720			609		
Total valid votes		30,850			30,961		
Turnout		31,570	83.6				
CDU win new seat	Majority	14,823	48.1				
