= Ramelow =

Ramelow is a surname. Notable people with the surname include:

- Bodo Ramelow (born 1956), German politician
- Carsten Ramelow (born 1974), German footballer

== See also ==
- Cabinet Ramelow, 8th Cabinet of the German federal state of Thuringia
