= GKS =

GKS may refer to:

- GK Software, a German enterprise software developer
- Gifted kid syndrome, a syndrome for gifted kids and former gifted kids
- Goskomstat, in the Soviet Union; now the Russian Federal State Statistics Service
- Gottfried Keller-Stiftung, a foundation and Cultural Heritage in Switzerland
- Graphical Kernel System, a computer graphics standard
- Stadion GKS, a multi-purpose stadium in Bełchatów, Poland
- Den gamle kongelige samling (The Old Royal Collection) in the Royal Library, Denmark
