= Christian Gottlob Steinmüller =

German organ builder (1792–1864)

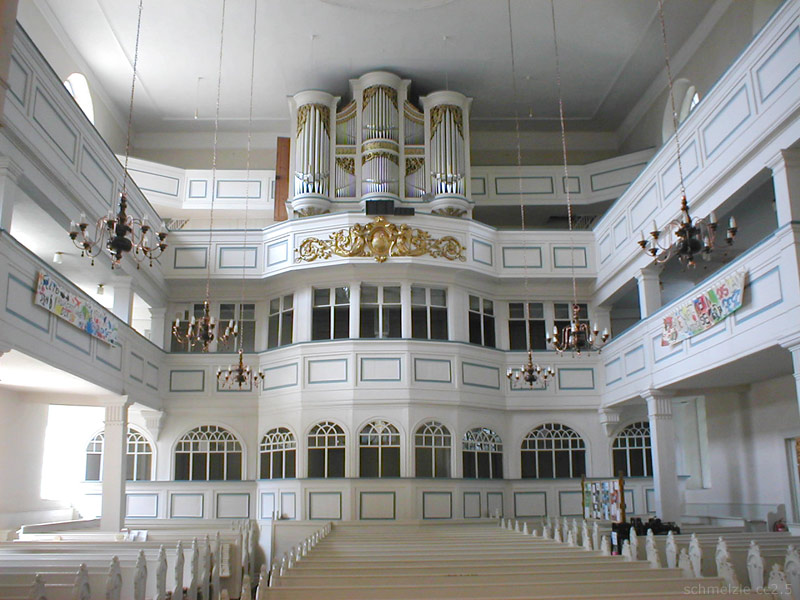
West end of the Church in Wolkenstein with the Steinmüller Organ of 1817/18

Christian Gottlob Steinmüller (25 September 1792 – 8 May 1864) was an organ builder in Germany.

== Life ==
He was born on 25 September 1792, the son of Johann Gottlob Steinmüller in Arnoldsgrün, in the Electorate of Saxony. On 15 January 1806, he began a 6-year apprenticeship with his uncle, Johann Gottlob Trampeli.

On completion of his apprenticeship he settled in Grünhainer Hospitalgasse and founded his own organ building business.

He married Wilhelmine Friedericke Hilliger.

== Work ==
According to his own records in his 52-year career he built at least 27 organs in the following locations.

- 1812: Grünhain
- 1813: Großzöbern
- 1817/1818: St.-Bartholomäus-Kirche (Wolkenstein)
- 1819/1820: Church in Gornsdorf
- 1820/1821: St. Johannis in Lößnitz (Erzgebirge)
- 1823: St.-Jakobi-Kirche in Oelsnitz/Erzgeb.
- 1824/1825: Church in Drebach
- 1827: Churches in Seifersbach und in Hormersdorf
- 1827/1828: Wehrgangkirche in Großrückerswalde
- 1828/1829: Church in Ursprung
- 1830: Church in Mildenau
- 1831: St. Michaeliskirche in Pausa/Vogtl.
- 1831: Church in Reinsberg
- 1832–1834: Church in Colmberg
- 1835/1836: Church in Arnoldsgrün
- 1837: Church in Schwarzbach (Elterlein)
- 1837/1838: St.-Laurentius-Kirche in Crimmitschau
- 1839: Church in Griesbach (Schneeberg)
- 1840/1841: Church in Thierfeld
- 1841/1842: St. Katharinen Church in Oelsnitz/Vogtl.
- 1842/1843: Church in Waldenburg (Sachsen)
- 1843: Church in Pfannenstiel
- 1844: St.-Jakobi-Kirche Mülsen
- 1845: Church in St. Egidien
- 1846/1847: Church in Auerbach (Erzgebirge)
- 1848: Allerheiligenkirche (Raschau)
