= Katja Mitteldorf =

German politician (born 1985)

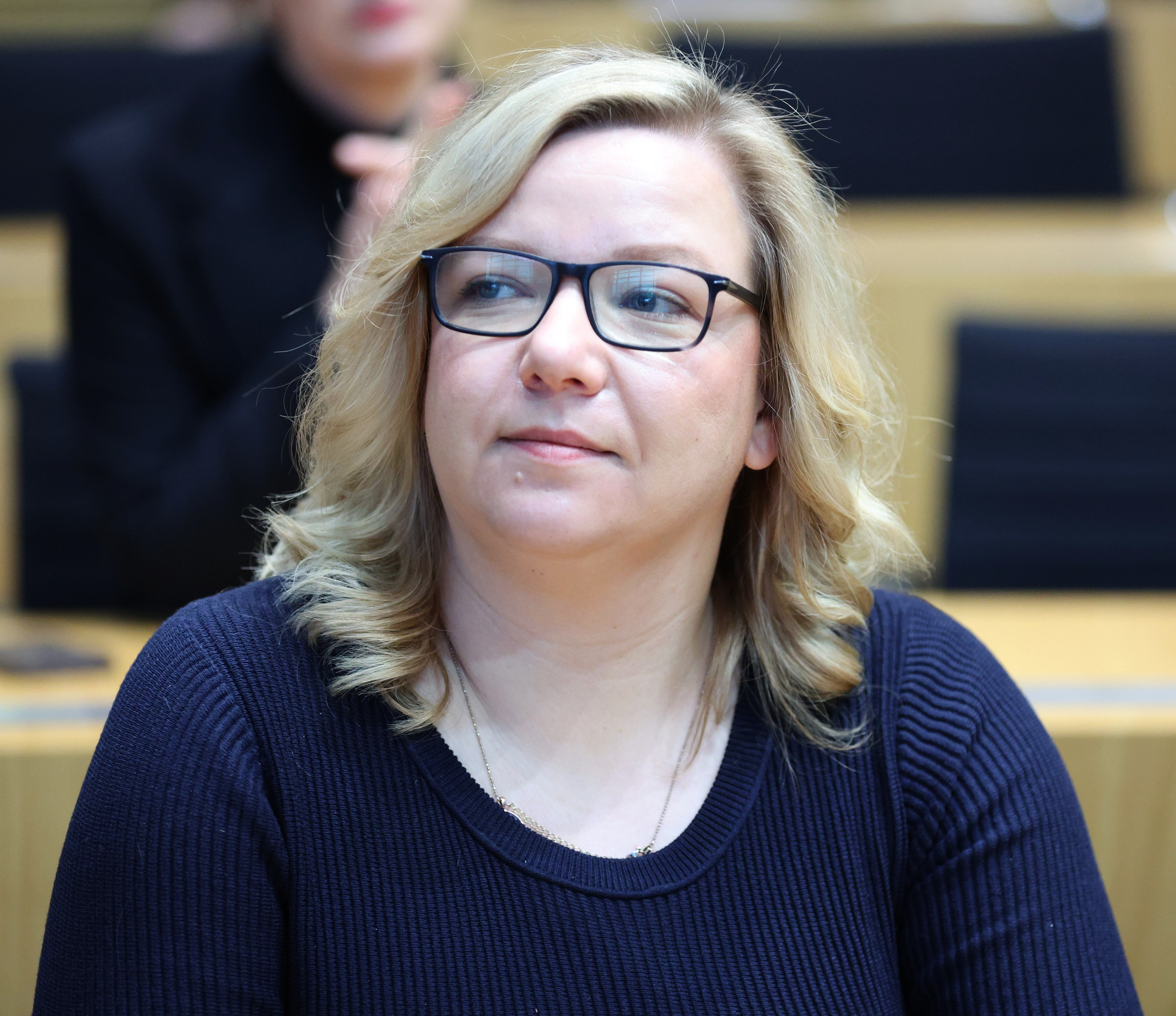
- Mitteldorf in 2024

Member of the Landtag of Thuringia
- Incumbent
- Assumed office 14 October 2014
- Preceded by: Klaus Zeh
- Constituency: Nordhausen II (2014–2024)

Personal details
- Born: 12 March 1985 (age 41)
- Party: Die Linke (since 2007)

Katja Mitteldorf (born 12 March 1985) is a German politician serving as a member of the Landtag of Thuringia since 2014. She has served as chief whip of Die Linke since 2024.
