= Nordhausen II =

Electoral constituency in Thuringia, Germany

Nordhausen II is an electoral constituency (German: Wahlkreis) represented in the Landtag of Thuringia. It elects one member via first-past-the-post voting. Under the current constituency numbering system, it is designated as constituency 4. It comprises the city of Nordhausen within the Nordhausen district.

Nordhausen II was created in 1990 for the first state election. Since 2024, it has been represented by Kerstin Düben-Schaumann of the AfD.

== Geography ==
As of the 2019 state election, Nordhausen II comprises the municipality of Nordhausen, excluding the village of Buchholz, which is part of Nordhausen I.

== Members ==
The constituency was held by the Christian Democratic Union (CDU) from its creation in 1990 until 2014, during which time it was represented by Egon Primas (1990–1994) and Klaus Zeh (1994–2014). It was won by The Left in 2014 and 2019, and then by the AfD in 2024.

Election	Member	Party	%
1990	Egon Primas	CDU	47.3
1994	Klaus Zeh	CDU	38.7
1999	Klaus Zeh	CDU	45.7
2004	Klaus Zeh	CDU	41.2
2009	Klaus Zeh	CDU	32.3
2014	Katja Mitteldorf	LINKE	32.9
2019	Katja Mitteldorf	LINKE	32.6
2024	Kerstin Düben-Schaumann	AfD	39.8

== Election results ==
=== 2024 election ===
State election (2024): Nordhausen II
Notes:	Blue background denotes the winner of the electorate vote. Pink background denotes a candidate elected from their party list. Yellow background denotes an electorate win by a list member, or other incumbent. A ✓ or ✗ denotes status of any incumbent, win or lose respectively.						
Party	Candidate	Votes	%	±%	Party votes	%	±%
AfD	Kerstin Düben-Schaumann	8,181	39.8	▲15.4	7,134	34.2	▲12.0
CDU	Markus Volkmann	5,796	28.2	▲5.8	4,630	22.2	▲3.8
BSW					3,550	17.0	
Left	✗ Katja Mitteldorf	3,840	18.7	▼13.9	2,905	13.9	▼21.7
SPD	Patrick Boersch	2,401	11.7	▲3.0	1,309	6.3	▼2.1
Greens					458	2.2	▼3.0
FDP	Franziska Baum	331	1.6	▼1.9	220	1.1	▼2.9
APT					214	1.0	▼0.1
FW					112	0.5	
BD					78	0.4	
Familie					89	0.4	
Pirates					52	0.2	▼0.1
Values					50	0.2	
MLPD					39	0.2	▼0.2
ÖDP					23	0.1	▼0.2
Informal votes		478			164		
Total valid votes		20,549			20,863		
Turnout		21,027	67.2	▲9.4			
AfD gain from Left	Majority	2,385	11.6				

=== 2019 election ===
State election (2019): Nordhausen II
Notes:	Blue background denotes the winner of the electorate vote. Pink background denotes a candidate elected from their party list. Yellow background denotes an electorate win by a list member, or other incumbent. A ✓ or ✗ denotes status of any incumbent, win or lose respectively.						
Party	Candidate	Votes	%	±%	Party votes	%	±%
Left	✓ Katja Mitteldorf	6,216	32.6	▼0.3	6,813	35.6	▲0.7
AfD	Leupold Andreas	4,650	24.4	▲16.3	4,244	22.2	▲13.7
CDU	Steffen Iffland	4,269	22.4	▼8.9	3,532	18.4	▼8.4
SPD	Anika Gruner	1,651	8.7	▼5.1	1,610	8.4	▼6.2
Greens	Sylvia Spehr	1,187	6.2	▲0.2	1,002	5.2	▼0.9
FDP	Carsten Dobras	668	3.5	▲1.6	760	4.0	▲1.4
Free Voters	Helmut Günther	348	1.8	▼1.1			
MLPD	Kurt Kleffel	94	0.5		69	0.4	
List-only parties					1,116	5.8	
Informal votes		267			204		
Total valid votes		19,083			19,146		
Turnout		19,350	57.8	▲12.2			
Left hold	Majority	1,566	8.2	▲6.6			

=== 2014 election ===
State election (2014): Nordhausen II
Notes:	Blue background denotes the winner of the electorate vote. Pink background denotes a candidate elected from their party list. Yellow background denotes an electorate win by a list member, or other incumbent. A ✓ or ✗ denotes status of any incumbent, win or lose respectively.						
Party	Candidate	Votes	%	±%	Party votes	%	±%
Left	Katja Mitteldorf	5,192	32.9	▲2.8	5,524	34.9	▲4.5
CDU	Inge Klaan	4,949	31.3	▼0.9	4,239	26.8	▼1.1
SPD	Andreas Wieninger	2,185	13.8	▼8.9	2,303	14.6	▼7.9
AfD	Alex Haake	1,285	8.1		1,338	8.5	
Greens	Rüdiger Neitzke	953	6.0	▲0.3	964	6.1	▼0.7
NPD	Ralf Friedrich	475	3.0	▼1.2	531	3.4	▼0.7
Free Voters	Uwe Chour	457	2.9		217	1.4	▲0.1
FDP	Manuel Thume	296	1.9	▼3.1	407	2.6	▼4.0
List-only parties					292	1.8	
Informal votes		194			171		
Total valid votes		15,792			15,815		
Turnout		15,986	45.6	▼6.9			
Left gain from CDU	Majority	243	1.6				

=== 2009 election ===
State election (2009): Nordhausen II
Notes:	Blue background denotes the winner of the electorate vote. Pink background denotes a candidate elected from their party list. Yellow background denotes an electorate win by a list member, or other incumbent. A ✓ or ✗ denotes status of any incumbent, win or lose respectively.						
Party	Candidate	Votes	%	±%	Party votes	%	±%
CDU	✓ Klaus Zeh	5,955	32.3	▼8.9	5,131	27.8	▼10.8
Left	Rainer Bachmann	5,555	30.1	▼1.8	5,616	30.4	▼0.8
SPD	Andreas Wieninger	4,196	22.8	▲5.5	4,159	22.5	▲6.1
Greens	Jörg Blobel	1,052	5.7	▼0.1	1,274	6.9	▲2.3
FDP	Rainer Rodekirchen	917	5.0	▲1.1	1,209	6.5	▲2.9
NPD	Ralf Friedrich	765	4.1		743	4.0	▲2.5
List-only parties					335	1.8	
Informal votes		312			285		
Total valid votes		18,440			18,467		
Turnout		18,752	52.3	▲6.3			
CDU hold	Majority	400	2.2	▼7.1			

=== 2004 election ===
State election (2004): Nordhausen II
Notes:	Blue background denotes the winner of the electorate vote. Pink background denotes a candidate elected from their party list. Yellow background denotes an electorate win by a list member, or other incumbent. A ✓ or ✗ denotes status of any incumbent, win or lose respectively.						
Party	Candidate	Votes	%	±%	Party votes	%	±%
CDU	✓ Klaus Zeh	6,615	41.2	▼4.5	6,182	38.6	▼7.2
PDS	Rainer Bachmann	5,124	31.9	▲7.0	4,993	31.2	▲6.4
SPD	Manfred Breitrück	2,784	17.3	▼6.9	2,630	16.4	▼6.0
Greens	Gisela Hartmann	925	5.8	▲3.2	736	4.6	▲2.7
FDP	Marcel Hardrath	620	3.9	▲2.9	569	3.6	▲2.9
List-only parties					890	5.6	
Informal votes		530			598		
Total valid votes		16,068			16,000		
Turnout		16,598	46.0	▼10.4			
CDU hold	Majority	1,491	9.3	▼11.5			

=== 1999 election ===
State election (1999): Nordhausen II
Notes:	Blue background denotes the winner of the electorate vote. Pink background denotes a candidate elected from their party list. Yellow background denotes an electorate win by a list member, or other incumbent. A ✓ or ✗ denotes status of any incumbent, win or lose respectively.						
Party	Candidate	Votes	%	±%	Party votes	%	±%
CDU	✓ Klaus Zeh	9,390	45.7	▲7.0	9,430	45.8	▲8.3
PDS	Klaus Gorges	5,121	24.9	▲0.8	5,107	24.8	▲3.9
SPD	Richard Dewes	4,969	24.2	▼5.2	4,619	22.4	▼9.9
Greens		539	2.6	▼3.2	384	1.9	▼1.9
REP	Elke Wittger	347	1.7		106	0.5	▼0.7
FDP	Margret Duensing	197	1.0	▼1.1	149	0.7	▼1.3
List-only parties					789	3.8	
Informal votes		267			246		
Total valid votes		20,563			20,584		
Turnout		20,830	56.3	▼16.2			
CDU hold	Majority	4,269	20.8	▲11.5			

=== 1994 election ===
State election (1994): Nordhausen II
Notes:	Blue background denotes the winner of the electorate vote. Pink background denotes a candidate elected from their party list. Yellow background denotes an electorate win by a list member, or other incumbent. A ✓ or ✗ denotes status of any incumbent, win or lose respectively.						
Party	Candidate	Votes	%	±%	Party votes	%	±%
CDU	Klaus Zeh	10,616	38.7	▼8.6	10,331	37.5	▼9.4
SPD		8,091	29.5	▲5.2	8,956	32.5	▲4.1
PDS		6,557	23.9	▲17.2	5,739	20.8	▲13.8
Greens		1,577	5.8	▲1.2	1,066	3.9	▼0.5
FDP		562	2.1	▼5.9	558	2.0	▼7.3
List-only parties					935	3.4	
Informal votes		716			534		
Total valid votes		27,403			27,585		
Turnout		28,119	72.6	▼1.2			
CDU hold	Majority	2,525	9.2	▼13.8			

=== 1990 election ===
State election (1990): Nordhausen II
Notes:	Blue background denotes the winner of the electorate vote. Pink background denotes a candidate elected from their party list. Yellow background denotes an electorate win by a list member, or other incumbent. A ✓ or ✗ denotes status of any incumbent, win or lose respectively.						
Party	Candidate	Votes	%	±%	Party votes	%	±%
CDU	Egon Primas	13,811	47.3		13,766	46.9	
SPD		7,102	24.3		8,339	28.4	
FDP		2,325	8.0		2,731	9.3	
PDS		1,949	6.7		2,061	7.0	
Greens		1,338	4.6		1,287	4.4	
Independent		1,183	4.1				
DFD		981	3.4		389	1.3	
DSU		370	1.3		270	0.9	
UFV		139	0.5		125	0.4	
List-only parties					373	1.3	
Informal votes		1,277			1,134		
Total valid votes		29,198			29,341		
Turnout		30,475	73.8				
CDU win new seat	Majority	6,709	23.0				
