= Birgit Klaubert =

German politician

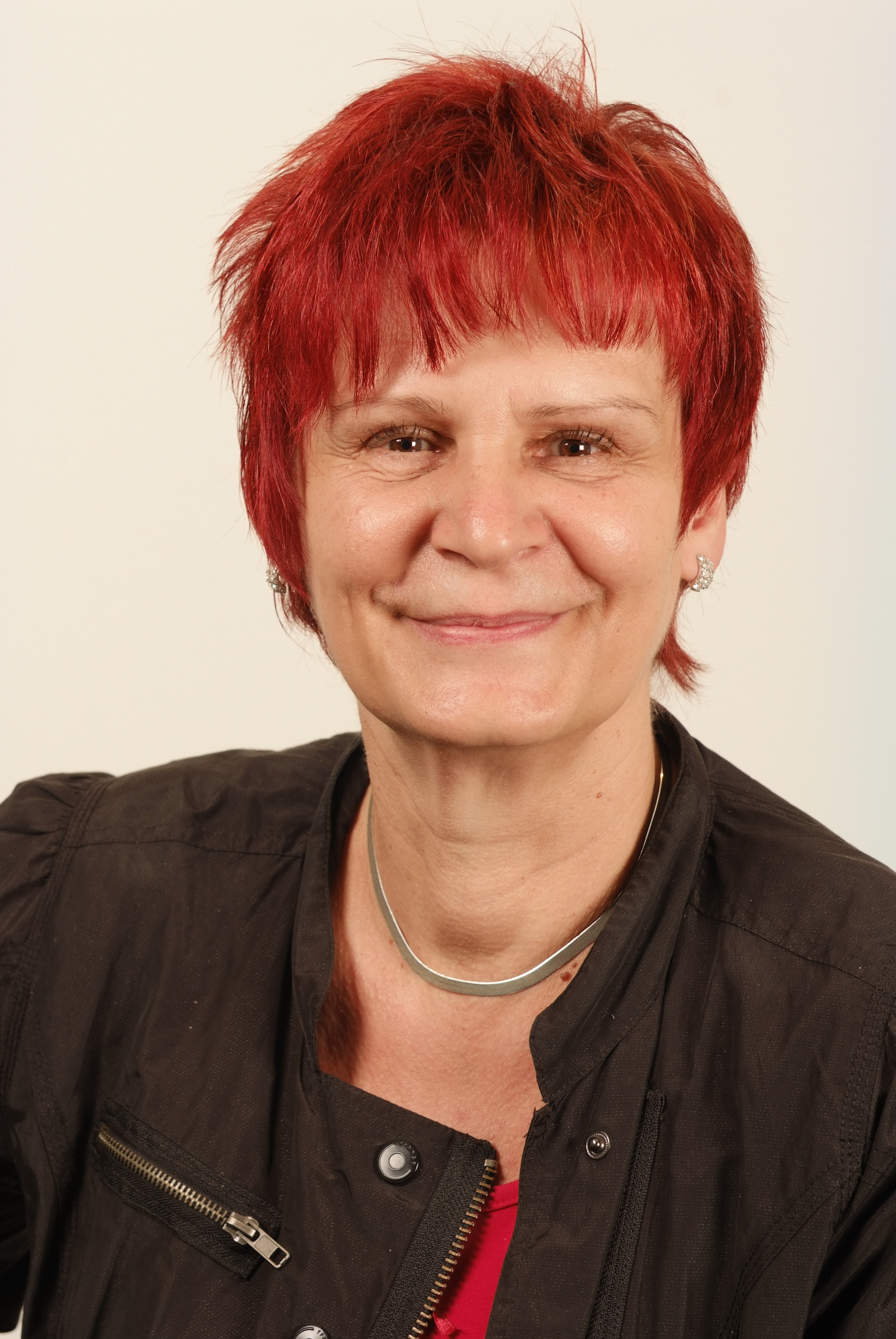

Former vice president of the Thuringian regional parliament
- In office 2014–2017

Served as Thuringia's Minister for Education, Youth and Sport

Personal details
- Born: 28 September 1954 (age 72) Schöneck, East Germany
- Education: Karl Marx University of Leipzig
- Occupation: Politician

Birgit Klaubert (born 28 September 1954) is a German politician (Die Linke) and former vice president of the Thuringian regional parliament ("Landtag"). From 2014 to 2017 Klaubert served as Thuringia's Minister for Education, Youth and Sport.

== Life ==
=== Provenance and early years ===
Klaubert was born in Schöneck, a small town in the mountains to the east of Plauen in East Germany, and close to the country's frontier with the westernmost extent of Czechoslovakia. She attended school locally in Klingenthal, where passing her school final exams ("Abitur") opened the way to university level education. Between 1973 and 1977 she studied and qualified for a degree as a teacher of History and German at the Karl Marx University of Leipzig (as it was known at that time). Between 1977 and 1980 she worked as a teacher at the secondary school ("Polytechnische Oberschule") in Altenburg. After that, till 1983, she worked at Altenburg's teacher training institute.

Between 1983 and 1986 she undertook a further period of study as an "Aspirantur" in the history department at the "Clara Zetkin" teacher training college in Leipzig. This led to a doctorate. Her dissertation was entitled "The struggle of Germany's free trades unions to organise women workers between 1896 and the outbreak of the First World War" ("Das Ringen der freien Gewerkschaften Deutschlands um die Organisierung der Arbeiterinnen von 1896 bis zum Ausbruch des 1. Weltkrieges"). After this she returned to teaching work at the teacher training institute in Altenburg, where she remained till 1994 when her political involvement translated into a full-time job and a seat in the Thuringian regional parliament ("Landtag").

=== Politics ===
While growing Klaubert was, like almost all her contemporaries a member of the country's youth organisations, the Free German Youth ("Freie Deutsche Jugend" / FDJ) and the Pioneers. She was a candidate for membership of East Germany's ruling Socialist Unity Party ("Sozialistische Einheitspartei Deutschlands" / SED) and the next year, which was the year of her twentieth birthday, she was accepted as a party member. Most sources are silent on her political involvement before 1989: a biographical note provided by the party of which she is now a member indicates that her political involvement included conducting classes and seminars for groups of children and trades unionists. The same source spells out that she never collaborated with the infamous Ministry for State Security ("Stasi").

Following reunification Klaubert became more politically involved. The old SED which had ruled in East Germany relaunched itself as the Party of Democratic Socialism (PDS), and set about adapting itself for a democratic future. Following further political realignments the party merged into a new party, called simply Die Linke in 2007. Throughout this period, initially at a municipal level and later on the regional stage, she remained active as a member of the party through its ups and downs. She was elected to the Altenburg town council in 1990.

In 1994 she was elected to the Thuringian regional parliament ("Landtag"). Between 13 December 1995 and 12 September 1999, in succession to Ursula Fischer, she led the PDS group in the chamber. The focus of her own interests in the chamber was on "culture", as broadly defined. She was deeply interested in education and training matters. In 1999 she was elected one of the two vice-presidents of the Thuringian Landtag, regularly re-elected to the post till 2014.

In 2013 the regional party executive proposed Klaubert as the party's lead candidate for Thuringia in the forthcoming general election. The nomination was supported by the local party committees, and on 2 March 2013 at meeting held at Friedrichroda party delegates voted on the matter. However, when the votes were counted Klaubert was found to have received only 59 of the 120 delegates' votes. Faced with this underwhelming endorsement she withdrew her candidacy. Commentators speculated that the unexpected outcome of the vote reflected general disenchantment with the local party executive rather than hitherto unidentified issues over Klaubert's own candidacy. After being appointed regional Thuringia's Minister for Education, Youth and Sport in the Ramelow Cabinet she took the opportunity - like Bodo Ramelow himself - to resign her seat in the Landtag.

Klaubert announced her resignation due to illness on 4 July 2017. She was succeeded by Helmut Holter in August 2017.

== Beyond politics ==
Klaubert is a member of the Board of Trustees of the Regional Centre for Political Education and a member of the REgional Memorials Council. She is also an honorary (unpaid) member of the Supervisory Board of the Theater Altenburg Gera.
