= Heike Werner =

German politician (born 1969)

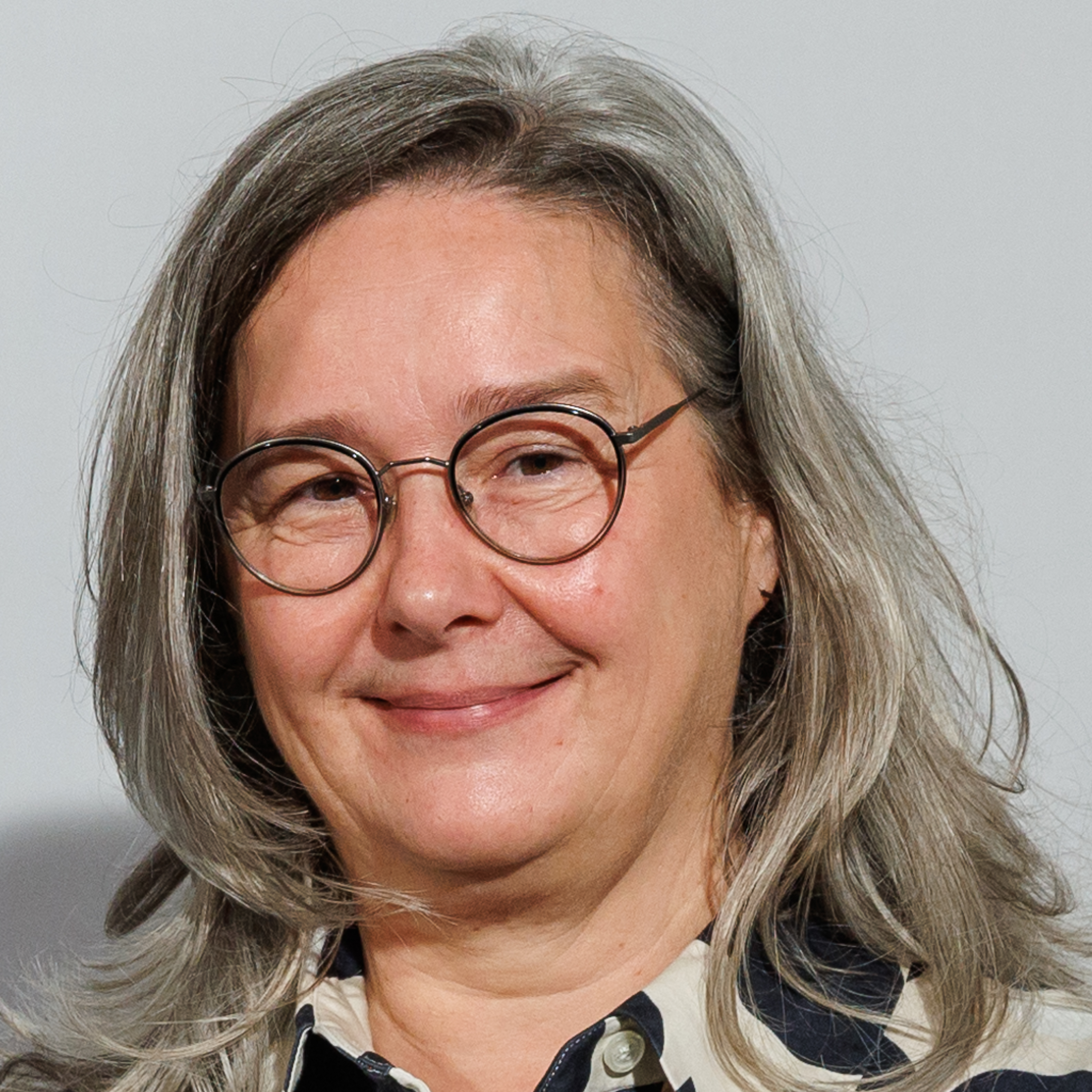
- Werner in 2024

Member of the Landtag of the Free State of Saxony
- In office 1999–2014

Personal details
- Born: 30 January 1969 (age 57) Berlin, Germany
- Party: Die Linke

Heike Werner (born 30 January 1969 in Berlin) is a German politician of the Left Party who has been Minister of Labor, Social Affairs, Health, Women, and Family on Thuringia's Left-led cabinet since the 2014 state election. From 1999 to 2014, she was a member of the Landtag of the Free State of Saxony.

Werner became active in politics during communist rule in East Germany. She was active in the Free German Youth and joined the Socialist Unity Party of Germany at the age of 18 in 1987. She left the party in 1990 but remained active in left-wing politics.
