= Birgit Pommer =

German politician

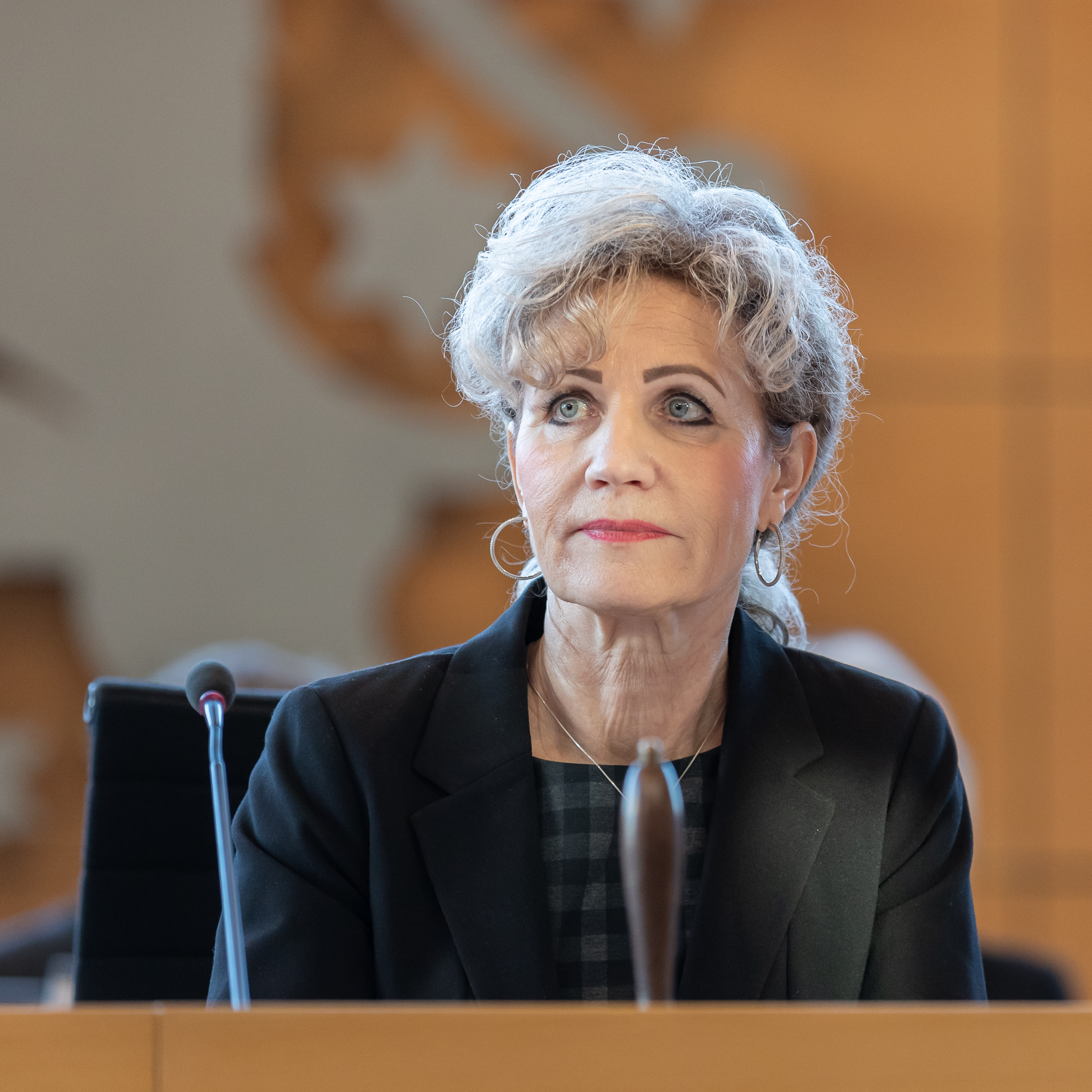
- Pommer in 2020

President of the Landtag of Thuringia
- In office 26 November 2019 – 26 September 2024
- Preceded by: Birgit Diezel
- Succeeded by: Thadäus König

Minister for Infrastructure and Agriculture of Thuringia
- In office 5 December 2014 – 26 November 2019
- Preceded by: Jürgen Reinholz
- Succeeded by: Benjamin-Immanuel Hoff

Administrator of Nordhausen District
- In office 6 May 2012 – 5 December 2014
- Preceded by: Joachim Claus
- Succeeded by: Jutta Krauth

Member of the Landtag of Thuringia
- Incumbent
- Assumed office 27 October 2019
- Preceded by: Egon Primas
- Constituency: Nordhausen I
- Majority: 7,009 (32.3%)
- In office 30 August 2009 – 6 May 2012
- Constituency: List

Personal details
- Born: Birgit Ehrhardt; 28 January 1959 (age 67) Eisleben, East Germany
- Party: The Left (2007–present); PDS (1990–2007); SED (1977–1990)
- Children: 2

Birgit Pommer (née Ehrhardt, previously Keller, born 28 January 1959) is a German politician of The Left who has served as President of the Landtag of Thuringia from 2019 to 2024. She is the first member of her party to serve as speaker of any state parliament. Prior, she served as Minister for Infrastructure and Agriculture in the first Ramelow cabinet.

== Personal life ==
Pommer's father was an economist and her mother a teacher. Both were members of the National Democratic Party in East Germany. She graduated from polytechnic high school in 1975, but was unable to take her Abitur since she came from an "intelligentsia" family. After vocational training as an electrician, she worked as a research assistant in the field of heavy current plant engineering from 1977 to 1982. From 1983 to 1988, she completed a correspondence course of study and graduated with a degree in social science. From 1989 to 1991, Pommer worked as a kindergarten teacher. Between 1995 and 2004, she was a staff member in a constituency office. Pommer adopted her surname upon marrying Reiner Pommer in 2022. Previously, she was known as Birgit Keller. She has two children as well as three grandchildren from her previous marriage.

== Political career ==
Pommer joined the Socialist Unity Party of Germany (SED), the ruling party of East Germany, in 1977. She was a staffer for the Free German Youth district leadership from 1983 to 1988, then a staffer of the SED district leadership from 1988 to 1989. In 1989, Pommer sat at the East German Round Table as a representative of the SED. After German reunification, she remained a member of the Party of Democratic Socialism (PDS). From 1990 to 1992, she was a member of the presidium of the party's Thuringia branch; she also stood for election as state chairwoman, but lost to Gabi Zimmer.

Since 1994, Pommer has been a member of the Nordhausen district council. She served as council president from 1996 to 2006, after which time she became chairwoman of her party's faction. She is a member of the Committee for Environment, Agriculture and Forestry. In the 2009 municipal election, she was elected to the Nordhausen City Council.

Pommer ran unsuccessfully in the 1999 and 2004 state elections. She was elected in the 2009 election in seventh place on The Left party list. In the Landtag, she served as budget policy spokeswoman for her parliamentary group.

Pommer was elected district administrator of the Nordhausen district in 2012, defeating CDU candidate Egon Primas. She subsequently resigned from the Landtag, and did not run for re-election in 2014.

On 5 December 2014, Pommer was appointed Minister for Infrastructure and Agriculture in the first cabinet of Minister-President Bodo Ramelow. She ran for election to the Landtag again in 2019, and was elected as representative for the Nordhausen I constituency, winning 32.3% of votes. She resigned from cabinet after being elected President of the Landtag on 26 November, becoming the first member of her party to hold this office in any state parliament. She won 52 votes to 28 against, with 10 abstentions.
