= Maximilian Schröter =

German politician (born 1994)

Member of the Landtag of Thuringia
- Incumbent
- Assumed office 1 September 2026
- Preceded by: Cornelia Urban

Personal details
- Born: 14 February 1994 (age 32)
- Party: Social Democratic Party (since 2011)

Dirk Maximilian Schröter (born 14 February 1994) is a German politician serving as a member of the Landtag of Thuringia since 2026. From 2021 to 2023, he served as chairman of Jusos in Thuringia.
