= Coalition committee =

A coalition committee (German: Koalitionsausschuss, also called the steering committee) is an informal body composed of leading figures from the coalition parties and the government. Coalition committees, in contrast to parliamentary committees, have no formal authority granted to them by constitution or legislation. Coalition committees are common in Western European countries; in Germany, they have existed with interruptions since the Kressbronn Circle of the first Grand Coalition (1966–1969). Coalition committees are also sometimes found in Germany at the level of the federal states. A coalition committee coordinates cooperation between coalition partners. The committee operation is frequently defined in the coalition agreement: for example, committee meetings can be scheduled either regularly or only in the event of particular differences between the actors involved. In practice, ad hoc committee meetings have also occurred. Members of coalition committees are usually representatives of the government, the parliamentary groups, and the parties supporting the government.

Agreements reached in the coalition committee are introduced into formal bodies with the help of the committee members.

== History in Germany ==
Annual meetings of the coalition committee according to various sources (1966–2005).

The establishment of a coalition committee as a steering body at the federal level was first envisaged after the successful government formation negotiations between the CDU/CSU and FDP in 1961 and was laid down in writing in a coalition agreement. The Kressbronn Circle was the committee for the first Grand Coalition under Kurt Georg Kiesinger. During the governments of Willy Brandt and Helmut Schmidt, a coalition committee also met regularly, albeit often under different names, such as Koalitionsrunde (coalition circle). The coalition committee also existed under Helmut Kohl. In Gerhard Schröder's red-green coalition, the coalition committee met much more irregularly than before and did not meet for months at a time. In Angela Merkel's governments, this arena was used regularly again. In the early years of the Federal Republic, in the Adenauer era, the coalition committee also existed, but it had different composition, with members being representatives of the parliamentary groups. There were also so-called 'coalition talks' between the Chancellor, the cabinet, and the coalition parliamentary groups – i.e., without the party leaders.

A systematic overview of coalition committee meetings is hardly possible due to their informal nature. It can be approximated from media reports and, after declassification, from records in archives like the Archive of Social Democracy.

== Functioning and impact ==
Compared to the cabinet of ministers, the coalition committee is better suited as a conflict resolution body because the small group of participants is tightly-knit and maintains confidentiality. The committee can prevent conflict-laden decisions from being discussed at the cabinet level. An average duration of the German coalition committee meeting between 1967 and 1982 was about two and a half hours. Difficult deliberations, e.g., the preliminary discussions of budget drafts, can last significantly longer.

Laws that were discussed in the coalition committee before being introduced to the Bundestag pass through the legislative process faster than those bypassing this initial step. This indicates that individual conflicts can indeed be defused in the coalition committee.

In a comparison of Western European countries, coalition committees seem to reduce the likelihood of a government breaking up before the end of its term. However, a coalition committee cannot prevent a breakup, for example, if (economic) crises complicate cooperation within a coalition or if the 'stock of common ground' is exhausted.

== Criticism and assessment ==
In Germany, the coalition committee has been subject to criticism since its inception, although the number of opposing voices has declined over time. Thus, an "exodus from the institutions" is diagnosed, and similar criticism is found in Austria and Italy.

Since coalition committees de facto control the work of the government and the parliamentary majority, without being directly accountable to the Bundestag, the decisions made by coalition committees are viewed critically from a democratic theory perspective. They are accused of governing "past the parliament" and "in the back room". It is argued that it is not clearly comprehensible to voters who participates in the decisions, as the members of the coalition committee as such have no legitimacy. Moreover, "the opportunities for participation of the individual officeholder within the governing majority are narrowed to such an extent that it makes it difficult for them to exercise their responsibility". Coalition committees "have meanwhile developed into an informal decision-making body with comprehensive competencies" and therefore function as a kind of unofficial government branch not mentioned in the constitution.

Participants sometimes more than one point of view on the coalition committee. For example, Helmut Schmidt saw the coalition committee as an opportunity to communicate the parliamentary group's position before the government's formal decision-making processes. Other statements confirm that the normative criticism is indeed justified. For example, Helmut Schmidt stated regarding a change in the circle of participants: "In any case, this would then visibly shift some decisions to the parliament. This would have disadvantages for the functioning of the coalition, but advantages for the reputation of the parliament."

== See also ==
- Coalition committee in the 19th electoral term
- Coalition committee in the 18th electoral term
- Coalition committee in the 16th electoral term
- Coalition agreement
- Conference of Minister-Presidents

== Sources ==
- Miller, Bernhard (2011). Der Koalitionsausschuss: Existenz, Einsatz und Effekte einer informellen Arena des Koalitionsmanagements. Studien zum Parlamentarismus (in German). Baden-Baden: Nomos. ISBN 978-3-8329-6138-1.
