= Carolin Gerbothe =

German politician (born 1991)

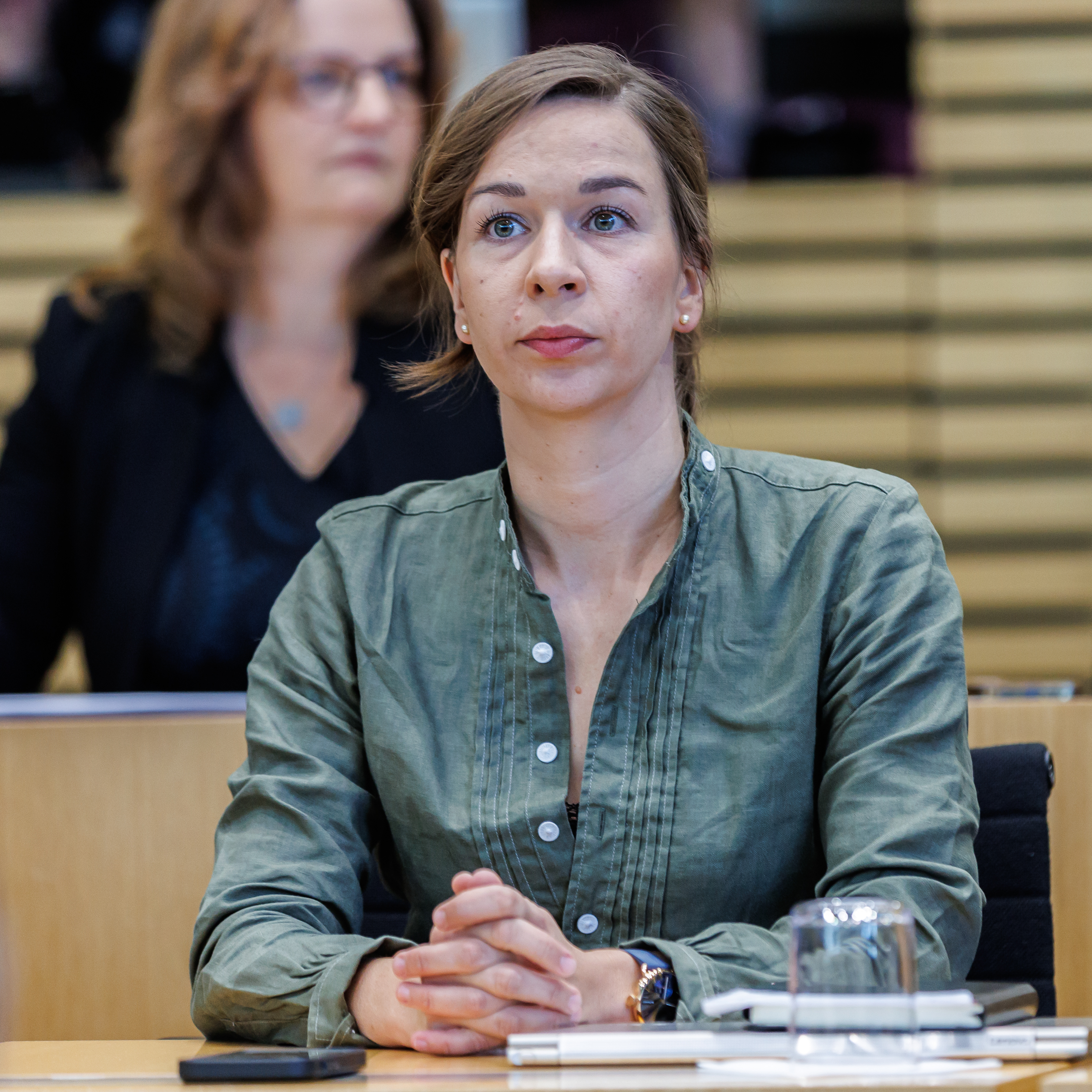
- Gerbothe in 2024

Member of the Landtag of Thuringia
- Incumbent
- Assumed office 26 September 2024

Personal details
- Born: 14 November 1991 (age 34)
- Party: Christian Democratic Union (since 2014)

Carolin Gerbothe (born 14 November 1991) is a German politician serving as a member of the Landtag of Thuringia since 2024. From 2019 to 2021, she was the head of agriculture and forestry policy of the Christian Democratic Union of Thuringia.
