= Franka Hitzing =

German politician

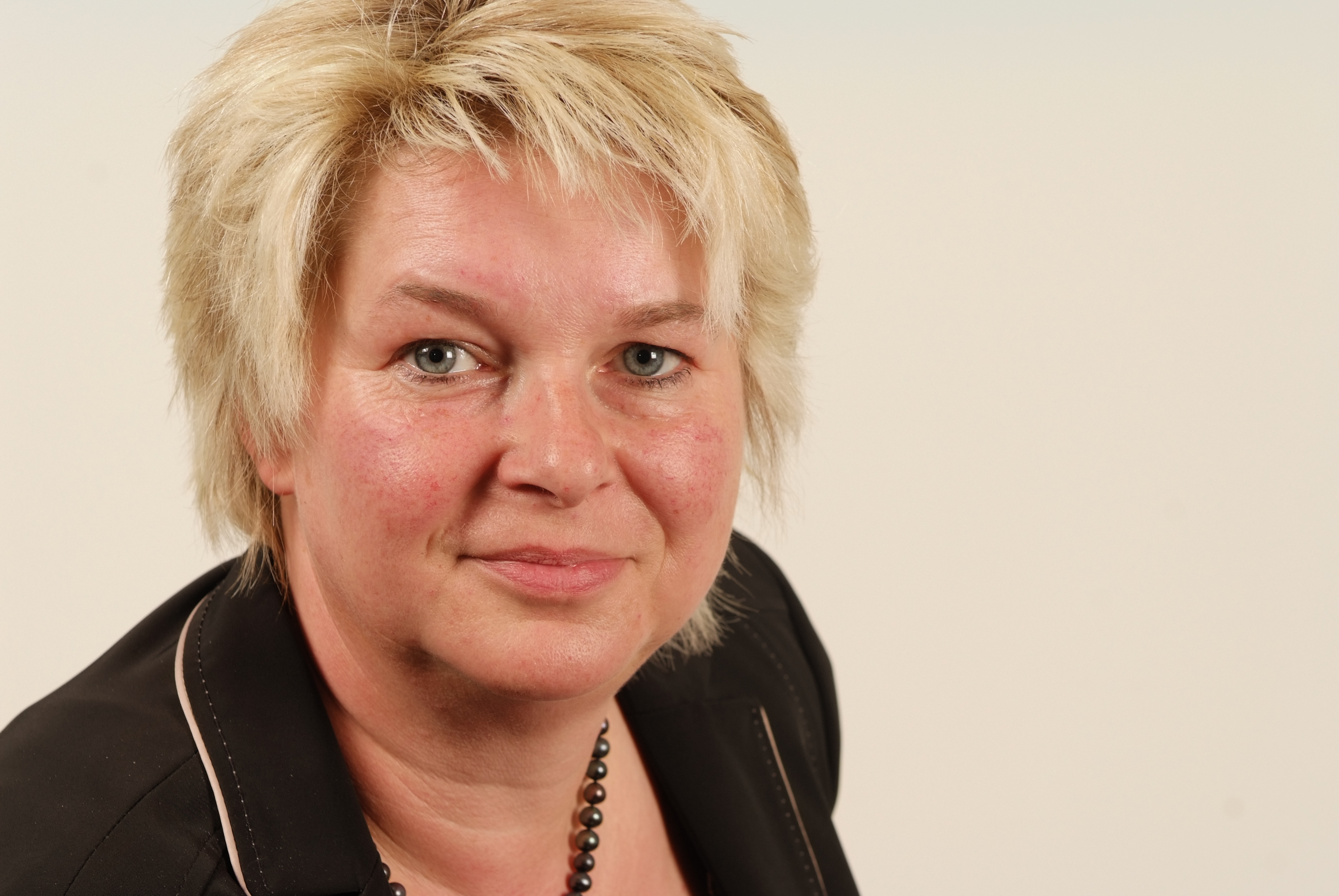
- Franka Hitzing in 2011

Personal details
- Born: January 25, 1966 (age 60) Nordhausen
- Party: FDP
- Education: Ernst Moritz Arndt University Greifswald; Martin Luther University Halle-Wittenberg
- Occupation: Politician, educator

Franka Hitzing (born January 25, 1966, in Nordhausen) is a German politician (FDP). She was a member of the Thuringian State Parliament from 2009 to 2014 and served as the state chairwoman of the FDP Thuringia from 2014 to 2015.

== Career ==
After graduating in 1984, Hitzing began a teacher training program in Mathematics and Geography at the Ernst Moritz Arndt University in Greifswald, which she continued in 1985 at the Martin Luther University Halle-Wittenberg. In 1989, she completed her studies and became a certified teacher. Since then, she has been working as a teacher at the current regular school in Wolkramshausen.

In 2005, Hitzing was elected to the state executive board of the FDP Thuringia. She is the faction leader of the FDP district council group in the Nordhausen district and has been serving as the honorary mayor of Friedrichsthal since 2006. In the 2018 election, she was reconfirmed in office with 99.1 percent of the vote.

She was elected to the 5th Thuringian State Parliament in the 2009 state election through the FDP state list, holding the second position. In the inaugural session of the legislative period, on September 29, 2009, she was elected as the Vice President of the Thuringian State Parliament.

In the 2014 state election, when the FDP once again failed to secure seats in the state parliament, Hitzing, who had run again as the second candidate on the FDP state list, lost her mandate. Following the resignation of the longtime state chairman, Uwe Barth, she was elected as the new Thuringian FDP state chairwoman on November 22, 2014, winning with 72 to 63 votes (with two abstentions) against Thomas L. Kemmerich.

In January 2015, Hitzing was unanimously nominated as the candidate for the district council election in the Nordhausen district held on April 26, 2015, where she obtained 17.4 percent of the vote.

On September 17, 2015, Hitzing resigned as state chairwoman citing personal reasons. Initially, Dirk Bergner served as the interim successor, and in November 2015, Thomas L. Kemmerich was elected as the new state chairman at a special party congress.
