= First Ramelow cabinet =

State government of Thuringia

First Cabinet of Bodo Ramelow Cabinet Ramelow I
- 8th Cabinet of Thuringia
- 2014–2020
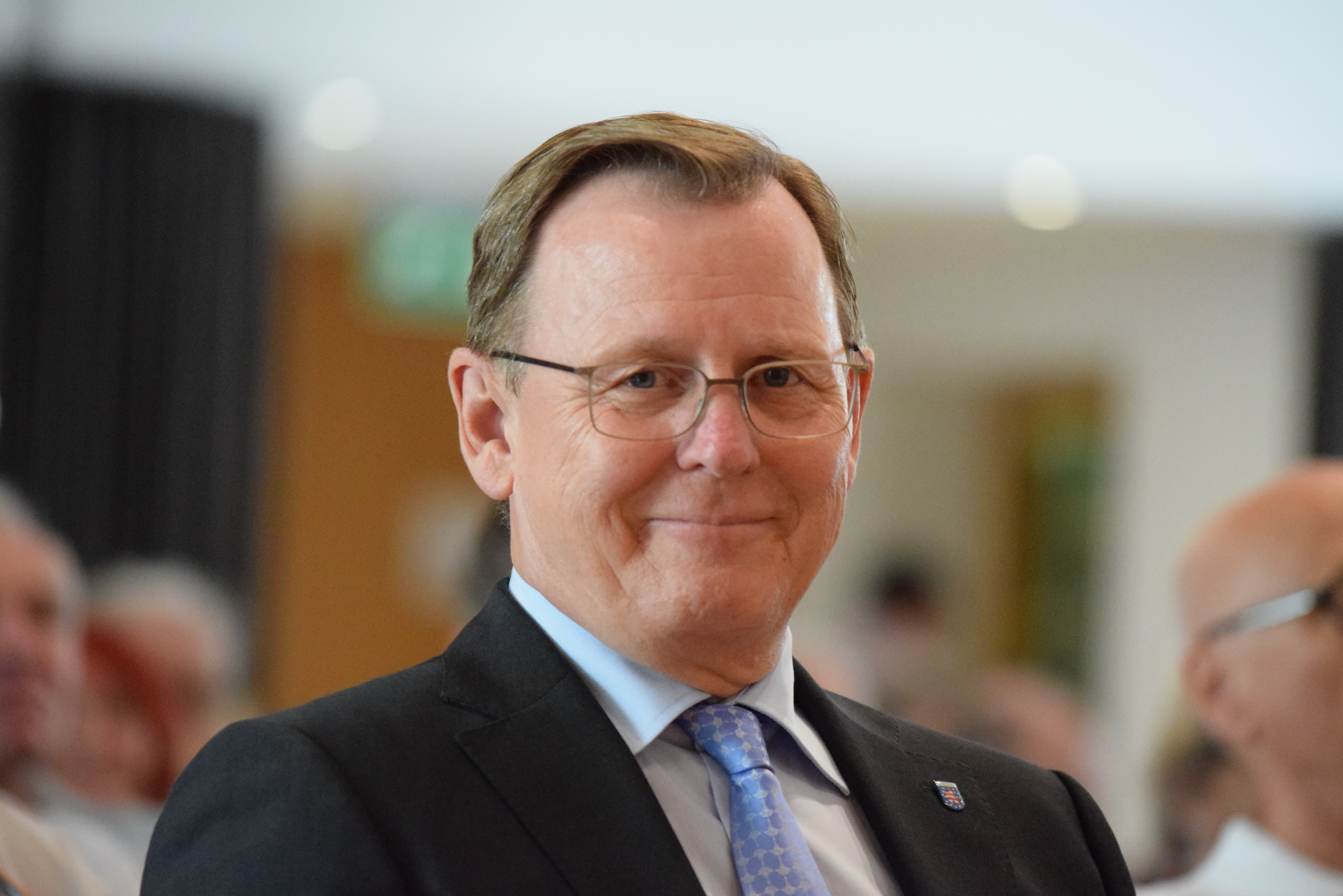
- Bodo Ramelow in June 2016
- Date formed: 5 December 2014
- Date dissolved: 5 February 2020

People and organisations
- Minister-President: Bodo Ramelow
- Deputy Minister-President: Heike Taubert; Anja Siegesmund
- No. of ministers: 9
- Member parties: The Left; Social Democratic Party; Alliance 90/The Greens
- Status in legislature: Coalition government
- Opposition parties: Christian Democratic Union; Alternative for Germany

History
- Election: 2014 Thuringian state election
- Legislature term: 6th Landtag of Thuringia
- Predecessor: Lieberknecht
- Successor: Kemmerich (Note: Thomas Kemmerich did not appoint any ministers during his short time in office and the ministries were led by the state secretaries of the previous government; his government was a one-person cabinet.)

The first Ramelow cabinet was the state government of Thuringia between 2014 and 2020, sworn in on 5 December 2014 after Bodo Ramelow was elected as Minister-President by the members of the Landtag of Thuringia. It was the 7th Cabinet of Thuringia.

It was formed after the 2014 Thuringian state election by The Left (LINKE), the Social Democratic Party (SPD), and Alliance 90/The Greens (GRÜNE). Excluding the Minister-President, the cabinet comprised nine ministers. Four were members of The Left, three were members of the SPD, and two were members of the Greens.

The first Ramelow cabinet left office on 5 February 2020 after Thomas Kemmerich was elected Minister-President.

== Formation ==
The previous cabinet was a coalition government CDU and SPD led by Minister-President Christine Lieberknecht.

The state election took place on 14 September, and resulted in small gains for the CDU and a substantial decline for the SPD. The Left and Greens remained steady on 28% and 6% respectively, while the AfD debuted at 11%. Overall, the incumbent coalition retained a slim majority of one seat.

The SPD's losses prompted the party to consider changing course and defecting from the outgoing government. A left-wing coalition of The Left, SPD, and Greens also held a one-seat majority. After holding exploratory talks with the other parties, they SPD carried out a postal ballot of their membership to gauge support for a coalition with The Left and Greens. The results were announced on 4 November, with 69.9% voting in favour. Turnout among the party's 4,300 members was 77.5%. The three parties thus entered into negotiations. They presented their coalition agreement on 19 November.

Bodo Ramelow was elected Minister-President by the Landtag on 6 December after two rounds of voting. In the first ballot, he received 45 votes in favour to 44 against, one short of the required majority. In the second ballot, he was elected with 46 votes in favour to 43 against. In both rounds, there was one abstention and one invalid vote.

Minister-President election
| Ballot → | 4 March 2020 | |
| Required majority → | 46 out of 91 | 46 out of 91 |
| Bodo Ramelow | 45 / 91 | 46 / 91 |
| Against | 44 / 91 | 43 / 91 |
| Abstentions | 1 / 91 | 1 / 91 |

== Composition ==
The composition of the cabinet at the time of its dissolution was as follows:

| Portfolio | Senator | Party | Took office | Left office | State secretaries |
|---|---|---|---|---|---|
| Minister-President | Bodo Ramelow born 19 February 1956 | LINKE | 5 December 2014 | 5 February 2020 | |
| First Deputy Minister-President Minister for Finance | Heike Taubert born 14 November 1958 | SPD | 5 December 2014 | 5 February 2020 | Hartmut Schubert |
| Second Deputy Minister-President Minister for Environment, Energy, and Nature Protection | Anja Siegesmund born 16 January 1977 | GRÜNE | 5 December 2014 | 5 February 2020 | Olaf Möller |
| Minister for Culture, Federal and European Affairs and Chief of the State Chancellery | Benjamin-Immanuel Hoff born 17 February 1976 | LINKE | 5 December 2014 | 5 February 2020 | Malte Krückels (Media, Representative to the Federal Government); Babette Winter (Culture and Europe) |
| Minister for Infrastructure and Agriculture (acting) | Benjamin-Immanuel Hoff born 17 February 1976 | LINKE | 26 November 2019 | 5 February 2020 | Klaus Sühl |
| Minister for Interior and Communities | Holger Poppenhäger born 3 April 1957 | SPD | 5 December 2014 | 30 August 2017 | Udo Götze |
| Minister for Interior and Communities | Georg Maier born 25 April 1967 | SPD | 30 August 2017 | 5 February 2020 | Udo Götze; Uwe Höhn |
| Minister for Education, Youth and Sport | Birgit Klaubert born 28 September 1954 | LINKE | 5 December 2014 | 17 August 2017 | Gabi Ohler |
| Minister for Education, Youth and Sport | Helmut Holter born 22 May 1953 | LINKE | 17 August 2017 | 5 February 2020 | Gabi Ohler |
| Minister for Migration, Justice and Consumer Protection | Dieter Lauinger born 5 December 1962 | GRÜNE | 5 December 2014 | 5 February 2020 | Sebastian von Ammon |
| Minister for Economics, Science and Digital Society | Wolfgang Tiefensee born 4 January 1955 | SPD | 5 December 2014 | 5 February 2020 | Markus Hoppe (Science); Valentina Kerst (Economic Policy, Economic Development, Tourism and Digital Society) |
| Minister for Labour, Social Affairs, Health, Women and Family | Heike Werner born 30 May 1969 | LINKE | 5 December 2014 | 5 February 2020 | Ines Feierabend |
| Minister for Infrastructure and Agriculture | Birgit Keller born 28 January 1959 (age 66) | LINKE | 5 December 2014 | 26 November 2019 | Klaus Sühl |
