= Thadäus König =

German politician

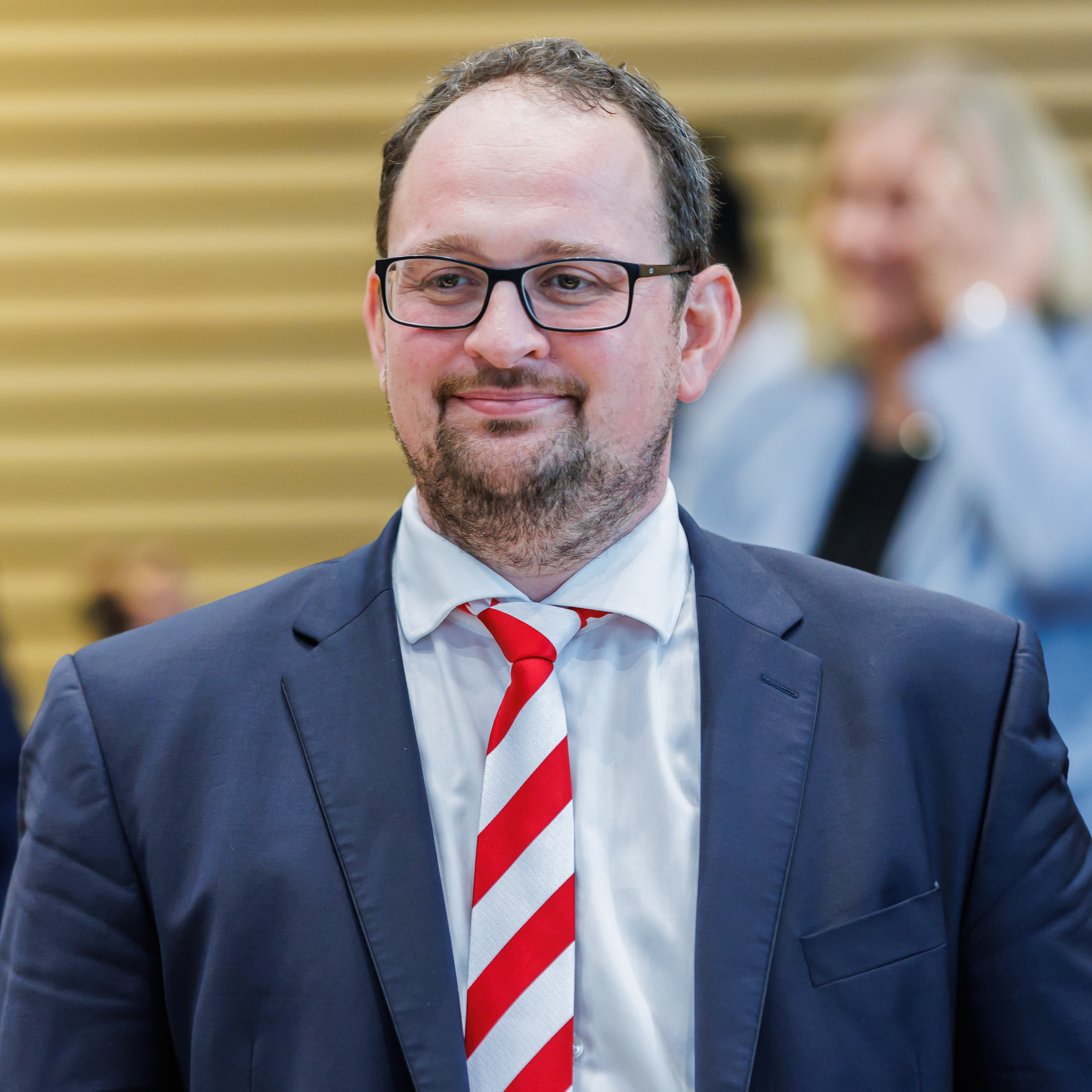
- König in 2024

President of the Landtag of Thuringia
- Incumbent
- Assumed office 28 September 2024
- Preceded by: Birgit Pommer

Member of the Landtag of Thuringia
- Incumbent
- Assumed office 27 October 2019
- Preceded by: Gerold Wucherpfennig
- Constituency: Eichsfeld I
- Majority: 6,803 (24.5%)

Personal details
- Born: 15 June 1982 (age 43) Heilbad Heiligenstadt, East Germany
- Party: CDU (2002–present)

Thadäus König (born 15 June 1982) is a German politician from Christian Democratic Union of Germany (CDU) who was elected to the Landtag of Thuringia in 2019. He has served as President of the Landtag of Thuringia since September 2024.
