= Dieter Althaus =

German politician

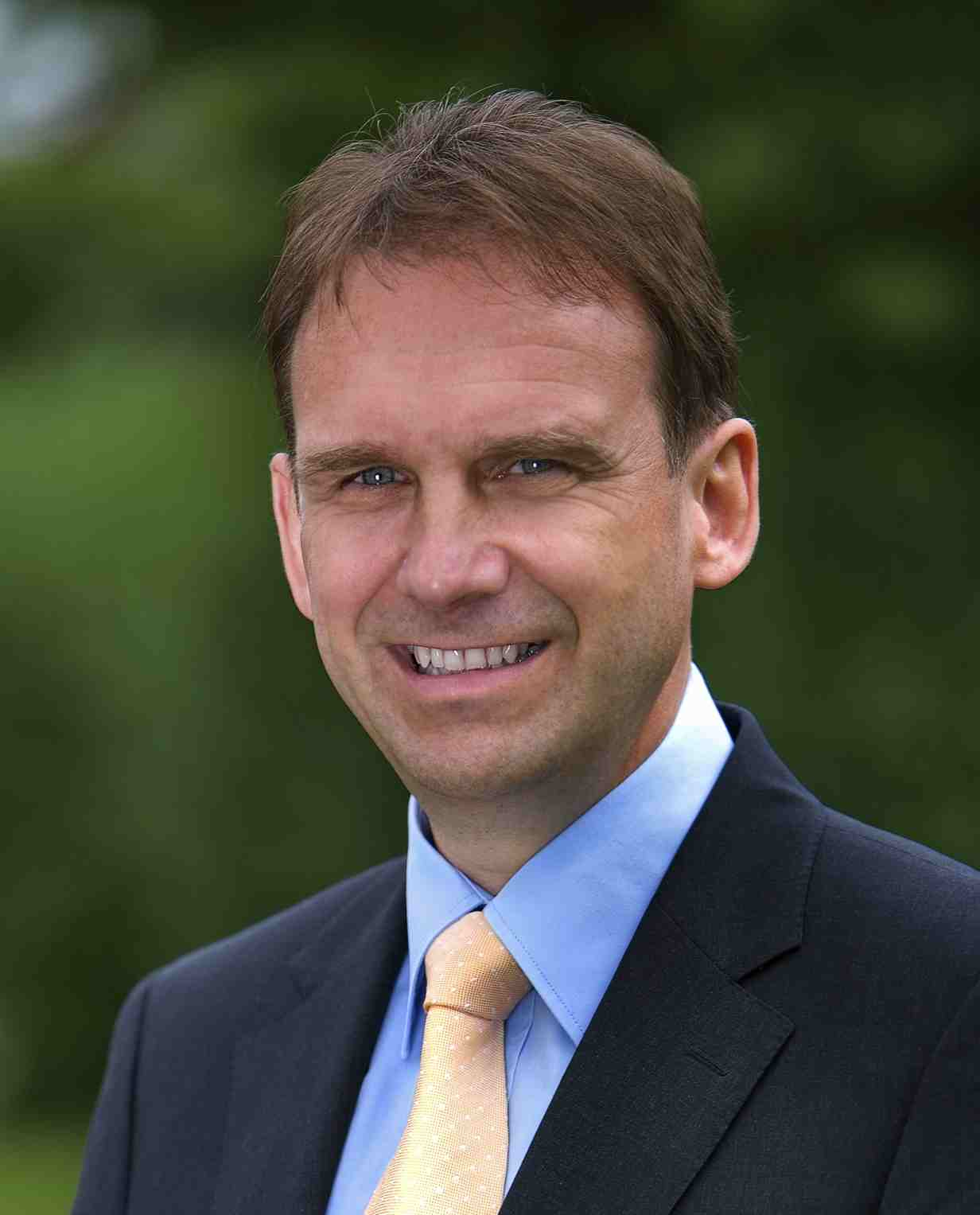
- Althaus in 2008

Minister-President of Thuringia
- In office 5 June 2003 – 30 October 2009
- Deputy: Andreas Trautvetter; Birgit Diezel; Volker Sklenar
- Preceded by: Bernhard Vogel
- Succeeded by: Christine Lieberknecht

President of the Bundesrat
- In office 1 November 2003 – 31 October 2004
- Preceded by: Wolfgang Böhmer
- Succeeded by: Matthias Platzeck

Chairman of the Christian Democratic Union of Thuringia
- In office 2003 – 25 October 2009
- Preceded by: Bernhard Vogel
- Succeeded by: Christine Lieberknecht

Leader of the Christian Democratic Union in the Landtag of Thuringia
- In office 1 October 1999 – 5 June 2003
- Preceded by: Christian Köckert
- Succeeded by: Frank-Michael Pietzsch

Minister of Education of Thuringia
- In office 11 February 1992 – 1 October 1999
- Prime Minister: Bernhard Vogel
- Preceded by: Christine Lieberknecht
- Succeeded by: Michael Krapp

Member of the Landtag of Thuringia for Eichsfeld I (CDU List; 1990–1994)
- In office 25 October 1990 – 30 April 2010
- Preceded by: Constituency established
- Succeeded by: Manfred Scherer

Personal details
- Born: 29 June 1958 (age 67) Heilbad Heiligenstadt, Thuringia, German Democratic Republic
- Occupation: Politician

Dieter Althaus (born 29 June 1958 in Heiligenstadt/Eichsfeld) is a German politician of the Christian Democratic Union (CDU). He served as the 3rd Minister President of Thuringia from 2003 to 2009. In 2003/04 he was the 58th President of the Bundesrat.

== Early career ==
Althaus was a teacher for Physics and Mathematics at the Polytechnic Secondary School in Geismar, Thuringia, from 1983 to 1989, where he became deputy headteacher in 1987.

== Political career ==
Since 1985 Althaus has been a member of the CDU, remaining with the party as it transformed itself from a loyal supporter of the GDR's ruling Socialist Unity Party of Germany (SED) to a loyal supporter of the West German party of the same name with which it merged in 1990 shortly after German reunification. In 2000 he became chairman of the CDU in Thuringia. Since 1990 he has been a member of the Thuringian Landtag.

In 1992 he became a member of Bernhard Vogel's cabinet as State Minister of Cultural Affairs and Education.

On 5 June 2003 Althaus was elected Minister President of Thuringia; he succeeded Bernhard Vogel, who had resigned for reasons of age. As Minister-President he served as President of the Bundesrat in 2003/04. Althaus was also part of the CDU/CSU team in the negotiations with the SPD on a coalition agreement following the 2005 federal elections, which paved the way to the formation of Chancellor Angela Merkel’s first government.

After the Thuringia elections of 2009, where the CDU went from having an absolute majority to not even having enough seats to form a majority coalition with the FDP, Althaus resigned as Minister-President and as chairman of the CDU in Thuringia.

== Later career ==
Since 2010, Althaus has been working for Magna International.

Althaus was nominated by his party as delegate to the Federal Convention for the purpose of electing the President of Germany in 2022.

== Political views ==
In 2006 Althaus spoke out in favour of a universal basic income.

== Other activities ==
=== Corporate boards ===
- VR-Bank Bad Salzungen Schmalkalden, Member of the Supervisory Board (–2023)

=== Non-profit organizations ===
- Central Committee of German Catholics, Member
- Gegen Vergessen – Für Demokratie, Member of the Board

== Personal life ==
=== 2009 skiing accident ===
Althaus caused a skiing collision in Styria, Austria on 1 January 2009 in which he suffered severe injuries. Althaus was skiing down an expert run, but wandered onto an easy slope, where he was skiing in the wrong direction, whereupon he and a 41-year-old Slovak woman collided. The woman subsequently died from her injuries. Althaus was wearing a skiing helmet, while the woman was not. Althaus was fined €33,300 for negligent homicide.

=== Family ===
Althaus is married to Katharina and has two children.
