= Schöneck, Saxony =

Schöneck
- Town
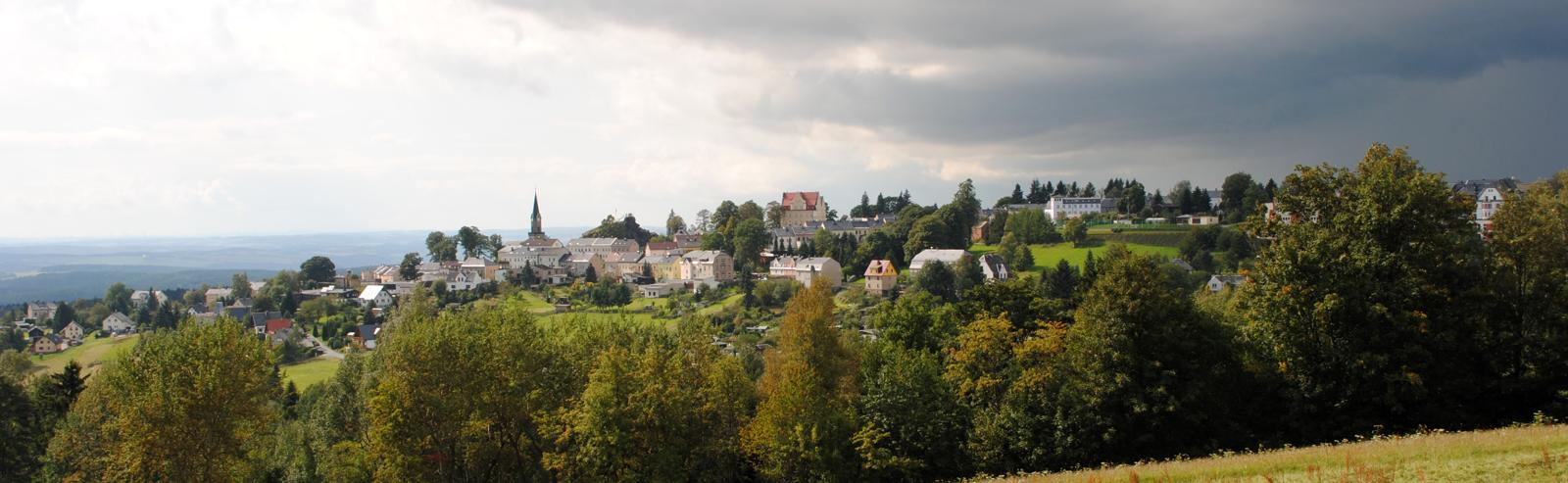
- Panorama of Schöneck

- Coat of arms

- Location of Schöneck within Vogtlandkreis district
- Interactive map of Schöneck
- Location within Germany Location within Saxony
- Coordinates: 50°22′N 12°19′E
- Country: Germany
- State: Saxony
- District: Vogtlandkreis

Government
  - Mayor (2023–30): Andy Anders

Area
  - Total: 55.06 km^{2} (21.26 sq mi)
- Elevation: 707 m (2,320 ft)

Population (2025-12-31)
  - Total: 2,850
  - Density: 51.8/km^{2} (134/sq mi)
- Time zone: UTC+01:00 (CET)
  - Summer (DST): UTC+02:00 (CEST)
- Postal codes: 08261
- Dialling codes: 037464
- Vehicle registration: V, AE, OVL, PL, RC
- Website: www.stadt-schoeneck.de

Schöneck (German pronunciation: [ˈʃøːnɛk]; also: Schöneck/Vogtl.) is a town in the Vogtlandkreis district, in the Free State of Saxony, Germany. It is situated 18 km (11 mi) southeast of Plauen, and 35 km (22 mi) north of Cheb. Schöneck is known as the biggest ski resort in the eastern part of Germany. With more than 700 m (church) it is the highest-located town in the Vogtland district. It is in the 'music corner', a region so-called because of its history of production of musical instruments.

== Town structure ==
The districts of Schöneck are Arnoldsgrün, Eschenbach, Gunzen, Korna, Kottenheide, Schilbach and Zwotental.

== History ==
Schöneck became a town in 1370, but was first mentioned a century before this, when the castle castrum Schoennecke was mentioned as a mediaeval manor.

After some devastating major fires (1632, 1680, 1761 and 1856), Schöneck took part in the industrialization of the 19th century. The town's main business became the cigar manufactory. In 1875, the railroad to Falkenstein and Klingenthal was built. The population grew significantly until World War II, but later the population contracted again.

=== Historical population ===
Historical population growth and decline (from 1998, as of 31 December):

Year	Inhabitants
1834	1,680
1890	3,270
1912	4,896
1971	3,722
1983	3,500
1998	3,951
1999	3,913
2000	3,889
2001	3,802

Year	Inhabitants
2002	3,775
2003	3,752
2004	3,721
2007	3,603
2008	3,524
2012	3,343
2013	3,318
2016	3,198

Data source since 1998: the state office of statistics of Saxony

== Personalities ==
- Christian Gottlob Steinmüller (1792-1862), organ builder, born in Arnoldsgrün
- Kurt Demmler (1943-2009), songwriter and lyricist, completed an internship in the hospital in 1962/63
- Birgit Klaubert (born 1954), politician in (The Left), former vice president of the Thuringian parliament, since 2014 Minister of Education, Youth and Sports in Thuringia
