= Peter-Michael Diestel =

German politician and lawyer

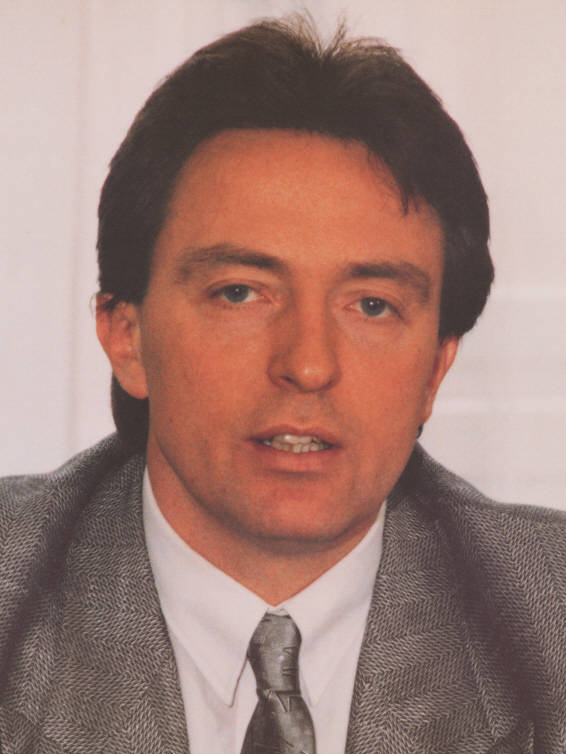
- Diestel (1990)

Deputy Minister-President
- In office 12 April 1990 – 2 October 1990
- Minister-President: Lothar de Maizière
- Preceded by: Christa Luft; Peter Moreth; Lothar de Maizière
- Succeeded by: Hans-Dietrich Genscher (as Vice Chancellor of Germany)

Minister of the Interior
- In office 12 April 1990 – 2 October 1990
- Minister-President: Lothar de Maizière
- Preceded by: Lothar Ahrendt
- Succeeded by: Wolfgang Schäuble (as Minister of the Interior of Germany)

Member of the Volkskammer for Leipzig
- In office 5 April 1990 – 2 October 1990
- Preceded by: Constituency established
- Succeeded by: Constituency abolished
Brandenburg state politics
Leader of the Opposition in the Landtag of Brandenburg
In office 26 October 1990 – 8 May 1992
Minister-President	Manfred Stolpe
Preceded by	Position established
Succeeded by	Dieter Helm
Leader of the Christian Democratic Union in the Landtag of Brandenburg
In office 26 October 1990 – 8 May 1992
Preceded by	Position established
Succeeded by	Dieter Helm
Member of the Landtag of Brandenburg for Frankfurt/Oder I
In office 26 October 1990 – 11 October 1994
Preceded by	Constituency established
Succeeded by	Manfred Rademacher (Oder-Spree III/Frankfurt (Oder))

Personal details
- Born: 14 February 1952 (age 74) Prora, Binz, Bezirk Rostock, East Germany (now Mecklenburg-Vorpommern, Germany)
- Party: Independent
- Other political affiliations: Christian Democratic Union (1990–2021); Christian Democratic Union (East) (1990); German Social Union (1990); Christlich-soziale Partei Deutschlands (1989–1990)
- Education: Karl Marx University Leipzig
- Occupation: Politician; Lawyer; Animal Technician
- Website: Official law practice website

Peter-Michael Diestel (born 14 February 1952) is a German lawyer and former politician (independent, formerly DSU, CDU). He was the last Interior Minister of East Germany, under Prime Minister Lothar de Maizière (1990). As such, he represented the DDR in the negotiations on the unification treaty. He was then a member of the Brandenburg state parliament until 1994.

== Biography ==
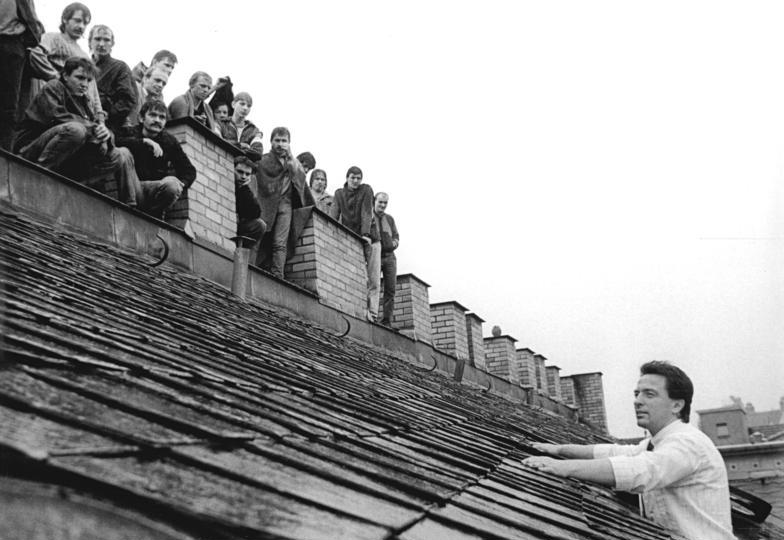
Diestel on the roof of a detention center during a detainee revolt on 9 July 1990

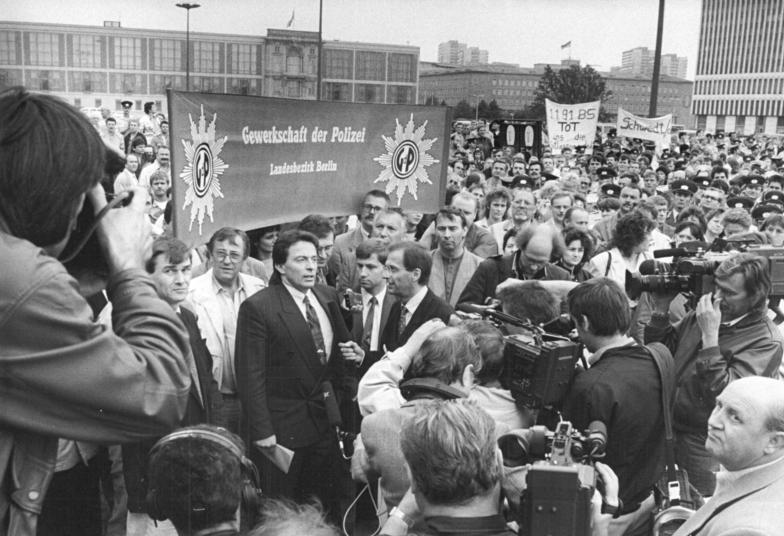
Diestel at a demonstration by members of the police on 19 July 1990

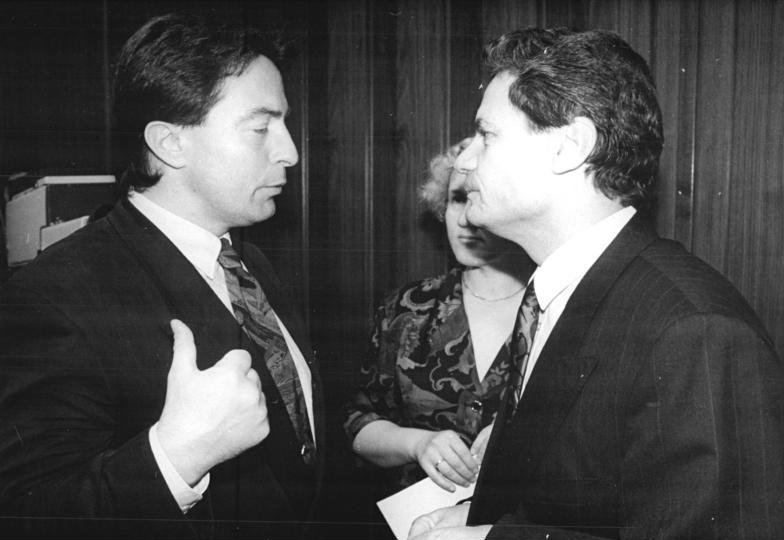
Diestel with Joachim Gauck on 28 September 1990.

Diestel's father was a major, first in the armed forces, later in the NVA and lecturer at the Friedrich Engels Military Academy.

Diestel was born in Prora, Kreis Rügen into an East German military family. He completed vocational training in 1972 as a skilled worker for cattle breeding, but was initially not allowed to study for political reasons. He was therefore active as a swimming instructor, lifeguard and cattle breeder before he studied law at Karl Marx University Leipzig from 1974 to 1978. As a high school graduate, Diestel said he joined the East German party CDU and left again after a few months. “They cheered even louder than the SED, and that really irritated me that Christians placed their Christian faith under the dogma of Marxism-Leninism. That was nothing for me. That’s why I was out there again quickly,” said Diestel in November 2019, looking back. According to Diestel, he was always a “big fan of Franz-Josef Strauss”. He saw Strauss as his role mode, he said.

He was honored as a "Honored Milker of the People". He later worked as head of the legal department of the Agricultural Industry Association Delitzsch from 1978 to 1989. In 1986, he earned his doctorate's degree with a doctoral thesis on LPG law.

In December 1989, Diestel co-founded the German Social Union (Christlich-Soziale Partei Deutschlands or CSPD) and, in January 1990, the German Social Union (DSU), where he was the general secretary until June.

From March to October 1990, Diestel was a member of the Volkskammer and from April to October, Deputy Prime Minister and successor to Lothar Ahrendt as Minister of Interior of the GDR. In June 1990, he left the DSU and was, by 3 August, a member of the CDU. On 7 June 1990, on the initiative of Diestel, RAF terrorist Susanne Albrecht was arrested, and thereafter, the admission of nine other RAF members into the GDR became known. On 1 July 1990, together with Wolfgang Schäuble, he signed the contract for the dismantling of the border fortifications between the GDR and the Federal Republic. In his term in 1990, there was a transfer of Stasi-intercepted files about West German politicians to the Federal Office for the Protection of the Constitution.

Critics accused him during his time as Minister of Interior for the perceived trivial handling of former employees of the Stasi, who remained employed at the Ministry of Interior. Diestel later explained this decision as follows: "If you command a hundred police officers, you have to have learned that. If you want to lead a thousand police officers or a ministry, then you have to have graduated from an academy, then you have to be qualified for it. And that's why I didn't kick out colonels and generals […] During my term in office not a single politically motivated shot was fired […] there were no upheavals and I'm with these people just the way they were into German unity. And that is a result that I could not have achieved without these Stasi officers, without these police generals, customs generals […]." In mid-May 1990, the press reported on the plans of the Ministry of Interior, the former head of the foreign intelligence service of the Ministry for State Security, Markus Wolf, to consult on the dismantling of the State Security Service. Diestel was clearly criticized for this by the federal government and the SPD. Wolf was not appointed to the GDR government committee, but Diestel announced, according to the press, that he would make use of Wolf's knowledge. A few days later, the Ministry of the Interior denied that Wolf should have been hired as a consultant. In the course of May 1990, the parliamentary group in his party called for Diestel's resignation as Minister of the Interior. Furthermore, many Stasi files were destroyed in his administration, including the destruction of files of the Main Directorate for Reconnaissance. According to Diestel's own statements, he had nothing to do with the exterminations, which are said to have been carried out before the beginning of his term of office. Diestel sued journalists and publishers who had reported that he was "the last interior minister in the GDR to be jointly responsible for the destruction of some of the Stasi files". On 10 July 1995, the Hanseatic Higher Regional Court in Hamburg ruled that Diestel was politically responsible for the destruction of files from the Ministry for State Security during his tenure as Interior Minister of the GDR. Diestel later explained that he had campaigned politically for the files to be destroyed and had been supported in this regard by Chancellor Helmut Kohl and Interior Minister Wolfgang Schäuble. In 2019, he said in retrospect, "The opinion later changed when it was noticed that the files that relate to the actual one's own comrade, namely from the old federal territory were already gone and that the Russians already have alike. The files were sorted out. Before the free, democratic De Maizière government came to power, the state security had six to nine months to remove their own people from these files. That's why you can say that the state security took care of it: Who can survive after the fall of communism and who is killed in the Stasi files? The simple ones were beaten to death." According to Diestel, he did not give the order for the files to be destroyed; that was illegal during his tenure.

During the first election of the Landtag of Brandenburg on 14 October 1990, he was vetted as the CDU's top candidate, but was defeated by Manfred Stolpe of the SPD, who formed the first democratic state government of the re-established state of Brandenburg.

Subsequently, Diestel belonged to the Landtag of Brandenburg as a member until 1994. From 1990 until his resignation in 1992, partly because of the controversial petrol station privatization in Brandenburg, he was the first faction leader of the CDU, as well as the first opposition leader in the Landtag. As a co-initiator of the "Committee for Justice", he encouraged the committee to launch an inquiry into Stolpe - however, later in connection with his still controversial Stasi contacts, Stolpe made a personal declaration of honor for him. Diestel published a statement in 1993 with others calling for "reconciliation instead of retribution".

Diestel has been running a law firm in Potsdam since 1993; he also manages other offices in Berlin, Leipzig, Güstrow and Zislow, his place of residence. In his practice, he represented, inter alia, former full-time Stasi staff, Stasi IM, those suspected of doping former East German athletes, and GDR sports officials. In 2004, he worked as legal counsel for PDS' leading candidate for the Landtag election in Saxony, Peter Porsch, who was suspected of being involved in Stasi activities. In 2005, he took over as part of the football betting scandal, the mandate for football referee Torsten Koop. Furthermore, he represented the athletics coach Thomas Springstein in 2005, who had administered the injection of drugs in minors. In 2006, he represented the ARD sports coordinator Hagen Boßdorf, who was accused of being a Stasi agent. He also initially represented Jan Ullrich during the Operación Puerto doping case. On 24 May 2007, however, he ended his representation for Ullrich; Ullrich's manager Wolfgang Strohband said that Ullrich had him withdraw representation because of a television appearance where Diestel said he had resigned due to disagreements. In the Volkswagen corruption affair regarding the bribery of Volkswagen work councils, Diestel was defender of the former VW Work Council Chairman Klaus Volkert.

From 1994 to 1997, Diestel served as president of the football club Hansa Rostock and is the honorary president of SC Potsdam.

In the Puhdys' club song, the group described Diestel as the "most beautiful soccer president in the world". During his tenure as Hansa chairman, Diestel had his headquarters as a lawyer in a villa in Güstrow. In November 1994, Focus described Diestel as a "PR monomaniac" who loved "the public eye above all else". Whenever things get tricky for him, he "gets out of the way to show up somewhere else". Diestel was "a bit dazzling, a bit vague, a bit flirtatious," the news magazine continued. Gregor Gysi, whom Diestel met in December 1989 and whom he describes as his friend ("who has a world view that is not mine"), said of Diestel that he "didn't really fit in with politics from the start" since it also doesn't matter to him "whether he messes with his party, with me or with someone else". According to Manfred Stolpe, Diestel is “an important and interesting personality in the transition from the GDR to German unity,"who courageously stood at the forefront "of the mass protests in Leipzig autumn 1989." In April 2021, Diestel announced his resignation from the CDU, which had become a "spongy and helpless chancellor electoral association." Diestel has had three marriages, the most recent of which has been ongoing since 2014.[10] At the wedding in Zislow, Gregor Gysi and Lothar de Maizière were the witnesses. Egon Krenz was also among the guests.

Diestel has had three marriages, the most recent of which has been ongoing since 2014. At the wedding in Zislow, Gregor Gysi and Lothar de Maizière were the witnesses. Egon Krenz was also among the guests.

== Infidelity proceedings ==
Diestel was found guilty of Embezzlement in 2001, the Berlin district court imposed a fine of 9,900 marks on probation and issued a warning. In addition, a fine of 20,000 marks was imposed. In 1990 he had acquired a villa in Zeuthen, which had previously been used as a guest house by the GDR Ministry of the Interior, at a price well below its value. He bought the 3,500 square meter lake property from his ministry for 193,00 marks – estimated on the basis of the old GDR's price law. The property is said to have been worth 770,00 marks. In 1994 he had to return the property.

== Works ==
- Peter-Michael Diestel, Jürgen Helfricht, Dieter Mechtel: D wie Diestel. Bouvier, Bonn 1990, ISBN 3-416-02275-0.
- Gregor Gysi, Peter-Michael Diestel, Guido Westerwelle, Gabi Zimmer: Neue Gespräche über Gott und die Welt. Schwarzkopf & Schwarzkopf, Berlin 2000, ISBN 3-89602-351-9.

Political offices
Preceded by Lothar Ahrendt	Minister of Interior; 1990	Succeeded by Gustav Heinemann (as Minister of the Interior of Germany)
