= Gotha II (constituency) =

Electoral constituency in Thuringia, Germany

Gotha II is an electoral constituency (German: Wahlkreis) represented in the Landtag of Thuringia. It elects one member via first-past-the-post voting. Under the current constituency numbering system, it is designated as constituency 15. It covers the central part of the district of Gotha, around the city of Gotha.

Gotha II was created in 1990 for the first state election. Since 2009, it has been represented by Stephan Steinbrück of the Alternative for Germany (AfD).

== Geography ==
As of the 2019 state election, Gotha II covers the central part of the district of Gotha, around the city of Gotha. It comprises just two municipalities: Gotha and Hörsel.

== Members ==
The constituency was held by the Christian Democratic Union from its creation in 1990 until 2009, during which time it was represented by Josef Duchac (1990–1994), Johanna Köhler (1994–1999), and Evelin Groß (1999–2009). It was won by the Social Democratic Party in 2009, and was represented by Matthias Hey - he was re-elected in 2014 and 2019. In 2024, Stephan Steinbrück of the AfD won the seat.

Election	Member	Party	%
1990	Josef Duchac	CDU	48.8
1994	Johanna Köhler	CDU	36.2
1999	Evelin Groß	CDU	45.6
2004	Evelin Groß	CDU	40.7
2009	Matthias Hey	SPD	40.6
2014	Matthias Hey	SPD	38.9
2019	Matthias Hey	SPD	38.2
2024	Stephan Steinbrück	AfD	34.7

== Election results ==
=== 2024 election ===
State election (2024): Gotha II
Notes:	Blue background denotes the winner of the electorate vote. Pink background denotes a candidate elected from their party list. Yellow background denotes an electorate win by a list member, or other incumbent. A ✓ or ✗ denotes status of any incumbent, win or lose respectively.						
Party	Candidate	Votes	%	±%	Party votes	%	±%
AfD	Stephan Steinbrück	8,320	34.7	▲12.0	7,808	32.3	▲9.8
SPD	✗ Matthias Hey	8,289	34.6	▼3.6	3,031	12.6	▼3.8
BSW					3,572	14.8	
CDU	Marion Rosin	4,557	19.0	▲4.4	4,833	20.0	▲3.9
Left	Sebastian Vogt	2,178	9.1	▼8.3	3,116	12.9	▼18.2
Greens					573	2.4	▼2.2
Independent	Birger Gröning	310	1.3				
FDP	Torsten Klöppel	305	1.3	▼1.9	281	0.9	▼2.8
APT					275	1.1	▲0.1
FW					246	1.0	
Values					118	0.5	
Familie					113	0.5	
BD					95	0.4	
Pirates					82	0.3	▼0.4
ÖDP					34	0.1	▼0.2
MLPD					28	0.1	▼0.3
Informal votes		398			215		
Total valid votes		23,959			24,142		
Turnout		24,357	66.6	▲8.0			
AfD gain from SPD	Majority	31	0.1				

=== 2019 election ===
State election (2019): Gotha II
Notes:	Blue background denotes the winner of the electorate vote. Pink background denotes a candidate elected from their party list. Yellow background denotes an electorate win by a list member, or other incumbent. A ✓ or ✗ denotes status of any incumbent, win or lose respectively.						
Party	Candidate	Votes	%	±%	Party votes	%	±%
SPD	✓ Matthias Hey	8,433	38.2	▼0.7	3,636	16.4	▼2.4
AfD	Stephan Steinbrück	5,016	22.7		4,976	22.5	▲12.1
Left	Bernd Fundheller	3,843	17.4	▼6.3	6,875	31.1	▲3.0
CDU	Marion Rosin	3,212	14.6	▼10.3	3,557	16.1	▼11.5
Greens	Felix Kalbe	847	3.8	▼0.4	1,014	4.6	▼0.1
FDP	Martin Steinbrück	714	3.2	▲0.4	823	3.7	▲1.7
List-only parties					1,232	5.6	
Informal votes		322			274		
Total valid votes		22,065			22,113		
Turnout		22,387	58.6	▲10.0			
SPD hold	Majority	3,417	15.5	▲1.5			

=== 2014 election ===
State election (2014): Gotha II
Notes:	Blue background denotes the winner of the electorate vote. Pink background denotes a candidate elected from their party list. Yellow background denotes an electorate win by a list member, or other incumbent. A ✓ or ✗ denotes status of any incumbent, win or lose respectively.						
Party	Candidate	Votes	%	±%	Party votes	%	±%
SPD	✓ Matthias Hey	7,474	38.9	▼1.7	3,650	18.8	▼7.1
CDU	Evelin Groß	4,781	24.9	▼0.1	5,347	27.6	▲0.6
Left	Bernd Fundheller	4,557	23.7	▲1.0	5,451	28.1	▲1.9
AfD					2,010	10.4	
NPD	Angela Winderstein	1,053	5.5	0.0	771	4.0	▼1.1
Greens	Tyra Falta	816	4.2		916	4.7	▼1.0
FDP	Martin Steinbrück	543	2.8	▼3.4	390	2.0	▼4.3
List-only parties					838	4.3	
Informal votes		400			251		
Total valid votes		19,224			19,373		
Turnout		19,624	48.6	▼5.1			
SPD hold	Majority	2,693	14.0	▼1.6			

=== 2009 election ===
State election (2009): Gotha II
Notes:	Blue background denotes the winner of the electorate vote. Pink background denotes a candidate elected from their party list. Yellow background denotes an electorate win by a list member, or other incumbent. A ✓ or ✗ denotes status of any incumbent, win or lose respectively.						
Party	Candidate	Votes	%	±%	Party votes	%	±%
SPD	Matthias Hey	8,998	40.6	▲24.2	5,750	25.9	▲11.4
CDU	✗ Evelin Groß	5,548	25.0	▼15.7	6,005	27.0	▼12.6
Left	Bernd Fundheller	5,024	22.7	▼9.8	5,810	26.2	▼2.8
FDP	Torsten Köhler-Hohlfeld	1,371	6.2	▲1.0	1,393	6.3	▲2.7
Greens					1,269	5.7	▲1.0
NPD	Klaus Städler	1,218	5.5		1,143	5.1	▲4.0
List-only parties					836	3.8	
Informal votes		405			358		
Total valid votes		22,159			22,206		
Turnout		22,564	53.7	▲1.9			
SPD gain from CDU	Majority	3,450	15.6				

=== 2004 election ===
State election (2004): Gotha II
Notes:	Blue background denotes the winner of the electorate vote. Pink background denotes a candidate elected from their party list. Yellow background denotes an electorate win by a list member, or other incumbent. A ✓ or ✗ denotes status of any incumbent, win or lose respectively.						
Party	Candidate	Votes	%	±%	Party votes	%	±%
CDU	✓ Evelin Groß	8,608	40.7	▼4.9	8,472	39.6	▼7.2
PDS	Vera Fitzke	6,870	32.5	▲6.7	6,208	29.0	▲6.0
SPD	Helmut Rieth	3,474	16.4	▼8.3	3,109	14.5	▼5.4
Greens	Tobias Franke-Polz	1,102	5.2		994	4.7	▲2.7
FDP	Mike Wündsch	1,094	5.2	▲3.6	762	3.6	▲2.8
List-only parties					1,830	8.6	
Informal votes		1,054			827		
Total valid votes		21,148			21,375		
Turnout		22,202	51.8	▼4.6			
CDU hold	Majority	1,738	8.2	▼11.6			

=== 1999 election ===
State election (1999): Gotha II
Notes:	Blue background denotes the winner of the electorate vote. Pink background denotes a candidate elected from their party list. Yellow background denotes an electorate win by a list member, or other incumbent. A ✓ or ✗ denotes status of any incumbent, win or lose respectively.						
Party	Candidate	Votes	%	±%	Party votes	%	±%
CDU	Evelin Groß	11,101	45.6	▲9.4	11,469	46.8	▲10.0
PDS	Heide Wildauer	6,265	25.8	▲8.1	5,639	23.0	▲6.4
SPD	Helmut Rieth	6,004	24.7	▼11.4	4,877	19.9	▼15.4
REP	Hartwig Bastian	547	2.2		153	0.6	▼0.3
FDP	Mike Wündsch	401	1.6	▼1.2	206	0.8	▼1.7
List-only parties					2,137	8.7	
Informal votes		428			265		
Total valid votes		24,318			24,481		
Turnout		24,746	56.4	▼15.1			
CDU hold	Majority	4,836	19.8	▲19.7			

=== 1994 election ===
State election (1994): Gotha II
Notes:	Blue background denotes the winner of the electorate vote. Pink background denotes a candidate elected from their party list. Yellow background denotes an electorate win by a list member, or other incumbent. A ✓ or ✗ denotes status of any incumbent, win or lose respectively.						
Party	Candidate	Votes	%	±%	Party votes	%	±%
CDU	Johanna Köhler	11,354	36.2	▼12.6	11,570	36.8	▼10.6
SPD		11,333	36.1	▲11.7	11,110	35.3	▲9.5
PDS		5,549	17.7	▲12.8	5,213	16.6	▲11.7
Greens		2,248	7.2	▲2.9	1,796	5.7	▲1.3
FDP		872	2.8	▼7.2	798	2.5	▼8.3
List-only parties					955	3.0	
Informal votes		809			723		
Total valid votes		31,356			31,442		
Turnout		32,165	71.5	▼5.6			
CDU hold	Majority	21	0.1	▼22.3			

=== 1990 election ===
State election (1990): Gotha II
Notes:	Blue background denotes the winner of the electorate vote. Pink background denotes a candidate elected from their party list. Yellow background denotes an electorate win by a list member, or other incumbent. A ✓ or ✗ denotes status of any incumbent, win or lose respectively.						
Party	Candidate	Votes	%	±%	Party votes	%	±%
CDU	Josef Duchac	18,950	48.8		18,404	47.4	
SPD		9,467	24.4		10,017	25.8	
FDP		3,890	10.0		4,187	10.8	
DSU		1,998	5.1		1,435	3.7	
PDS		1,900	4.9		1,921	4.9	
Greens		1,654	4.3		1,710	4.4	
REP		541	1.4		371	1.0	
UFV		406	1.0		285	0.7	
List-only parties					488	1.3	
Informal votes		1,355			1,343		
Total valid votes		38,806			38,818		
Turnout		40,161	77.1				
CDU win new seat	Majority	9,483	24.4				
