= Hildburghausen I – Schmalkalden-Meiningen III =

Electoral constituency in Thuringia, Germany

Hildburghausen I – Schmalkalden-Meiningen III is an electoral constituency (German: Wahlkreis) represented in the Landtag of Thuringia. It elects one member via first-past-the-post voting. Under the current constituency numbering system, it is designated as constituency 18. It covers the western part of Hildburghausen district and part of southern Schmalkalden-Meiningen.

Hildburghausen I – Schmalkalden-Meiningen III was created in 1990 for the first state election. Originally named Hildburghausen I, it was given its current name in 2014 after part of Schmalkalden-Meiningen was transferred to the constituency. Since 2019, it has been represented by Nadine Hoffmann of Alternative for Germany (AfD).

== Geography ==
As of the 2019 state election, Hildburghausen I – Schmalkalden-Meiningen III covers the western part of Hildburghausen district and part of southern Schmalkalden-Meiningen, specifically the municipalities of Ahlstädt, Beinerstadt, Bischofrod, Dingsleben, Ehrenberg, Eichenberg, Grimmelshausen, Grub, Heldburg, Henfstädt, Hildburghausen, Kloster Veßra, Lengfeld, Marisfeld, Oberstadt, Reurieth, Römhild, Schlechtsart, Schmeheim, Schweickershausen, St.Bernhard, Straufhain, Themar, Ummerstadt, Veilsdorf, and Westhausen (from Hildburghausen), and Grabfeld (without Wölfershausen) from Schmalkalden-Meiningen.

== Members ==
The constituency was held by the Christian Democratic Union from its creation in 1990 until 2009, during which time it was represented by Hans-Henning Axthelm (1990–1994), Heinrich Dietz (1994–2004), and Michael Krapp (2004–2009). It was won by The Left in 2009, and was represented by Tilo Kummer. The CDU's candidate Kristin Floßmann regained the constituency in 2014. It was won by Alternative for Germany in 2019, and is represented by Nadine Hoffmann.

Election	Member	Party	%
1990	Hans-Henning Axthelm	CDU	43.9
1994	Heinrich Dietz	CDU	37.7
1999	Heinrich Dietz	CDU	46.7
2004	Michael Krapp	CDU	43.5
2009	Tilo Kummer	LINKE	35.1
2014	Kristin Floßmann	CDU	36.6
2019	Nadine Hoffmann	AfD	29.0
2024	Nadine Hoffmann	AfD	40.0

== Election results ==
=== 2024 election ===
State election (2024): Hildburghausen I/Schmalkalden-Meiningen III
Notes:	Blue background denotes the winner of the electorate vote. Pink background denotes a candidate elected from their party list. Yellow background denotes an electorate win by a list member, or other incumbent. A ✓ or ✗ denotes status of any incumbent, win or lose respectively.						
Party	Candidate	Votes	%	±%	Party votes	%	±%
AfD	✓ Nadine Hoffmann	9,835	41.6	▲12.6	9,531	40.0	▲12.3
CDU	Erik Fritz Guido Beiersdorfer	5,923	25.1	▼0.3	4,837	20.3	▼3.0
BSW					3,550	14.9	
FW	Andreas Hummel	3,410	14.4		1,476	6.2	
Left	Kevin Zöller	2,296	9.7	▼14.6	2,285	9.6	▼18.0
SPD	Thomas Jacob	1,434	6.1	▼4.1	913	3.8	▼3.9
ÖDP	Nicole Kreussel	718	3.0		166	0.7	Steady
Greens					277	1.2	▼2.5
Values					189	0.8	
APT					170	0.7	▼0.4
FDP					149	0.6	▼3.5
BD					105	0.4	
Familie					103	0.4	
Pirates					63	0.3	▼0.1
MLPD					19	0.1	▼0.3
Informal votes		398			181		
Total valid votes		23,616			23,833		
Turnout		24,014	73.8	▲9.0			
AfD hold	Majority	3,912	16.5	▲12.9			

=== 2019 election ===
State election (2019): Hildburghausen I – Schmalkalden-Meiningen III
Notes:	Blue background denotes the winner of the electorate vote. Pink background denotes a candidate elected from their party list. Yellow background denotes an electorate win by a list member, or other incumbent. A ✓ or ✗ denotes status of any incumbent, win or lose respectively.						
Party	Candidate	Votes	%	±%	Party votes	%	±%
AfD	Nadine Hoffmann	6,301	29.0	▲19.2	6,037	27.7	▲16.8
CDU	✗ Kristin Floßmann	5,519	25.4	▼11.2	5,094	23.3	▼14.1
Left	Steffen Martin Harzer	5,279	24.3	▼6.0	6,034	27.6	▲0.2
SPD	Thomas Jakob	2,206	10.2	▼3.9	1,681	7.7	▼3.8
Greens	Katharina Schmidt	1,336	6.2	▲2.7	816	3.7	▼0.2
FDP	Christopher Hubrich	978	4.5	▲3.3	890	4.1	▲2.7
MLPD	Janine Walter	86	0.4		93	0.4	
List-only parties					1,180	5.4	
Informal votes		388			268		
Total valid votes		21,705			21,825		
Turnout		22,093	64.8	▲14.3			
AfD gain from CDU	Majority	782	3.6				

=== 2014 election ===
State election (2014): Hildburghausen I
Notes:	Blue background denotes the winner of the electorate vote. Pink background denotes a candidate elected from their party list. Yellow background denotes an electorate win by a list member, or other incumbent. A ✓ or ✗ denotes status of any incumbent, win or lose respectively.						
Party	Candidate	Votes	%	±%	Party votes	%	±%
CDU	Kristin Floßmann	7,408	36.6	▲4.8	7,536	37.2	▲6.8
Left	✗ Tilo Kummer	6,123	30.3	▼4.8	5,599	27.7	▼4.7
SPD	Uwe Höhn	2,849	14.1	▼2.7	2,351	11.6	▼5.4
AfD	Heiko Bernardy	1,985	9.8		2,206	10.9	
Greens	Astrid Rühle	716	3.5	▼1.1	785	3.9	▼0.8
NPD	Tommy Frenck	608	3.0	▼1.7	739	3.7	▼0.8
Pirates	Bernd Schreiner	290	1.4		282	1.4	
FDP	Heinz-Jörg Winkler	247	1.2	▼5.9	281	1.4	▼5.6
List-only parties					464	2.3	
Informal votes		289			272		
Total valid votes		20,226			20,243		
Turnout		20,515	50.5	▼1.9			
CDU gain from Left	Majority	1,285	6.3				

=== 2009 election ===
State election (2009): Hildburghausen I
Notes:	Blue background denotes the winner of the electorate vote. Pink background denotes a candidate elected from their party list. Yellow background denotes an electorate win by a list member, or other incumbent. A ✓ or ✗ denotes status of any incumbent, win or lose respectively.						
Party	Candidate	Votes	%	±%	Party votes	%	±%
Left	Tilo Kummer	6,899	35.1	▲3.4	6,393	32.4	▲5.2
CDU	✗ Michael Krapp	6,251	31.8	▼11.7	5,992	30.4	▼13.1
SPD	Uwe Höhn	3,299	16.8	▼1.4	3,345	17.0	▲1.4
FDP	Thomas Vollmar	1,403	7.1	▲3.3	1,377	7.0	▲3.9
NPD	Danny Schuck	928	4.7		883	4.5	▲2.9
Greens	Karen Thimel	899	4.6	▲1.7	919	4.7	▲1.9
List-only parties					802	4.1	
Informal votes		368			336		
Total valid votes		19,679			19,711		
Turnout		20,047	52.4	▲2.4			
Left gain from CDU	Majority	648	3.3				

=== 2004 election ===
State election (2004): Hildburghausen I
Notes:	Blue background denotes the winner of the electorate vote. Pink background denotes a candidate elected from their party list. Yellow background denotes an electorate win by a list member, or other incumbent. A ✓ or ✗ denotes status of any incumbent, win or lose respectively.						
Party	Candidate	Votes	%	±%	Party votes	%	±%
CDU	Michael Krapp	8,126	43.5	▼3.2	8,141	43.5	▼5.0
PDS	Tilo Kummer	5,930	31.7	▲7.9	5,082	27.2	▲3.8
SPD	Uwe Höhn	3,395	18.2	▼4.8	2,924	15.6	▼3.8
FDP	Jost Hofmann	708	3.8	▲1.8	581	3.1	▲1.7
Greens	Peter Werner Otto	535	2.9	▲1.2	527	2.8	▲1.5
List-only parties					1,447	7.7	
Informal votes		708			700		
Total valid votes		18,694			18,702		
Turnout		19,402	50.0	▼7.3			
CDU hold	Majority	2,196	11.8	▼11.1			

=== 1999 election ===
State election (1999): Hildburghausen I
Notes:	Blue background denotes the winner of the electorate vote. Pink background denotes a candidate elected from their party list. Yellow background denotes an electorate win by a list member, or other incumbent. A ✓ or ✗ denotes status of any incumbent, win or lose respectively.						
Party	Candidate	Votes	%	±%	Party votes	%	±%
CDU	✓ Heinrich Dietz	10,086	46.7	▲9.0	10,523	48.5	▲7.1
PDS	Tilo Kummer	5,147	23.8	▲7.2	5,068	23.4	▲6.1
SPD	Burkhard Stenzel	4,973	23.0	▼6.9	4,208	19.4	▼9.9
REP	Torsten Wirsching	609	2.8	▲1.6	178	0.8	▼0.6
FDP	Lulita Schwenk	429	2.0	▼8.6	308	1.4	▼3.9
Greens	Astrid Rühle von Lilienstern	368	1.7	▼2.4	277	1.3	▼2.5
List-only parties					1,130	5.2	
Informal votes		355			275		
Total valid votes		21,612			21,692		
Turnout		21,967	57.3	▼15.9			
CDU hold	Majority	4,939	22.9	▲15.1			

=== 1994 election ===
State election (1994): Hildburghausen I
Notes:	Blue background denotes the winner of the electorate vote. Pink background denotes a candidate elected from their party list. Yellow background denotes an electorate win by a list member, or other incumbent. A ✓ or ✗ denotes status of any incumbent, win or lose respectively.						
Party	Candidate	Votes	%	±%	Party votes	%	±%
CDU	Heinrich Dietz	9,983	37.7	▼6.2	11,029	41.4	▼2.4
SPD		7,910	29.9	▲8.5	7,791	29.3	▲7.0
PDS		4,397	16.6	▲7.0	4,597	17.3	▲7.5
FDP		2,796	10.6	▲1.2	1,424	5.3	▼4.3
Greens		1,077	4.1	▲0.1	1,018	3.8	▼0.5
REP		327	1.2		367	1.4	
List-only parties					397	1.5	
Informal votes		1,027			894		
Total valid votes		26,490			26,623		
Turnout		27,517	73.2	0.0			
CDU hold	Majority	2,074	7.8	▼14.7			

=== 1990 election ===
State election (1990): Hildburghausen
Notes:	Blue background denotes the winner of the electorate vote. Pink background denotes a candidate elected from their party list. Yellow background denotes an electorate win by a list member, or other incumbent. A ✓ or ✗ denotes status of any incumbent, win or lose respectively.						
Party	Candidate	Votes	%	±%	Party votes	%	±%
CDU	Hans-Henning Axthelm	13,593	43.9		13,598	43.8	
SPD		6,636	21.4		6,934	22.3	
PDS		2,963	9.6		3,034	9.8	
FDP		2,905	9.4		2,978	9.6	
DSU		2,232	7.2		1,547	5.0	
Greens		1,243	4.0		1,349	4.3	
DFD		959	3.1		714	2.3	
UFV		224	0.7		224	0.7	
DBU		202	0.7		156	0.5	
List-only parties					524	1.7	
Informal votes		1,066			965		
Total valid votes		30,957			31,058		
Turnout		32,023	73.2				
CDU win new seat	Majority	6,957	22.5				
