= Gerd Schuchardt =

- Born: 11 March 1942 (age 84); Erfurt (Thuringia), Germany
- Occupations: Electrical research engineer Politician
- Political party: SDP (GDR); SPD

Gerd Schuchardt is an electrical engineer who built his career and reputation in East Germany before 1990 in microprocessor technology and related forward-looking branches of science. He was interested in politics, but had avoided involvement in the country's ruling SED (party) or any of the various so-called "bloc parties" which it controlled. In January 1990, with the winds of political change - somewhat implausibly, as many still thought at the time - blowing across from the Kremlin in Moscow, the party leaders in East Berlin no longer felt able to stand against domestic pressures for a return to democratic politics after more than half a century of one-party dictatorship. Gerd Schuchardt became an activist member of the re-awakening Social Democratic Party. After reunification in October 1990 state-level democratic politics returned to Thuringia: Schuchardt became a leading figure in Thuringian state politics, selected by party members as the Social Democratic Party's lead candidate (and de facto leader in the election campaign) in the 1994 Thuringian state election. He led his party to what turned out to be its best electoral result in Thuringia to date. In the resulting "Grand coalition" government that ensued he served as vice-minister-president until 1999 under the leadership of Bernhard Vogel (CDU) and as Minister for the Sciences, Research and the Arts.

== Biography ==
=== The first 38 years ===
Gerd Schuchardt was born in Erfurt (Thuringia), a midsized city in central southern Germany, at the height of the Second World War. A couple of months after his third birthday war ended in military defeat for Germany and his home region began to be administered as part of the Soviet occupation zone, to be relaunched as the Soviet sponsored "German Democratic Republic" (East Germany) in October 1949. He attended junior and middle schools locally at Greiz and in Erfurt between 1948 and 1956 and then moved on to undertake and complete an apprenticeship as a radio technician. Between 1960 and 1962 he undertook his military service in the People's Army. He then attended the "Arbeiter-und-Bauern-Fakultät" (loosely, "Industrial and Agricultural Workers' College") at Halle between 1962 and 1964, successfully completing his school-level education. From 1964 until 1969 he studied successfully for a degree in Theoretical Elector-technology and Control Systems Engineering at the relatively small specialist Technical University of Ilmenau, a short distance outside Erfurt, to the south.

Between 1969 and 1989 Schuchardt was employed in the Research Centre attached to the Carl Zeiss "Peoples' Own Enterprise" (as it was known at that time) in Jena. Sources state that his research work earned a large amount of money for the enterprise, though it is also recorded that he failed to secure the promotion that his contribution should have justified because of his refusal to join The Party. The value of his contribution was nevertheless officially acknowledged in 1985, when the collective to which he belonged was among that year's recipients of the prestigious National Prize of the German Democratic Republic.

In 1975, while working at the VEB Carl Zeiss, Schuchardt received his doctorate in engineering, in return for work in the field of Production Metrology.

=== Politics ===
Gerd Schuchardt joined the Social Democratic Party in January 1990. The party had become largely irrelevant in East Germany ever since the contentious merger of April 1946 whereby - if only in the Soviet occupation zone - the former Communist Party and (most of) the former Social Democratic Party had come together to form the Socialist Unity Party. During 1989 the party had nevertheless undergone an (initially cautious) revival under the leadership of the Protestant theologians Markus Meckel and Martin Gutzeit. Later that year, in the context of the changes that led to reunification, the eastern and western Social Democratic Parties were themselves reunited. In October 1990 elections were held for membership of the newly reinstated Thuringian Landtag (state parliament). Schuchardt was one of 21 Social Democrat (SPD) members elected to the 89 seat assembly, and was then elected by fellow members to lead the SPD group, serving as "Fraktionsvorsitzender" between 1990 and 1994.

Josef Duchač resigned as Minister-President of Thuringia in 1992 after losing the confidence of members in the Thuringian Landtag (state parliament), when allegations began to surface that before 1990 he had worked for East Germany's widely loathed Ministry for State Security (Stasi). (Twenty-eight years on, Duchač was still contesting the 'Stasi allegations' robustly.) Gerd Schuchardt, as leader of the Social Democratic Party parliamentary group, was one of the two candidates to succeed him. The electors casting their votes were 87 of his fellow Landtag members. Given that the centre-right CDU group held 44 of the 89 seats in the assembly, it was always likely that Bernhard Vogel of the CDU would win the contest, despite the lingering embarrassment over rumours involving Josef Duchač's past. (Duchač had, like Vogel, been a CDU member.) Nevertheless, Schuchardt received 27 votes, which was widely reported as a creditable electoral outcome.

The second post-reunification election to the Landtag of Thuringia took place in October 1994. Schuchardt, having been the leader of the SPD group in the parliament, was now selected by the regional party as their lead candidate. Under his leadership the vote share of the SPD increased, in the first round of the election, by 6.8 points when compared against the 1990 result, to 29.6%. The placing of Schuchardt's name at the top of the party list turned out to have been a piece of unnecessary caution, since he secured direct election as party candidate for the "Jena 2" electoral district. The election turned out to be a high water mark for the SPD. Despite the SPD still being comfortably outpolled by the CDU, no party secured an overall majority of seats, and since the votes for the centrist FDP had collapsed, it was to the SPD (and the PDS, though this choice was not arithmetically essential) that Minister-President Vogel found himself turning in order to secure a broadly-based parliamentary majority for the next five years. Thuringia became just the third of Germany's states in the nation's post-1949 history to be governed by an SPD-CDU "grand coalition".

Along with the deputy leadership of the state government, between 1994 and 1999, Schuchardt served as Minister for the Sciences, Research and the Arts. Between December 1994 and March 1996 he was also president of the Thuringia SPD. For reasons having to do both with national trends and with political divisions within the Thuringia party leadership, Landtag election results in 1999 were disappointing, with the SPD vote share down from 29.6% (1994) to 18.5%. Schuchardt had no longer been lead candidate on the party list. That position now went to Richard Dewes, a lawyer originally from the west. Schuchardt's name was nevertheless in third position, ranked high enough up on the party list to secure his re-election. He remained a Landtag member until 2004, but nevertheless increasingly took a back-seat in terms of state politics and party affairs. He did not seek re-election for a fourth parliamentary term in 2004.

=== Other appointments ===
Gerd Schuchardt has held a number of honorary appointments since 1990, some more time absorbing than other. Among the more important has been, since 2016, his membership of the board at mdr, following a number of years during which he had already held senior oversight roles with the Leipzig-based broadcaster. He has also been involved in similar oversight roles at the Ernst Abbe Foundation, the Pont Alpha prize association for the Kuratorium of German Unity and the SPD's "Forum East".
