= Schmalkalden-Meiningen I =

German electoral constituency

Schmalkalden-Meiningen I is an electoral constituency (German: Wahlkreis) represented in the Landtag of Thuringia. It elects one member via first-past-the-post voting. Under the current constituency numbering system, it is designated as constituency 12. It covers the southern part of Schmalkalden-Meiningen.

Schmalkalden-Meiningen I was created for the 1994 state election. Since 2024, it has been represented by Vivien Rottstedt of Alternative for Germany (AfD).

== Geography ==
As of the 2019 state election, Schmalkalden-Meiningen I covers the southern part of Schmalkalden-Meiningen, specifically the municipalities of Belrieth, Birx, Christes, Dillstädt, Einhausen, Ellingshausen, Erbenhausen, Frankenheim/Rhön, Friedelshausen, Grabfeld (only Wölfershausen), Kaltennordheim (only Aschenhausen, Kaltensundheim, Kaltenwestheim, Melpers, Mittelsdorf, Oberkatz und Unterweid), Kühndorf, Leutersdorf, Mehmels, Meiningen, Neubrunn, Obermaßfeld-Grimmenthal, Oberweid, Rhönblick, Rippershausen, Ritschenhausen, Rohr, Schwallungen, Schwarza, Stepfershausen, Sülzfeld, Untermaßfeld, Utendorf, Vachdorf, Wasungen, and Zella-Mehlis (only Benshausen).

== Members ==
The constituency was held by the Christian Democratic Union from its creation in 1994 until 2024. Its first representative was Adalbert Bauch, who served from 1994 to 1999. From 1999 until 2024, it was represented by Michael Heym. In the 2024 election, Vivien Rottstedt of Alternative for Germany gained the seat.

Election	Member	Party	%
1994	Adalbert Bauch	CDU	43.8
1999	Michael Heym	CDU	50.7
2004	Michael Heym	CDU	44.3
2009	Michael Heym	CDU	34.2
2014	Michael Heym	CDU	39.4
2019	Michael Heym	CDU	26.3
2024	Vivien Rottstedt	AfD	37.4

== Election results ==
=== 2024 election ===
State election (2024): Schmalkalden-Meiningen I
Notes:	Blue background denotes the winner of the electorate vote. Pink background denotes a candidate elected from their party list. Yellow background denotes an electorate win by a list member, or other incumbent. A ✓ or ✗ denotes status of any incumbent, win or lose respectively.						
Party	Candidate	Votes	%	±%	Party votes	%	±%
AfD	Vivien Rottstedt	11,867	37.4	▲14.4	11,200	35.0	▲12.3
CDU	Erik Thürmer	9,141	28.8	▲2.5	6,930	21.7	▼1.5
BSW					5,286	16.5	
SPD	Janine Merz	4,945	15.6	▼2.7	2,407	7.5	▼3.1
Greens					594	1.9	▼2.8
Left	Patrick Beier	3,171	10.1	▼10.1	3,571	11.2	▼18.6
FW	Anne-Kathrin Westhäuser	1,763	5.6		733	2.3	
Pirates	Christian Horn	449	1.4	▼0.1	137	0.4	▼0.2
FDP	Alexander Andree	361	1.1	▼2.0	309	1.0	▼2.7
APT					274	0.9	▼0.2
Values					167	0.5	
Familie					145	0.5	
BD					137	0.4	
ÖDP					64	0.2	▼0.3
MLPD					29	0.1	▼0.2
Informal votes		540			254		
Total valid votes		31,697			31,983		
Turnout		32,237	73.0	▲9.7			
AfD gain from CDU	Majority	2,726	8.6				

=== 2019 election ===
State election (2019): Schmalkalden-Meiningen I
Notes:	Blue background denotes the winner of the electorate vote. Pink background denotes a candidate elected from their party list. Yellow background denotes an electorate win by a list member, or other incumbent. A ✓ or ✗ denotes status of any incumbent, win or lose respectively.						
Party	Candidate	Votes	%	±%	Party votes	%	±%
CDU	✓ Michael Heym	7,480	26.3	▼13.1	6,600	23.2	▼11.9
AfD	Klaus Tumma	6,539	23.0		6,474	22.7	▲13.1
Left	Patrick Beier	5,758	20.2	▼4.4	8,501	29.8	▲4.0
SPD	Janine Merz (Note: Merz entered the Landtag on the SPD list after the resignation of Heike Taubert in June 2020.)	5,195	18.3	▼0.6	3,022	10.6	▼4.5
Greens	Ulrich Töpfer	2,084	7.3	▼1.7	1,349	4.7	▼0.4
FDP	Stefanie Gorzize	889	3.1	▼0.1	1,068	3.7	▲1.8
Pirates	Christian Horn	436	1.5		170	0.6	▼0.3
MLPD	Georg Thümmler	67	0.2		93	0.3	
List-only parties					1,208	4.2	
Informal votes		372			335		
Total valid votes		28,448			28,485		
Turnout		28,820	63.3	▲6.7			
CDU hold	Majority	941	3.3	▼11.5			

=== 2014 election ===
State election (2014): Schmalkalden-Meiningen I
Notes:	Blue background denotes the winner of the electorate vote. Pink background denotes a candidate elected from their party list. Yellow background denotes an electorate win by a list member, or other incumbent. A ✓ or ✗ denotes status of any incumbent, win or lose respectively.						
Party	Candidate	Votes	%	±%	Party votes	%	±%
CDU	✓ Michael Heym	10,420	39.4	▲6.9	9,360	35.1	▲3.7
Left	Maik Nothnagel	6,523	24.6	▼1.9	6,879	25.8	▼3.4
SPD	Rolf Baumann	5,002	18.9	▲2.2	4,020	15.1	▼3.6
AfD					2,560	9.6	
Greens	Ulrich Töpfer	2,373	9.0	▲0.3	1,347	5.1	▼0.8
NPD	Sven Dietsch	1,353	5.1	▲1.3	1,161	4.4	▲0.4
FDP	Jens Graf	800	3.0	▼3.4	503	1.9	▼4.7
List-only parties					822	3.1	
Informal votes		695			514		
Total valid votes		26,471			26,652		
Turnout		27,166	56.6	▲2.9			
CDU hold	Majority	3,897	14.8	▲8.8			

=== 2009 election ===
State election (2009): Schmalkalden-Meiningen I
Notes:	Blue background denotes the winner of the electorate vote. Pink background denotes a candidate elected from their party list. Yellow background denotes an electorate win by a list member, or other incumbent. A ✓ or ✗ denotes status of any incumbent, win or lose respectively.						
Party	Candidate	Votes	%	±%	Party votes	%	±%
CDU	✓ Michael Heym	9,552	34.2	▼10.1	9,076	32.4	▼9.8
Left	Maik Nothnagel	7,243	25.9	▼2.8	7,991	28.5	▲1.3
SPD	Rolf Baumann	4,577	16.4	▲1.0	5,202	18.6	▲3.2
Greens	Ulrich Töpfer	2,447	8.7	▲2.2	1,654	5.9	▲1.8
FDP	Peter Casper	1,742	6.2	▲1.0	1,835	6.6	▲2.9
Free Voters	Jörg Fürst	1,400	5.0		988	3.5	▲1.1
NPD	Michael Ranft	1,009	3.6		1,063	3.8	▲2.6
List-only parties					202	0.7	
Informal votes		486			445		
Total valid votes		27,970			28,011		
Turnout		28,456	53.3	▲1.9			
CDU hold	Majority	2,309	8.3	▼7.3			

=== 2004 election ===
State election (2004): Schmalkalden-Meiningen I
Notes:	Blue background denotes the winner of the electorate vote. Pink background denotes a candidate elected from their party list. Yellow background denotes an electorate win by a list member, or other incumbent. A ✓ or ✗ denotes status of any incumbent, win or lose respectively.						
Party	Candidate	Votes	%	±%	Party votes	%	±%
CDU	✓ Michael Heym	11,909	44.3	▼6.4	11,434	42.2	▼8.9
PDS	Maik Nothnagel	7,714	28.7	▲6.9	7,361	27.2	▲4.6
SPD	Rolf Baumann	4,147	15.4	▼4.3	4,159	15.4	▼2.7
Greens	Ulrich Töpfer	1,747	6.5	▲1.9	1,109	4.1	▲2.1
FDP	Peter Casper	1,388	5.2	▲4.0	1,002	3.7	▲2.9
List-only parties					2,010	7.4	
Informal votes		1,232			1,062		
Total valid votes		26,905			27,075		
Turnout		28,137	51.4	▼7.4			
CDU hold	Majority	4,195	15.6	▼13.3			

=== 1999 election ===
State election (1999): Schmalkalden-Meiningen I
Notes:	Blue background denotes the winner of the electorate vote. Pink background denotes a candidate elected from their party list. Yellow background denotes an electorate win by a list member, or other incumbent. A ✓ or ✗ denotes status of any incumbent, win or lose respectively.						
Party	Candidate	Votes	%	±%	Party votes	%	±%
CDU	Michael Heym	15,964	50.7	▲6.6	16,126	51.1	▲6.7
PDS	Fritz Wilhelm Jackstädt	6,872	21.8	▲4.7	7,130	22.6	▲5.8
SPD	Rolf Baumann	6,194	19.7	▼7.4	5,706	18.1	▼9.7
Greens	Ulrich Töpfer	1,433	4.6	▼2.4	636	2.0	▼3.0
REP	Herbert Schüller	623	2.0		227	0.7	▼0.5
FDP	Bernhard Hille	379	1.2	▼3.4	255	0.8	▼2.1
List-only parties					1,464	4.6	
Informal votes		516			437		
Total valid votes		31,465			31,544		
Turnout		31,981	58.8	▼17.8			
CDU hold	Majority	9,092	28.9	▲11.9			

=== 1994 election ===
State election (1994): Schmalkalden-Meiningen I
Notes:	Blue background denotes the winner of the electorate vote. Pink background denotes a candidate elected from their party list. Yellow background denotes an electorate win by a list member, or other incumbent. A ✓ or ✗ denotes status of any incumbent, win or lose respectively.						
Party	Candidate	Votes	%	±%	Party votes	%	±%
CDU	Adalbert Bauch	16,545	43.8		16,859	44.1	
SPD		10,230	27.1		10,654	27.8	
PDS		6,548	17.3		6,499	17.0	
Greens		2,685	7.1		1,926	5.0	
FDP		1,774	4.7		1,116	2.9	
List-only parties					1,201	3.1	
Informal votes		1,558			1,085		
Total valid votes		37,782			38,255		
Turnout		39,340	76.4				
CDU win new seat	Majority	6,315	16.7				
