= 1990 Brandenburg state election =

State Elections

- 14 October 1990

All 88 seats in the Landtag of Brandenburg 45 seats needed for a majority
- Turnout: 1,273,906 (67.1%)
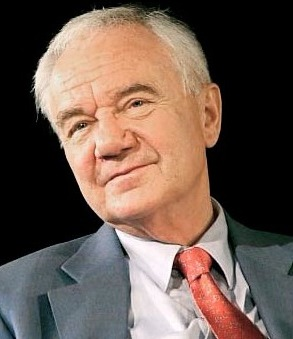

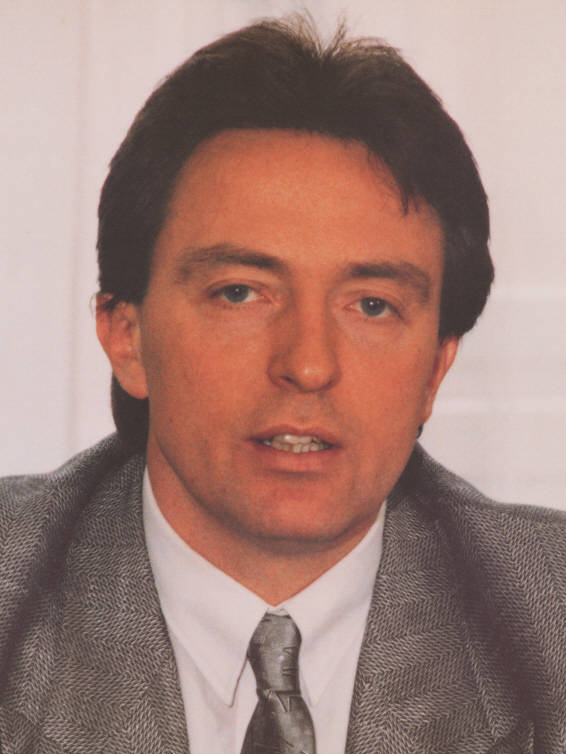
	First party	Second party	Third party
			PDS
Leader	Manfred Stolpe	Peter-Michael Diestel	Heinz Vietze
Party	SPD	CDU	PDS
Leader's seat	Cottbus I	Frankfurt/Oder I	State-wide party list
Seats won	36	27	13
Popular vote	487,134	374,572	170,804
Percentage	38.2%	29.4%	13.4%
	Fourth party	Fifth party
	FDP	B90
Leader	Knut Sandler	Petra Weißflog
Party	FDP	Alliance 90
Leader's seat	State-wide party list	Did not run
Seats won	6	6
Popular vote	84,501	81,725
Percentage	6.6%	6.4%
- Results for the single-member constituencies
Government before election
Jochen Wolf (as Landesbevollmächtigter)
SPD
Government after election
Stolpe I
SPD–FDP–Alliance 90

The 1990 Brandenburg state election was held on 14 October 1990 to elect the members of the first Landtag of Brandenburg. It was the first election held in Brandenburg since the reunification of Germany, which took place on 3 October. The Social Democratic Party (SPD) led by Manfred Stolpe emerged as the largest party with 38.2% of the vote, followed by the Christian Democratic Union (CDU) with 29.6%. The SPD subsequently formed Germany's first traffic light coalition with the Free Democratic Party (FDP) and Alliance 90, and Stolpe became Brandenburg's first post-reunification Minister-President.

== Parties ==
The table below lists parties which won seats in the election.

Name		Ideology	Leader(s)
SPD	Social Democratic Party of Germany; Sozialdemokratische Partei Deutschlands	Social democracy	Manfred Stolpe
CDU	Christian Democratic Union of Germany; Christlich Demokratische Union Deutschlands	Christian democracy	Peter-Michael Diestel
PDS	Party of Democratic Socialism; Partei des Demokratischen Sozialismus	Democratic socialism	
B90	Alliance 90; Bündnis 90	Green politics	
FDP	Free Democratic Party; Freie Demokratische Partei	Classical liberalism	

== Election result ==
Summary of the 14 October 1990 election results for the Landtag of Brandenburg
Party	Votes	%	Seats	Seats %
Social Democratic Party (SPD)	487,134	38.2	36	40.9
Christian Democratic Union (CDU)	374,572	29.4	27	30.7
Party of Democratic Socialism (PDS)	170,804	13.4	13	14.8
Free Democratic Party (FDP)	84,501	6.6	6	6.8
Alliance 90 (B90)	81,725	6.4	6	6.8
The Greens (Grüne)	36,238	2.8	0	0
The Republicans (REP)	14,631	1.1	0	0
Others	24,301	1.9	0	0
Total	1,273,906	100.0	88	
Voter turnout		67.1		

Popular Vote
SPD	38.24%
CDU	29.40%
PDS	13.41%
FDP	6.63%
B90	6.42%
GRÜNE	2.84%
Other	3.06%

Landtag seats
SPD	40.91%
CDU	30.68%
PDS	14.77%
FDP	6.82%
B90	6.82%

== Sources ==
- Amtliches Endergebnis der Landtagswahl in Brandenburg 1990
