= Jochen Wolf =

German politician (1941–2022)

- Wolf in 1991

Landesbevollmächtigter of Brandenburg
- In office 3 October 1990 – 1 November 1990
- Appointed by: Lothar de Maizière
- Preceded by: Position established
- Succeeded by: Manfred Stolpe (as Minister-President of Brandenburg)

Minister for Urban Development, Housing and Transportation of Brandenburg
- In office 1 November 1990 – 31 August 1993
- Minister-President: Manfred Stolpe
- Preceded by: Office established
- Succeeded by: Hartmut Meyer

Regierungsbevollmächtigter of Potsdam
- In office 11 June 1990 – 3 October 1990
- Appointed by: Lothar de Maizière
- Preceded by: Herbert Tzschoppe (as Chairman of the District Council)
- Succeeded by: Position abolished

Member of the Landtag of Brandenburg for Potsdam II
- In office 26 October 1990 – 11 October 1994
- Preceded by: Constituency established
- Succeeded by: Angelika Thiel-Vigh

Personal details
- Born: 26 August 1941 Kleinolbersdorf, Saxony, Germany
- Died: 2 February 2022 (aged 80) Brandenburg an der Havel, Germany
- Party: SPD; Independent
- Other political affiliations: Social Democratic Party (1990–1994); Social Democratic Party (GDR) (1989–1990)
- Education: Hochschule für Verkehrswesen

Jochen Wolf (26 August 1941 – 2 February 2022) was a German politician who served as the first and only Landesbevollmächtigter of Brandenburg in 1990. A member of the Social Democratic Party of Germany, he also served in the Landtag of Brandenburg from 1990 to 1994.

== Early life ==
After completing school, Wolf underwent an apprenticeship as a kaufmann for large and foreign trade, and completed his mandatory service in the National People's Army from 1960 to 1961. Later, he worked as a truck driver. After attaining his Abitur in 1969, he studied at the Hochschule für Verkehrswesen in Dresden, attaining a diploma in economic engineering. Afterwards, he worked at Deutrans and rose to head of a department in Potsdam.

== Political career ==
In October 1989, during the Peaceful Revolution, he, among others, founded the Social Democratic Party in the GDR in Brandenburg and was elected the first chairman of the SPD district of Potsdam and later to the party executive board in Brandenburg. From June 1990 onward, he was the Regierungsbevollmächtigter (Government Commissioner) for the Bezirk Potsdam, the Landessprecher (State Spokesperson) for the state of Brandenburg that was then in formation, and afterwards, from 3 October 1990, as the Landesbevollmächtigter (State Commissioner), until a proper minister president could be elected.

During the first free state elections in Brandenburg in 1990, he was elected into the Landtag in the 23rd electoral district (Potsdam II). Under minister president Manfred Stolpe, Wolf became Minister of Urban Development, Housing and Transportation. After a real estate scandal, he resigned in August 1993. The real estate agent Axel Hilpert, who formerly worked in the so-called "Antiquity Trade Pirna", part of the Kommerzielle Koordinierung of the East German government, waived Wolf's commission in exchange for him recommending a conservation area to be converted into building land. In December 1999, Wolf was fined 8,400 Deutsche Mark for corruption. During his stint in the Landtag, he was a member of the Committee for Economic Affairs, Small and Medium Businesses and Technology from 1993 to 1994. He left the SPD in 1994, but remained in the Landtag until the end of his term. Wolf attained a position as a special representative for Eastern Europe in the Brandenburg Ministry of Economic Affairs through a lawsuit in 1995, which he held until 1997.

== Personal life ==
Wolf was married four times and had four children. He was married to his first wife Kristina from 1961 to 1967. After their divorce, he married his second wife Erika that same year, who later committed suicide. His third marriage with a woman named Gabriele in 1975 only lasted eight weeks. In 1979, he married his fourth wife Ursula. Since his fourth wife did not want to settle for divorce in 1998, Wolf's 25-year old Ukrainian girlfriend threatened her with a firearm to agree to the dissolution. When this failed, the Ukrainian woman shot herself. Wolf sought revenge, attempting to hire a hitman. He was arrested on 27 July 2001 and sentenced to five years in prison on 27 February 2002 for incitement to commit murder. After serving two-thirds of his sentence, he was released on probation in 2004. For a brief time, he lived in Groß Glienicke.

After a mistaken report on his death, a speaker of the city of Brandenburg an der Havel confirmed in March 2017 that he was still alive and registered as living in the city. Three years earlier, the tabloid Bild had found the supposedly dead politician.

Jochen Wolf was found dead at the age of 80 on 2 February 2022 in his apartment in Brandenburg an der Havel.
