= Weimar I – Weimarer Land II =

Electoral constituency in Thuringia, Germany

Weimar I – Weimarer Land II is an electoral constituency (German: Wahlkreis) represented in the Landtag of Thuringia. It elects one member via first-past-the-post voting. Under the current constituency numbering system, it is designated as constituency 31. It covers the eastern part of Weimarer Land and small parts of the city of Weimar.

Weimar I – Weimarer Land II was created for the 1994 state election. It was originally named Weimar-Land II, but was renamed to Weimarer Land II after the 1994 election. It took its current name before the 2014 election after obtaining a small part of the city of Weimar. Since 2024, it has been represented by Peter Gerhardt of Alternative for Germany (AfD).

== Geography ==
As of the 2019 state election, Weimar I – Weimarer Land II covers the eastern part of Weimarer Land and small parts of the city of Weimar, specifically the municipalities of Apolda, Bad Sulza, Eberstedt, Großheringen, Ilmtal-Weinstraße (excluding Leutenthal und Rohrbach), Niedertrebra, Obertrebra, Rannstedt, Saaleplatte, and Schmiedehausen (from Weimarer Land), and the city districts (Ortsteile) of Schöndorf, Süßenborn, and Tiefurt/Dürrenbacher Hütte (from Weimar).

== Members ==
The constituency was held by the Christian Democratic Union from its creation in 1994 until 2024. Its first representative was Christine Lieberknecht, who served from 1994 to 2019, followed by Thomas Gottweis until 2024. Peter Gerhardt of Alternative for Germany won the seat in 2024.

Election	Member	Party	%
1994	Christine Lieberknecht	CDU	46.8
1999	Christine Lieberknecht	CDU	55.2
2004	Christine Lieberknecht	CDU	53.3
2009	Christine Lieberknecht	CDU	37.2
2014	Christine Lieberknecht	CDU	45.0
2019	Thomas Gottweis	CDU	29.4
2024	Peter Gerhardt	AfD	38.4

== Election results ==
=== 2024 election ===
State election (2024): Weimar I/Weimarer Land II
Notes:	Blue background denotes the winner of the electorate vote. Pink background denotes a candidate elected from their party list. Yellow background denotes an electorate win by a list member, or other incumbent. A ✓ or ✗ denotes status of any incumbent, win or lose respectively.						
Party	Candidate	Votes	%	±%	Party votes	%	±%
AfD	Peter Gerhardt	9,437	38.3	▲17.5	8,785	35.4	▲11.6
CDU	✗ Thomas Gottweiss	9,184	37.3	▲7.9	5,924	23.9	▼6.5
BSW					3,971	16.0	
Left	Michael Eberhardt	2,536	10.3	▼5.8	2,966	12.0	▼13.3
SPD	Steven Büchner	1,123	4.6	▼0.8	1,192	4.8	▼1.7
FW	Ute Sauer	1,066	4.3	▲2.5	388	1.6	
Greens	Max Reschke	895	3.6	▼4.3	533	2.1	▼1.9
FDP	Patrick Martin	390	1.6	▼1.9	332	1.3	▼3.7
APT					269	1.1	▼0.1
Familie					131	0.5	
BD					116	0.5	
Values					94	0.4	
Pirates					51	0.2	▼0.1
ÖDP					29	0.1	▼0.1
MLPD					19	0.1	▼0.1
Informal votes		359			190		
Total valid votes		24,631			24,800		
Turnout		24,990	73.5	▲8.5			
AfD gain from CDU	Majority	253	1.0				

=== 2019 election ===
State election (2019): Weimar I – Weimarer Land II
Notes:	Blue background denotes the winner of the electorate vote. Pink background denotes a candidate elected from their party list. Yellow background denotes an electorate win by a list member, or other incumbent. A ✓ or ✗ denotes status of any incumbent, win or lose respectively.						
Party	Candidate	Votes	%	±%	Party votes	%	±%
CDU	Thomas Gottweis	6,578	29.4	▼15.6	6,812	30.4	▼9.9
AfD	Ulrich Kühn	4,648	20.8		5,330	23.8	▲13.8
Left	Sabine Berninger	3,600	16.1	▼3.7	5,682	25.3	▲1.8
Independent	Hans-Helmut Münchberg	2,901	13.0				
Greens	Max Reschke	1,764	7.9	▲3.8	898	4.0	▼0.8
SPD	Jörg Rietschel	1,654	7.4	▼10.1	1,449	6.5	▼4.8
FDP	Lukas Rost	787	3.5	▲0.7	1,129	5.0	▲2.5
Free Voters	Andreas Weise	399	1.8	▼4.6			
MLPD	Wolfgang Serway	20	0.1		38	0.2	
List-only parties					1,092	4.9	
Informal votes		429			350		
Total valid votes		22,351			22,430		
Turnout		22,780	65.0	▲10.3			
CDU hold	Majority	1,930	8.6	▼16.6			

=== 2014 election ===
State election (2014): Weimar I – Weimarer Land II
Notes:	Blue background denotes the winner of the electorate vote. Pink background denotes a candidate elected from their party list. Yellow background denotes an electorate win by a list member, or other incumbent. A ✓ or ✗ denotes status of any incumbent, win or lose respectively.						
Party	Candidate	Votes	%	±%	Party votes	%	±%
CDU	✓ Christine Lieberknecht	9,661	45.0	▲8.8	8,684	40.3	▲7.7
Left	Ercan Ayboga	4,250	19.8	▼1.7	5,056	23.5	0.0
SPD	Dirk Schütze	3,747	17.5	▼5.9	2,435	11.3	▼8.2
AfD					2,159	10.0	
Free Voters	Andreas Weise	1,365	6.4		581	2.7	▼2.5
NPD	Reinhold Leidenfrost	961	4.5	▼0.2	720	3.3	▼1.1
Greens	Christian Ranft	874	4.1	▼2.0	1,028	4.8	▼0.9
FDP	Guido von Pölnitz	604	2.8	▼5.4	538	2.5	▼5.6
List-only parties					358	1.7	
Informal votes		440			343		
Total valid votes		21,462			21,559		
Turnout		21,902	54.7	▲0.1			
CDU hold	Majority	5,411	25.2	▲11.9			

=== 2009 election ===
State election (2009): Weimarer Land II
Notes:	Blue background denotes the winner of the electorate vote. Pink background denotes a candidate elected from their party list. Yellow background denotes an electorate win by a list member, or other incumbent. A ✓ or ✗ denotes status of any incumbent, win or lose respectively.						
Party	Candidate	Votes	%	±%	Party votes	%	±%
CDU	✓ Christine Lieberknecht	7,638	37.2	▼16.1	6,832	33.3	▼13.8
SPD	Dirk Schütze	4,897	23.9	▲8.5	4,011	19.5	▲5.7
Left	Sandro Witt	4,191	20.4	▼3.6	4,711	22.9	▲0.5
FDP	Gunnar Wagenknecht	1,673	8.2		1,678	8.2	▲4.0
Greens	Jens Hackbarth	1,188	5.8	▲1.4	1,143	5.6	▲2.0
NPD	Martin Rühlemann	929	4.5		886	4.3	▲2.9
List-only parties					1,275	6.2	
Informal votes		413			393		
Total valid votes		20,516			20,536		
Turnout		20,929	55.6	▲1.6			
CDU hold	Majority	2,741	13.3	▼16.0			

=== 2004 election ===
State election (2004): Weimarer Land II
Notes:	Blue background denotes the winner of the electorate vote. Pink background denotes a candidate elected from their party list. Yellow background denotes an electorate win by a list member, or other incumbent. A ✓ or ✗ denotes status of any incumbent, win or lose respectively.						
Party	Candidate	Votes	%	±%	Party votes	%	±%
CDU	✓ Christine Lieberknecht	10,561	53.3	▼1.9	9,456	47.1	▼9.8
PDS	Jan Tampe	4,756	24.0	▲6.3	4,494	22.4	▲5.9
SPD	Frank Weber	3,059	15.4	▼5.1	2,778	13.8	▼3.9
Greens	Diana Langbein	878	4.4	▲2.6	716	3.6	▲2.2
Independent	Constanze Kubitz	557	2.8				
List-only parties					2,647	13.2	
Informal votes		1,158			878		
Total valid votes		19,811			20,091		
Turnout		20,969	54.0	▼7.1			
CDU hold	Majority	5,805	29.3	▼5.4			

=== 1999 election ===
State election (1999): Weimarer Land II
Notes:	Blue background denotes the winner of the electorate vote. Pink background denotes a candidate elected from their party list. Yellow background denotes an electorate win by a list member, or other incumbent. A ✓ or ✗ denotes status of any incumbent, win or lose respectively.						
Party	Candidate	Votes	%	±%	Party votes	%	±%
CDU	✓ Christine Lieberknecht	12,921	55.2	▲8.4	13,368	56.9	▲10.1
SPD	Kurt Weyh	4,796	20.5	▼10.4	4,171	17.7	▼10.3
PDS	Sigrun Heimbürge	4,152	17.7	▲5.3	3,890	16.5	▲3.3
FDP	Andreas Kniepurt	588	2.5	▼2.0	376	1.6	▼3.0
REP	Hans Siegert	532	2.3		147	0.6	▼0.7
Greens	Carsten Meyer	414	1.8	▼3.6	323	1.4	▼2.5
List-only parties					1,236	5.3	
Informal votes		390			282		
Total valid votes		23,403			23,511		
Turnout		23,793	61.1	▼13.3			
CDU hold	Majority	8,125	34.7	▲18.8			

=== 1994 election ===
State election (1994): Weimar-Land II
Notes:	Blue background denotes the winner of the electorate vote. Pink background denotes a candidate elected from their party list. Yellow background denotes an electorate win by a list member, or other incumbent. A ✓ or ✗ denotes status of any incumbent, win or lose respectively.						
Party	Candidate	Votes	%	±%	Party votes	%	±%
CDU	Christine Lieberknecht	12,958	46.8		12,969	46.8	
SPD		8,570	30.9		7,767	28.0	
PDS		3,438	12.4		3,659	13.2	
Greens		1,494	5.4		1,069	3.9	
FDP		1,243	4.5		1,263	4.6	
List-only parties					996	3.6	
Informal votes		650			630		
Total valid votes		27,703			27,723		
Turnout		28,353	74.3				
CDU win new seat	Majority	4,388	15.9				
