= Vivien Rottstedt =

German politician (born 1993)

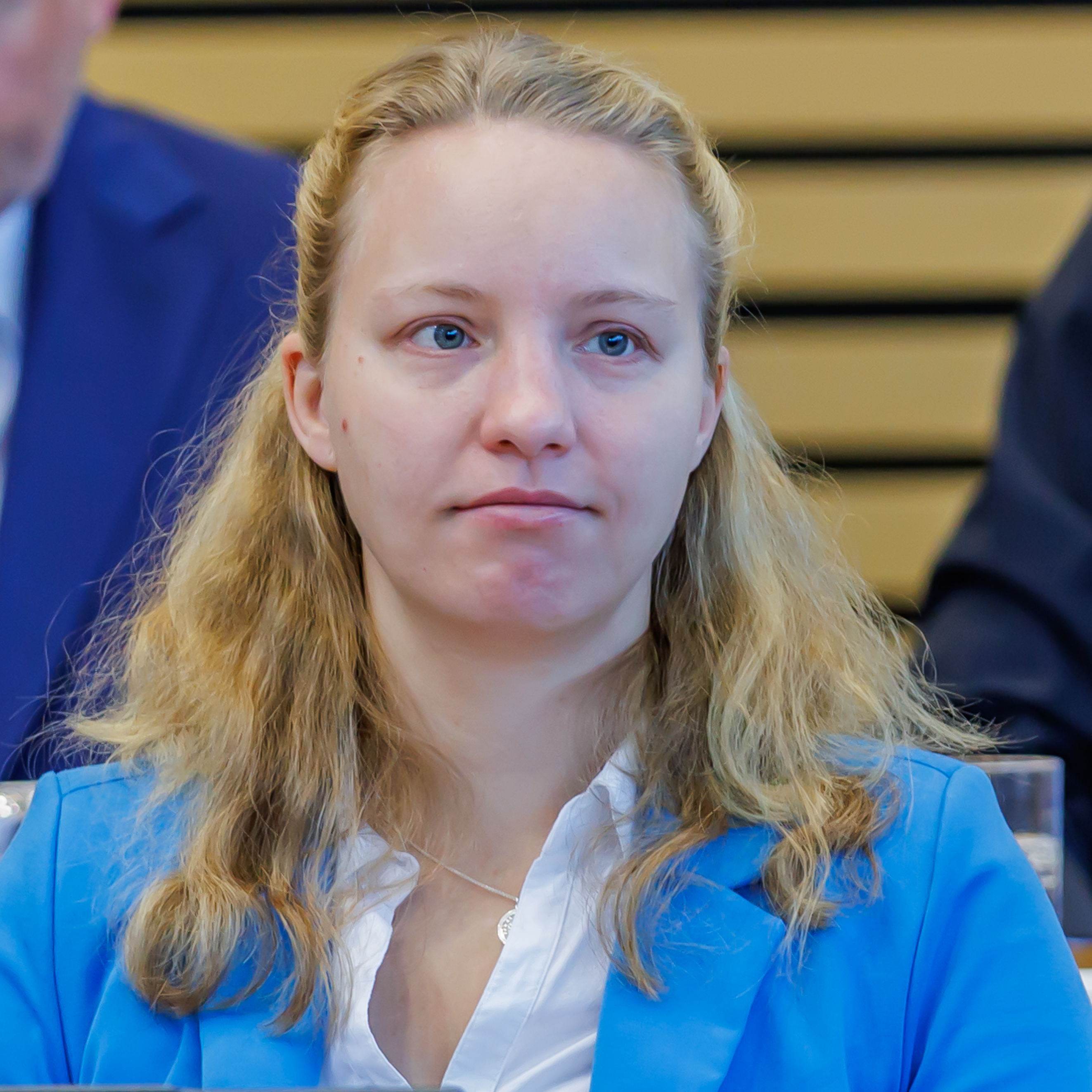
- Rottstedt in 2024

Member of the Landtag of Thuringia
- Incumbent
- Assumed office 26 September 2024
- Preceded by: Michael Heym
- Constituency: Schmalkalden-Meiningen I

Personal details
- Born: 1993 (age 32–33) Erfurt
- Party: Alternative for Germany

Vivien Rottstedt (born 1993 in Erfurt) is a German politician serving as a member of the Landtag of Thuringia since 2024. She has been a city councillor of Erfurt since 2024.
