= Tilo Kummer =

German politician

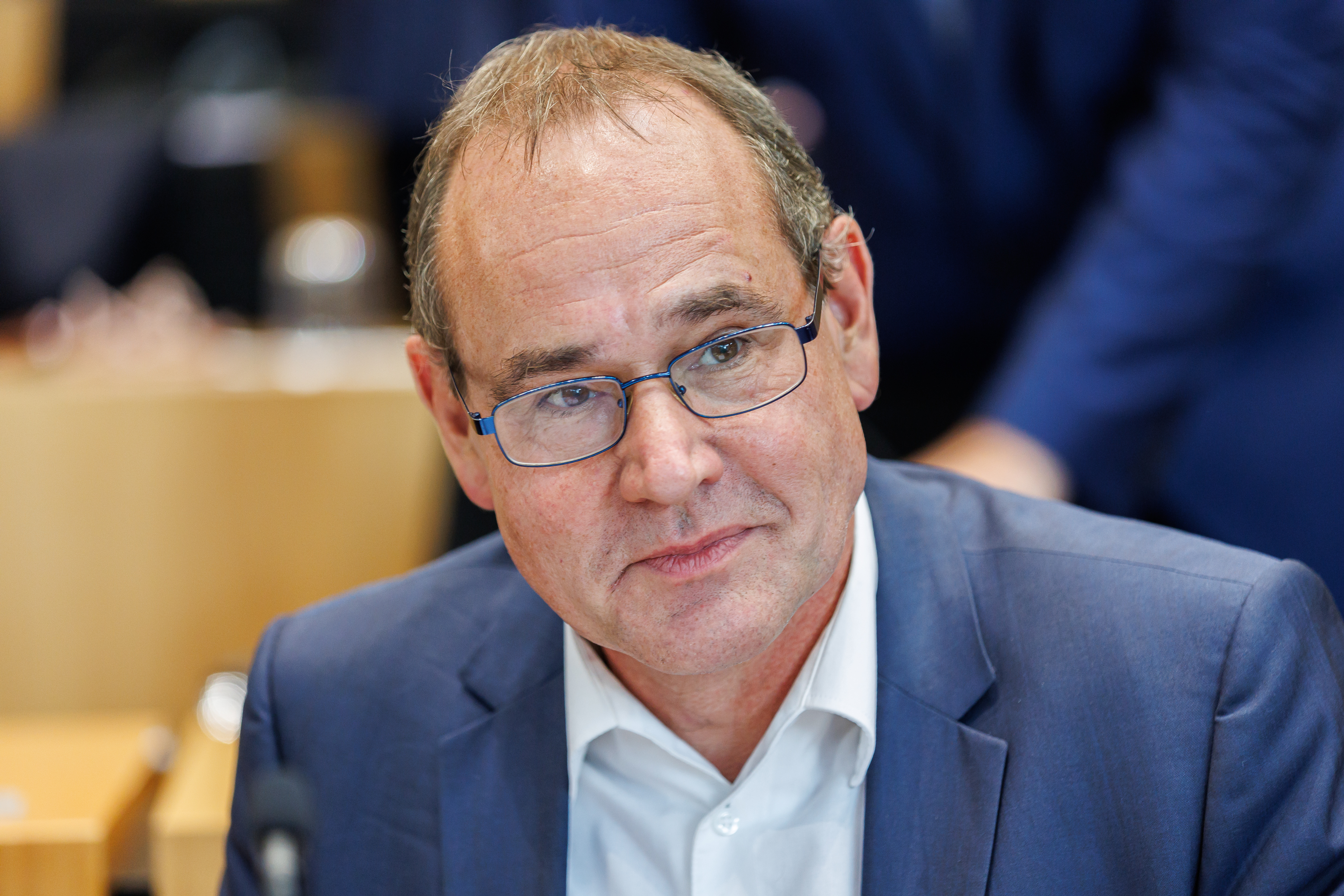
- Kummer in 2024

Minister for the Environment, Energy, Nature Conservation and Forestry of Thuringia
- Incumbent
- Assumed office 2024

Mayor of Hildburghausen
- In office 2020–2023

Member of the Landtag of Thuringia
- Incumbent
- Assumed office 1 September 2024 (1999-2019)

Personal details
- Born: 29 June 1968 (age 58) Dessau, East Germany
- Party: BSW (since 2024)
- Other political affiliations: Die Linke (2007-2024); PDS (until 2007)
- Education: Humboldt University of Berlin

Tilo Kummer (born 29 June 1968) is a German politician from the Sahra Wagenknecht Alliance (BSW), previously a member of Die Linke. Since 2024 he has been Thuringia's Minister for the Environment, Energy, Nature Conservation and Forestry in the Voigt Cabinet. From 2020 until his deselection in 2023 he was mayor of the town of Hildburghausen. Since 2024 he has again been a member of the Landtag of Thuringia, of which he was already a member from 1999 to 2019.

== Life ==
After graduating from high school in 1987 at the Philanthropinum secondary school in Dessau, Tilo Kummer served as a temporary non-commissioned officer in the Berlin Felix Dzerzhinsky Guards Regiment, which belonged to the Ministry for State Security (MfS) and whose members had to take a special oath to the MfS. According to a report in the Thüringische Landeszeitung, Kummer "comes from a home in which there was no distance to the SED state" and had not applied for service in the guard regiment.

In 1990 he was a production worker at Halle Fisch GmbH. Until 1995 he studied fish farming and water management at the Humboldt University of Berlin, graduating with a degree in fisheries engineering. Kummer worked as a geriatric nurse as part of his long-term care insurance from 1995 to 1999. From 1997 to 2001 he was also the owner of a pet shop. Since 2014 he has been running a part-time business in the agricultural industry.

== Political career ==
From 1999 to 2019 he was a member of the Landtag of Thuringia. He was first elected in the 1999 Thuringian state election for the Party of Democratic Socialism. He won the direct mandate in the Hildburghausen I constituency in 2009 and was elected via the state list in 2014. His areas of expertise were environmental and agricultural policy . He was chairman of the Committee on Agriculture, Forestry, Environment and Nature Conservation in the Thuringian State Parliament and a member of the administrative board of the Thuringian Forestry Institute.

He is a member of the district council of the Hildburghausen district and was a member of the city council of Hildburghausen until his election as mayor. Since 2015 he has been honorary chairman of the Thuringian Forest Nature Park eV. As mayor of the city of Hildburghausen, he was chairman of the local water and sewage association. Tilo Kummer has been on the board of the Thuringian Forest Regional Association since 2021 and a board member of the LEADER Hildburghausen-Sonneberg regional working group since 2022.

In March 2020, Kummer was elected mayor of Hildburghausen in the first round of voting with 51.8% of the vote. In December 2022, the Hildburghausen city council decided, with the necessary two-thirds majority, to hold a referendum to vote Kummer out of office. According to a preliminary result, 2853 people voted for Kummer's de-election and 1390 against, with the necessary quorum of participation (30% of those eligible to vote) being narrowly reached. Kummer was thus voted out of office as mayor. Kummer was primarily accused of poor communication and a failed leadership style. Other controversial issues included a swimming pool and problems in a kindergarten and with the fire department.

In January 2024, he left the Left Party and became a member of the Alliance Sahra Wagenknecht - Reason and Justice (BSW) party. On 15 March 2024, Kummer was elected managing director of the state association; BSW Thuringia. He stood for his new party in the 2024 Thuringian state election and re-entered the Landtag of Thuringia via the state list . He was initially parliamentary manager of the BSW parliamentary group in the state parliament until December 2024

On December 13, 2024, Kummer was appointed Thuringia's Minister for the Environment, Energy, Nature Conservation and Forestry in the Voigt Cabinet.
