= Nadine Hoffmann =

German politician (born 1979)

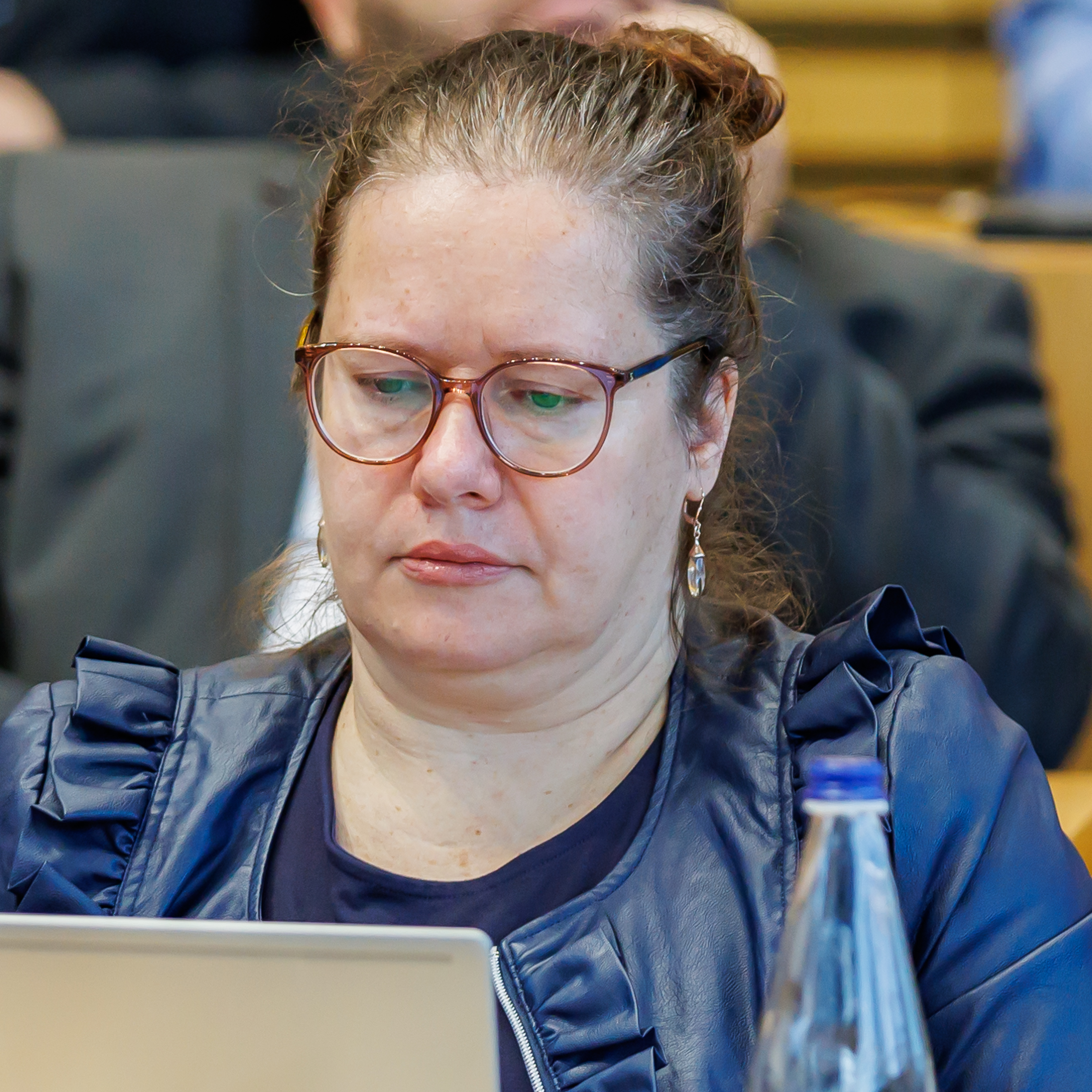
- Hoffmann in 2024

Member of the Landtag of Thuringia
- Incumbent
- Assumed office 26 November 2019
- Preceded by: Kristin Floßmann
- Constituency: Hildburghausen I – Schmalkalden-Meiningen III

Personal details
- Born: 1979 (age 46–47)
- Party: Alternative for Germany (since 2013)

Nadine Hoffmann (born 1979) is a German politician serving as a member of the Landtag of Thuringia since 2019. She is the group leader of the Alternative for Germany in the Kreistag of Hildburghausen.
