= Peter Gerhardt (politician) =

German politician (born 1992)

Member of the Landtag of Thuringia
- Incumbent
- Assumed office 26 September 2024
- Preceded by: Thomas Gottweis
- Constituency: Weimar I – Weimarer Land II

Personal details
- Born: 1992 (age 33–34)
- Party: Alternative for Germany

Peter Gerhardt (born 1992) is a German politician serving as a member of the Landtag of Thuringia since 2024. From 2023 to 2024, he served as assistant to Stefan Marzischewski-Drewes.
