= Manfred Stolpe =

German politician (1936–2019)

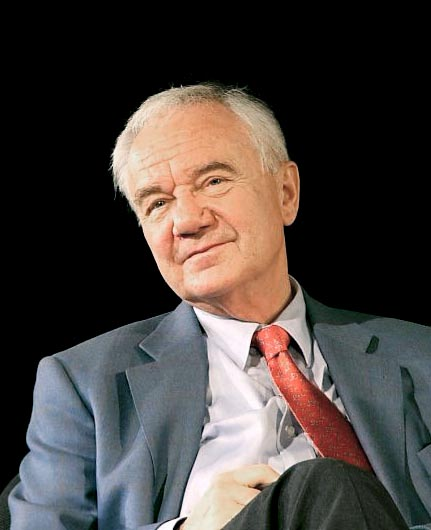
- Stolpe in 2005

Minister for Transport, Building and Housing
- In office 22 October 2002 – 22 November 2005
- Chancellor: Gerhard Schröder
- Preceded by: Kurt Bodewig
- Succeeded by: Wolfgang Tiefensee (Transport, Building and Urban Development)

Minister-President of Brandenburg
- In office 1 November 1990 – 26 June 2002
- Deputy: Alwin Ziel; Jörg Schönbohm
- Preceded by: Jochen Wolf (as Landesbevollmächtigter)
- Succeeded by: Matthias Platzeck

Member of the Landtag of Brandenburg for Cottbus
- In office 11 October 1994 – 11 November 2002
- Preceded by: Dyrck Schneidenbach
- Succeeded by: Britta Stark
- Constituency: Cottbus II
- In office 26 October 1990 – 11 October 1994
- Preceded by: Constituency established
- Succeeded by: Heidemarie Konzack
- Constituency: Cottbus I

Personal details
- Born: 16 May 1936 Stettin, Province of Pomerania, Free State of Prussia, Nazi Germany (now Szczecin, Poland)
- Died: 29 December 2019 (aged 83) Potsdam, Brandenburg, Germany
- Cause of death: Colorectal cancer
- Resting place: Bornstedt Cemetery, Potsdam
- Party: Social Democratic Party (1990–2019)
- Spouse: Ingrid Stolpe (m. 1961; div. 2003)
- Children: 1
- Education: University of Jena; Free University of Berlin
- Occupation: Politician; Lawyer; Stasi Agent; Canonist

Manfred Stolpe (16 May 1936 – 29 December 2019) was a German canonist, theologian and politician who served as Federal Minister of Transport, Building and Urban Affairs of Germany from 2002 until 2005. Before, he was Ministerpräsident of the state Brandenburg from 1990 until 2002. Stolpe was, after the state elections following German reunification, the only Social Democratic Minister-President of a state of former East Germany. Stolpe is considered to be the architect of modern Brandenburg and left office with a 74% approval rating. He is credited with forging a new identity for the state, among other things, popularizing the Brandenburglied, though controversy surrounding several failed projects and his work for the Stasi came up during his tenure. To date, Brandenburg has only had Social Democratic Minister-Presidents.

== Biography ==
=== Early life and education ===
Stolpe was born in Stettin (today Szczecin in Poland). He and his family fled to Greifswald in 1945 to escape the advancing Soviet Red Army. He studied law at the University of Jena in German Democratic Republic (GDR) (1955–1959). In 1959 he became active in the Protestant Church in Berlin-Brandenburg, then comprising East Berlin and West Berlin and the region of Brandenburg, and was also a guest student at the Free University of Berlin from 1959 until 1961.

=== GDR career ===
Between 1962 and 1969 he was Head of the Secretariat of the Conference of Governing Bodies of the Evangelical Churches in the GDR. After this he became Head of the Secretariat of the Federation of Evangelical Churches (GDR), a post which he held until 1981. During this time he was appointed to the World Council of Churches "Commission on International Relations".

In 1982 Stolpe became Consistorial President of the Eastern Region of the then divided Evangelical Church in Berlin-Brandenburg and, as such, a member of the Conference of Governing Bodies of the Evangelical Churches in the GDR; at the same time he was one of the two deputy chairmen of the Federation of Evangelical Churches. He gave up these positions in 1990 and 1989 respectively. He was a Stasi informer for 20 years while in the church.

=== Political career after reunification ===
In July 1990 he joined the Social Democratic Party of Germany (SPD) and on 14 October of that year he was elected to the Brandenburg Landtag for a seat in Cottbus. Shortly afterwards, on 1 November 1990, he was elected Ministerpräsident of the State of Brandenburg. He was re-elected twice, gaining an absolute majority of seats in the 1994 Brandenburg state election, even though he had been accused of collaborating with the Stasi, chiefly by then-Federal Commissioner for the Stasi Records Joachim Gauck. He held the position until his resignation on 26 June 2002. During his time in office, he spearheaded an unsuccessful attempt to unify Brandenburg and Berlin in 1996, though the states cooperate on many matters to this day. From May 1991 to 26 June 2002 he was a Member of the SPD National Executive.

From 22 October 2002 to November 2005, he was Federal Minister of Transport, Building and Urban Affairs.

== Personal ==
He married Ingrid Stolpe (born 1938), a physician who practised in Potsdam from 1965–2003, in 1961. The couple have a daughter. They both received treatment for colon cancer and breast cancer respectively, a subject on which they wrote a book and spoke on television.

== Death ==
Stolpe died on 29 December 2019 from complications of his aforementioned colon cancer and was buried at Bornstedter Friedhof opposite the Bornstedt Crown Estate in Potsdam.

== Awards ==
Stolpe received honorary Doctorates in Theology from the University of Greifswald (November 1989), from the University of Zurich (April 1991) and in Economics from the University of Szczecin (June 1996).
