= Stephan Steinbrück =

German politician (born 1975)

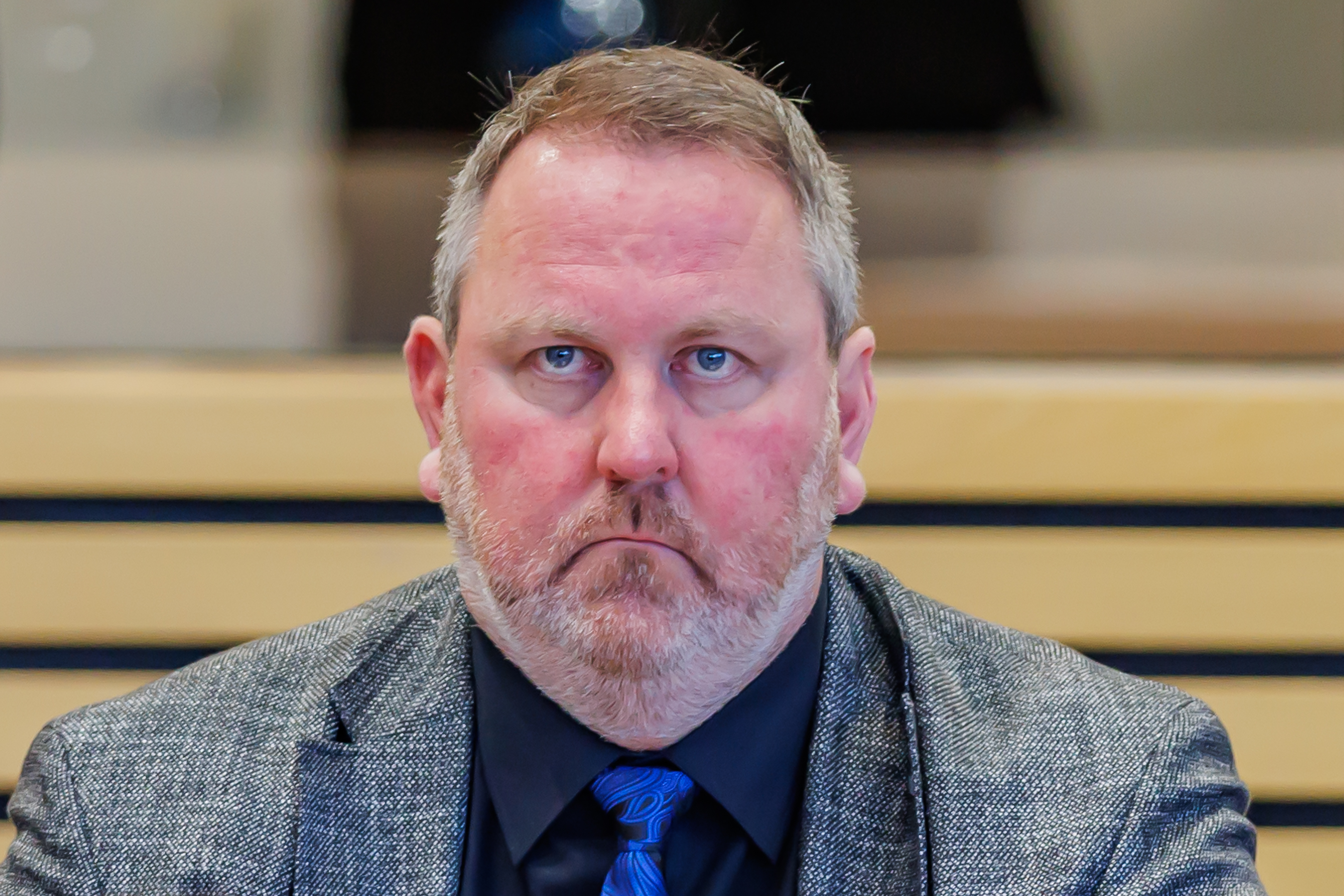
- Steinbrück in 2024

Member of the Landtag of Thuringia
- Incumbent
- Assumed office 26 September 2024
- Preceded by: Matthias Hey
- Constituency: Gotha II

Personal details
- Born: 22 May 1975 (age 50) Gotha
- Party: Alternative for Germany

Stephan Steinbrück (born 22 May 1975 in Gotha) is a German politician serving as a member of the Landtag of Thuringia since 2024. He is the spokesperson of the Alternative for Germany in Gotha.
