= Friedrich Dickel =

East German politician (1913–1993)

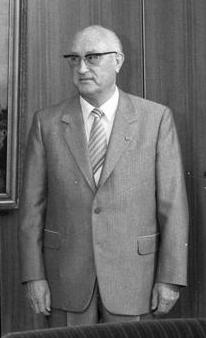
- Dickel in 1983

Minister of the Interior Head of the Volkspolizei
- In office 15 November 1963 – 17 November 1989
- Chairman of the Council of Ministers: Willi Stoph; Horst Sindermann; Willi Stoph
- Deputy: Willi Seifert; Rudolf Riss; Lothar Ahrendt
- Preceded by: Karl Maron
- Succeeded by: Lothar Ahrendt

Member of the Volkskammer for Auerbach, Klingenthal, Oelsnitz, Plauen-Stadt, Plauen-Land
- In office 2 July 1967 – 16 November 1989
- Preceded by: multi-member district
- Succeeded by: Hans-Ludwig Erlenbeck

Personal details
- Born: 9 December 1913 Vohwinkel, Rhine Province, Kingdom of Prussia, German Empire
- Died: 23 October 1993 (aged 79) Berlin, Germany
- Party: Socialist Unity Party (1946–1989)
- Other political affiliations: Communist Party of Germany (1931–1946)
- Occupation: Politician; Civil Servant; Soldier; Founder
- Central institution membership: 1967–1989: Full member, Central Committee; Other offices held: 1963–1989: Member, National Defence Council

Friedrich Dickel (9 December 1913 – 23 October 1993) was a German politician, veteran of the International Brigades in the Spanish Civil War and law enforcement administrator who served as the interior minister for nearly twenty-six years, the longest-serving individual to hold that post in East Germany.

== Early life ==
Dickel was born on 9 December 1913 in Vohwinkel, later part of Wuppertal, in the Prussian Rhine Province of the German Empire.

== Career ==
Dickel joined the Communist Party of Germany in 1931. He fought in the international brigades in the civil war of Spain together with others, including future Stasi chief Erich Mielke. Dickel commanded a platoon unit in the civil war in Spain.

During the Nazi rule in Germany, he settled in the Soviet Union where he taught at the Soviet General Staff Academy. He returned to East Germany in 1946 and served as the commander of the Officers’ School for Political Work in East Berlin from 1950. He was promoted to the rank of major general in 1956. Next year he was named as the deputy national defense minister.

Dickel became a member of the Socialist Unity Party of Germany (SED) and of its central committee. His tenure in the SED central committee was between 1967 and 1989. He also served as a police chief in East Berlin.

Dickel was appointed interior minister on 14 November 1963, replacing Karl Maron in the post. He also led the Volkspolizei during his tenure. During Dickel's time, majority of the East German paramilitary troops organized for territorial defense were also under the interior ministry's control. One of the policies he introduced include the regulation and control of immigration and returnees. Dickel's term ended on 18 November 1989 when he was dismissed as a result of the atmosphere of change and reform in the country which began leading up to German reunification. He was succeeded by Lothar Ahrendt as interior minister. He was a military officer with the rank of colonel general, before being promoted to army general in 1984. In December 1989 Dickel retired from politics.

Dickel was also a member of the Volkskammer for Auerbach, Klingenthal, Oelsnitz, Plauen-Stadt, Plauen-Land between 2 July 1967 and 5 April 1990.

== Death ==
After a long illness Dickel died in Berlin on 23 October 1993. He was 79.

=== Awards ===
Dickel was the recipient of the Order of Karl Marx which was awarded to him in June 1985 on the occasion of the 40th anniversary of the German People's Police.
