= Karl Maron =

East German politician (1903–1975)

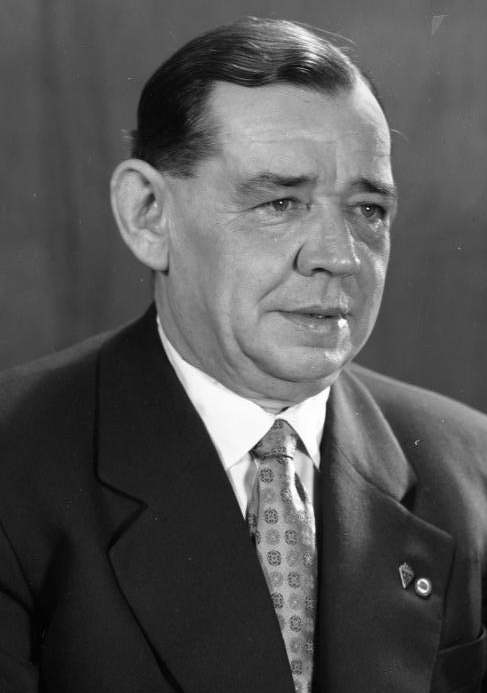

Minister of the Interior of the German Democratic Republic
- In office 1 July 1955 – 14 November 1963
- Preceded by: Willi Stoph
- Succeeded by: Friedrich Dickel

Member of the Volkskammer
- In office 1958–1967

Personal details
- Born: 27 April 1903 Berlin, Kingdom of Prussia, German Empire
- Died: 2 February 1975 (aged 71) East Berlin, German Democratic Republic
- Resting place: Zentralfriedhof Friedrichsfelde, Berlin
- Party: Socialist Unity Party of Germany (1946-); Communist Party of Germany (1926-1946)

Karl Maron (1903–1975) was a German politician, who served as the interior minister of East Germany. He also assumed different posts in East Germany's government.

== Early life and education ==
Maron was born in Berlin on 27 April 1903 and was educated in Russia.

== Career ==
Maron was a metal worker. In 1926, he joined the Communist Party of Germany (KPD). During the Nazi regime, he left Germany in 1934 for Denmark and then settled in Russia. He returned to Berlin under the protection of a Russian general a few days after the Red Army captured the city in 1945. Following his return he became deputy lord mayor of Berlin and the chief of police. As a deputy mayor one of his significant tasks was to rename the streets of Berlin. In 1946, he joined the Socialist Unity Party of Germany (SED). From 1946 to 1950 he was the chief editor of daily Neues Deutschland, which was founded in 1946 by the SED. He was also the director of Berlin municipality's economy department at the end of the 1940s.

He became the chief of the German people's police or more commonly Volkspolizei in June 1950 when former chief Kurt Fischer died. In February 1953, he publicly argued "the Volkspolizei can never be neutral or unpolitical." In 1954, he was named as the member of SED's central committee. During his tenure as the chief of Volkspolizei he also assumed the role of deputy interior minister.

Maron was appointed interior minister on 1 July 1955, replacing Willi Stoph in the post. In this position he was promoted in 1962 to Generaloberst. In 1961, he became a member of the working group formed by the Politburo to develop ways to end refugee flow from East Germany. The other members of the group were then security chief Erich Honecker and Stasi chief Erich Mielke. Maron's tenure as interior minister ended on 14 November 1963. He was succeeded by Friedrich Dickel as interior minister. From 1958 to 1967 he served as the representative of Volkskammer. In 1964, Maron founded the Institute for Demoscopy (Institut für Meinungsforschung in German) that was a demoscopic research body sponsored by the SED.

== Personal life and death ==
Maron was the step-father of author Monika Maron. Karl Maron married her mother in 1955. He died in 1975.

== Legacy ==
A street in East Berlin was named after him, Karl-Maron-Straße, in the 1970s and 1980s.
