= Lothar Ahrendt =

East German minister of Interior (born 1936)

Minister of the Interior of East Germany
- In office 18 November 1989 – 12 April 1990
- Chairman of the Council of Ministers: Hans Modrow
- Preceded by: Friedrich Dickel
- Succeeded by: Peter-Michael Diestel

Personal details
- Born: 13 March 1936 (age 90) Erfurt, Province of Saxony, Nazi Germany
- Party: Socialist Unity Party (1990–2001)

Lothar Ahrendt (born 13 March 1936) is one of the former interior ministers of the German Democratic Republic.

== Biography ==
Ahrendt was born on 13 March 1936 in Erfurt. He was trained as a car mechanic.

Ahrendt was a member of Socialist Unity Party of Germany (SED) which he joined in 1957. He served as deputy interior minister until 18 November 1989, when he was appointed minister of interior, replacing Friedrich Dickel in the post. Ahrendt was part of interim and "reform-minded" cabinet formed by Prime Minister Hans Modrow.

Unlike previous East German interior ministers, Ahrendt was not the chief of the German People's Police (Deutsche Volkspolizei). as for the first time since the DDR's establishment these two offices were divided. However, in February 1990, he was appointed to the post as an acting chief. In mid-January 1990, the Ministry of Interior declared that by 25 January all weapons from former secret police agents, including 124,000 pistols, 76,000 submachine guns, about 3,500 grenade-launchers and 342 anti-aircraft guns, would be retrieved.

Ahrendt's term ended on 12 April 1990. Peter-Michael Diestel succeeded him as interior minister. Ahrendt was also dismissed from the post as the acting chief of the German People's Police in August 1990.

Political offices
Preceded by Friedrich Dickel	Minister of Interior; 1989 – 1990	Succeeded by Peter-Michael Diestel
