= Josef Duchač =

German politician (1938–2026)

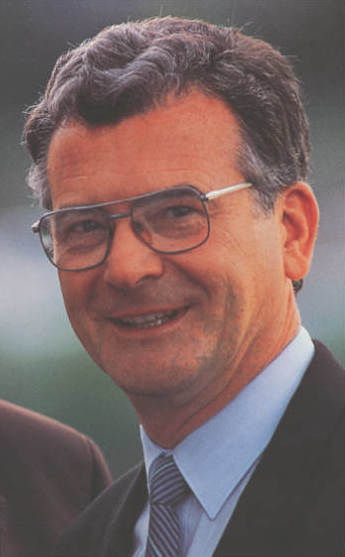
- Duchač on a campaign poster for the 1990 Thuringian state election

Minister-President of Thuringia
- In office 8 November 1990 – 11 February 1992
- Deputy: Ulrich Fickel
- Preceded by: himself (as Landesbevollmächtigter)
- Succeeded by: Bernhard Vogel

Landesbevollmächtigter of Thuringia
- In office 3 October 1990 – 8 November 1990
- Appointed by: Lothar de Maizière
- Preceded by: Position established
- Succeeded by: himself (as Minister-President)

Regierungsbevollmächtigter of Erfurt
- In office 11 June 1990 – 3 October 1990
- Appointed by: Lothar de Maizière
- Preceded by: Arthur Swatek (as Chairman of the District Council)
- Succeeded by: Position abolished

Member of the Landtag of Thuringia for Gotha II
- In office 25 October 1990 – 30 November 1992
- Preceded by: Constituency established
- Succeeded by: Hans-Jörg Dannenberg

Personal details
- Born: 19 February 1938 Jablonecké Paseky, Czechoslovakia
- Died: 23 October 2026 (aged 88)
- Party: Christian Democratic Union (1990–)
- Other political affiliations: Christian Democratic Union (East Germany) (1957–1990)
- Education: Ingenieurschule für Gummi- und Plasttechnologie; TU Dresden; Technical University Leuna-Merseburg (Dipl.-Ing. oec.)
- Occupation: Politician; Chemical Engineer; Engineering Manager

Josef Duchač (19 February 1938 – 23 October 2026) was a German politician from the CDU.

== Life and career ==
Duchač was born on 19 February 1938 in Jablonecké Paseky, Czechoslovakia (now part of Jablonec nad Nisou, Czech Republic). He studied chemical engineer became a member of the East German Christian Democratic Union in 1957. After the party merged with the West German CDU following the German reunification, he was elected Thuringia's first post-reunification minister-president on 14 October 1990.

On 23 January 1992, he announced his resignation because of alleged Stasi contacts and was succeeded by Bernhard Vogel on 5 February 1992.

Duchač died on 23 October 2026, at the age of 88.
