= Marion Rosin =

German politician (born 1969)

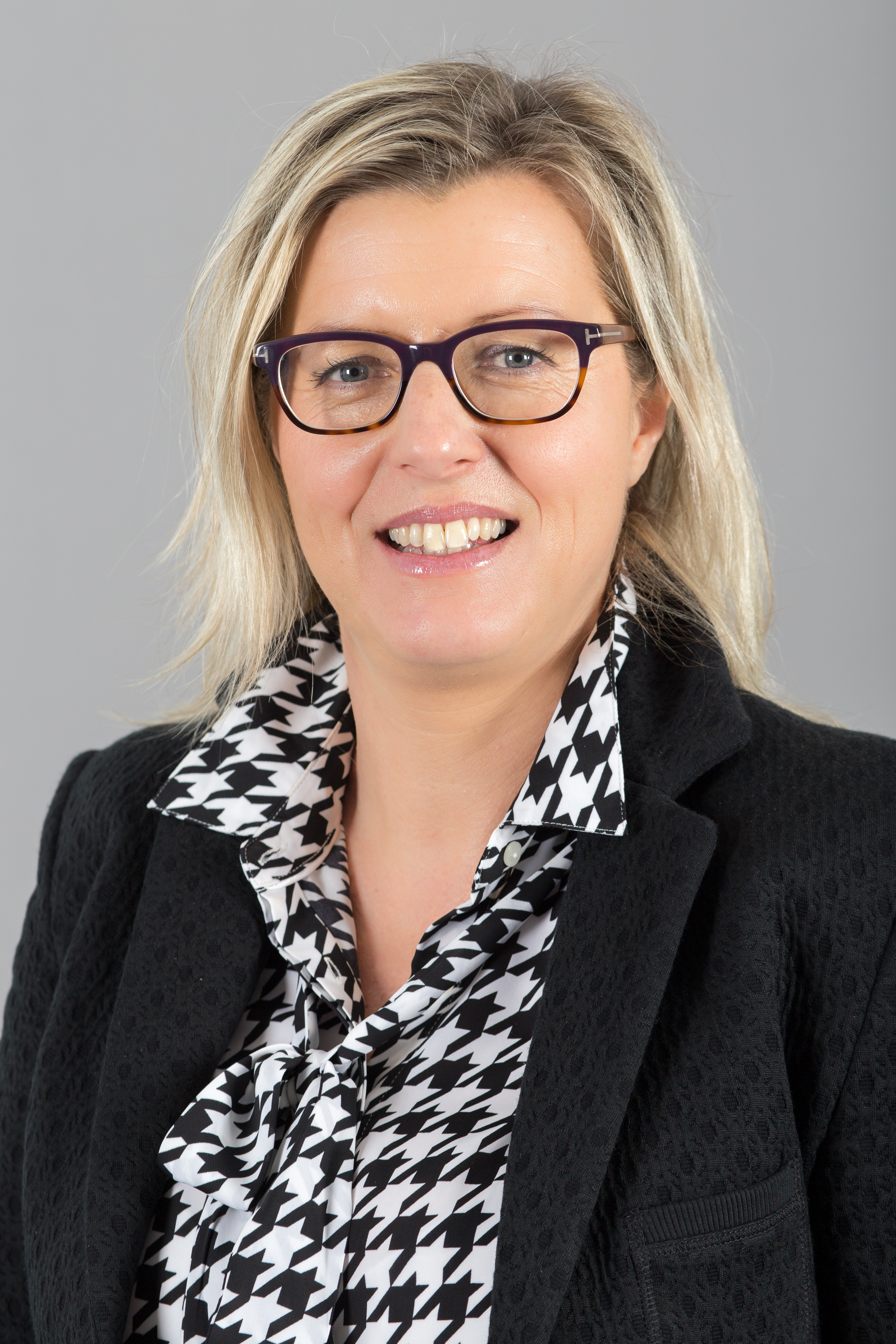
- Rosin in 2016

Member of the Landtag of Thuringia
- Incumbent
- Assumed office 26 September 2024
- In office 14 October 2014 – 26 November 2019

Personal details
- Born: 9 June 1969 (age 56)
- Party: Christian Democratic Union (since 2017)
- Other political affiliations: Social Democratic Party (until 2017)
- Spouse: Richard Dewes

Marion Rosin (born 9 June 1969) is a German politician. She has been a member of the Landtag of Thuringia since 2024, having previously served from 2014 to 2019. She is married to Richard Dewes.
