= State Commissioner (Germany) =

German political role

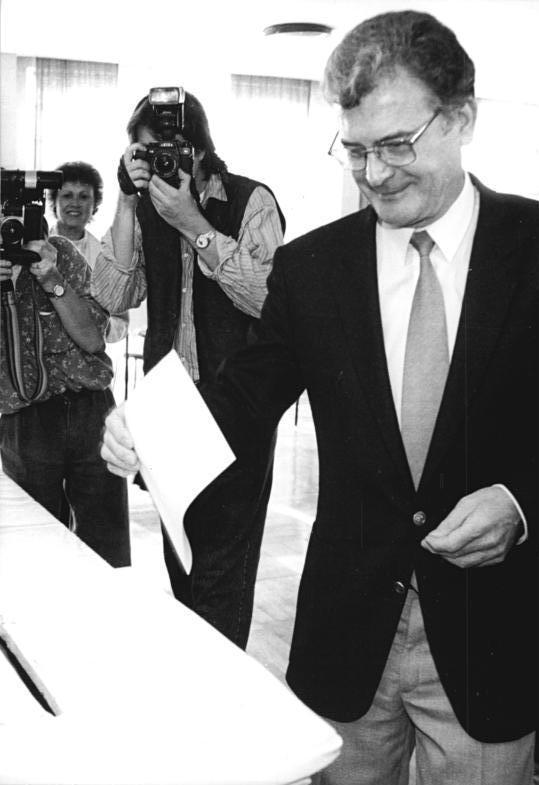
Then-state commissioner Josef Duchač casting his ballot for the 1990 Thuringian state election. He succeeded himself as Minister-President of Thuringia after his party had won the election.

State Commissioner (German: Landesbevollmächtigter) was the title for the provisional heads of government of the new states of Germany shortly after reunification.

German reunification took place on 3 October 1990, when the German Democratic Republic joined the Federal Republic of Germany as five re-established states. However, elections for the state governments of these five states took place on 14 October 1990 and the Landtag of these states elected the respective Minister-Presidents from late October to early November. Between the reunification and the election of each state's respective Minister-President, appointed state commissioners took on the role of heads of government, as stipulated by the German Reunification Treaty.

These state commissioners also represented their respective states in the Bundesrat, but only had an advisory vote.

They had been appointed by Minister-President of the GDR, Lothar de Maizière, on 3 August 1990 as Landessprecher (English: State Speaker). Most state commissioners had previously served as Regierungsbevollmächtigte for one of the Bezirke of the GDR that would later be re-organized to the new states; Brick for Neubrandenburg, Wolf for Potsdam, Krause for Leipzig and Duchač for Erfurt. There was some political controversy as to which Regierungsbevollmächtigter would become Landessprecher.

Except for Karl-Hermann Steinberg, who was revealed to have worked for the East German Stasi, all state commissioners were elected to the respective Landtag and were appointed state ministers:

- Martin Brick was appointed Minister for Food, Agriculture, Forestry and Fisheries of Mecklenburg-Vorpommern
- Jochen Wolf was appointed Minister for Urban Development, Housing and Transportation of Brandenburg
- Rudolf Krause was appointed State Minister of the Interior of Saxony

Josef Duchač succeeded himself as Minister-President of Thuringia.

== State Commissioners ==
State	Name	Term			Party
State	Name	Took office	Left office	Days	Party
Mecklenburg-Vorpommern	Martin Brick (born 1939)	3 October 1990	27 October 1990	24	Christian Democratic Union
Brandenburg	Jochen Wolf (1941–2022)	3 October 1990	1 November 1990	29	Social Democratic Party
Saxony-Anhalt	Karl-Hermann Steinberg (1941–2021)	3 October 1990	28 October 1990	25	Christian Democratic Union
Saxony	Rudolf Krause (born 1939)	3 October 1990	27 October 1990	24	Christian Democratic Union
Thuringia	Josef Duchač (1938-2026)	3 October 1990	8 November 1990 (succeeded himself as Minister-President of Thuringia)	36	Christian Democratic Union
