= 1994 Brandenburg state election =

- 11 September 1994

All 88 seats in the Landtag of Brandenburg 45 seats needed for a majority
- Turnout: 1,072,009 (56.3%) ▼10.8%
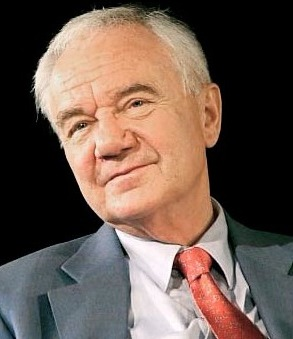

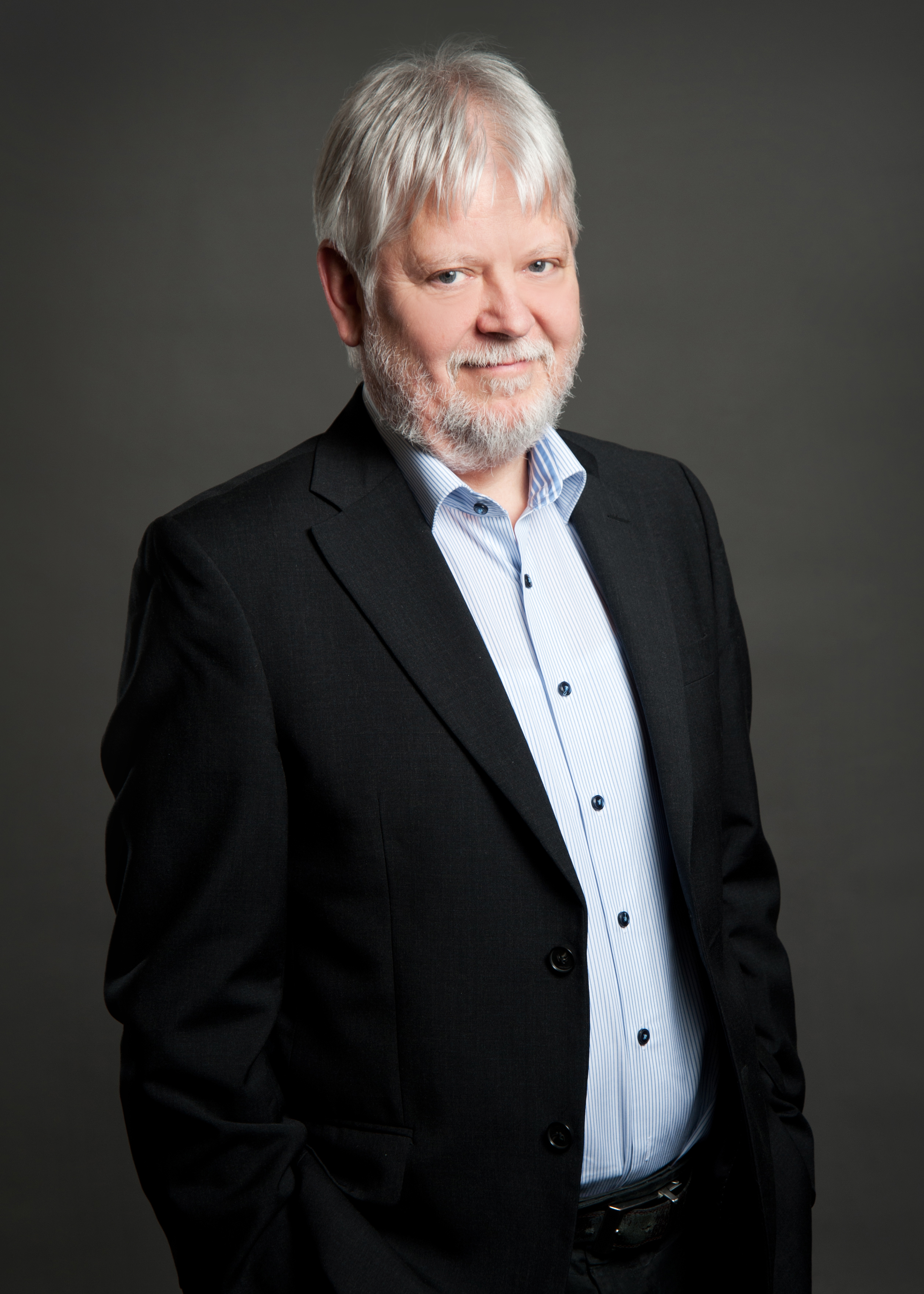
	First party	Second party	Third party
		CDU
Leader	Manfred Stolpe	Peter Wagner	Helmuth Markov
Party	SPD	CDU	PDS
Last election	36 seats, 38.2%	27 seats, 29.4%	13 seats, 13.4%
Seats won	52	18	18
Seat change	▲16	▼9	▲5
Popular vote	580,422	200,700	200,628
Percentage	54.1%	18.7%	18.7%
Swing	▲15.9%	▼10.7%	▲5.3%
	Fourth party	Fifth party
	GRÜNE	FDP
Leader	Sylvia Voß	Detlev Paepke
Party	Greens	FDP
Last election	6 seats, 6.4%	6 seats, 6.6%
Seats won	0	0
Seat change	▼6	▼6
Popular vote	31,033	23,541
Percentage	2,9 %	2,2 %
Swing	▼6,3%	▼4.4%
- Results for the single-member constituencies
Government before election
Stolpe I
SPD–FDP–Alliance 90
Government after election
Stolpe II
SPD majority

The 1994 Brandenburg state election was held on 11 September 1994 to elect the members of the 2nd Landtag of Brandenburg. The incumbent government was a traffic light coalition of the Social Democratic Party (SPD), Free Democratic Party (FDP) and The Greens, led by Minister-President Manfred Stolpe. The SPD achieved a 16 percent swing in its favour and won an absolute majority with 54% of the vote, while both of its coalition partners lost their seats. The Christian Democratic Union (CDU) suffered a major swing against it, falling to 18.7 percent. The Party of Democratic Socialism (PDS) also finished on 18.7 percent, just 72 votes behind the CDU. Minister-President Stolpe continued in office.

This election marked the first, last, and only time that a party gained an absolute majority in Brandenburg. In addition, this was also the first and last time that a party won all single-member constituencies (44).

As of 2024, this is the most recent Brandenburg state election, where a party received more than 50% of the vote.

== Parties ==
The table below lists parties represented in the 1st Landtag of Brandenburg.

Name		Ideology	Leader(s)	1990 result	
Name		Ideology	Leader(s)	Votes (%)	Seats
SPD	Social Democratic Party of Germany; Sozialdemokratische Partei Deutschlands	Social democracy	Manfred Stolpe	38.2%	36 / 88
CDU	Christian Democratic Union of Germany; Christlich Demokratische Union Deutschlands	Christian democracy	Peter Wagner	29.4%	27 / 88
PDS	Party of Democratic Socialism; Partei des Demokratischen Sozialismus	Democratic socialism		13.4%	13 / 88
Grüne	Alliance 90/The Greens; Bündnis 90/Die Grünen	Green politics		9.2% (Note: Results for Alliance 90 (6.4%, 6 seats) and The Greens (2.8%, 0 seats).)	6 / 88
FDP	Free Democratic Party; Freie Demokratische Partei	Classical liberalism		6.6%	6 / 88

== Election result ==
Summary of the 11 September 1994 election results for the Landtag of Brandenburg
Party	Votes	%	+/-	Seats	+/-	Seats %
Social Democratic Party (SPD)	580,422	54.1	▲15.9	52	▲16	59.1
Christian Democratic Union (CDU)	200,700	18.7	▼10.7	18	▼9	20.5
Party of Democratic Socialism (PDS)	200,628	18.7	▲5.3	18	▲5	20.5
Alliance 90/The Greens (Grüne)	31,033	2.9	▼6.3	0	▼6	0
Free Democratic Party (FDP)	23,541	2.2	▼4.4	0	▼6	0
Others	35,685	3.3		0	±0	0
Total	1,072,009	100.0		88	±0	
Voter turnout		56.3	▼10.8			

Popular Vote
SPD	54.14%
CDU	18.72%
PDS	18.72%
B'90/GRÜNE	2.89%
FDP	2.20%
Other	3.33%

Landtag seats
SPD	59.09%
CDU	20.45%
PDS	20.45%

== Sources ==
- Amtliches Endergebnis der Landtagswahl in Brandenburg 1994
