= Gabi Zimmer =

German politician, Member of the European Parliament (born 1955)

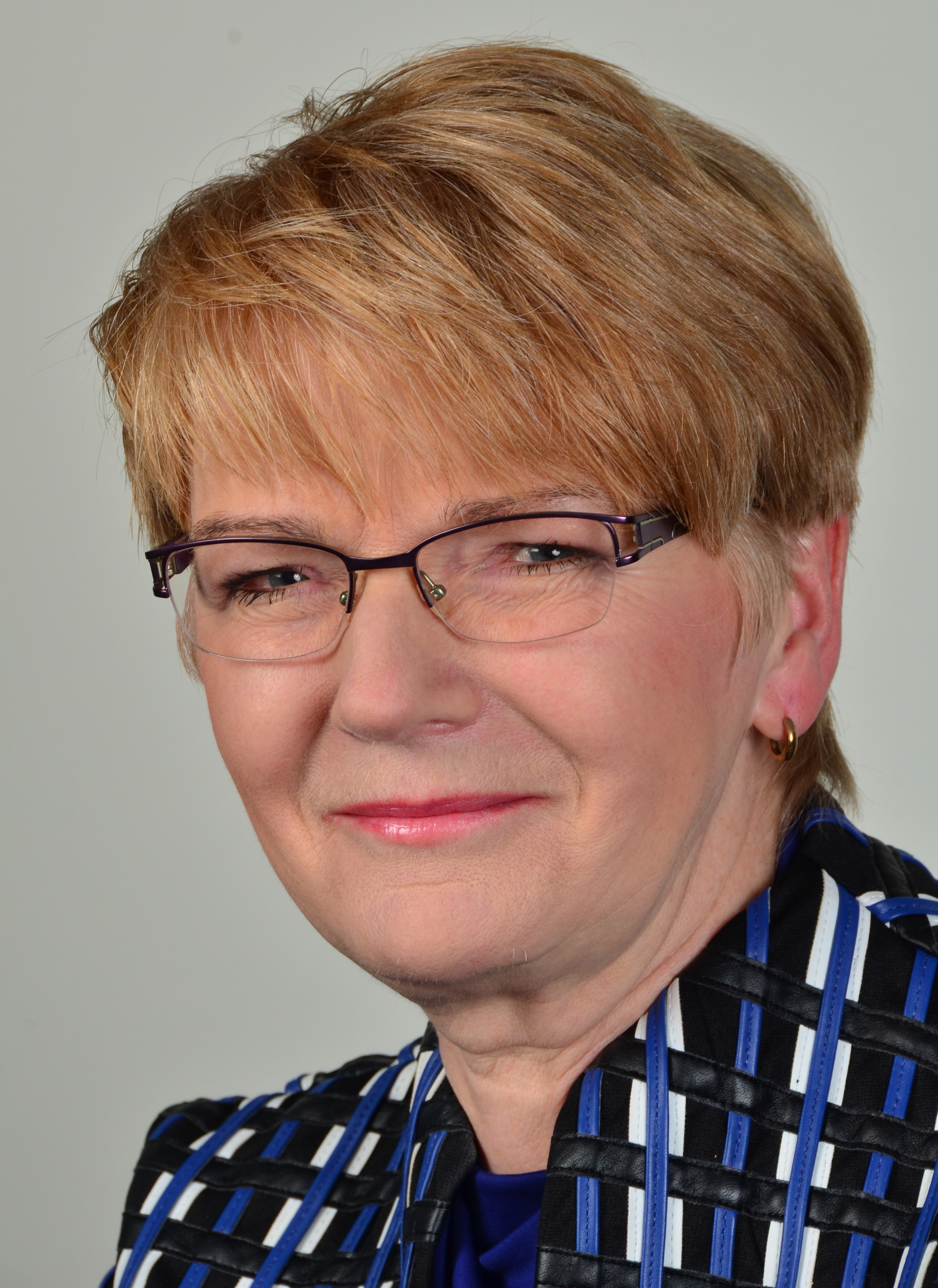
- Zimmer in 2014

Leader of the Party of Democratic Socialism
- In office 14 October 2000 – 29 June 2003
- Preceded by: Lothar Bisky
- Succeeded by: Lothar Bisky

Leader of the Party of Democratic Socialism in Thuringia
- In office July 1990 – December 1998
- Preceded by: Position established
- Succeeded by: Dieter Hausold

Leader of the Party of Democratic Socialism in the Landtag of Thuringia
- In office 1 October 1999 – 1 November 2000
- Preceded by: Birgit Klaubert
- Succeeded by: Werner Buse

Member of the Landtag of Thuringia
- In office 25 October 1990 – 8 July 2004
- Preceded by: Constituency established
- Constituency: PDS List

Member of the European Parliament for Germany
- In office 1 July 2004 – 2 July 2019
- Constituency: The Left List

Personal details
- Born: Gabriele Zimmer; 7 May 1955 (age 70) East Berlin, East Germany
- Party: The Left
- Other political affiliations: Party of Democratic Socialism (1990–2007); Socialist Unity Party of Germany (1981–1990)

Gabriele "Gabi" Zimmer (born 7 May 1955) is a German politician who served as leader of the Party of Democratic Socialism (PDS) from 2000 to 2003. After leaving office as leader, she was a member of the European Parliament from 2004 to 2019. Zimmer sat with the European United Left–Nordic Green Left (GUE/NGL) group, which she chaired from 2012 to 2019.

== Personal life ==
Zimmer was born in East Berlin in 1955. Upon her graduation from high school, she studied Russian and French in the Theoretical and Applied Linguistics section of the Karl Marx University in Leipzig from 1973 to 1977, graduating as a qualified linguist. Then she worked as a clerk at VEB vehicle and hunting weapons factory "Ernst Thälmann" in Suhl. From 1981 to 1987 she was the editor of the company's newspaper, and from 1987 to 1989 she was a member of the SED party leadership of this company.

Zimmer is non-denominational, married, and has two children.

== Political career ==
She joined the Socialist Unity Party of Germany (SED), the ruling party of the German Democratic Republic (East Germany), in 1981. After its transformation into the Party of Democratic Socialism in 1990, she became the party's leader in the new state of Thuringia, a position she held until 1998. She was a member of the Landtag of Thuringia from 1990 until 2004.

Zimmer became federal deputy leader of PDS in 1996. She was elected federal leader in 2000 after the resignation of Lothar Bisky. The party suffered a major defeat in the 2002 federal election, failing to pass the 5% electoral threshold and returning only two representatives. Zimmer was re-elected as leader at the first party congress after the election, but after internal party disputes, announced she would step down and not seek re-election at an extraordinary party congress in 2003. She left the leadership in May of that year.

Zimmer remained active in the party, and was elected to the European Parliament in 2004. In 2007, the PDS merged into The Left. Zimmer was re-elected as an MEP representing The Left in 2009 and 2014. In 2012, she became the chairwoman of the GUE/NGL group in the European Parliament. She did not seek re-election in the 2019 European Parliament election.
