= 1994 Thuringian state election =

State election in Thuringia, Germany

1994 Thuringia state election
← 1990	16 October 1994	1999 →

All 88 seats of the Landtag of Thuringia 45 seats needed for a majority
- Turnout: 1,421,748 (74.8%) ▲3.1 pp
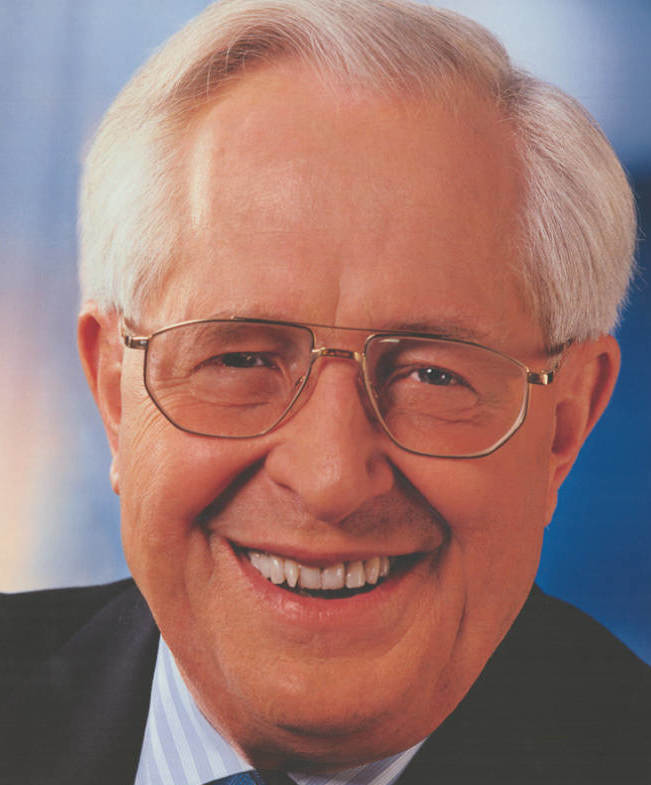

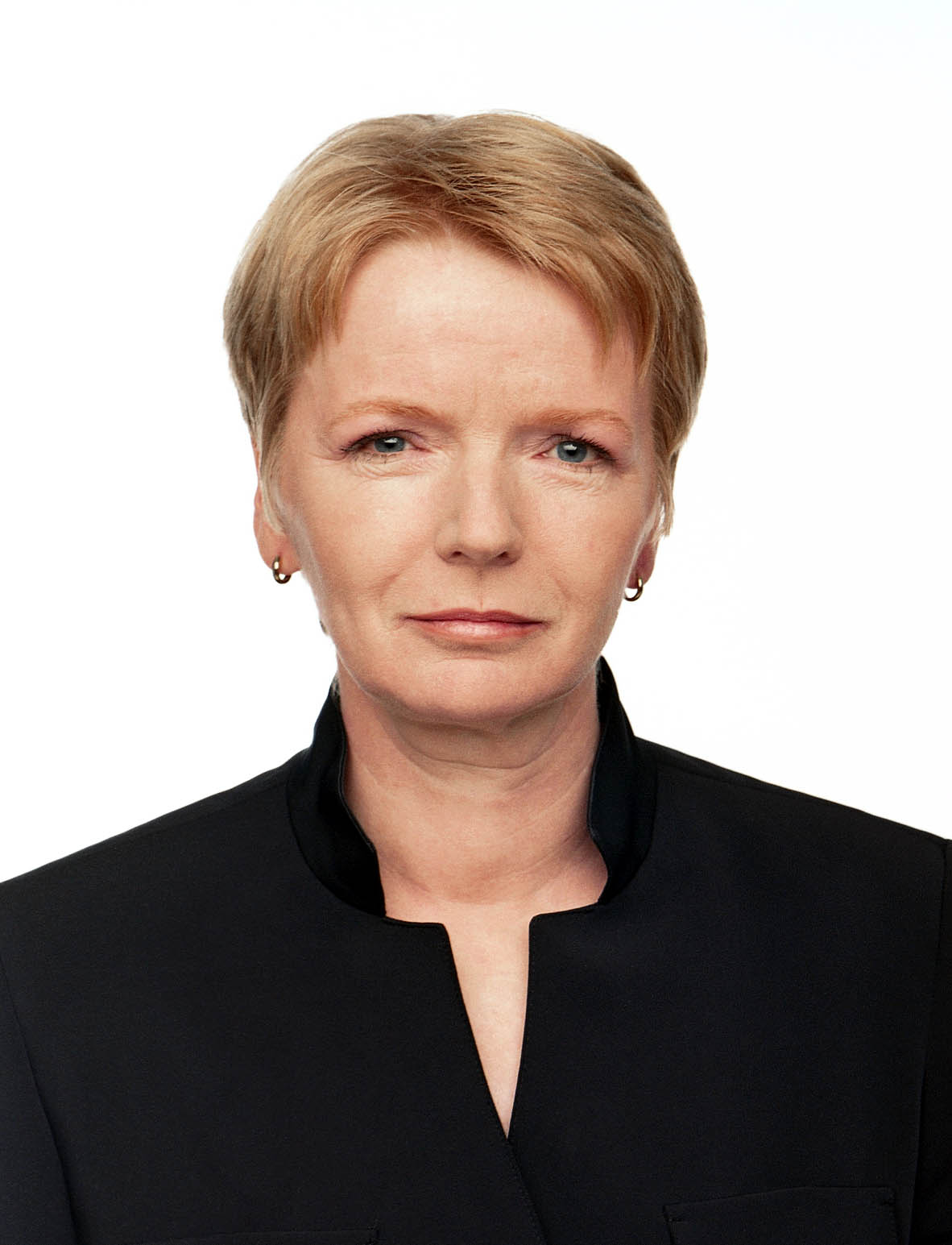
	First party	Second party	Third party
Leader	Bernhard Vogel	Gerd Schuchardt	Gabi Zimmer
Party	CDU	SPD	PDS
Last election	44 seats, 45.4%	21 seats, 22.8%	9 seats, 9.7%
Seats won	42	29	17
Seat change	▼2	▲8	▲8
Popular vote	605,608	420,235	235,556
Percentage	42.6%	29.6%	16.6%
Swing	▼2.8 pp	▲6.8 pp	▲6.9 pp
	Fourth party	Fifth party
Party	Greens	FDP
Last election	6 seats, 6.5%	9 seats, 9.3%
Seats won	0	0
Seat change	▼6	▼9
Popular vote	64,041	45,651
Percentage	4.5%	3.2%
Swing	▼2.0 pp	▼6.1 pp
- Results for the single-member constituencies
Minister-President before election
Bernhard Vogel
CDU
Elected Minister-President
Bernhard Vogel
CDU

The 1994 Thuringian state election was held on 16 October 1994 to elect the members of the 2nd Landtag of Thuringia. The incumbent coalition government of the Christian Democratic Union (CDU) and Free Democratic Party (FDP) led by Minister-President Bernhard Vogel was defeated. The CDU suffered only minor losses, but the FDP lost its representation the Landtag. After the election, the CDU formed a grand coalition with the Social Democratic Party (SPD), and Vogel continued in office.

== Parties ==
The table below lists parties represented in the 1st Landtag of Thuringia.

Name		Ideology	Leader(s)	1990 result	
Name		Ideology	Leader(s)	Votes (%)	Seats
CDU	Christian Democratic Union of Germany; Christlich Demokratische Union Deutschlands	Christian democracy	Bernhard Vogel	45.4%	44 / 89
SPD	Social Democratic Party of Germany; Sozialdemokratische Partei Deutschlands	Social democracy	Gerd Schuchardt	22.8%	21 / 89
PDS	Party of Democratic Socialism; Partei des Demokratischen Sozialismus	Democratic socialism	Gabi Zimmer	9.7%	9 / 89
FDP	Free Democratic Party; Freie Demokratische Partei	Classical liberalism		9.3%	9 / 89
Grüne	Alliance 90/The Greens; Bündnis 90/Die Grünen	Green politics		6.5%	6 / 89

== Election result ==
Landtag composition

Summary of the 16 October 1994 election results for the Landtag of Thuringia
Party	Votes	%	+/-	Seats	+/-	Seats %
Christian Democratic Union (CDU)	605,608	42.6	▼2.8	42	▼2	47.7
Social Democratic Party (SPD)	420,236	29.6	▲6.8	29	▲8	33.0
Party of Democratic Socialism (PDS)	235,556	16.6	▲6.9	17	▲8	19.3
Alliance 90/The Greens (Grüne)	64,041	4.5	▼2.0	0	▼6	0
Free Democratic Party (FDP)	45,651	3.2	▼6.1	0	▼9	0
The Republicans (REP)	18,298	1.3	▲0.5	0	±0	0
New Forum (FORUM)	15,060	1.1	▲1.1	0	±0	0
Others	17,298	1.2		0	±0	0
Total	1,421,748	100.0		88	▼1	
Voter turnout		74.8	▲3.1			

Popular Vote
CDU	42.60%
SPD	29.56%
PDS	16.57%
B'90/GRÜNE	4.50%
FDP	3.21%
Other	3.56%

Landtag seats
CDU	47.73%
SPD	32.95%
PDS	19.32%

== Sources ==
- Landtagswahl 1994 in Thüringen - endgültiges Ergebnis
