= 1990 Thuringian state election =

State election in Thuringia, Germany

1990 Thuringia state election
← 1950 (GDR)	14 October 1990	1994 →

All 89 seats in the Landtag of Thuringia 45 seats needed for a majority
- Turnout: 1,403,354 (71.7%)
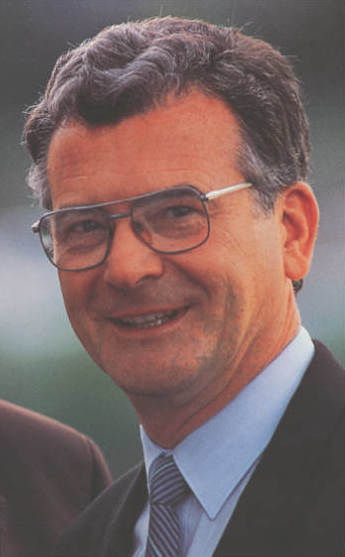

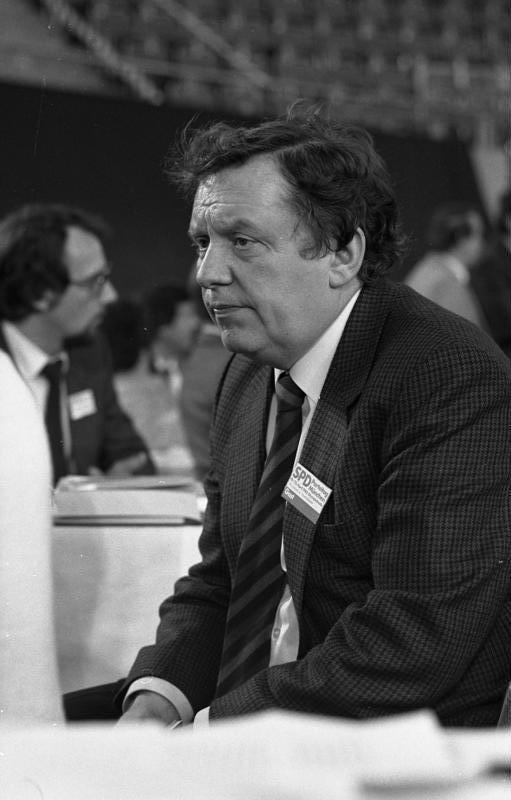

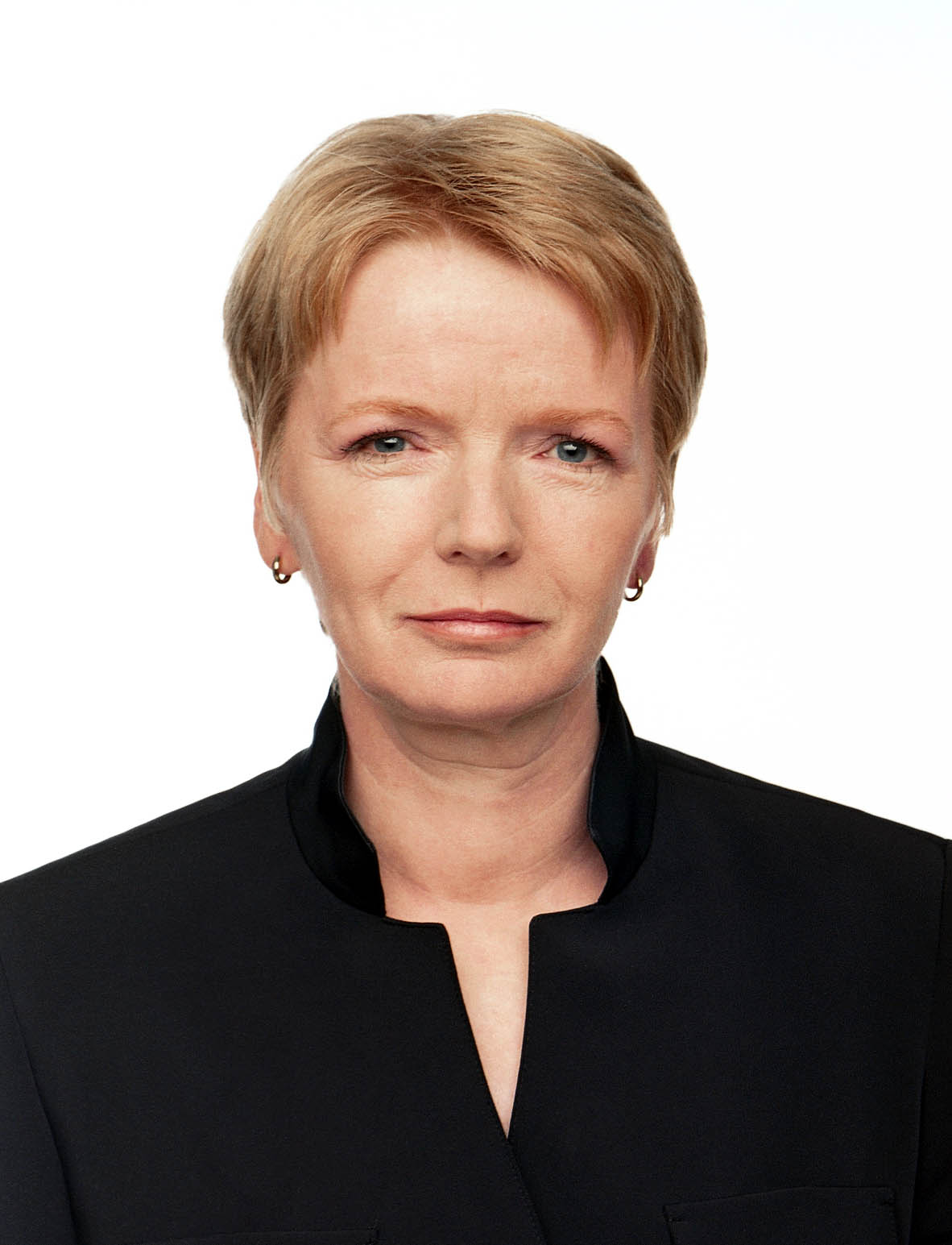
	First party	Second party	Third party
Leader	Josef Duchač	Friedhelm Farthmann	Gabi Zimmer
Party	CDU	SPD	PDS
Seats won	44	21	9
Popular vote	637,055	319,376	136,464
Percentage	45.4%	22.8%	9.7%
	Fourth party	Fifth party
Leader	Hartmut Sieckmann
Party	FDP	Greens
Seats won	9	6
Popular vote	130,035	90,829
Percentage	9.3%	6.5%
- Results for the single-member constituencies
Elected Minister-President
Josef Duchač
CDU

The 1990 Thuringia state election was held on 14 October 1990 to elect the members of the first Landtag of Thuringia. It was the first election held in Thuringia since the reunification of Germany, which took place on 3 October. The Christian Democratic Union (CDU) led by Josef Duchač emerged as the largest party with 45.4%, followed by the Social Democratic Party (SPD) with 22.8%. The CDU formed a coalition with the Free Democratic Party (FDP), and Duchač became Thuringia's first post-reunification Minister-President.

== Parties ==
The table below lists parties which won seats in the election.

Name		Ideology	Leader(s)
CDU	Christian Democratic Union of Germany; Christlich Demokratische Union Deutschlands	Christian democracy	Josef Duchač
SPD	Social Democratic Party of Germany; Sozialdemokratische Partei Deutschlands	Social democracy	Friedhelm Farthmann
PDS	Party of Democratic Socialism; Partei des Demokratischen Sozialismus	Democratic socialism	Gabi Zimmer
FDP	Free Democratic Party; Freie Demokratische Partei	Classical liberalism	Hartmut Sieckmann
Grüne	New Forum/The Greens/Democracy Now; Neues Forum/Die Grünen/Demokratie Jetzt	Green politics	

== Election result ==
Landtag composition

Summary of the 14 October 1990 election results for the Landtag of Thuringia
Party	Votes	%	Seats	Seats %
Christian Democratic Union (CDU)	637,055	45.4	44	49.4
Social Democratic Party (SPD)	319,376	22.8	21	23.6
Party of Democratic Socialism (PDS)	136,464	9.7	9	10.1
Free Democratic Party (FDP)	130,035	9.3	9	10.1
New Forum/The Greens/Democracy Now (Grüne)	90,829	6.5	6	6.7
German Social Union (DSU)	45,979	3.3	0	0
Others	43,616	3.1	0	0
Total	1,403,354	100.0	89	
Voter turnout		71.7		

Popular Vote
CDU	45.40%
SPD	22.76%
PDS	9.72%
FDP	9.27%
B'90/GRÜNE	6.47%
DSU	3.28%
Other	3.11%

Landtag seats
CDU	49.44%
SPD	23.60%
PDS	10.11%
FDP	10.11%
B'90/GRÜNE	6.74%

== Sources ==
- Ergebnisse der Landtagswahlen in Thüringen seit 1945
