= 2024 Thuringian state election =

State election in Germany

- 1 September 2024

All 88 seats in the Landtag of Thuringia 45 seats needed for a majority
- Turnout: 1,218,190 (73.6%) ▲8.7 pp
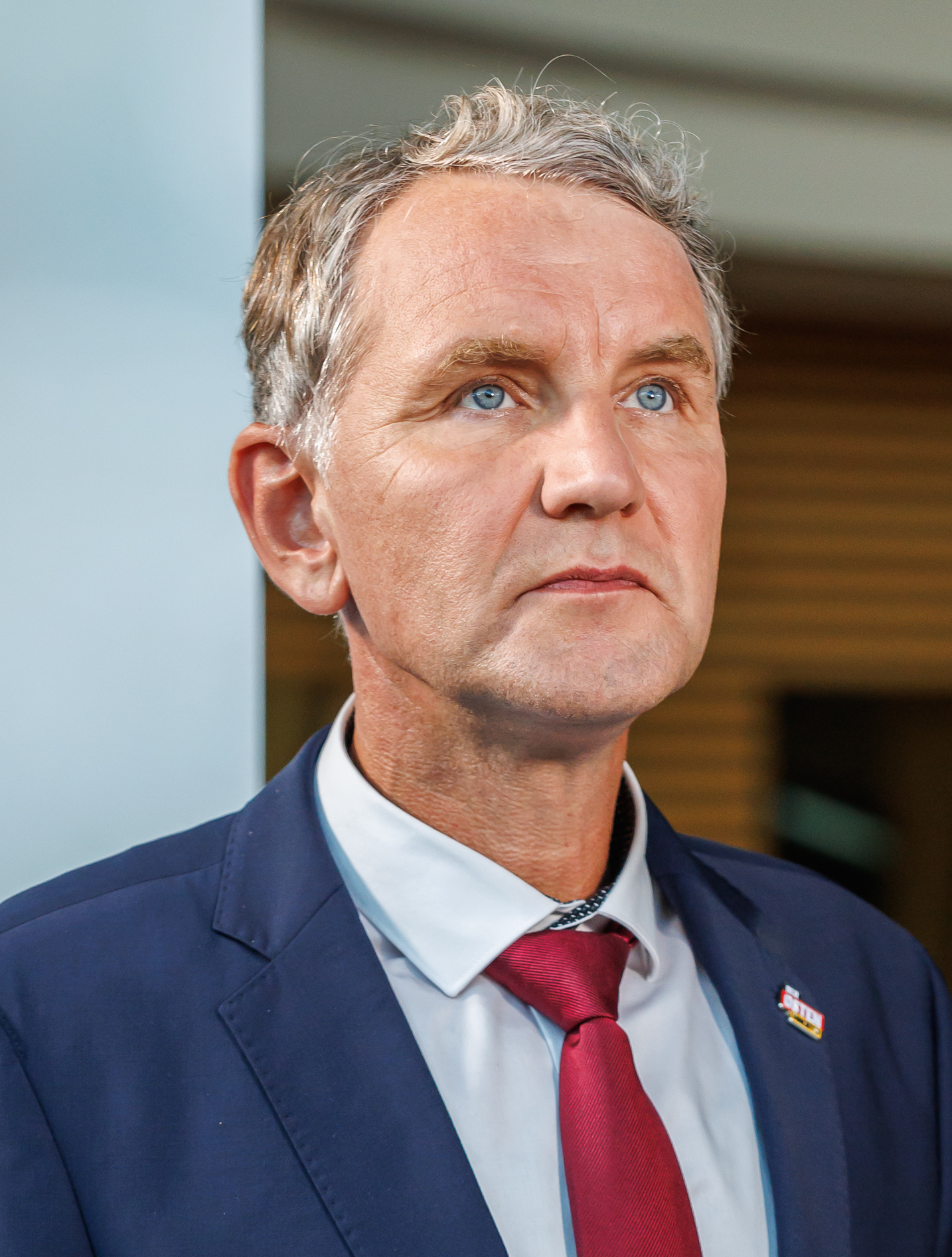

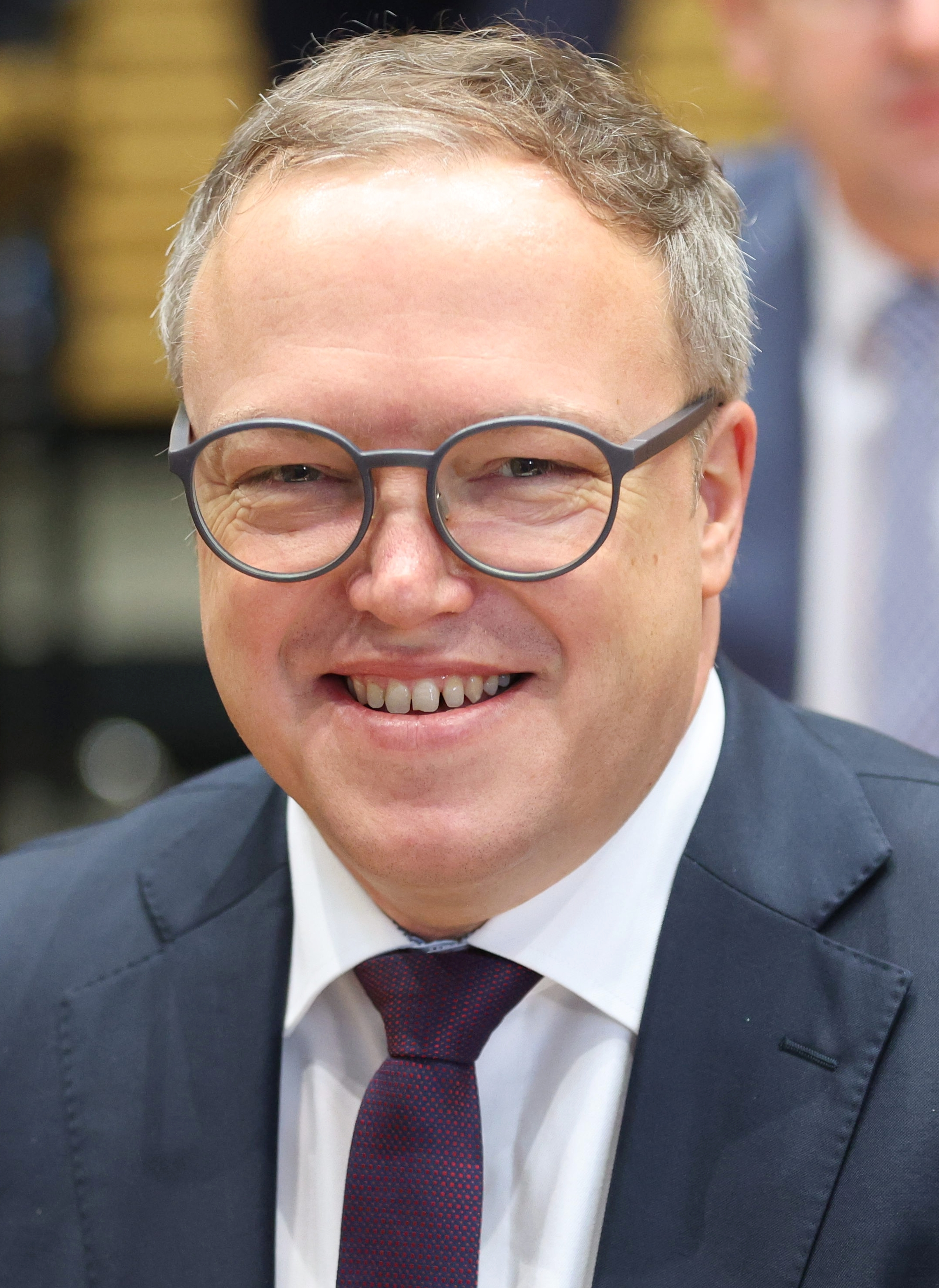

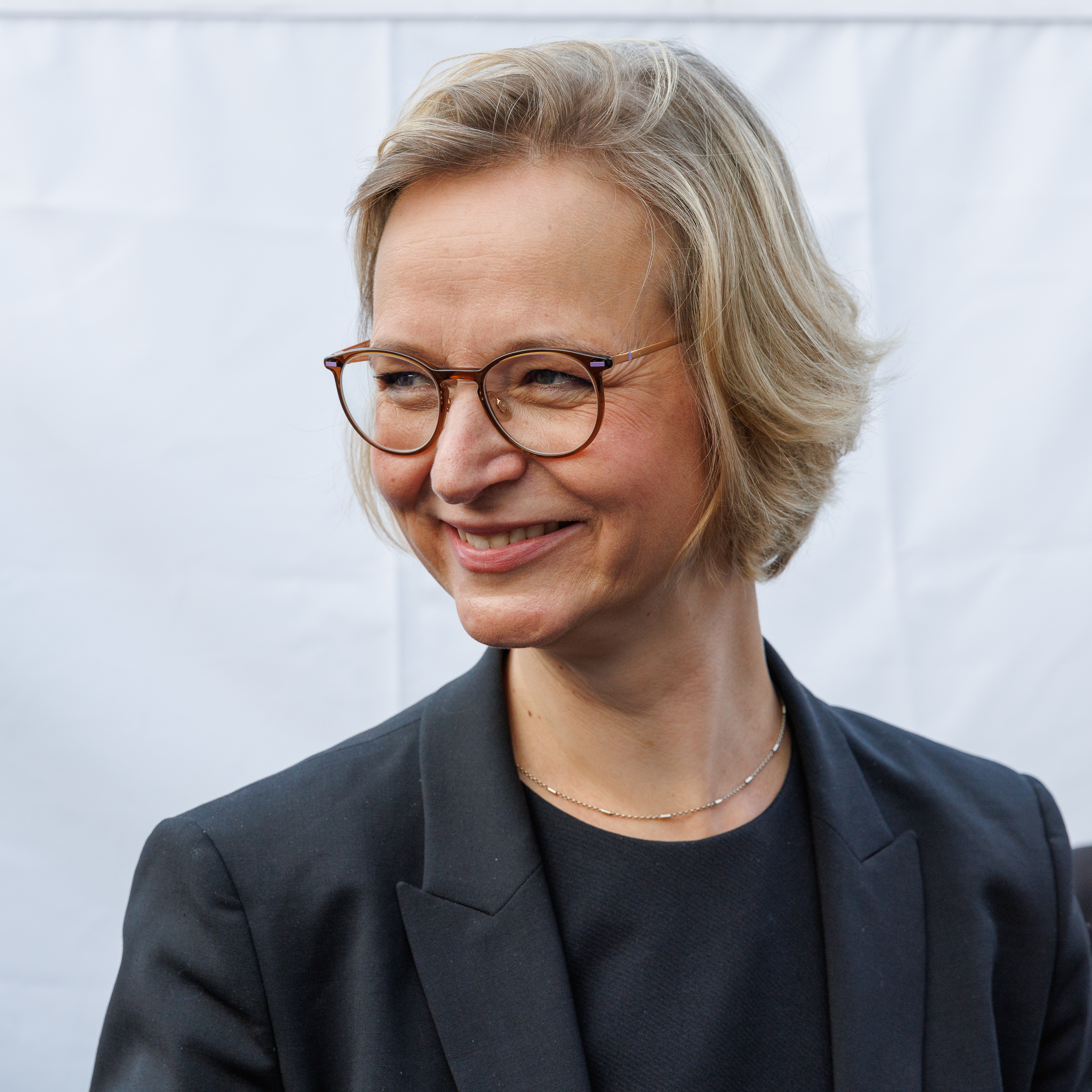

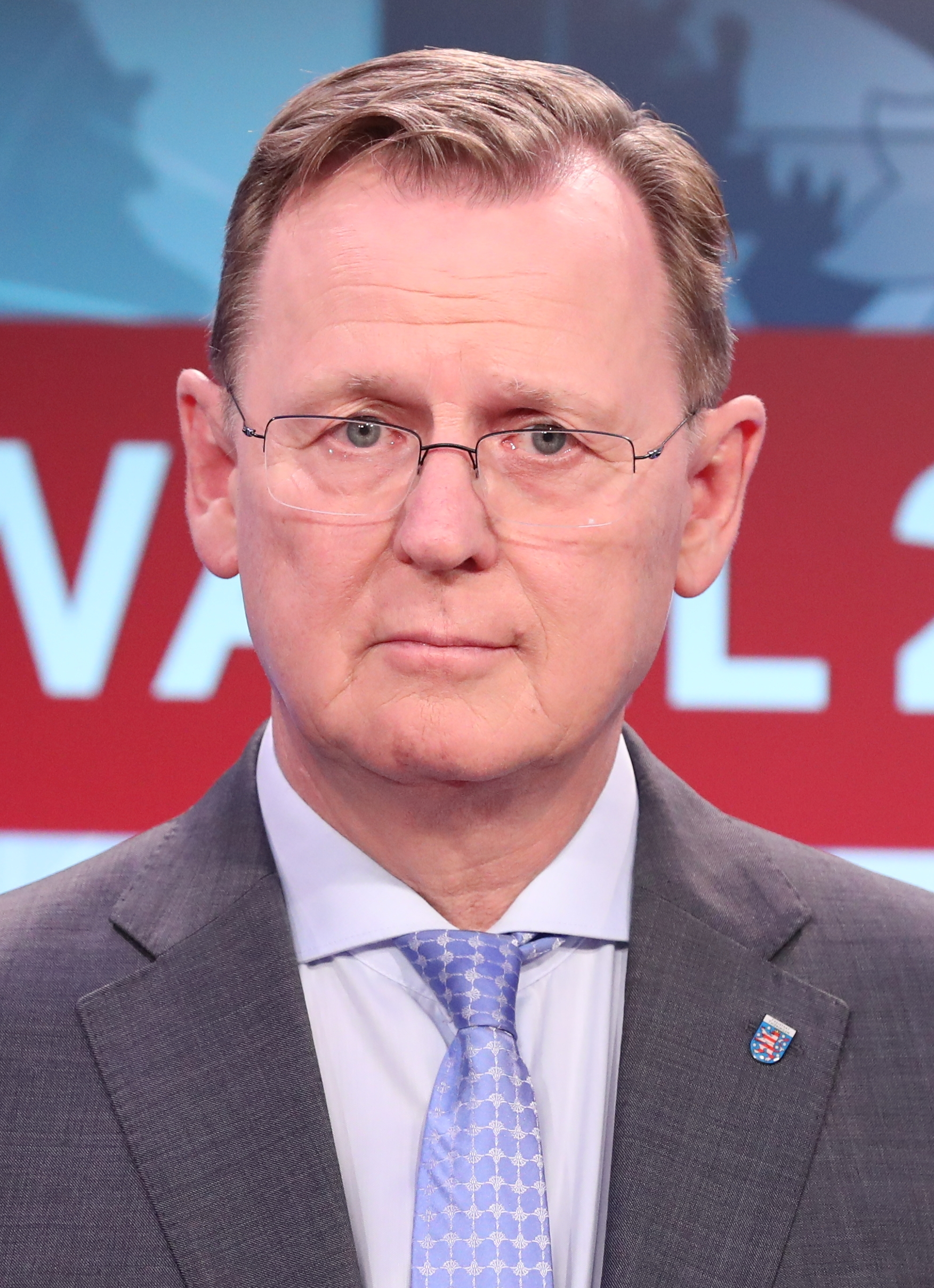

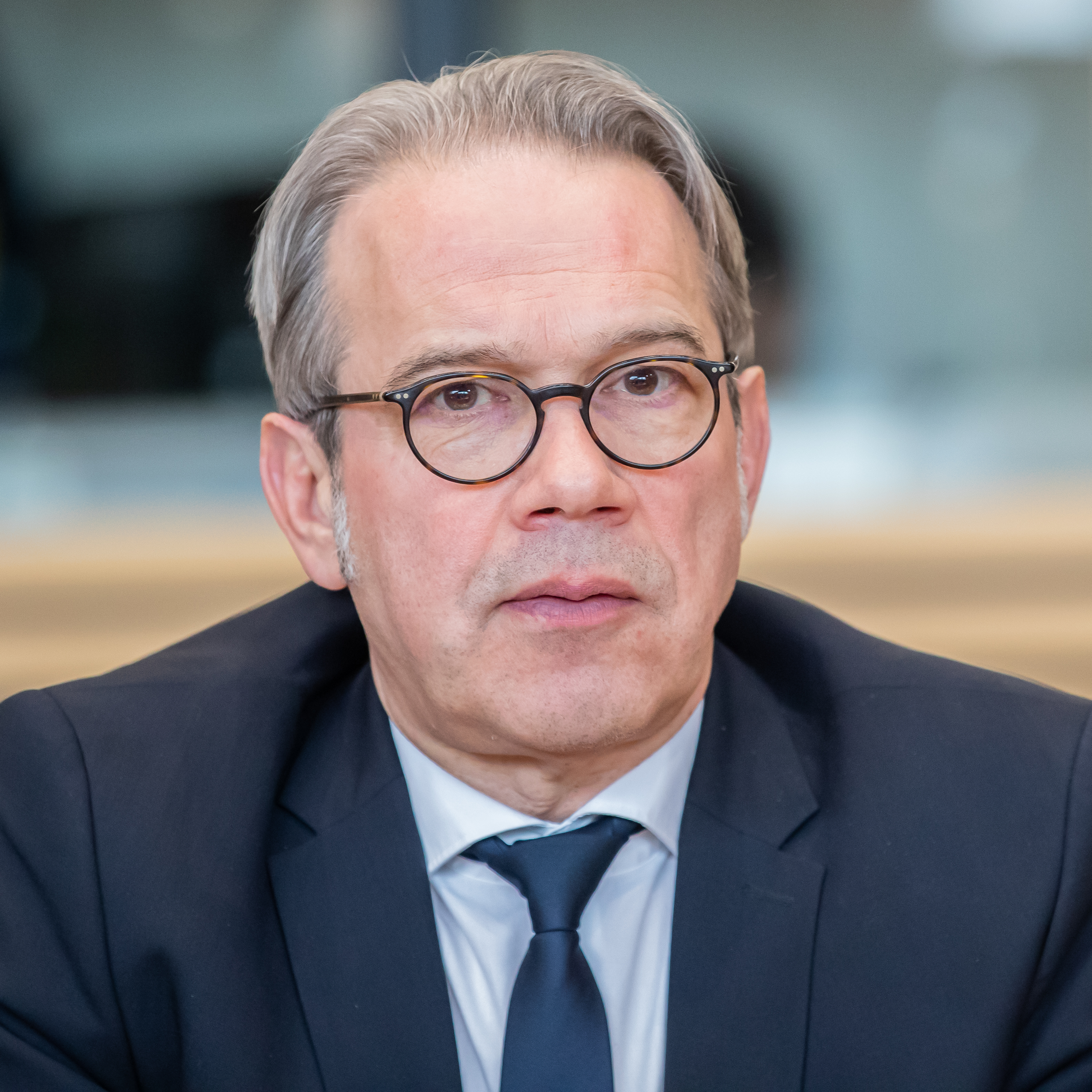

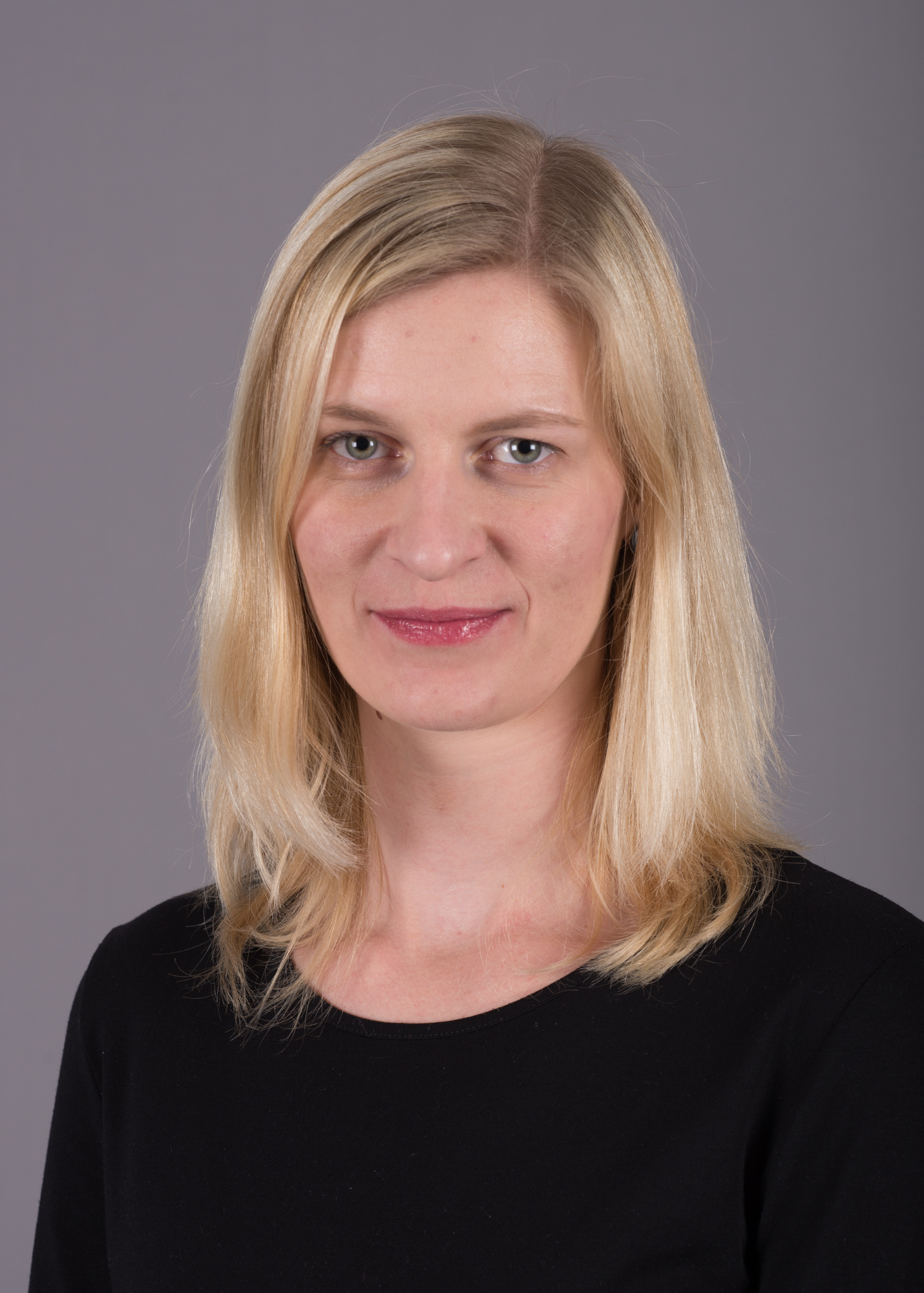

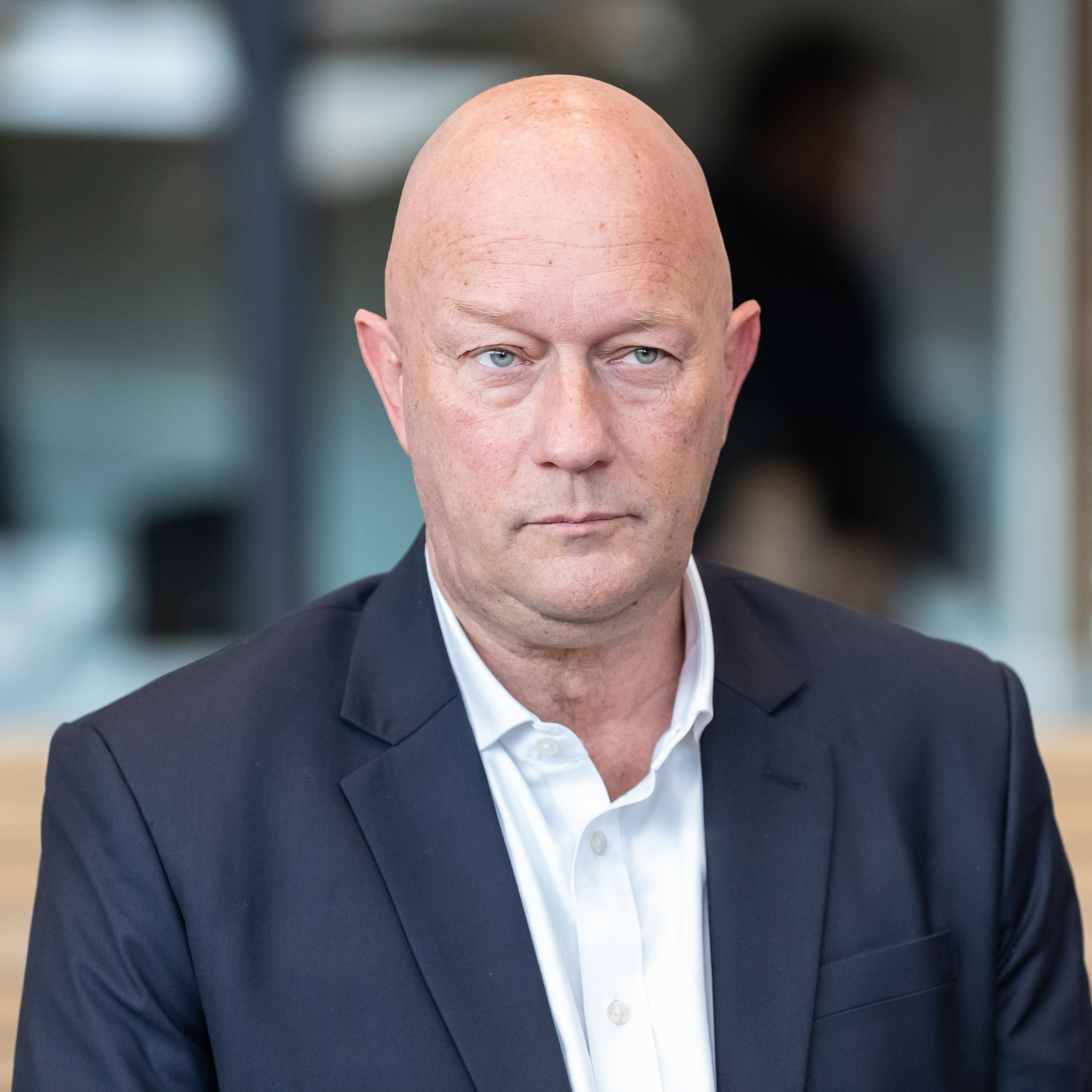
	First party	Second party	Third party
Leader	Björn Höcke	Mario Voigt	Katja Wolf
Party	AfD	CDU	BSW
Last election	22 seats, 23.4%	21 seats, 21.7%	Did not exist
Seats won	32	23	15
Seat change	▲10	▲2	▲15
Popular vote	396,704	285,141	190,448
Percentage	32.8%	23.6%	15.8%
Swing	▲9.4 pp	▲1.9 pp	New party
	Fourth party	Fifth party	Sixth party
Leader	Bodo Ramelow	Georg Maier	Madeleine Henfling
Party	Left	SPD	Greens
Last election	29 seats, 31.0%	8 seats, 8.2%	5 seats, 5.2%
Seats won	12	6	0
Seat change	▼17	▼2	▼5
Popular vote	157,641	73,088	38,289
Percentage	13.1%	6.1%	3.2%
Swing	▼17.9 pp	▼2.1 pp	▼2.0 pp
	Seventh party
Leader	Thomas Kemmerich
Party	FDP
Last election	5 seats, 5.0%
Seats won	0
Seat change	▼5
Popular vote	13,582
Percentage	1.1%
Swing	▼3.9 pp
- Results for the single-member constituencies
Government before election
Second Ramelow cabinet
Left–SPD–Green
Government after election
Voigt cabinet
CDU–BSW–SPD

The 2024 Thuringian state election was held on 1 September 2024 to elect the members of the 8th Landtag of Thuringia. It was held on the same day as the 2024 Saxony state election. The outgoing government was a minority government formed by The Left, the Social Democratic Party (SPD), and The Greens, led by Minister-President Bodo Ramelow of The Left. Ramelow had led the state since 2014, including through the political crisis following the 2020 state election.

The Alternative for Germany (AfD) under state-level leadership of Björn Höcke, both far-right, emerged as the largest party with 33% of the vote, marking its best ever result and the first time it placed first in a state election. The governing coalition suffered heavy losses: The Left, from which the Alliance Sahra Wagenknecht (BSW) had split off in late 2023, lost more than half of its support and fell to fourth place with 13% while the newly-formed BSW picked up these voters and debuted in third with 16%.

Even worse were the results for the three parties that governed Germany since 2021 in the Ampelkoalition of chancellor Olaf Scholz. They lost 3/4 of their combined support, dropped from 39% in Thuringia in the 2021 federal election to only 10%, and would break up the coalition a few weeks later: the SPD at 6% recorded its worst result in any postwar state election up to that time, while the Greens and the Free Democratic Party (FDP) both even failed to clear the Five-percent threshold and lost all of their seats. The Christian Democratic Union (CDU) saw modest gains, placing second with 24%.

The election marked historic breakthroughs: one for the AfD, which became the first far-right party since the Nazi Party (NSDAP) to win a plurality in a German state election. The other first was a Blackberry coalition between CDU, SPD and the new BSW, without a majority due to having 44 of 88 seats. With some support from the Left, Mario Voigt was elected Ministerpräsident, and governs with the Voigt cabinet which, despite its three BSW members leaving the party in September 2026, is expected to continue.

== Election date ==
According to § 18 of the Thuringian Electoral Law for the Landtag, the Landtag election must take place on a Sunday or public holiday at the earliest 57 months after the beginning of the current parliamentary term on 5 February 2020 and at the latest 61 months after, i.e. at the earliest in August 2024 and at the latest December 2024.

According to the Thuringian Constitution, an early election may be held if, at the request of one-third of its members, the Landtag votes with a two-thirds majority to dissolve itself. This may also occur if the Landtag does not vote confidence in a Minister-President within three weeks of a failed vote of confidence in the incumbent. The motion to dissolve the Landtag may only be voted on between eleven and thirty days after its submission. If passed, the election must then take place within 70 days.

=== Proposed snap election cancelled ===
In the aftermath of the 2019/2020 Thuringian government crisis, still in February 2020, the CDU came to an agreement with The Left, SPD, and Greens to elect Ramelow as head of a red-red-green interim minority government for about a year, then dissolve the Landtag and schedule a snap election for 25 April 2021. At the time the four parties held a combined 63 of the 90 seats, two more than the 61 votes required for a dissolution.

By January 2021, during the COVID-19 pandemic, the four parties agreed to postpone the election to 26 September 2021, the same date as the upcoming 2021 German federal election and elections in two other states.

The vote to dissolve the Landtag was scheduled for 19 July 2021. However, the motion was withdrawn on 16 July after four CDU and two Left members informed party leaders they would vote against it, leaving it clearly short of the required majority from within these parties that during these time faced losses in polls, both on state and federal level. Obviously a few ″undesired″ votes from other parties, especially the ones that rose in popularity, could have helped with dissolving the parliament. Left parliamentary leader Stefan Dittes announced there would not be another effort to dissolve the Landtag, and the ″temporary″ red-red-green minority government continued with support from CDU for another three years to complete the regular 5 year term.

== Background ==
=== Previous election ===
In the previous state election held on 27 October 2019, The Left became the largest party for the first time in any German state, winning 31.0% of votes cast. The Alternative for Germany (AfD) made the largest gains, increasing its vote share by almost 13 percentage points and became the second largest party with 23.4%. The Christian Democratic Union (CDU), which had previously been the largest party in the Landtag, lost almost 12 points and fell to third place with 21.7%. The Social Democratic Party (SPD) placed fourth on 8.2%. The Greens narrowly retained their position in the legislature, winning 5.2% of votes. The Free Democratic (FDP) entered the Landtag for the first time since 2009, exceeding the 5% electoral threshold by just 73 votes.

Incumbent Minister President Bodo Ramelow of The Left had led a coalition government of The Left, SPD, and Greens since 2014. The Left's gains were offset by losses for the SPD and Greens, and the coalition lost its majority.

=== Government crisis ===
The loss of a majority for the Ramelow's red-red-green coalition led to an unclear path to a new government. The state constitution provides that a Minister-President is elected with a plurality of votes if two rounds of balloting fails to produce a majority, allowing the coalition to potentially continue as a minority government. In the third round, the FDP leader Thomas Kemmerich stood as symbolic "civic alternative" to the two candidates from left and right, Ramelow and the rather unknown small village mayor nominated by AfD. Unexpectedly, AfD did not continue to support their own candidate in the third round, and Kemmerich was elected as Minister-President on this third ballot, with 45 votes to Ramelow's 44. Kemmerich was elected with the support of the FDP, CDU, and controversially, the AfD. This was the first time AfD votes had decided the election of a head of state government in Germany. The apparent cooperation of the three parties was viewed by some as breaking the cordon sanitaire around AfD which had been in place since its formation, in which all other parties sought to deny AfD government or political influence, refusing to negotiate or work with them on any level. This sparked major controversy nationwide, with many politicians expressing their outrage, including federal Chancellor and former CDU leader Angela Merkel, who described it as "unforgivable" and condemned her party's involvement. Kemmerich announced his resignation on 6 February, just a day after taking office. He remained in office in an interim capacity. In the re-ran vote a month later, Ramelow was re-elected Minister-President.

== Parties and lists ==
Party	2019 result	Con. candidates	List candidates	Lead candidate
The Left (LINKE)	31.0%	44	50	Bodo Ramelow
Alternative for Germany (AfD)	23.4%	42	44	Björn Höcke
Christian Democratic Union (CDU)	21.7%	44	87	Mario Voigt
Social Democratic Party (SPD)	8.2%	42	47	Georg Maier
Alliance 90/The Greens (GRÜNE)	5.2%	20	19	Madeleine Henfling
Free Democratic Party (FDP)	5.0%	33	39	Thomas Kemmerich
Action Party for Animal Welfare (Tierschutz hier!)	1.1%	–	3	Daniel Riedel
Ecological Democratic Party (ÖDP)	0.4%	3	13	Martin Truckenbrodt
Pirate Party Germany (PIRATEN)	0.4%	1	9	Heidrun Jänchen
Marxist–Leninist Party (MLPD)	0.3%	3	13	Tassilo Timm
Bündnis Sahra Wagenknecht (BSW)	–	6	32	Katja Wolf
Free Voters (FW)	–	22	15	Andreas Hummel
Values Union (WU)	–	4	28	Albert Weiler
Alliance Germany (BD)	–	–	15	Steffi Brönner
Family Party (FAMILIE)	–	–	13	Sven Seyfarth
Other	–	6	–	

== Campaign ==
=== Lead candidates ===
On 15 June 2020, the SPD elected Georg Maier as state chairman and lead candidate for the planned 2021 election. This came after previous leader Wolfgang Tiefensee resigned his position.

In September 2020, former Federal Commissioner for the New States Christian Hirte was elected as state CDU chairman, succeeding Mike Mohring, who had resigned during the government crisis in February. On 17 November, the state executive nominated parliamentary group leader Mario Voigt as their preferred lead candidate.

After extended pressure from the federal FDP as well as other state branches, Thomas Kemmerich announced on 11 December that he was ineligible as his party's lead candidate in the planned 2021 election.

== Opinion polls ==
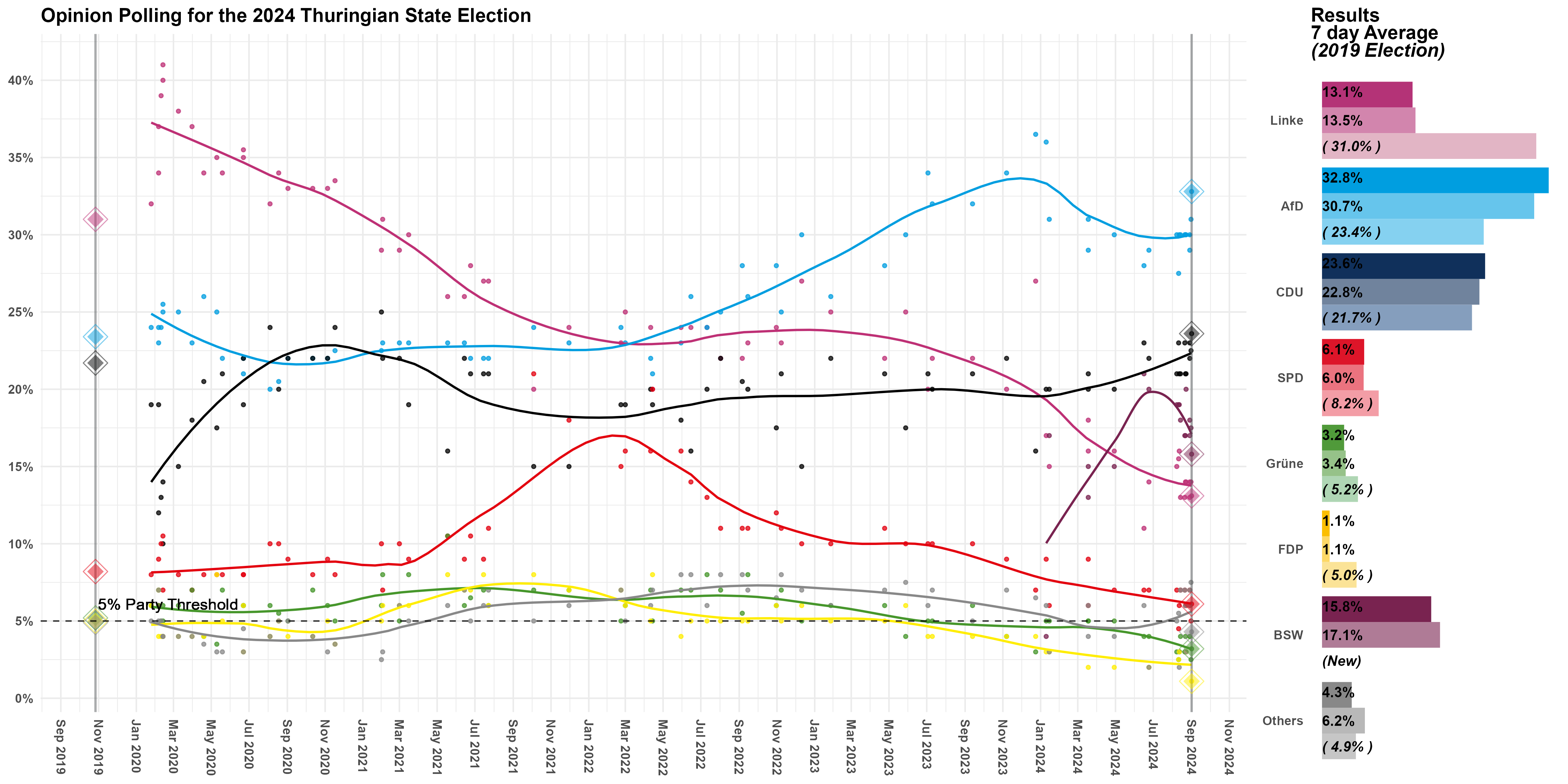
LOESS curve of the polling for the 2024 Thuringian State Election.

=== Party polling ===
Polling firm	Fieldwork date	Sample size	Linke	AfD	CDU	SPD	Grüne	FDP	BSW	Others	Lead
2024 state election	1 Sep 2024	–	13.1	32.8	23.6	6.1	3.2	1.1	15.8	4.3	9.2
Wahlkreisprognose	26–31 Aug 2024	900	14	31	22.5	5	2.5	–	17.5	7.5	8.5
Forsa	27–29 Aug 2024	1,005	14	30	22	7	4	–	17	6	8
Forschungsgruppe Wahlen	26–29 Aug 2024	1,859	13	29	23	6	4	–	18	7	6
INSA	19–23 Aug 2024	1,000	14	30	21	6	3	3	20	3	9
Forschungsgruppe Wahlen	19–22 Aug 2024	1,071	14	30	21	6	4	–	17	6	9
Infratest dimap	19–21 Aug 2024	1,551	13	30	23	7	3	–	17	7	7
Forsa	7–14 Aug 2024	1,011	13	30	21	7	4	–	18	7	9
INSA	5–12 Aug 2024	1,000	16	30	21	6	3	3	19	2	9
Wahlkreisprognose	4–11 Aug 2024	1.000	15.5	27.5	23	4.5	2.5	2.5	19	5.5	4.5
Forschungsgruppe Wahlen	5–8 Aug 2024	1,015	15	30	21	7	3	–	19	5	9
INSA	17–24 Jun 2024	1,000	14	29	22	7	4	2	20	2	7
Infratest dimap	13–16 Jun 2024	1,172	11	28	23	7	4	–	21	6	5
European Parliament election	9 Jun 2024	–	5.7	30.7	23.2	8.2	4.2	2.0	15.0	11.0	7.5
INSA	22–29 Apr 2024	1,000	16	30	20	7	5	2	15	4	10
Infratest dimap	14–18 Mar 2024	1,182	16	29	20	9	5	–	15	6	9
INSA	11–18 Mar 2024	1,000	18	31	21	6	5	2	13	4	10
INSA	8–15 Jan 2024	1,000	15	31	20	6	5	3	17	3	11
Forsa	6–10 Jan 2024	1,253	17	36	20	9	5	3	4	6	16
Wahlkreisprognose	17–24 Dec 2023	987	27	36.5	16	7	3	4	–	6.5	9.5
INSA	30 Oct – 7 Nov 2023	1,000	20	34	22	9	4	4	–	7	12
INSA	7–13 Sep 2023	1,000	22	32	21	10	6	4	–	5	10
INSA	3–10 Jul 2023	1,000	22	32	20	10	5	4	–	7	10
Infratest dimap	28 Jun – 3 Jul 2023	1,193	20	34	21	10	5	4	–	6	13
Wahlkreisprognose	16–28 May 2023	904	25	30	17.5	10	4	6	–	7.5	5
INSA	17–24 Apr 2023	1,000	22	28	21	11	6	5	–	7	6
INSA	20–27 Jan 2023	1,000	25	26	22	10	6	5	–	6	1
Wahlkreisprognose	5–11 Dec 2022	1,016	27	30	15	10	5	6	–	7	3
INSA	1–8 Nov 2022	1,108	23	25	21	11	7	5	–	8	2
Wahlkreisprognose	25–31 Oct 2022	1,008	24	28	17.5	12	6	6	–	6.5	4
INSA	7–15 Sep 2022	1,081	23	26	20	11	8	5	–	7	3
Wahlkreisprognose	29 Aug–6 Sep 2022	1,000	22	28	20.5	11	5.5	5	–	8	6
Infratest dimap	28 Jul–2 Aug 2022	1,172	22	25	22	11	7	5	–	8	3
INSA	4–11 Jul 2022	1,019	24	24	20	13	8	5	–	6	Tie
Wahlkreisprognose	7–15 Jun 2022	1,031	24	26	16	14	7	5	–	8	2
Wahlkreisprognose	23–30 May 2022	1,000	24	23	18	16	7	4	–	8	1
Wahlkreisprognose	6–14 Apr 2022	994	20	21	19	20	5	8	–	7	1
INSA	4–11 Apr 2022	1,027	24	22	20	16	7	5	–	6	2
INSA	1 Mar 2022	1,000	25	23	19	16	6	6	–	5	2
Infratest dimap	17–22 Feb 2022	1,158	23	24	19	15	5	7	–	7	1
INSA	24–30 Nov 2021	1,000	24	23	15	18	7	7	–	6	1
INSA	29 Sep–4 Oct 2021	1,074	20	24	15	21	7	8	–	5	3
2021 federal election	26 Sep 2021	–	11.4	24.0	16.9	23.4	6.6	9.0	–	8.7	0.6
Infratest dimap	20–23 Jul 2021	1,162	27	22	21	11	6	6	–	7	5
INSA	9–15 Jul 2021	1,006	27	22	21	9	7	8	–	6	5
Wahlkreisprognose	17–24 Jun 2021	–	28	22	21	10.5	6.5	7	–	5	6
INSA	7–14 Jun 2021	1,006	26	23	22	9	6	7	–	7	3
Wahlkreisprognose	18 May 2021	–	26	23	16	10.5	10.5	8	–	6	3
INSA	8–16 Mar 2021	1,036	30	23	19	9	8	6	–	5	7
Infratest dimap	25 Feb–1 Mar 2021	1,000	29	23	22	10	5	6	–	6	6
INSA	27 Jan–2 Feb 2021	1,000	31	23	22	7	8	6	–	3	8
Wahlkreisprognose	23–31 Jan 2021	–	29	22.5	25	10	6	5	–	2.5	4
Wahlkreisprognose	10–17 Nov 2020	–	33.5	22.5	24	8	5	3.5	–	3.5	9.5
INSA	2–5 Nov 2020	1,032	33	22	22	9	6	5	–	3	11
INSA	5–12 Oct 2020	1,004	33	22	22	8	7	4	–	4	11
INSA	24 Aug–2 Sep 2020	1,012	33	22	22	9	5	4	–	5	11
Wahlkreisprognose	9–18 Aug 2020	–	34	20.5	20	10	5.5	5	–	5	13.5
Infratest dimap	30 Jul–4 Aug 2020	1,000	32	20	24	10	6	4	–	4	8
Wahlkreisprognose	17–22 Jun 2020	–	35.5	21	19	8	6	6	–	4.5	14.5
INSA	15–22 Jun 2020	1,016	35	22	22	8	6	3	–	3	13
INSA	14–19 May 2020	1,010	34	22	21	8	7	5	–	3	12
Wahlkreisprognose	2–10 May 2020	–	35	25	17.5	8	3.5	8	–	3	10
Wahlkreisprognose	14–19 Apr 2020	–	34	26	20.5	8	4	4	–	3.5	8
INSA	25–31 Mar 2020	1,018	37	23	18	7	7	4	–	4	14
INSA	5–9 Mar 2020	1,034	38	25	15	8	6	4	–	4	13
Wahlkreisprognose	13 Feb 2020	–	41	25.5	10	10.5	5	4	–	4	15.5
INSA	10–13 Feb 2020	1,006	40	25	14	7	6	4	–	4	15
Infratest dimap	7–10 Feb 2020	1,007	39	24	13	10	5	4	–	5	15
Forsa	6 Feb 2020	1,003	37	24	12	9	7	4	–	7	13
INSA	5–6 Feb 2020	1,006	34	23	19	6	6	7	–	5	11
Infratest dimap	21–25 Jan 2020	1,000	32	24	19	8	6	6	–	5	8
2019 state election	27 Oct 2019	–	31.0	23.4	21.7	8.2	5.2	5.0	–	4.9	7.6

=== Hypothetical scenarios ===
Polling firm	Fieldwork date	Sample size	Ramelow list	AfD	CDU	SPD	Grüne	FDP	BSW	Others	Lead
Wahlkreisprognose	17–24 Dec 2023	987	35 (Note: Linke, SPD and BSW within hypothetical Bodo Ramelow list.)	37	15		4.5	3.5		5	2
Wahlkreisprognose	17–24 Dec 2023	987	25.5 (Note: Linke, SPD and Grüne within hypothetical Bodo Ramelow list.)	33	14.5			3.5	17.5	6	7.5

=== Minister President polling ===
Polling firm	Fieldwork date	Sample size												None/ Unsure	Lead
Polling firm	Fieldwork date	Sample size	Ramelow Linke	Höcke AfD	Mohring CDU	Voigt CDU	Maier SPD	Siegesmund Grüne	Stengele Grüne	Henfling Grüne	Kemmerich FDP	Kindervater Independent	Wagenknecht BSW	None/ Unsure	Lead
INSA	5–12 Aug 2024	1,000	18	18	–	11	4	–	1	1	3	–	29	15	11
INSA	5–12 Aug 2024	1,000	26	20	–	–	–	–	–	–	–	–	–	54	6
Wahlkreisprognose	17–24 Dec 2023	987	40	30	–	11	4	–	–	–	6	–	–	9	10
Wahlkreisprognose	17–24 Dec 2023	987	33	26	–	10	4	–	–	–	5	–	13	9	7
Wahlkreisprognose	17–24 Dec 2023	987	50	27	–	–	–	–	–	–	–	–	–	23	23
Wahlkreisprognose	17–24 Dec 2023	987	45	–	–	24	–	–	–	–	–	–	–	31	21
Wahlkreisprognose	17–24 Dec 2023	987	49	–	–	–	13	–	–	–	–	–	–	38	36
Wahlkreisprognose	17–24 Dec 2023	987	–	20	–	–	25	–	–	–	–	–	–	55	5
Wahlkreisprognose	17–24 Dec 2023	987	–	28	–	30	–	–	–	–	–	–	–	42	2
Wahlkreisprognose	17–24 Dec 2023	987	45	–	–	–	–	–	–	–	–	–	15	40	30
INSA	30 Oct – 7 Nov 2023	1,000	34	18	–	12	4	–	–	–	–	–	–	31	16
INSA	17–24 Apr 2023	1,000	35	16	–	12	6	–	–	–	–	–	–	31	19
Wahlkreisprognose	5–11 Dec 2022	1,016	41	31	–	8	8	–	–	–	–	–	–	12	10
Wahlkreisprognose	25–31 Oct 2022	1,008	35	26	–	11	14	–	–	–	–	–	–	14	9
Wahlkreisprognose	29 Aug–6 Sep 2022	1,000	32	26	–	14	14	–	–	–	–	–	–	14	6
INSA	4–11 Jul 2022	1,019	38	11	–	4	3	–	–	–	–	–	–	44	27
Wahlkreisprognose	23–30 May 2022	1,000	40	18	–	15	16	–	–	–	–	–	–	11	22
Wahlkreisprognose	6–14 Apr 2022	994	38	16	–	13	18	–	–	–	–	–	–	15	20
INSA	4–11 Apr 2022	1,027	37	9	–	5	–	–	–	–	–	–	–	49	28
INSA	24 Aug–2 Sep 2020	1,012	42	9	–	7	3	2	–	–	5	–	–	32	33
INSA	5–9 Mar 2020	1,034	56	16	–	–	–	–	–	–	–	–	–	21	40
Forsa	6 Feb 2020	1,003	64	–	9	–	–	–	–	–	6	3	–	18	55
Infratest dimap	21–25 Jan 2020	1,000	60	9	19	–	–	–	–	–	–	–	–	10	41

=== Preferred coalition ===
Polling firm	Fieldwork date	Sample size	Assessment	Linke SPD BSW	Linke SPD Grüne	Linke SPD	Linke CDU BSW	Linke CDU SPD	Linke CDU	Linke CDU SPD FDP	Linke AfD	CDU SPD Grüne	CDU SPD Grüne FDP	CDU SPD FDP	AfD BSW	AfD CDU FDP	AfD CDU
Wahlkreisprognose	17–24 Dec 2023	987	Positive	33	32	–	32	33	31	27	17	–	19	28	32	29	41
Infratest dimap	28 Jun–3 Jul 2023	1,193	Positive	–	27	–	–	–	26	–	–	21	13	27	–	–	31
Infratest dimap	28 Jun–3 Jul 2023	1,193	Negative	–	67	–	–	–	67	–	–	73	81	67	–	–	63
Infratest dimap	30 Jul–4 Aug 2020	1,000	Positive	–	45	43	–	–	32	–	–	36	–	–	–	21	19
Infratest dimap	30 Jul–4 Aug 2020	1,000	Negative	–	52	52	–	–	63	–	–	60	–	–	–	76	78
Infratest dimap	21–25 Jan 2020	1,000	Positive	–	43	–	–	–	33	–	–	–	–	–	–	–	19
Infratest dimap	21–25 Jan 2020	1,000	Negative	–	54	–	–	–	64	–	–	–	–	–	–	–	79

== Results ==
Party	Party-list			Constituency			Total seats	+/–
Party	Votes	%	Seats	Votes	%	Seats	Total seats	+/–
Alternative for Germany (AfD)	396,704	32.84	3	408,011	34.33	29	32	+10
Christian Democratic Union (CDU)	285,141	23.61	12	397,927	33.48	11	23	+2
Bündnis Sahra Wagenknecht (BSW)	190,448	15.77	15	28,478	2.40	0	15	+15
The Left (Die Linke)	157,641	13.05	8	180,207	15.16	4	12	–17
Social Democratic Party (SPD)	73,088	6.05	6	92,510	7.78	0	6	–2
Alliance 90/The Greens (Grüne)	38,289	3.17	0	19,092	1.61	0	0	–5
Free Voters (FW)	15,371	1.27	0	33,405	2.81	0	0	–
Free Democratic Party (FDP)	13,582	1.12	0	18,706	1.57	0	0	–5
Action Party for Animal Welfare (APfT)	12,113	1.00	0				0	–
Values Union (WU)	6,780	0.56	0	4,192	0.35	0	0	–
Family Party (Familie)	5,722	0.47	0				0	–
Bündnis Deutschland (BD)	5,508	0.46	0				0	–
Pirate Party Germany (Piraten)	3,718	0.31	0	449	0.04	0	0	–
Ecological Democratic Party (ÖDP)	2,389	0.20	0	2,196	0.18	0	0	–
Marxist–Leninist Party of Germany (MLPD)	1,342	0.11	0	617	0.05	0	0	–
Other			0	2,696	0.23	0	0	–
Total	1,207,836	100.00	44	1,188,486	100.00	44	88	–2
Valid votes	1,207,836	99.15		1,188,486	97.56			
Invalid/blank votes	10,354	0.85		29,704	2.44			
Total votes	1,218,190	100.00		1,218,190	100.00			
Registered voters/turnout	1,655,343	73.59		1,655,343	73.59			
Source: Results

=== Members ===
Constituency		Member	Party	Votes
001	Eichsfeld I	König, Thadäus	CDU	54.3%
002	Eichsfeld II	Tasch, Christina	CDU	47.1%
003	Nordhausen I	Prophet, Jörg	AfD	40.3%
004	Nordhausen II	Düben-Schaumann, Kerstin	AfD	39.8%
005	Wartburgkreis I	Krell, Uwe	AfD	38.5%
006	Wartburgkreis II – Eisenach	Jary, Ulrike	CDU	42.4%
007	Wartburgkreis III	Malsch, Marcus	CDU	46.3%
008	Unstrut-Hainich-Kreis I	Urbach, Jonas	CDU	37.1%
009	Unstrut-Hainich-Kreis II	Möller, Stefan	AfD	39.7%
010	Kyffhäuserkreis I – Eichsfeld III	Schard, Stefan	CDU	42.0%
011	Kyffhäuserkreis II	Cotta, Jens	AfD	46.5%
012	Schmalkalden-Meiningen I	Rottstedt, Vivien	AfD	37.4%
013	Schmalkalden-Meiningen II	Abicht, Jan	AfD	39.8%
014	Gotha I	Kramer, Marcel	AfD	37.3%
015	Gotha II	Steinbrück, Stephan	AfD	34.7%
016	Sömmerda I – Gotha III	Haseloff, Daniel	AfD	38.6%
017	Sömmerda II	Czuppon, Torsten	AfD	42.8%
018	Hildburghausen I – Schmalkalden-Meiningen III	Hoffmann, Nadine	AfD	41.6%
019	Sonneberg I	Treutler, Jürgen	AfD	42.6%
020	Hildburghausen II – Sonneberg II	Berger, Melanie	AfD	41.6%
021	Suhl – Schmalkalden-Meiningen IV	Luhn, Thomas	AfD	32.8%
022	Ilm-Kreis I	Bühl, Andreas	CDU	39.6%
023	Ilm-Kreis II	Kießling, Olaf	AfD	40.2%
024	Erfurt I	Schlösser, Sascha	AfD	35.7%
025	Erfurt II	Waßmann, Niklas	CDU	33.7%
026	Erfurt III	Ramelow, Bodo	DIE LINKE	42.4%
027	Erfurt IV	Erfurth, Marek	AfD	26.7%
028	Saalfeld-Rudolstadt I	Benninghaus, Thomas	AfD	37.5%
029	Saalfeld-Rudolstadt II	Häußer, Denis	AfD	38.6%
030	Weimarer Land I – Saalfeld-Rudolstadt III	Nauer, Brunhilde Ursula Margit	AfD	38.2%
031	Weimar I – Weimarer Land II	Gerhardt, Peter	AfD	38.3%
032	Weimar II	Grosse-Röthig, Ulrike	DIE LINKE	33.1%
033	Saale-Orla-Kreis I	Thrum, Uwe	AfD	47.4%
034	Saale-Orla-Kreis II	Mühlmann, Ringo	AfD	44.6%
035	Saale-Holzland-Kreis I	Tiesler, Stephan	CDU	39.8%
036	Saale-Holzland-Kreis II	Muhsal, Wiebke	AfD	38.9%
037	Jena I	Thomas, Jens	DIE LINKE	33.5%
038	Jena II	Güngör, Lena Saniye	DIE LINKE	25.1%
039	Greiz I	Schweinsburg, Martina	CDU	46.7%
040	Greiz II	Tischner, Christian	CDU	43.0%
041	Gera I	Laudenbach, Dieter Michael	AfD	36.9%
042	Gera II	Dr. Lauerwald, Wolfgang	AfD	43.6%
043	Altenburger Land I	Hoffmann, Thomas	AfD	42.4%
044	Altenburger Land II	Braga, Torben	AfD	42.8%
List		Müller, Anja	DIE LINKE	
List		Schaft, Christian	DIE LINKE	
List		König-Preuss, Katharina	DIE LINKE	
List		Schubert, Andreas	DIE LINKE	
List		Mitteldorf, Katja	DIE LINKE	
List		Prof. Dr. Hoff, Benjamin Immanuel	DIE LINKE	
List		Stark, Linda	DIE LINKE	
List		Hande, Ronald	DIE LINKE	
List		Höcke, Björn	AfD	
List		Dr. Dietrich, Jens	AfD	
List		Jankowski, Denny	AfD	
List		Voigt, Mario	CDU	
List		Meißner, Beate	CDU	
List		Zippel, Christoph	CDU	
List		Worm, Henry	CDU	
List		Rosin, Marion	CDU	
List		Gerbothe, Carolin	CDU	
List		Geibert, Lennart	CDU	
List		Dr. Weißkopf, Wolfgang	CDU	
List		Heber, Claudia	CDU	
List		Kowalleck, Maik	CDU	
List		Croll, Jane	CDU	
List		Henkel, Martin	CDU	
List		Maier, Georg	SPD	
List		Dr. Klisch, Cornelia	SPD	
List		Hey, Matthias	SPD	
List		Merz, Janine	SPD	
List		Liebscher, Lutz	SPD	
List		Schenk, Katharina	SPD	
List		Wolf, Katja	BSW	
List		Schütz, Steffen	BSW	
List		Quasebarth, Steffen	BSW	
List		Hupach, Sigrid	BSW	
List		Dr. Augsten, Frank	BSW	
List		Hoffmeister, Dirk	BSW	
List		Küntzel, Sven	BSW	
List		Kummer, Tilo	BSW	
List		Kästner, Alexander	BSW	
List		Herzog, Matthias	BSW	
List		Behrendt, Nina	BSW	
List		Wirsing, Anke	BSW	
List		Hutschenreuther, Ralph	BSW	
List		Kobelt, Roberto	BSW	
List		Dr. Wogawa, Stefan	BSW	

AfD vote

CDU vote

BSW vote

Linke vote

SPD vote

Green vote

=== Electorate ===
Demographic	Linke	AfD	CDU	SPD	Grüne	FDP	BSW	Other
Total vote	13.1%	32.8%	23.6%	6.1%	3.2%	1.1%	15.8%	4.3%
Sex
Men	12%	38%	22%	6%	3%	1%	14%	4%
Women	14%	27%	24%	6%	4%	1%	18%	6%
Age
18–24 years old	16%	38%	13%	7%	5%	1%	12%	8%
25–34 years old	14%	36%	16%	7%	6%	1%	13%	7%
35–44 years old	10%	36%	21%	7%	5%	2%	13%	6%
45–59 years old	10%	37%	24%	5%	3%	1%	15%	5%
60–69 years old	13%	32%	26%	5%	1%	1%	19%	3%
70 or older	20%	19%	31%	7%	1%	1%	19%	2%
Employment status
Self-employed	6%	30%	32%	4%	5%	3%	15%	5%
Employees	14%	33%	23%	6%	4%	1%	15%	4%
Workers	8%	49%	15%	4%	2%	1%	16%	5%
Pensioners	16%	23%	30%	7%	1%	1%	19%	3%
Education
Simple education	11%	47%	21%	4%	1%	0%	12%	4%
Medium education	11%	41%	22%	4%	1%	1%	17%	3%
High education	16%	21%	26%	10%	6%	2%	15%	4%
Financial situation
Good	14%	28%	27%	7%	4%	1%	16%	3%
Bad	10%	51%	11%	4%	2%	1%	17%	4%
Source: Infratest dimap

== Analysis and aftermath ==
This was the first time the AfD has won the plurality of seats in a state election. With over one-third of seats, the AfD has a Sperrminorität ("blocking minority"), meaning that certain parliamentary actions requiring a two-thirds majority, such as the appointment of judges, amendments to the state constitution, and an early dissolution of parliament, cannot take place without its support even if it is not in government.

Chancellor Olaf Scholz called on other political parties to prevent the AfD from governing by upholding a "firewall" against them. He described the election results as "bitter" and "worrying" and urged other parties to form stable governments without involving "right-wing extremists." In response, AfD co-leader Alice Weidel stated that voters in Thuringia and Saxony had given her party a "clear mandate to govern" and that "firewalls are undemocratic."

Though a CDU-AfD coalition would have a majority, all other parties have ruled out forming a coalition with the party and its Thuringian leader, Björn Höcke, due to their "extremist tendencies". The State Office for Protection of the Constitution classifies the Thuringian AfD as a "right-wing extremist organisation", and Höcke has been found guilty of using the illegal Nazi-associated slogan "Everything for Germany". The CDU has historically declined to collaborate with Die Linke (The Left), and a coalition with BSW, also a left-wing party, was broadly rejected by party members.

In the aftermath to the elections in both Thuringia and Saxony, Sahra Wagenknecht, leader of the BSW, stated her preference to go into a coalition with either the CDU and/or SPD in an interview with ARD.

=== Landtag opening session controversy ===
The office of President of the Landtag, the body's presiding officer, is traditionally reserved for the largest party in parliament. However, the four other parties all rejected the possibility of the AfD holding this position given its classification as an extremist party. In addition, AfD made known its candidate for President would be its MdL Wiebke Muhsal, who was convicted and fined for defrauding the Landtag administration in 2015. The other parties saw this as a deliberate provocation.

To avoid a potential scenario where a President of the Landtag would be elected with AfD votes, or that of a deadlock with AfD candidates repeatedly being voted down, CDU and BSW jointly proposed changing the election procedure at the first sitting on the 26 of September. The election requires a simple majority, and under the rule then in effect the largest party had the right of nomination (Vorschlagsrecht). If that nominee failed to be elected twice, the rule stated that "new candidates may be proposed for further ballots", but it was unclear who may do this; it was the opinion of AfD that they alone still had the right of nomination, and that the rules could not be changed without a duly elected president. The new proposal was to allow all parties to nominate candidates from the outset. CDU put forward as a consensus candidate its MdL Thadäus König, who received the highest share of constituency votes of any candidate in the election. The other parties indicated they would support him.

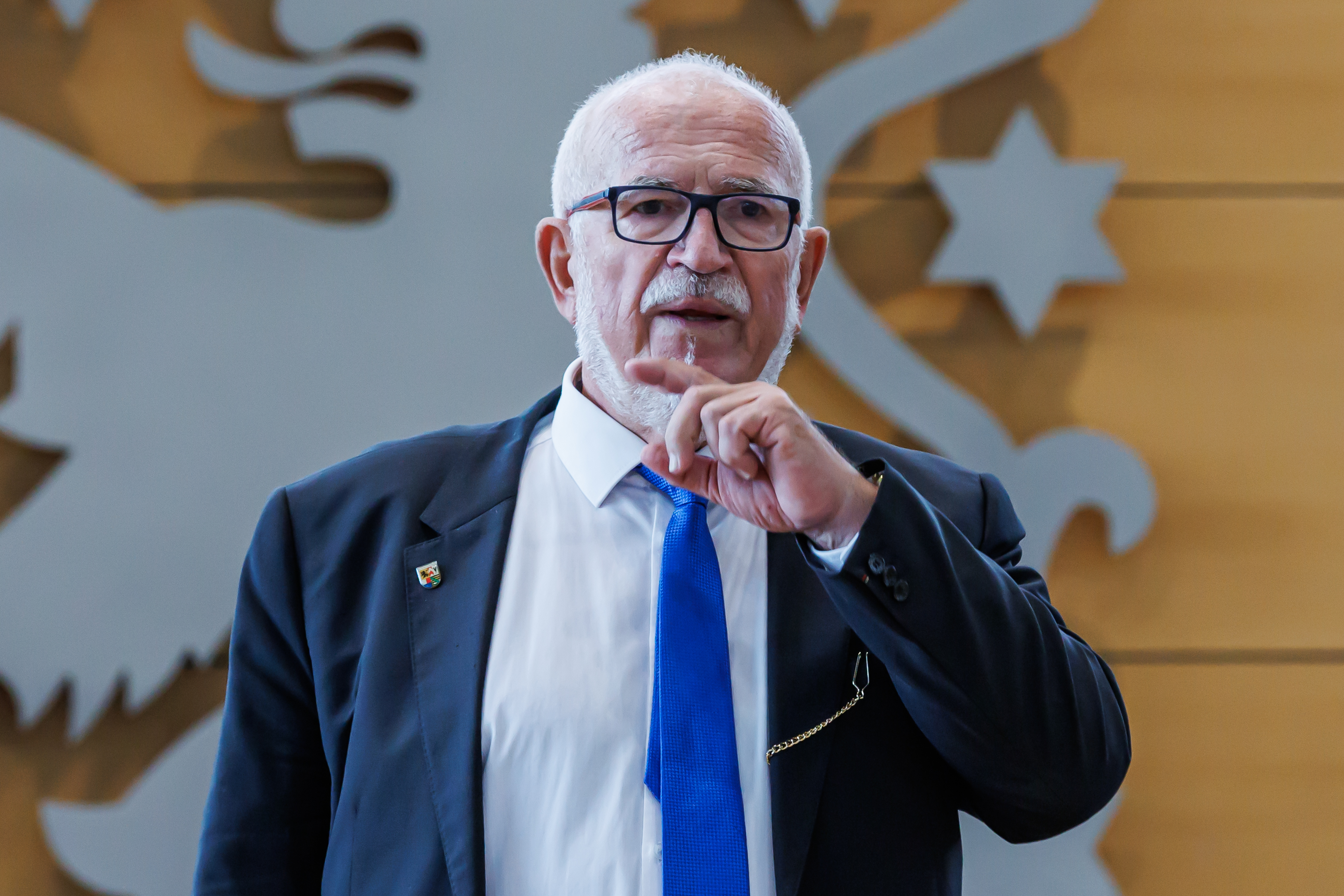
Jürgen Treutler of AfD, Father of the House, attempted to block rule changes to allow a non-AfD Landtag President.

Father of the house Jürgen Treutler of AfD, who was the presiding officer of the Landtag until the election of a president, refused to allow a vote on the rule change, ignored other motions and requests to speak, and ultimately prevented any other business from taking place by refusing to recognize a quorum. He also gave an openly political speech, which was seen as a breach of decorum. The other parties, in particular CDU parliamentary leader Andreas Bühl, accused Treutler of not acting in a non-partisan manner, with Bühl angrily condemning what he called "a seizure of power" during the contentious session. The sitting was abandoned and CDU, supported by other parties, filed an emergency complaint with the Thuringian Constitutional Court in response. Treutler then filed a countercomplaint on 27 September, asking the court to dismiss the CDU complaint as inadmissible.

In the late hours of 27 September, the court ruled unanimously in favor of CDU's complaint. It held that there was no exclusive right for the largest parliamentary group to propose candidates for the office of President of the Landtag, and thus that amending the voting procedure was permissible. The court also confirmed that members have the right to debate and amend the rules before the election of a President of the Landtag. Treutler was thus required to put the motion to a vote at the reconstituted sitting on 28 September, which passed. The CDU candidate König was then elected president with 54 votes to 32 for Muhsal.

In response to this crisis, König advocated for changing the definition of father of the house from the member with the oldest physical age to that with the longest tenure of service; this definition is already used in the federal Bundestag. Die Welt noted that Treutler had been substituted for a unanimously nominated constituency candidate relatively close to the election, and speculated that it was to ensure the party would supply the father of the house. When the paper asked Höcke about this, he simply replied "you can be sure that we at AfD Thuringia have very far-reaching strategic planning".

=== Government formation ===
The day after the election, the CDU executive voted unanimously to seek exploratory talks with the BSW and SPD. BSW leader Katja Wolf stated that federal leader Sahra Wagenknecht would be attending these initial discussions to "stand up for war and peace issues," but would not be involved in further negotiations. Bodo Ramelow and The Left called for the CDU to "act responsibly and find a majority among democratic parties". They also denied rumours that Left party deputies could defect to the BSW to provide the prospective government with a parliamentary majority.

In a speech on 20 September, federal CDU leader Friedrich Merz described a coalition including BSW in either Thuringia or Saxony as "very, very, very unlikely". Nevertheless, exploratory talks for a CDU-BSW-SPD coalition, the so-called “blackberry coalition", began on 30 September. This minority government is still one seat short of a majority, requiring support or abstentions from The Left to conduct business.

On 17 October, Die Welt reported that exploratory talks had concluded and a preliminary distribution of ministries had taken place. There was still no conclusion as to how to achieve a majority. CDU and SPD confirmed the talks had finished, but described the material leaked to Die Welt as "fake".

On 25 October, amid reports that talks were stalling, Wagenknecht was heavily criticized for personally vetoing compromise foreign policy language that was to be inserted into the preamble of a report on the exploratory talks. In an interview with ARD, Merz accused Wagenknecht of "wanting to run a federal election campaign where she constantly says no" instead of attempting to lead, and that his party would not compromise on NATO membership and aid to Ukraine. Though BSW state leaders expressed their desire to continue, SPD state leader Maier told MDR that he had little hope that coalition talks could succeed. Despite this, after a pause in talks over the following weekend, the party leaders announced they had reached a consensus on foreign policy issues and decided to begin formal coalition negotiations.

A completed draft coalition agreement was presented in the Landtag on 22 November. In the first week of December, the CDU party executive approved it with 37 out of 38 votes in favor. BSW submitted it to its full state membership – which at the time was 126 people – and it was approved with 76 votes in favor to 28 against; Wagenknecht had also endorsed ratification of the agreement. SPD also submitted the agreement to its full membership for a vote, which despite a campaign against ratification by the state Jusos saw 68 per cent of the roughly 1,700 votes in favor.

The election of a Minister-President was scheduled for 12 December. The Left conditioned any votes for Voigt on a written agreement formalizing relations between itself and the coalition, in particular the stipulation that the Minister-President vote as well as legislative compromises only involve those four parties "to avoid the potential for blackmail" from AfD. As the national CDU has passed a "resolution of incompatibility" regarding The Left and AfD, which prohibits any formal agreements with either party, Voigt has not agreed to this. The Left, however, noted that such a "stability pact" had been signed with the CDU after the 2020 government crisis. The day before the Minister-President election, the coalition parties made a "3-plus-1" proposal to include The Left as the "constructive opposition", inviting its leaders to monthly legislative consultations in return for support in the election and for the state budget – essentially forming an unwritten confidence and supply agreement.

=== Minister-President election ===
Shortly before the election, Left parliamentary leader Christian Schaft posted on X that several of his bloc's members intended to vote for Voigt, though he cautioned that "our votes are an advance of trust, not a blank check". Voigt was elected Minister-President on the first ballot with 51 votes in favor, 33 votes against, and 4 abstentions.

Minister-President election Mario Voigt (CDU)
Ballot →	First
Required majority →	45 out of 88
For	51 / 88
Against	33 / 88
Abstain/invalid	4 / 88
