= Ilm-Kreis I =

German constituency

Ilm-Kreis I is an electoral constituency (German: Wahlkreis) represented in the Landtag of Thuringia. It elects one member via first-past-the-post voting. Under the current constituency numbering system, it is designated as constituency 22. It covers the southern part of Ilm-Kreis.

Ilm-Kreis I was created for the 1994 state election. Since 2014, it has been represented by Andreas Bühl of the Christian Democratic Union (CDU).

== Geography ==
As of the 2019 state election, Ilm-Kreis I covers the southern part of Ilm-Kreis, specifically the municipalities of Angelroda, Elgersburg, Geratal (only Geraberg), Großbreitenbach, Ilmenau, Martinroda, and Plaue (only Neusiß). It also includes the village of Schmiedefeld am Rennsteig from Suhl.

== Members ==
The constituency was held by the Christian Democratic Union from its creation in 1994 until 2009, during which time it was represented by Siegfried Jaschke. It was won by The Left in 2009, and represented by Petra Enders. The CDU's candidate Andreas Bühl won the constituency in 2014. He was re-elected in 2019 and 2024.

Election	Member	Party	%
1994	Siegfried Jaschke	CDU	44.9
1999	Siegfried Jaschke	CDU	53.9
2004	Siegfried Jaschke	CDU	44.5
2009	Petra Enders	LINKE	40.0
2014	Andreas Bühl	CDU	36.6
2019	Andreas Bühl	CDU	33.3
2024	Andreas Bühl	CDU	39.6

== Election results ==
=== 2024 election ===
State election (2024): Ilm-Kreis I
Notes:	Blue background denotes the winner of the electorate vote. Pink background denotes a candidate elected from their party list. Yellow background denotes an electorate win by a list member, or other incumbent. A ✓ or ✗ denotes status of any incumbent, win or lose respectively.						
Party	Candidate	Votes	%	±%	Party votes	%	±%
CDU	✓ Andreas Bühl	10,583	39.6	▲6.3	5,976	22.2	▲1.8
AfD	Jens Dietrich	9,497	35.5	▲10.3	9,010	33.5	▲9.4
BSW					4,043	15.0	
Left	Christian Schaft	3,381	12.6	▼15.4	3,907	14.5	▼18.6
SPD	Maximilian Reichel-Schindler	1,364	5.1		1,520	5.7	▼1.6
Greens	Madeleine Henfling	895	3.3	▼6.1	1,098	4.1	▼1.5
FW	Mathias Nicolai	789	2.9		324	1.2	
APT					263	1.0	▲0.1
FDP	Martin Mölders	246	0.9	▼2.8	253	0.9	▼3.4
Pirates					118	0.4	Steady
BD					109	0.4	
Familie					100	0.4	
Values					97	0.4	
ÖDP					30	0.1	▼0.2
MLPD					27	0.1	▼0.1
Informal votes		296			176		
Total valid votes		26,755			26,875		
Turnout		27,051	75.5	▲8.8			
CDU hold	Majority	1,086	4.1	▼1.2			

=== 2019 election ===
State election (2019): Ilm-Kreis I
Notes:	Blue background denotes the winner of the electorate vote. Pink background denotes a candidate elected from their party list. Yellow background denotes an electorate win by a list member, or other incumbent. A ✓ or ✗ denotes status of any incumbent, win or lose respectively.						
Party	Candidate	Votes	%	±%	Party votes	%	±%
CDU	✓ Andreas Bühl	8,998	33.3	▼3.3	5,570	20.4	▼11.3
Left	Christian Schaft	7,571	28.0	▼8.4	9,027	33.1	▲2.0
AfD	Jens Dietrich	6,828	25.2		6,569	24.1	▲13.5
Greens	Madeleine Henfling	2,554	9.4	▲1.4	1,530	5.6	▼0.2
FDP	Tim Wagner	1,012	3.7	▲1.0	1,172	4.3	▲2.1
MLPD	Ernesto Joseph Heidenreich	91	0.3		62	0.2	
List-only parties					3,310	12.2	
Informal votes		522			336		
Total valid votes		27,054			27,240		
Turnout		27,576	66.7	▲11.6			
CDU hold	Majority	1,427	5.3	▲5.1			

=== 2014 election ===
State election (2014): Ilm-Kreis I
Notes:	Blue background denotes the winner of the electorate vote. Pink background denotes a candidate elected from their party list. Yellow background denotes an electorate win by a list member, or other incumbent. A ✓ or ✗ denotes status of any incumbent, win or lose respectively.						
Party	Candidate	Votes	%	±%	Party votes	%	±%
CDU	Andreas Bühl	8,639	36.6	▲9.0	7,563	31.7	▲2.8
Left	Eckhard Bauerschmidt	8,604	36.4	▼3.6	7,421	31.1	▲0.5
SPD	Stefan Sandmann	2,649	11.2	▼0.5	2,566	10.8	▼5.9
AfD					2,517	10.6	
Greens	Madeleine Henfling	1,883	8.0	▲2.9	1,380	5.8	▼0.9
NPD	Michael Ranft	1,205	5.1	▲0.9	866	3.6	▼1.2
FDP	Heike Blodig von Sternfeld	636	2.7	▼2.6	529	2.2	▼4.3
List-only parties					1,011	4.2	
Informal votes		529			292		
Total valid votes		23,616			23,853		
Turnout		24,145	55.1	▼3.2			
CDU gain from Left	Majority	35	0.2				

=== 2009 election ===
State election (2009): Ilm-Kreis I
Notes:	Blue background denotes the winner of the electorate vote. Pink background denotes a candidate elected from their party list. Yellow background denotes an electorate win by a list member, or other incumbent. A ✓ or ✗ denotes status of any incumbent, win or lose respectively.						
Party	Candidate	Votes	%	±%	Party votes	%	±%
Left	Petra Enders	10,571	40.0	▲5.5	8,081	30.6	▲4.0
CDU	Beate Misch	7,291	27.6	▼16.9	7,656	28.9	▼16.4
SPD	Frank Juffa	3,088	11.7	▼3.8	4,415	16.7	▲2.4
Free Voters	Rainer Röhner	1,578	6.0		1,304	4.9	▲3.1
FDP	Ingo Stöckel	1,402	5.3		1,724	6.5	▲3.9
Greens	Madeleine Henfling	1,353	5.1	▼0.4	1,776	6.7	▲1.9
NPD	Boris Maier	1,122	4.2		1,266	4.8	▲3.4
List-only parties					225	0.9	
Informal votes		583			541		
Total valid votes		26,405			26,447		
Turnout		26,988	58.3	▲1.4			
Left gain from CDU	Majority	3,280	12.4				

=== 2004 election ===
State election (2004): Ilm-Kreis I
Notes:	Blue background denotes the winner of the electorate vote. Pink background denotes a candidate elected from their party list. Yellow background denotes an electorate win by a list member, or other incumbent. A ✓ or ✗ denotes status of any incumbent, win or lose respectively.						
Party	Candidate	Votes	%	±%	Party votes	%	±%
CDU	✓ Siegfried Jaschke	11,420	44.5	▼9.4	11,756	45.3	▼10.9
PDS	Petra Enders	8,846	34.5	▲12.3	6,897	26.6	▲6.8
SPD	Karin Rossmann	3,975	15.5	▼3.0	3,708	14.3	▼1.4
Greens	Matthias Schlegel	1,398	5.5	▲3.6	1,254	4.8	▲3.3
List-only parties					2,357	9.1	
Informal votes		1,549			1,216		
Total valid votes		25,639			25,972		
Turnout		27,188	56.9	▼8.0			
CDU hold	Majority	2,574	10.0	▼21.7			

=== 1999 election ===
State election (1999): Ilm-Kreis I
Notes:	Blue background denotes the winner of the electorate vote. Pink background denotes a candidate elected from their party list. Yellow background denotes an electorate win by a list member, or other incumbent. A ✓ or ✗ denotes status of any incumbent, win or lose respectively.						
Party	Candidate	Votes	%	±%	Party votes	%	±%
CDU	✓ Siegfried Jaschke	16,504	53.9	▲9.0	17,256	56.2	▲11.0
PDS	Eckhard Bauerschmidt	6,794	22.2	▲4.9	6,093	19.8	▲3.8
SPD	Andreas Enkelmann	5,662	18.5	▼11.9	4,832	15.7	▼13.2
REP	Frank Jahn	748	2.4		164	0.5	▼1.1
Greens	Bernd Hornaff	571	1.9	▼2.8	465	1.5	▼1.8
FDP	Hans-Joachim Wienröder	355	1.2	▼1.5	199	0.6	▼1.9
List-only parties					1,717	5.6	
Informal votes		634			542		
Total valid votes		30,634			30,726		
Turnout		31,268	64.9	▼12.1			
CDU hold	Majority	9,710	31.7	▲17.2			

=== 1994 election ===
State election (1994): Ilmkreis I
Notes:	Blue background denotes the winner of the electorate vote. Pink background denotes a candidate elected from their party list. Yellow background denotes an electorate win by a list member, or other incumbent. A ✓ or ✗ denotes status of any incumbent, win or lose respectively.						
Party	Candidate	Votes	%	±%	Party votes	%	±%
CDU	Siegfried Jaschke	15,994	44.9		16,100	45.2	
SPD		10,807	30.4		10,303	28.9	
PDS		6,152	17.3		5,694	16.0	
Greens		1,666	4.7		1,183	3.3	
FDP		977	2.7		885	2.5	
List-only parties					1,468	4.1	
Informal votes		1,262			1,225		
Total valid votes		35,596			35,633		
Turnout		36,858	77.0				
CDU win new seat	Majority	5,187	14.5				
