= Wartburgkreis I =

Electoral constituency in Thuringia, Germany

Wartburgkreis I is an electoral constituency (German: Wahlkreis) represented in the Landtag of Thuringia. It elects one member via first-past-the-post voting. Under the current constituency numbering system, it is designated as constituency 5. It covers the southern part of Wartburgkreis and a small area of Schmalkalden-Meiningen.

Wartburgkreis I was created for the 1994 state election. Since 2024, it has been represented by Uwe Krell of Alternative for Germany (AfD).

== Geography ==
As of the 2019 state election, Wartburgkreis I covers the southern part of Wartburgkreis and a small area of Schmalkalden-Meiningen, specifically the municipalities of Bad Salzungen (excluding Ettenhausen an der Suhl), Buttlar, Dermbach, Empfertshausen, Geisa, Gerstengrund, Krayenberggemeinde, Leimbach, Oechsen, Schleid, Unterbreizbach, Vacha, Weilar, and Wiesenthal (from Wartburgkreis), and Kaltennordheim (excluding Aschenhausen, Kaltensundheim, Kaltenwestheim, Melpers, Mittelsdorf, Oberkatz und Unterweid) from Schmalkalden-Meiningen.

== Members ==
The constituency was held by the CDU from its creation in 1994 until 2024. Its first representative was Hans-Peter Häfner, who served from 1994 to 1999, followed by Manfred Grob (1999–2019) and Martin Henkel (2019–2024). The AfD gained the seat in 2024.

Election	Member	Party	%
1994	Hans-Peter Häfner	CDU	42.9
1999	Manfred Grob	CDU	49.7
2004	Manfred Grob	CDU	39.9
2009	Manfred Grob	CDU	35.2
2014	Manfred Grob	CDU	42.3
2019	Martin Henkel	CDU	34.4
2024	Uwe Krell	AfD	38.5

== Election results ==
=== 2024 election ===
State election (2024): Wartburgkreis I
Notes:	Blue background denotes the winner of the electorate vote. Pink background denotes a candidate elected from their party list. Yellow background denotes an electorate win by a list member, or other incumbent. A ✓ or ✗ denotes status of any incumbent, win or lose respectively.						
Party	Candidate	Votes	%	±%	Party votes	%	±%
AfD	Uwe Krell	11,962	38.5	▲14.7	11,428	36.4	▲12.2
CDU	✗ Martin Henkel	11,501	37.0	▲2.6	8,793	28.0	▼0.4
BSW					4,483	14.3	
Left	Anja Müller	3,756	12.1	▼11.2	3,130	10.0	▼17.6
FW	Uwe Mannel	1,605	5.2	▲2.7	600	1.9	
SPD	Martin Geissler	1,473	4.7	▼2.2	1,327	4.2	▼3.2
Greens					409	1.3	▼2.1
Values	Alfred Schmidt	405	1.3		275	0.9	
FDP	Leo Bender	270	0.9	▼3.3	278	0.9	▼3.1
APT					278	0.9	Steady
MLPD	Stefan Klaus Engel	136	0.4	Steady	27	0.1	▼0.3
BD					127	0.4	
Familie					127	0.4	
Pirates					62	0.2	▼0.1
ÖDP					52	0.2	▼0.1
Informal votes		530			262		
Total valid votes		31,108			31,376		
Turnout		31,638	72.6	▲9.5			
AfD gain from CDU	Majority	461	1.5				

=== 2019 election ===
State election (2019): Wartburgkreis I
Notes:	Blue background denotes the winner of the electorate vote. Pink background denotes a candidate elected from their party list. Yellow background denotes an electorate win by a list member, or other incumbent. A ✓ or ✗ denotes status of any incumbent, win or lose respectively.						
Party	Candidate	Votes	%	±%	Party votes	%	±%
CDU	Martin Henkel	9,714	34.4	▼7.9	8,047	28.4	▼13.8
AfD	Stefan Mäurer	6,719	23.8		6,842	24.2	▲16.3
Left	Anja Müller	6,585	23.3	▼3.0	7,810	27.6	▲3.0
SPD	Martin Geißler	1,945	6.9	▼10.1	2,086	7.4	▼4.9
Greens	Andreas Hundertmark	1,275	4.5	▼1.0	965	3.4	▼0.3
FDP	Matthias Fallenstein	1,176	4.2	▲1.1	1,121	4.0	▲2.3
Free Voters	Ines Senf	708	2.5				
MLPD	Stefan Engel	115	0.4		104	0.4	
List-only parties					1,328	4.7	
Informal votes		404			338		
Total valid votes		28,237			28,303		
Turnout		28,641	63.1	▲13.7			
CDU hold	Majority	2,995	10.6	▼5.4			

=== 2014 election ===
State election (2014): Wartburgkreis I
Notes:	Blue background denotes the winner of the electorate vote. Pink background denotes a candidate elected from their party list. Yellow background denotes an electorate win by a list member, or other incumbent. A ✓ or ✗ denotes status of any incumbent, win or lose respectively.						
Party	Candidate	Votes	%	±%	Party votes	%	±%
CDU	✓ Manfred Grob	9,890	42.3	▲7.1	9,929	42.2	▲4.8
Left	Anja Müller	6,141	26.3	▲2.4	5,798	24.6	▼0.9
SPD	Jürgen Holland-Nell	3,979	17.0	▲2.5	2,901	12.3	▼2.6
AfD					1,860	7.9	
NPD	Tobias Kammler	1,355	5.8	▼0.7	1,104	4.7	▼1.3
Greens	Andreas Hundertmark	1,290	5.5	▲1.5	873	3.7	0.0
FDP	Helmut Hempel	717	3.1	▼3.9	390	1.7	▼3.9
List-only parties					674	2.9	
Informal votes		410			253		
Total valid votes		23,372			23,529		
Turnout		23,782	49.4	▼4.7			
CDU hold	Majority	3,749	16.0	▲4.7			

=== 2009 election ===
State election (2009): Wartburgkreis I
Notes:	Blue background denotes the winner of the electorate vote. Pink background denotes a candidate elected from their party list. Yellow background denotes an electorate win by a list member, or other incumbent. A ✓ or ✗ denotes status of any incumbent, win or lose respectively.						
Party	Candidate	Votes	%	±%	Party votes	%	±%
CDU	✓ Manfred Grob	9,535	35.2	▼4.7	10,144	37.4	▲0.4
Left	Frank Kuschel	6,458	23.9	▼5.8	6,915	25.5	▲3.6
SPD	Thomas Fischer	3,935	14.5	▼2.7	4,053	14.9	▲2.8
Free Voters	Werner Hellmann	2,424	9.0		1,708	6.3	▼11.7
FDP	Jürgen Bohn	1,887	7.0	▼0.3	1,508	5.6	▲2.9
NPD	Tobias Kammler	1,759	6.5		1,636	6.0	▲4.7
Greens	Mario Amling	1,074	4.0	▼1.9	1,000	3.7	▲0.7
List-only parties					168	0.6	
Informal votes		524			464		
Total valid votes		27,072			27,132		
Turnout		27,596	54.1	▼4.8			
CDU hold	Majority	3,077	11.3	▲1.1			

=== 2004 election ===
State election (2004): Wartburgkreis I
Notes:	Blue background denotes the winner of the electorate vote. Pink background denotes a candidate elected from their party list. Yellow background denotes an electorate win by a list member, or other incumbent. A ✓ or ✗ denotes status of any incumbent, win or lose respectively.						
Party	Candidate	Votes	%	±%	Party votes	%	±%
CDU	✓ Manfred Grob	11,398	39.9	▼9.8	10,874	37.0	▼16.3
PDS	Christina Michael	8,478	29.7	▲9.9	6,435	21.9	▲2.7
Free Voters					5,274	18.0	
SPD	Frank Pach	4,920	17.2	▼6.9	3,549	12.1	▼6.4
FDP	Jürgen Bohn	2,088	7.3	▲5.0	807	2.7	▲1.5
Greens	Helge Fibich	1,682	5.9		888	3.0	▲1.6
List-only parties					1,538	5.2	
Informal votes		2,080			1,281		
Total valid votes		28,566			29,365		
Turnout		30,646	58.9	▲0.7			
CDU hold	Majority	2,920	10.2	▼15.4			

=== 1999 election ===
State election (1999): Wartburgkreis I
Notes:	Blue background denotes the winner of the electorate vote. Pink background denotes a candidate elected from their party list. Yellow background denotes an electorate win by a list member, or other incumbent. A ✓ or ✗ denotes status of any incumbent, win or lose respectively.						
Party	Candidate	Votes	%	±%	Party votes	%	±%
CDU	Manfred Grob	14,760	49.7	▲6.8	15,937	53.3	▲8.2
SPD	Günter Pohl	7,153	24.1	▼11.1	5,525	18.5	▼11.9
PDS	Christina Michael	5,881	19.8	▲6.5	5,746	19.2	▲5.0
REP	Silvio Dettmar	777	2.6		260	0.9	▼0.5
FDP	Gerhard Petter	685	2.3	▼1.0	345	1.2	▼2.2
Independent	Gustav Josef Eib	442	1.5				
List-only parties					2,072	6.9	
Informal votes		643			456		
Total valid votes		29,698			29,885		
Turnout		30,341	58.2	▼17.5			
CDU hold	Majority	7,607	25.6	▲17.9			

=== 1994 election ===
State election (1994): Wartburgkreis I
Notes:	Blue background denotes the winner of the electorate vote. Pink background denotes a candidate elected from their party list. Yellow background denotes an electorate win by a list member, or other incumbent. A ✓ or ✗ denotes status of any incumbent, win or lose respectively.						
Party	Candidate	Votes	%	±%	Party votes	%	±%
CDU	Hans-Peter Häfner	16,330	42.9		17,272	45.1	
SPD	Günter Pohl	13,411	35.2		11,627	30.4	
PDS	Eva-Maria Förtsch	5,054	13.3		5,427	14.2	
Greens	Gerhard Wien	2,045	5.4		1,675	4.4	
FDP	Gerhard Petter	1,251	3.3		1,292	3.4	
List-only parties					994	2.6	
Informal votes		1,474			1,278		
Total valid votes		38,091			38,287		
Turnout		39,565	75.7				
CDU win new seat	Majority	2,919	7.7				
