= Schmalkalden-Meiningen II =

Electoral constituency in Thuringia, Germany

Schmalkalden-Meiningen II is an electoral constituency (German: Wahlkreis) represented in the Landtag of Thuringia. It elects one member via first-past-the-post voting. Under the current constituency numbering system, it is designated as constituency 13. It covers the northern part of Schmalkalden-Meiningen.

Schmalkalden-Meiningen II was created for the 1994 state election. Since 2019, it has been represented by René Aust of Alternative for Germany (AfD).

== Geography ==
As of the 2019 state election, Schmalkalden-Meiningen II covers the northern part of Schmalkalden-Meiningen, specifically the municipalities of Breitungen/Werra, Brotterode-Trusetal, Fambach, Floh-Seligenthal, Rosa, Roßdorf, Schmalkalden, and Steinbach-Hallenberg.

== Members ==
The constituency was held by the Christian Democratic Union from its creation in 1994 until 2009, during which time it was represented by Andreas Trautvetter (1994–1999) and Jens Goebel (1999–2009). It was won by The Left in 2009, and was represented by Manfred Hellmann. The CDU's candidate Christina Liebetrau regained the constituency in 2014. It was won by Alternative for Germany in 2019, and is represented by René Aust.

Election	Member	Party	%
1994	Andreas Trautvetter	CDU	50.1
1999	Jens Goebel	CDU	53.6
2004	Jens Goebel	CDU	37.5
2009	Manfred Hellmann	The Left	27.6
2014	Christina Liebetrau	CDU	42.0
2019	René Aust	AfD	24.2
2024	Jan Abicht	AfD	39.8

== Election results ==
=== 2024 election ===
State election (2024): Schmalkalden-Meiningen II
Notes:	Blue background denotes the winner of the electorate vote. Pink background denotes a candidate elected from their party list. Yellow background denotes an electorate win by a list member, or other incumbent. A ✓ or ✗ denotes status of any incumbent, win or lose respectively.						
Party	Candidate	Votes	%	±%	Party votes	%	±%
AfD	Jan Abicht	10,867	39.8	▲15.6	9,880	35.9	▲11.5
CDU	Stefan Tanneberger	7,641	28.0	▲5.2	5,866	21.3	▼0.9
BSW					4,899	17.8	
Left	Ronald Hande	3,445	12.6	▼7.0	3,117	11.3	▼19.1
SPD	Carsten Feller	2,703	9.9	▼13.4	1,641	6.0	▼4.1
FW	Monique Avemarg	2,292	8.4		521	1.9	
Greens					437	1.6	▼2.0
FDP	Stefanie Gorzize	353	1.3	▼4.7	390	1.4	▼3.2
APT					278	1.0	Steady
BD					127	0.5	
Familie					119	0.4	
Values					109	0.4	
Pirates					98	0.4	Steady
ÖDP					52	0.2	▼0.1
MLPD					22	0.1	▼0.2
Informal votes		443			188		
Total valid votes		27,301			27,556		
Turnout		27,744	72.0	▲9.6			
AfD hold	Majority	3,226	11.8	▲10.9			

=== 2019 election ===
State election (2019): Schmalkalden-Meiningen II
Notes:	Blue background denotes the winner of the electorate vote. Pink background denotes a candidate elected from their party list. Yellow background denotes an electorate win by a list member, or other incumbent. A ✓ or ✗ denotes status of any incumbent, win or lose respectively.						
Party	Candidate	Votes	%	±%	Party votes	%	±%
AfD	René Aust	6,097	24.2		6,157	24.4	▲14.8
SPD	Frank Ullrich	5,877	23.3	▲6.0	2,546	10.1	▼3.5
CDU	✗ Christina Liebetrau	5,736	22.8	▼19.2	5,606	22.2	▼14.2
Left	Ronald Hande	4,927	19.6	▼6.9	7,667	30.4	▲4.4
FDP	Gerald Ullrich	1,499	6.0		1,171	4.6	▲2.1
Greens	Mario Urbach	1,008	4.0	▼1.6	905	3.6	▼0.5
MLPD	Christopher Sengfelder	33	0.1		66	0.3	
List-only parties					1,131	4.5	
Informal votes		346			274		
Total valid votes		25,177			25,249		
Turnout		25,523	62.4	▲10.2			
AfD gain from CDU	Majority	220	0.9				

=== 2014 election ===
State election (2014): Schmalkalden-Meiningen II
Notes:	Blue background denotes the winner of the electorate vote. Pink background denotes a candidate elected from their party list. Yellow background denotes an electorate win by a list member, or other incumbent. A ✓ or ✗ denotes status of any incumbent, win or lose respectively.						
Party	Candidate	Votes	%	±%	Party votes	%	±%
CDU	Christina Liebetrau	9,417	42.0	▲17.4	8,208	36.4	▲5.4
Left	Ronald Hande (Note: Hande entered the Landtag on the Left list after the resignation of Birgit Klaubert in March 2015.)	5,947	26.5	▼1.1	5,860	26.0	▼1.1
SPD	Stephan Danz	3,878	17.3	▼0.8	3,058	13.6	▼4.4
AfD					2,161	9.6	
NPD	Andreas Kunze	1,371	6.1	▲1.8	1,067	4.7	0.0
Greens	Simon Eckhard	1,249	5.6	▲2.2	917	4.1	0.0
Pirates	Jan Schrenke	552	2.5		248	1.1	
List-only parties					1,046	4.6	
Informal votes		570			419		
Total valid votes		22,414			22,565		
Turnout		22,984	52.2	▼2.3			
CDU gain from Left	Majority	3,470	15.5				

=== 2009 election ===
State election (2009): Schmalkalden-Meiningen II
Notes:	Blue background denotes the winner of the electorate vote. Pink background denotes a candidate elected from their party list. Yellow background denotes an electorate win by a list member, or other incumbent. A ✓ or ✗ denotes status of any incumbent, win or lose respectively.						
Party	Candidate	Votes	%	±%	Party votes	%	±%
Left	Manfred Hellmann	7,238	27.6	▼9.4	7,136	27.1	▲2.3
CDU	✗ Jens Goebel	6,485	24.7	▼12.8	8,158	31.0	▼3.0
SPD	Claudia Scheerschmidt	4,711	18.0	▲1.5	4,695	17.9	▲6.2
Free Voters	Ronny Römhild	3,471	13.2		1,761	6.7	▼10.7
FDP	Lutz Recknagel	2,279	8.7	▼0.3	2,037	7.7	▲3.5
NPD	Hendrik Tilmann Heller	1,171	4.5		1,262	4.8	▲3.8
Greens	Alexander Keiner	884	3.4		1,060	4.0	▲1.2
List-only parties					187	0.7	
Informal votes		605			548		
Total valid votes		26,239			26,296		
Turnout		26,844	54.8	▼3.9			
Left gain from CDU	Majority	753	2.9				

=== 2004 election ===
State election (2004): Schmalkalden-Meiningen II
Notes:	Blue background denotes the winner of the electorate vote. Pink background denotes a candidate elected from their party list. Yellow background denotes an electorate win by a list member, or other incumbent. A ✓ or ✗ denotes status of any incumbent, win or lose respectively.						
Party	Candidate	Votes	%	±%	Party votes	%	±%
CDU	✓ Jens Goebel	10,361	37.5	▼16.1	9,642	34.0	▼19.4
PDS	Karl Koch	10,220	37.0	▲17.3	7,049	24.8	▲4.6
Free Voters					4,945	17.4	
SPD	Mario Heyer	4,552	16.5	▼4.3	3,316	11.7	▼5.6
FDP	Lutz Rüdiger Recknagel	2,474	9.0	▲6.8	1,201	4.2	▲2.8
List-only parties					2,246	7.9	
Informal votes		2,038			1,246		
Total valid votes		27,607			28,399		
Turnout		29,645	58.7	▼1.8			
CDU hold	Majority	141	0.5	▼32.3			

=== 1999 election ===
State election (1999): Schmalkalden-Meiningen II
Notes:	Blue background denotes the winner of the electorate vote. Pink background denotes a candidate elected from their party list. Yellow background denotes an electorate win by a list member, or other incumbent. A ✓ or ✗ denotes status of any incumbent, win or lose respectively.						
Party	Candidate	Votes	%	±%	Party votes	%	±%
CDU	Jens Goebel	16,173	53.6	▲3.6	16,172	53.4	▲6.1
SPD	Peter Hammen	6,291	20.8	▼5.0	5,249	17.3	▼10.5
PDS	Karl Koch	5,945	19.7	▲5.6	6,123	20.2	▲6.1
FDP	Peter Wolf	678	2.2	▼2.3	430	1.4	▼2.7
Greens	Beate Bach	565	1.9	▼3.7	419	1.4	▼2.7
REP	Roswitha Koch	543	1.8		166	0.5	▼0.7
List-only parties					1,736	5.7	
Informal votes		572			472		
Total valid votes		30,195			30,295		
Turnout		30,767	60.5	▼15.2			
CDU hold	Majority	9,882	32.8	▲8.5			

=== 1994 election ===
State election (1994): Schmalkalden-Meiningen II
Notes:	Blue background denotes the winner of the electorate vote. Pink background denotes a candidate elected from their party list. Yellow background denotes an electorate win by a list member, or other incumbent. A ✓ or ✗ denotes status of any incumbent, win or lose respectively.						
Party	Candidate	Votes	%	±%	Party votes	%	±%
CDU	Andreas Trautvetter	18,871	50.1		18,029	47.5	
SPD		9,724	25.8		10,554	27.8	
PDS		5,274	14.0		5,298	14.0	
Greens		2,106	5.6		1,525	4.0	
FDP		1,676	4.5		1,520	4.0	
List-only parties					1,033	2.7	
Informal votes		1,647			1,339		
Total valid votes		37,651			37,959		
Turnout		39,298	75.7				
CDU win new seat	Majority	9,147	24.3				
