= Gera I =

Electoral constituency in Thuringia, Germany

Gera I is an electoral constituency (German: Wahlkreis) represented in the Landtag of Thuringia. It elects one member via first-past-the-post voting. Under the current constituency numbering system, it is designated as constituency 41. It covers the northern part of Gera.

Gera I was created in 1990 for the first state election. Originally named Gera-Nord, it was renamed in 1994. Since 2024, it has been represented by Dieter Michael Laudenbach of Alternative for Germany.

== Geography ==
As of the 2019 state election, Gera I covers the northern part of Gera, specifically the city districts (Ortsteile) of Aga, Cretzschwitz, Ernsee, Frankenthal, Hain, Hermsdorf, Milbitz, Roben, Röpsen, Rubitz, Scheubengrobsdorf, Söllmnitz, Thieschitz, Trebnitz, and Windischenbernsdorf.

== Members ==
The constituency was held by the Christian Democratic Union (CDU) from its creation in 1990 until 2004, during which time it was represented by Eckehard Kölbel. In 2004 it was won by Margit Jung of the Party of Democratic Socialism (PDS). She was re-elected as candidate for The Left in 2009 and 2014, followed byDaniel Reinhardt of The Left from 2019-2024. In 2024, the seat was won by Dieter Michael Laudenbach of the AfD.

Election	Member	Party	%
1990	Eckehard Kölbel	CDU	36.8
1994	Eckehard Kölbel	CDU	37.9
1999	Eckehard Kölbel	CDU	40.9
2004	Margit Jung	PDS	38.5
2009	Margit Jung	LINKE	36.2
2014	Margit Jung	LINKE	34.5
2019	Daniel Reinhardt	LINKE	32.5
2024	Dieter Michael Laudenbach	AfD	36.9

== Election results ==
=== 2024 election ===
State election (2024): Gera I
Notes:	Blue background denotes the winner of the electorate vote. Pink background denotes a candidate elected from their party list. Yellow background denotes an electorate win by a list member, or other incumbent. A ✓ or ✗ denotes status of any incumbent, win or lose respectively.						
Party	Candidate	Votes	%	±%	Party votes	%	±%
AfD	Dieter Michael Laudenbach	9,516	36.9	▲6.2	9,022	34.6	▲6.8
CDU	Jochen Trautmann	6,918	26.8	▲9.2	5,575	21.4	▲5.4
BSW					4,306	16.5	
Left	✗ Daniel Karl Reinhardt	5,106	19.8	▼12.7	3,510	13.5	▼19.9
SPD	Janine Puschendorf	1,615	6.3	▼1.7	1,354	5.2	▼3.1
Values	Peter Schmidt	1,206	4.6		315	1.2	
FW	Maik Stephan Witzel	909	3.5	▼0.1	215	0.8	
Greens	Luise Schäfer	513	2.0	▼2.5	758	2.9	▼1.3
APT					325	1.2	▲0.1
FDP					251	1.0	▼3.7
BD					146	0.6	
Familie					106	0.4	
Pirates					79	0.3	▼0.1
ÖDP					52	0.2	▼0.1
MLPD					31	0.1	▼0.2
Informal votes		471			209		
Total valid votes		25,783			26,045		
Turnout		26,254	69.8	▲6.4			
AfD gain from Left	Majority	2,598	10.1				

=== 2019 election ===
State election (2019): Gera I
Notes:	Blue background denotes the winner of the electorate vote. Pink background denotes a candidate elected from their party list. Yellow background denotes an electorate win by a list member, or other incumbent. A ✓ or ✗ denotes status of any incumbent, win or lose respectively.						
Party	Candidate	Votes	%	±%	Party votes	%	±%
Left	Daniel Reinhardt	7,639	32.5	▼2.0	8,359	33.4	▼1.0
AfD	Dieter Laudenbach	7,639	30.7	▲16.3	6,945	27.8	▲13.9
CDU	Jochen Trautmann	4,398	17.6	▼15.9	3,991	16.0	▼13.5
SPD	Hannelore Hauschild	1,983	8.0	▼0.4	2,078	8.3	▼1.0
Greens	Thomas Michael Wieden	1,120	4.5	▼0.8	1,047	4.2	▼1.1
Free Voters	Norbert Hein	885	3.6	▲2.0			
FDP	Patrice Philip Klohn	683	2.7		1,167	4.7	▲2.4
MLPD	Gudrun Kimmerle	120	0.5		80	0.3	
List-only parties					1,339	5.4	
Informal votes		319			232		
Total valid votes		24,919			25,006		
Turnout		25,238	63.4	▲14.9			
Left hold	Majority	451	1.8	▲0.8			

=== 2014 election ===
State election (2014): Gera I
Notes:	Blue background denotes the winner of the electorate vote. Pink background denotes a candidate elected from their party list. Yellow background denotes an electorate win by a list member, or other incumbent. A ✓ or ✗ denotes status of any incumbent, win or lose respectively.						
Party	Candidate	Votes	%	±%	Party votes	%	±%
Left	✓ Margit Jung	7,048	34.5	▼1.7	7,052	34.4	▼0.9
CDU	Birgit Diezel (Note: Diezel entered the Landtag on the CDU list after the resignation of Marion Walsmann in December 2018.)	6,853	33.5	▲2.0	6,050	29.5	▲1.6
AfD	Stephan Brandner	2,949	14.4		2,847	13.9	
SPD	Kirsten Breuer	1,719	8.4	▼5.5	1,909	9.3	▼5.9
Greens	Ulrich Kiethe	1,078	5.3	▼0.5	1,082	5.3	▼0.8
NPD	Gordon Richter	462	2.3	▼2.1	538	2.6	▼1.6
Free Voters	Jörg Schmidt	333	1.6		242	1.2	▼0.6
List-only parties					798	3.9	
Informal votes		374			298		
Total valid votes		20,442			20,518		
Turnout		20,816	48.5	▼5.2			
Left hold	Majority	195	1.0	▼3.7			

=== 2009 election ===
State election (2009): Gera I
Notes:	Blue background denotes the winner of the electorate vote. Pink background denotes a candidate elected from their party list. Yellow background denotes an electorate win by a list member, or other incumbent. A ✓ or ✗ denotes status of any incumbent, win or lose respectively.						
Party	Candidate	Votes	%	±%	Party votes	%	±%
Left	✓ Margit Jung	8,648	36.2	▼2.3	8,435	35.3	▲1.4
CDU	Birgit Diezel	7,524	31.5	▼5.1	6,673	27.9	▼8.9
SPD	Sigrid Müller	3,329	13.9	▲1.3	3,646	15.2	▲1.8
FDP	Dieter Bernd Baumberger	1,923	8.1	▲2.4	2,120	8.9	▲5.4
Greens	Christel Wagner-Schurwanz	1,394	5.8	▼0.7	1,452	6.1	▲1.3
NPD	Gordon Richter	1,053	4.4		1,000	4.2	▲2.5
List-only parties					595	2.5	
Informal votes		487			437		
Total valid votes		23,871			23,921		
Turnout		24,358	53.7	▲4.5			
Left hold	Majority	1,124	4.7	▲2.8			

=== 2004 election ===
State election (2004): Gera I
Notes:	Blue background denotes the winner of the electorate vote. Pink background denotes a candidate elected from their party list. Yellow background denotes an electorate win by a list member, or other incumbent. A ✓ or ✗ denotes status of any incumbent, win or lose respectively.						
Party	Candidate	Votes	%	±%	Party votes	%	±%
PDS	Margit Jung	8,398	38.5	▲3.7	7,471	33.9	▲1.4
CDU	Bernd Koob	7,974	36.6	▼4.3	8,117	36.8	▼5.3
SPD	René Gäbler	2,755	12.6	▼5.1	2,954	13.4	▼3.7
Greens	Eugen Weber	1,414	6.5	▲4.5	1,047	4.8	▲3.1
FDP	Percy Wesselly	1,248	5.7	▲4.6	772	3.5	▲2.7
List-only parties					1,676	7.6	
Informal votes		1,057			809		
Total valid votes		21,789			22,037		
Turnout		22,846	49.2	▼7.8			
PDS gain from CDU	Majority	424	1.9				

=== 1999 election ===
State election (1999): Gera I
Notes:	Blue background denotes the winner of the electorate vote. Pink background denotes a candidate elected from their party list. Yellow background denotes an electorate win by a list member, or other incumbent. A ✓ or ✗ denotes status of any incumbent, win or lose respectively.						
Party	Candidate	Votes	%	±%	Party votes	%	±%
CDU	✓ Eckehard Kölbel	10,887	40.9	▲3.0	11,238	42.1	▲5.4
PDS		9,279	34.8	▲5.5	8,658	32.5	▲5.5
SPD		4,714	17.7	▼7.4	4,561	17.1	▼8.1
REP		616	2.3	▲1.0	170	0.6	▼0.5
Greens		522	2.0	▼4.4	450	1.7	▼3.0
New Forum		326	1.2		143	0.5	▼0.3
FDP		290	1.1		211	0.8	▼1.9
List-only parties					1,245	4.7	
Informal votes		314			272		
Total valid votes		26,634			26,676		
Turnout		26,948	57.0	▼15.0			
CDU hold	Majority	1,608	6.1	▼2.5			

=== 1994 election ===
State election (1994): Gera I
Notes:	Blue background denotes the winner of the electorate vote. Pink background denotes a candidate elected from their party list. Yellow background denotes an electorate win by a list member, or other incumbent. A ✓ or ✗ denotes status of any incumbent, win or lose respectively.						
Party	Candidate	Votes	%	±%	Party votes	%	±%
CDU	✓ Eckehard Kölbel	13,042	37.9	▲1.1	12,704	36.7	▲2.0
PDS		10,062	29.3	▲11.2	9,326	27.0	▲9.0
SPD		8,630	25.1	▲4.3	8,713	25.2	▲1.9
Greens		2,213	6.4	▼1.3	1,625	4.7	▼2.6
REP		430	1.3		374	1.1	
List-only parties					1,858	5.4	
Informal votes		931			708		
Total valid votes		34,377			34,600		
Turnout		35,308	72.0	▲5.1			
CDU hold	Majority	2,980	8.6	▼7.4			

=== 1990 election ===
State election (1990): Gera-Nord
Notes:	Blue background denotes the winner of the electorate vote. Pink background denotes a candidate elected from their party list. Yellow background denotes an electorate win by a list member, or other incumbent. A ✓ or ✗ denotes status of any incumbent, win or lose respectively.						
Party	Candidate	Votes	%	±%	Party votes	%	±%
CDU	Eckehard Kölbel	11,996	36.8		11,335	34.7	
SPD		6,765	20.8		7,609	23.3	
PDS		5,883	18.1		5,897	18.0	
Greens		2,522	7.7		2,398	7.3	
FDP		2,404	7.4		2,858	8.7	
DSU		1,858	5.7		1,550	4.7	
Independent		493	1.5				
DFD		357	1.1		261	0.8	
UFV		306	0.9		220	0.7	
List-only parties					579	1.8	
Informal votes		783			660		
Total valid votes		32,584			32,707		
Turnout		33,367	66.9				
CDU win new seat	Majority	5,231	16.0				
