= Erfurt IV =

Electoral constituency in the state of Thuringia, Germany

Erfurt IV is an electoral constituency (German: Wahlkreis) represented in the Landtag of Thuringia. It elects one member via first-past-the-post voting. Under the current constituency numbering system, it is designated as constituency 27. It contains southeastern parts of Erfurt, the capital and largest city of Thuringia.

Erfurt IV was created in 1990 for the first state election. Since 2024, it has been represented by Marek Erfurth of Alternative for Germany.

== Geography ==
As of the 2019 state election, Erfurt IV is located entirely within the urban district of Erfurt. It covers the central and southwestern part of the city, specifically the city districts (Stadtteile) of Büßleben, Daberstedt, Dittelstedt, Egstedt, Herrenberg, Melchendorf, Niedernissa, Rohda (Haarberg), Urbich, Waltersleben, Wiesenhügel, and Windischholzhausen.

== Members ==
The constituency was held by the Christian Democratic Union (CDU) from its creation in 1990 until 2004, during which time it was represented by Jörg Schwäblein. It was won by the Party of Democratic Socialism (PDS) in 2004, and represented by Tamara Thierbach. She was succeeded in from 2009-2024 by André Blechschmidt of The Left, successor party of the PDS. In 2024, Marek Erfurth of Alternative for Germany won the seat.

Election	Member	Party	%
1990	Jörg Schwäblein	CDU	35.0
1994	Jörg Schwäblein	CDU	34.3
1999	Jörg Schwäblein	CDU	42.5
2004	Tamara Thierbach	PDS	37.6
2009	André Blechschmidt	LINKE	32.9
2014	André Blechschmidt	LINKE	37.1
2019	André Blechschmidt	LINKE	32.2
2024	Marek Erfurth	AfD	26.7

== Election results ==
=== 2024 election ===
State election (2024): Erfurt IV
Notes:	Blue background denotes the winner of the electorate vote. Pink background denotes a candidate elected from their party list. Yellow background denotes an electorate win by a list member, or other incumbent. A ✓ or ✗ denotes status of any incumbent, win or lose respectively.						
Party	Candidate	Votes	%	±%	Party votes	%	±%
AfD	Marek Erfurth	6,836	26.7	▲5.7	6,699	26.1	▲6.7
CDU	Kristina Nordt	6,500	25.4	▲8.2	5,641	22.0	▲6.0
BSW	Thomas Schmid	3,918	15.3		4,344	16.9	
SPD	Cornelia Klisch	3,590	14.0	▼1.5	2,171	8.5	▼0.9
Left	Steffen Kachel	3,451	13.5	▼18.7	4,313	16.8	▼20.3
Greens	Renate Wanner-Hopp	559	2.2	▼4.5	1,035	4.0	▼2.5
FW	Henri Endter	393	1.5	▼0.4	243	0.9	
FDP	Stefan Carl	346	1.4	▼3.6	328	1.3	▼4.2
APT					290	1.1	Steady
Familie					167	0.7	
Pirates					133	0.5	▼0.1
Values					121	0.5	
BD					105	0.4	
ÖDP					53	0.2	▼0.2
MLPD					21	0.1	▼0.2
Informal votes		285			214		
Total valid votes		25,593			25,664		
Turnout		25,878	74.4	▲8.4			
AfD gain from Left	Majority	336	1.3				

=== 2019 election ===
State election (2019): Erfurt IV
Notes:	Blue background denotes the winner of the electorate vote. Pink background denotes a candidate elected from their party list. Yellow background denotes an electorate win by a list member, or other incumbent. A ✓ or ✗ denotes status of any incumbent, win or lose respectively.						
Party	Candidate	Votes	%	±%	Party votes	%	±%
Left	✓ André Blechschmidt	7,548	32.2	▲4.9	8,718	37.1	▲1.4
AfD	Stefan Möller	4,913	21.0		4,569	19.4	▲10.0
CDU	Regina Polster	4,038	17.2	▼10.4	3,769	16.0	▼8.8
SPD	Cornelia Klisch	3,638	15.5	▼4.3	2,215	9.4	▼4.5
Greens	Fabian Gabriel	1,567	6.7	▼0.1	1,522	6.5	▼0.8
FDP	Franziska Baum	1,159	5.0	▲2.6	1,295	5.5	▲2.9
Free Voters	Harald Neubacher	449	1.9				
MLPD	Sabine Dimler	98	0.4		72	0.3	
List-only parties					1,349	5.7	
Informal votes		377			277		
Total valid votes		23,409			23,509		
Turnout		23,786	66.0	▲11.4			
Left hold	Majority	2,635	11.2	▲1.7			

=== 2014 election ===
State election (2014): Erfurt IV
Notes:	Blue background denotes the winner of the electorate vote. Pink background denotes a candidate elected from their party list. Yellow background denotes an electorate win by a list member, or other incumbent. A ✓ or ✗ denotes status of any incumbent, win or lose respectively.						
Party	Candidate	Votes	%	±%	Party votes	%	±%
Left	✓ André Blechschmidt	7,214	37.1	▲4.2	7,003	35.7	▲3.5
CDU	Andreas Horn	5,378	27.6	▲3.6	4,883	24.9	▲1.0
SPD	Cornelia Klisch	3,849	19.8	▲0.6	2,730	12.9	▼5.5
AfD					1,854	9.4	
Greens	Dieter Lauinger	1,332	6.8	▼0.5	1,425	7.3	▼1.1
NPD	Enrico Biczysko	758	3.9	▲0.1	520	2.6	▼1.1
Pirates	Manfred Schubert	481	2.5		266	1.4	
FDP	Jutta Czifrik	458	2.4	▼3.6	510	2.6	▼4.2
List-only parties					441	2.2	
Informal votes		393			231		
Total valid votes		19,470			19,632		
Turnout		19,863	54.6	▼4.6			
Left hold	Majority	1,836	9.5	▲0.6			

=== 2009 election ===
State election (2009): Erfurt IV
Notes:	Blue background denotes the winner of the electorate vote. Pink background denotes a candidate elected from their party list. Yellow background denotes an electorate win by a list member, or other incumbent. A ✓ or ✗ denotes status of any incumbent, win or lose respectively.						
Party	Candidate	Votes	%	±%	Party votes	%	±%
Left	André Blechschmidt	7,146	32.9	▼4.7	7,022	32.2	▼2.8
CDU	Manfred Scherer	5,203	24.0	▼8.4	5,197	23.9	▼10.3
SPD	Frank Schalles	4,177	19.2	▲2.5	4,216	19.4	▲5.0
Greens	Rüdiger Bender	1,590	6.3	▲0.9	1,820	6.7	▲1.7
Free Voters	Heidrun Marie-Anna Höpfner	1,468	6.8		1,090	5.0	▲4.2
FDP	Birgit Schuster	1,298	6.0	▲1.9	1,491	6.8	▲3.4
NPD	Gabriele Bölke	831	3.8		812	3.7	▲2.7
List-only parties					138	0.6	
Informal votes		475			402		
Total valid votes		21,713			21,786		
Turnout		22,188	59.2	▲6.4			
Left hold	Majority	1,943	8.9	▲3.7			

=== 2004 election ===
State election (2004): Erfurt IV
Notes:	Blue background denotes the winner of the electorate vote. Pink background denotes a candidate elected from their party list. Yellow background denotes an electorate win by a list member, or other incumbent. A ✓ or ✗ denotes status of any incumbent, win or lose respectively.						
Party	Candidate	Votes	%	±%	Party votes	%	±%
PDS	Tamara Thierbach	7,179	37.6	▲7.4	6,755	35.0	▲6.2
CDU	✗ Jörg Schwäblein	6,183	32.4	▼10.1	6,598	34.2	▼12.4
SPD	Karin Dietrich	3,196	16.7	▼4.2	2,772	14.4	▼2.6
Greens	Matthias Zeng	1,227	6.4	▲3.5	1,297	6.7	▲4.1
FDP	Annett Pröhl	781	4.1	▲2.9	664	3.4	▲2.7
Independent	Jürgen Zerull	546	2.9				
List-only parties					1,229	6.4	
Informal votes		942			739		
Total valid votes		19,112			19,315		
Turnout		20,054	52.8	▼10.1			
PDS gain from CDU	Majority	996	5.2				

=== 1999 election ===
State election (1999): Erfurt IV
Notes:	Blue background denotes the winner of the electorate vote. Pink background denotes a candidate elected from their party list. Yellow background denotes an electorate win by a list member, or other incumbent. A ✓ or ✗ denotes status of any incumbent, win or lose respectively.						
Party	Candidate	Votes	%	±%	Party votes	%	±%
CDU	✓ Jörg Schwäblein	10,457	42.5	▲8.2	11,527	46.6	▲13.3
PDS	Tamara Thierbach	7,431	30.2	▲2.8	7,123	28.8	▲2.5
SPD	Otto Kretschmer	5,143	20.9	▼8.7	4,202	17.0	▼11.0
Greens	Jochen Kwast	714	2.9	▼4.8	643	2.6	▼2.8
REP	Günther Steinert	395	1.6	▲0.6	120	0.5	▼0.3
FDP	Herbert Rudovsky	293	1.2		168	0.7	▼1.8
DSU	Wolfgang Mayer	152	0.6		81	0.3	▲0.2
List-only parties					880	3.6	
Informal votes		367			208		
Total valid votes		24,585			24,744		
Turnout		24,952	62.9	▼12.4			
CDU hold	Majority	3,026	12.3	▲7.6			

=== 1994 election ===
State election (1994): Erfurt IV
Notes:	Blue background denotes the winner of the electorate vote. Pink background denotes a candidate elected from their party list. Yellow background denotes an electorate win by a list member, or other incumbent. A ✓ or ✗ denotes status of any incumbent, win or lose respectively.						
Party	Candidate	Votes	%	±%	Party votes	%	±%
CDU	✓ Jörg Schwäblein	10,425	34.3	▼0.7	10,199	33.3	▼1.0
SPD	Werner Griese	9,006	29.6	▲8.6	8,572	28.0	▲5.7
PDS	Tamara Thierbach	8,340	27.4	▲9.2	8,049	26.3	▲6.8
Greens	Katrin Göring-Eckardt	2,352	7.7	▼2.9	1,657	5.4	▼5.7
REP	F.-R. Kästner	290	1.0		244	0.8	▲0.4
List-only parties					1,904	6.2	
Informal votes		861			649		
Total valid votes		30,413			30,625		
Turnout		31,274	75.3	▲8.4			
CDU hold	Majority	1,419	4.7	▼9.3			

=== 1990 election ===
State election (1990): Erfurt IV
Notes:	Blue background denotes the winner of the electorate vote. Pink background denotes a candidate elected from their party list. Yellow background denotes an electorate win by a list member, or other incumbent. A ✓ or ✗ denotes status of any incumbent, win or lose respectively.						
Party	Candidate	Votes	%	±%	Party votes	%	±%
CDU	Jörg Schwäblein	9,226	35.0		9,103	34.3	
SPD		5,541	21.0		5,918	22.3	
PDS		4,793	18.2		5,182	19.5	
Greens		2,785	10.6		2,941	11.1	
FDP		2,175	8.2		2,226	8.4	
UFV		1,005	3.8		284	1.1	
DSU		843	3.2		504	1.9	
List-only parties					386	1.5	
Informal votes		628			452		
Total valid votes		26,368			26,544		
Turnout		26,996	66.9				
CDU win new seat	Majority	3,685	14.0				
