= Nina Behrendt =

German economist and politician

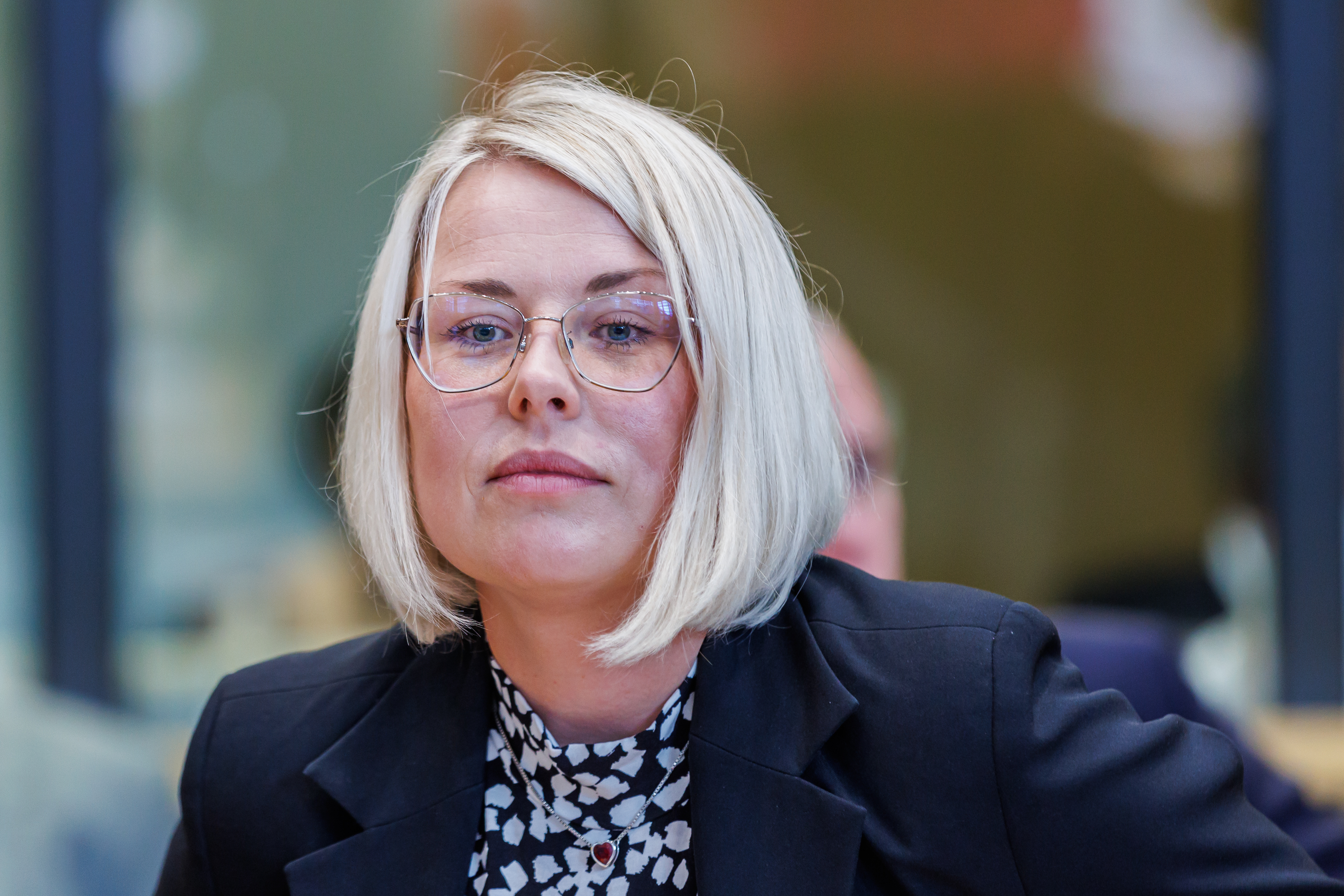
- Behrendt in 2024

Member of the Landtag of Thuringia
- Incumbent
- Assumed office 2024

Personal details
- Born: 1983 (age 42–43) Erfurt, East Germany
- Party: BSW (since 2024)

Nina Behrendt (born 1983) is a German business economist and politician from the Sahra Wagenknecht Alliance (BSW). Since 2024, she has been a member of the Landtag of Thuringia.

== Biography ==
Nina Behrendt is a business administrator and worked for over 25 years in the public sector, including in customer service at the Erfurt municipal utilities.

== Politics ==
Nina Behrendt was not politically active until 2024. In 2024, she joined the newly founded Sahra Wagenknecht Alliance and entered the 8th Thuringian state parliament in the 2024 Thuringian state election via 11th place on the state list.

Nina Behrendt is also an assessor on the state board of the BSW Thuringia.

== See also ==
- List of members of the Landtag of Thuringia (2024–present)
