= Lennart Geibert =

German politician (born 1997)

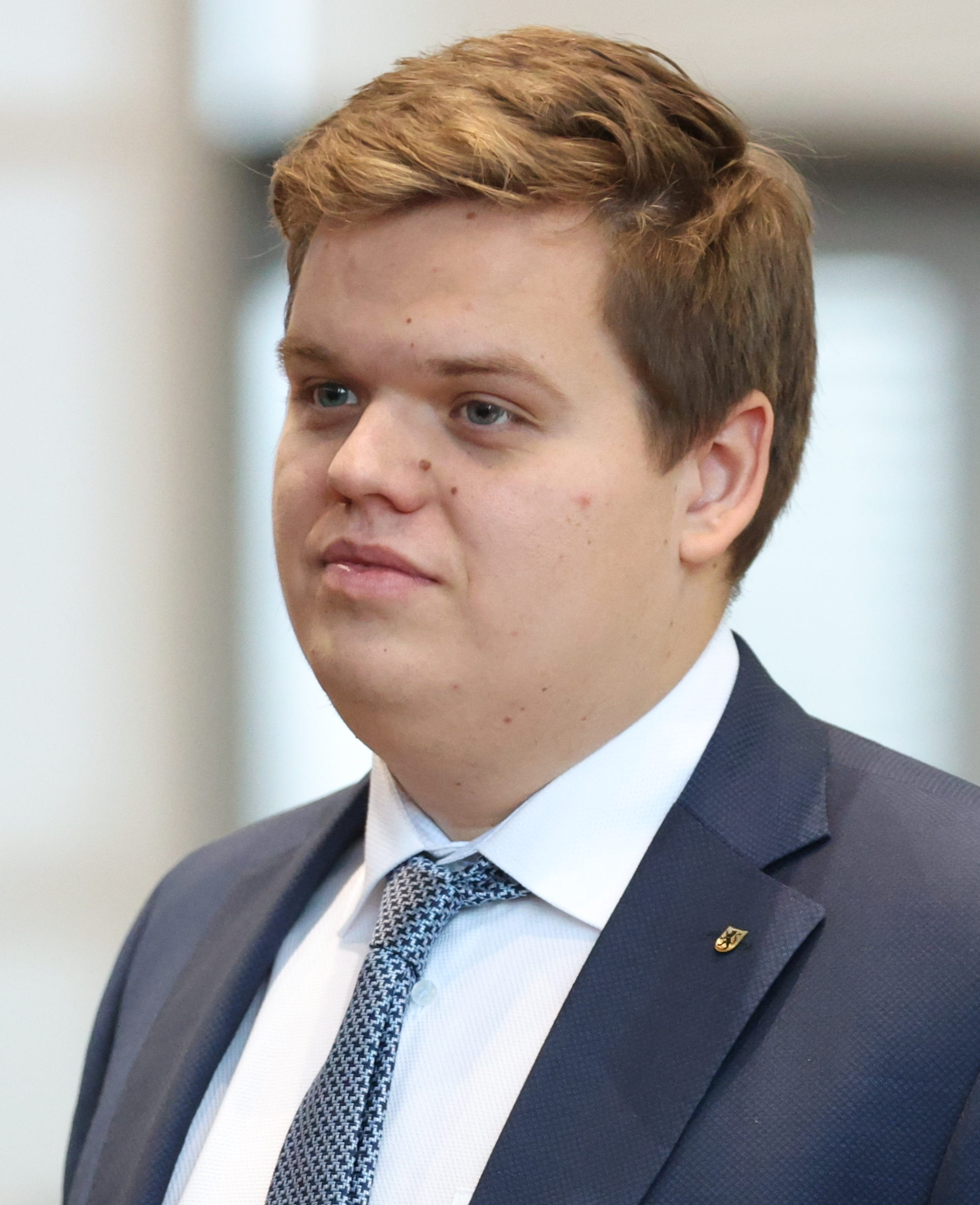
- Geibert in 2024

Member of the Landtag of Thuringia
- Incumbent
- Assumed office 28 September 2024

Personal details
- Born: 25 July 1997 (age 28)
- Party: Christian Democratic Union (since 2013)
- Parent: Jörg Geibert (father)

Lennart Geibert (born 25 July 1997) is a German politician serving as a member of the Landtag of Thuringia since 2024. He has served as chairman of the Young Union in Thuringia since 2023. He is the son of Jörg Geibert.
