= Linda Stark =

German politician (born 2001)

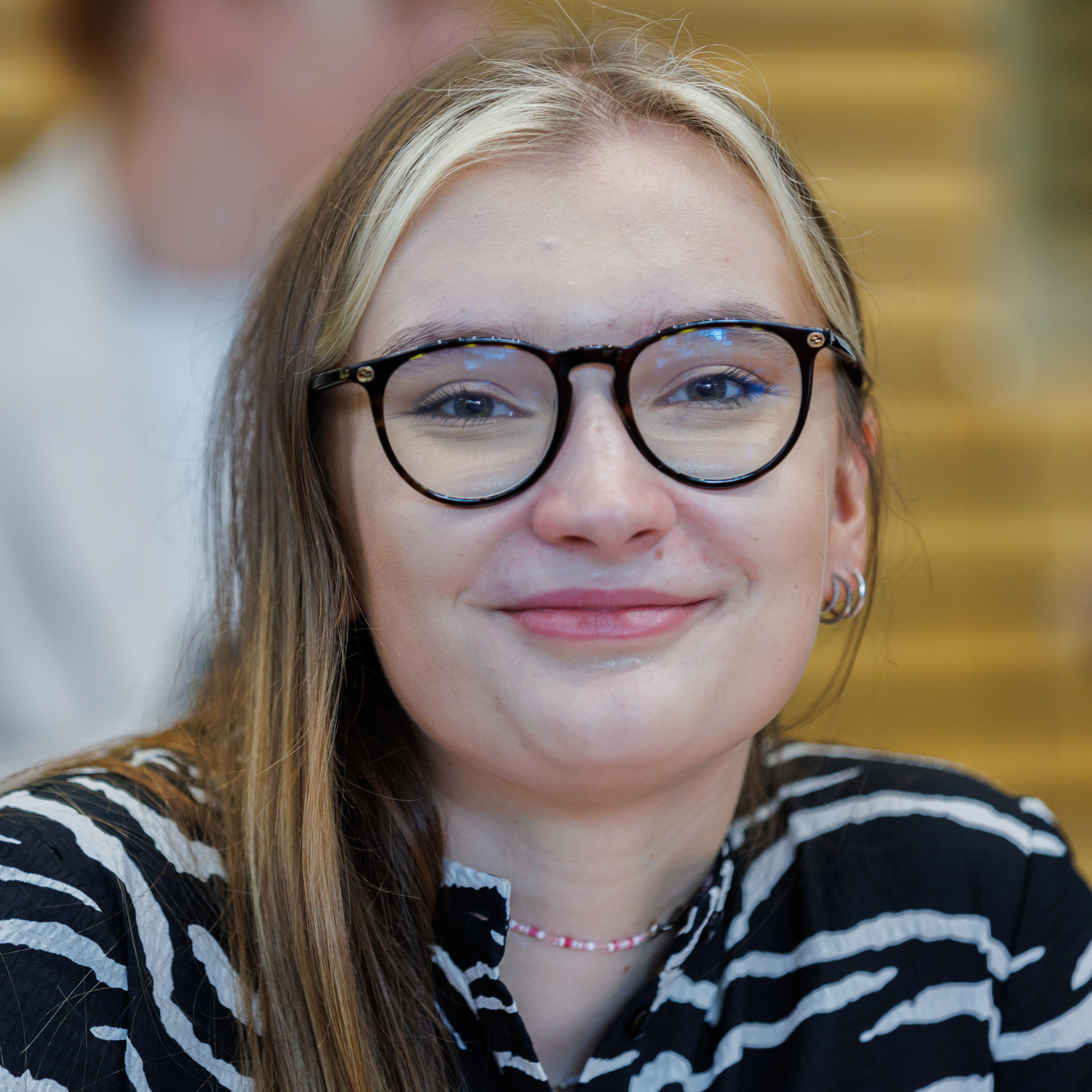
- Stark in 2024

Member of the Landtag of Thuringia
- Incumbent
- Assumed office 26 September 2024

Personal details
- Born: 24 May 2001 (age 25) Sonneberg
- Party: Die Linke (since 2019)

Linda Stark (born 24 May 2001) is a German politician serving as a member of the Landtag of Thuringia since 2024. She has been a district councillor of Sonneberg since 2024.
