= Madeleine Henfling =

German politician

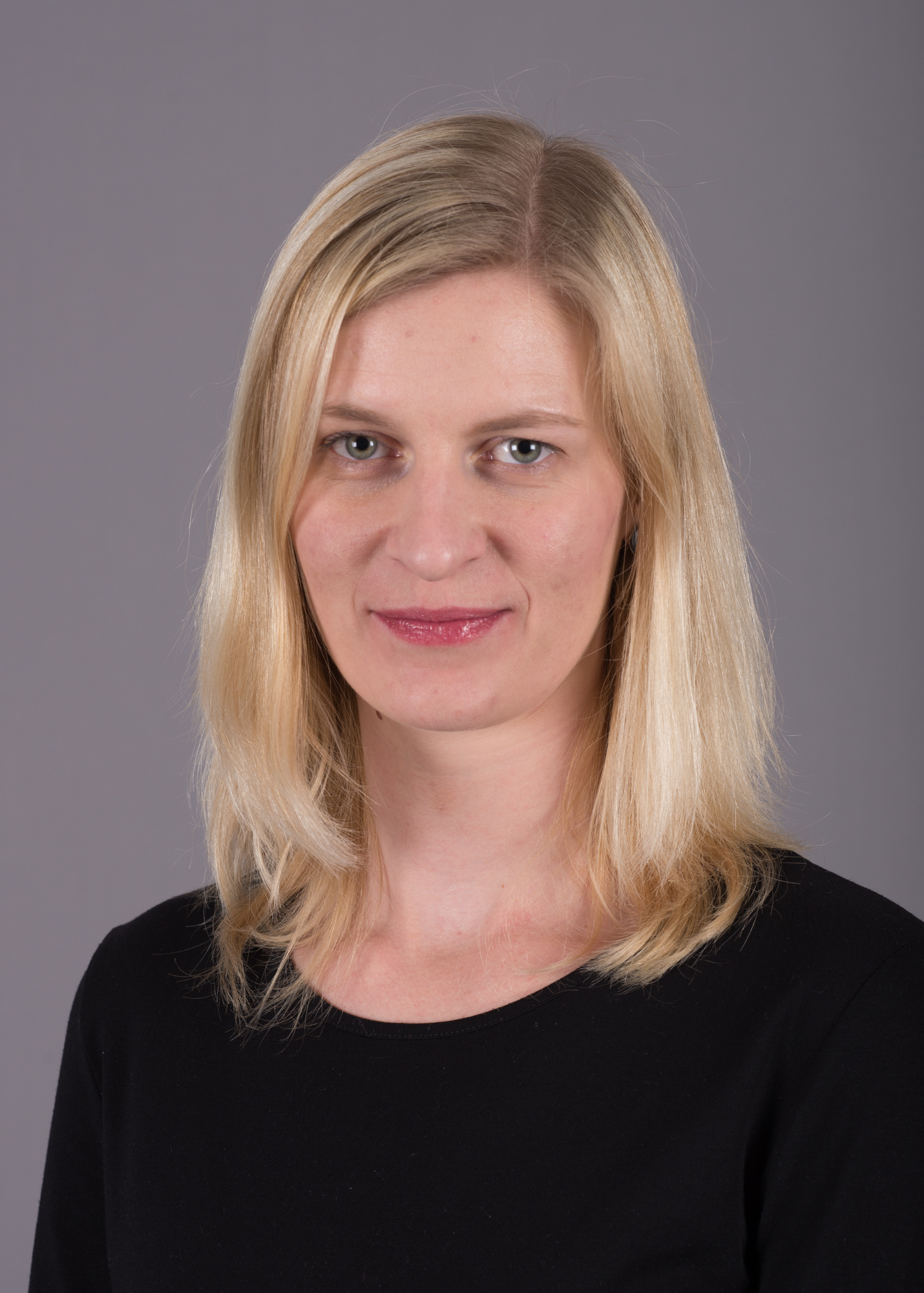

Member of the Landtag of Thuringia
- In office 2014–2024

Personal details
- Born: 11 April 1983 (age 42) Ilmenau, East Germany
- Party: Alliance 90/The Greens
- Children: 3

Madeleine Henfling (born 11 April 1983 in Ilmenau) is a German politician (Alliance 90/The Greens).

Between 2014 and 2024 she was an MP in the state parliament of Thuringia and between May 2020 and September 2024 Vice-president of the Landtag. She was the ‘Spitzenkandidat’ for the Alliance 90/The Greens during the 2024 Thuringa elections.

== Life ==
After graduating from high school, she studied history, African studies and Dutch linguistics at the University of Cologne and the University of Leiden from 2001 to 2008. In 2007, she joined Alliance 90/The Greens and was accepted in joining a trainee program in the party's federal association.

She became active for the party in Thuringia and was nominated as her party's direct candidate in the Ilm-Kreis I constituency for the 2009 state election. She received 5.1 percent of the vote.

At the end of November 2009, Madeleine Henfling and Dieter Lauinger were elected chairmen of the state association at the state party conference of the Thuringian Greens. Henfling, who ran unopposed, was elected with 78.9 percent of the vote. She has been a member of the Ilm district council since 2010. In the 2012 local elections, she ran for the office of district administrator in the Ilm district and received 4.6 percent of the vote.

In the 2014 and 2019 state elections, Henfling was elected a member of the Thuringian state parliament after coming fifth on her party's state list. Since March 2020 she has been the Parliamentary Managing Director of the Alliance 90/The Greens parliamentary group in the Thuringian state parliament.

Madeleine Henfling has been Vice President of the Thuringian State Parliament since May 2020.

Henfling is married and has three children.

She gained the greatest notoriety through a long dispute over childcare for politicians in 2023 and 2024. She brought her 5-month-old child with her to the state parliament session because she did not have anyone who could take care of her child, and was then excluded by the President of Parliament. A politically and legally secure dispute followed, which became widely known.
