= Christian Schaft =

German politician (born 1991)

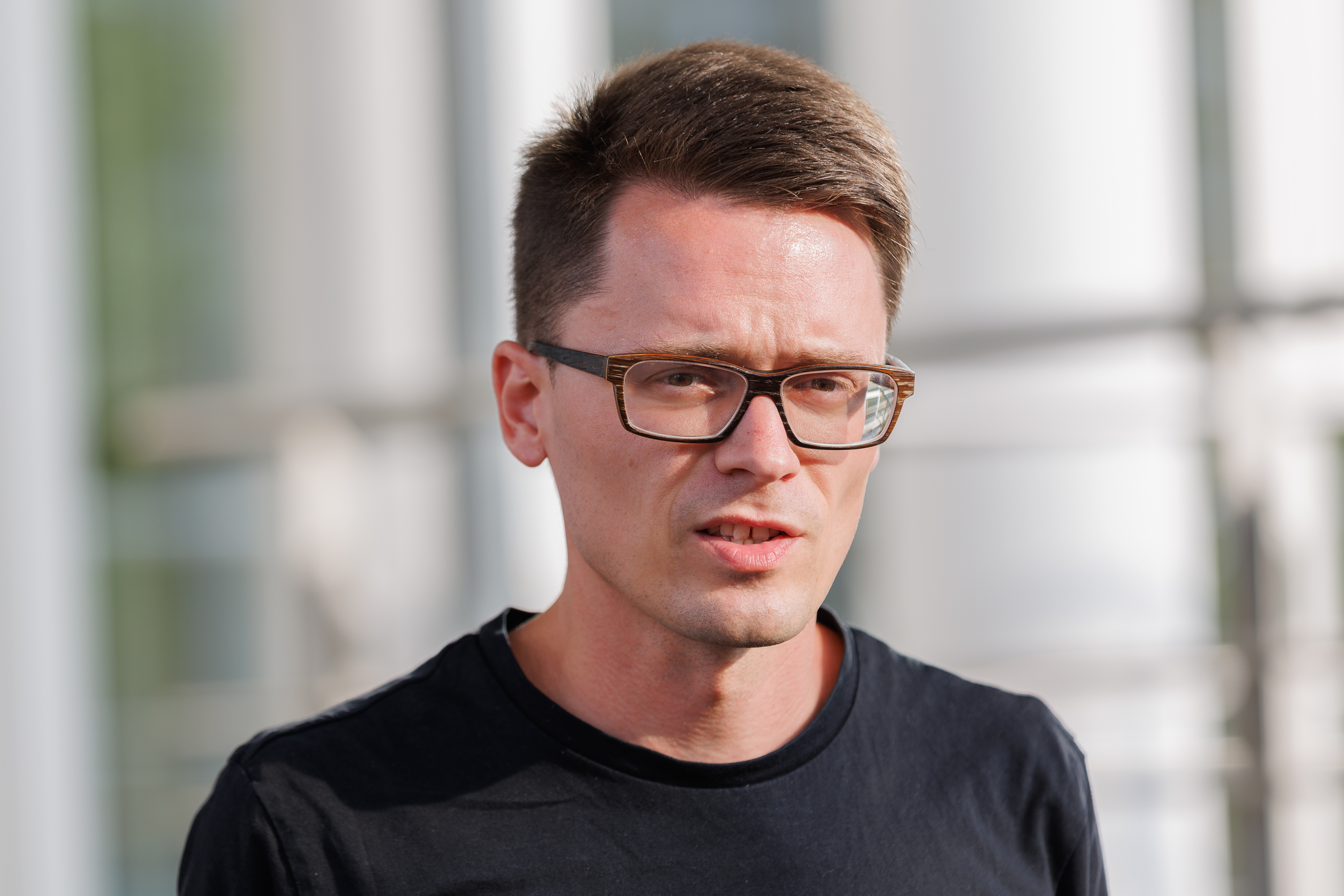
- Schaft in 2024

Member of the Landtag of Thuringia
- Incumbent
- Assumed office 14 October 2014

Personal details
- Born: 7 April 1991 (age 35) Bad Salzungen
- Party: Die Linke (since 2007)

Christian Schaft (born 7 April 1991 in Bad Salzungen) is a German politician serving as a member of the Landtag of Thuringia since 2014. He has served as group leader of Die Linke since 2024.
