= Action Party for Animal Welfare =

Minor political party in Germany

Action Party for Animal Welfare Aktion Partei für Tierschutz
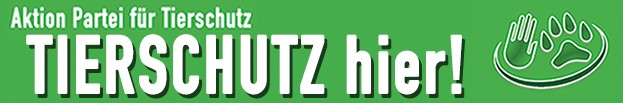
- Abbreviation: Tierschutz hier!
- Leader: Thomas Schwarz
- Founded: 28 February 2017
- Split from: TSP
- Membership: 414
- Ideology: Animal welfare
- Political position: Single-issue
- Bundestag: 0 / 709
- Bundesrat: 0 / 69
- State Parliaments: 0 / 1,884
- European Parliament: 0 / 96
- Düsseldorf City Council: 1 / 90

Website
- www.tierschutz-hier.de

The Action Party for Animal Welfare (German: Aktion Partei für Tierschutz, abbreviated APT) is a minor political party in Germany.

On 28 February 2017, the party was formed by independent candidates in the state of Düsseldorf under the name "Animal Protection List". The party leader is Thomas Schwarz, who was previously chairman of Human Environment Animal Protection Party (Tierschutzpartei).

== History ==
In 2017, individuals who had not previously been affiliated with any party came together to form a new party. On 28 February 2017, they founded the small party Aktion Partei für Tierschutz (Action Party for Animal Welfare) in Düsseldorf, with the short name Tierschutzliste (Animal Welfare List). The party was initiated by Jörg Balters and Thomas Schwarz, the latter being the former state chairman of North Rhine-Westphalia for the Partei Mensch Umwelt Tierschutz (Party for People Environment Animal Protection).

The party participated in the 2017 North Rhine-Westphalia state election, and received 0.7% of the vote (receiving 59,747 votes).

Between the end of 2017 and the beginning of 2019, the Saxony-Anhalt and North Rhine-Westphalia state associations were founded.

On 21 January 2018, a new federal executive committee was elected. Thomas Schwarz from Neuss became federal chairman, and Christine Bril from Lutherstadt Eisleben became deputy chairwoman. The name of the party was supplemented by – das Original (the original); the party states that this was done to better reflect that the party primarily stands for animal welfare, its original concern. The short name was changed from Tierschutzliste (Animal Welfare List) to Tierschutz hier! (Animal Welfare Here!).

The party ran in the 2019 European elections with independent Claudia Krüger (member of the Düsseldorf City Council) as its lead candidate. It received 0.3% of the vote. In 2020, the party won a seat in the Düsseldorf City Council with 1.4% of the vote. Also in 2020, the party would run a candidate for Mayor of Dusseldorf, receiving 1,939 votes and 0.8%. The party won 1.62% and one seat for Thomas Schwarz in Neuss, and 2.2% and two seats in Gelsenkirchen. In addition, the Unabhängige Wählergemeinschaft Tierschutz (Independent Voters' Association for Animal Welfare), supported by the party, won two seats on the Duisburg City Council with 1.86% of the vote, where it formed a parliamentary group with the Duisburg Alternative List (DAL). In Düsseldorf, a council group called Tierschutz/Freie Wähler was founded, chaired by Torsten Lemmer (Freie Wähler), who also worked as campaign manager for Tierschutz hier for the 2020 local elections. In Neuss, an agreement was announced on 13 September 2022 with Roland Sperling of Die Linke to form a parliamentary group called Linke/Tierschutz in the city council.

The party did not participate in the 2021 federal election.

In the 2024 European parliament elections, the party received 0.4% of the national vote (173,443 votes in total).

In the 2024 Saxony state election, the party managed to get 1% and thus got more votes than the Free Democratic Party. Similarly, in the Thuringian state election, they also got exactly 1% of the vote.

== Ideology and platform ==
According to its basic manifesto, the central goals of the party include a complete ban on animal testing, a legal protection status for animals that can be enforced by representatives, and the establishment of a state animal protection police force. The party also calls for tax relief for organic farmers, a ban on fur farms in Germany and the import of animal fur. For animal protection purposes, the party believes circus companies should no longer be allowed to bring wild animals and that ritual slaughter should be banned without religious exceptions. The party also supports more education on animal protection in schools, and the greater use of renewable energies in Germany. It advocates a legal obligation to produce food from organic farming. Dressage is to be prohibited, and zoos and animal parks are to be more strictly regulated.

== Election results ==
=== European Parliament ===
| Election | List leader | Votes | % | Seats | +/– | EP Group |
|---|---|---|---|---|---|---|
| 2019 | Claudia Krüger | 99,780 | 0.27 (#17) | 0 / 96 | New | – |
| 2024 | Cornelia Keisel | 173,443 | 0.44 (#17) | 0 / 96 | 0 | – |

== Organisation ==
=== Current federal executive committee ===
| Office | Name | Start of term of office |
|---|---|---|
| Federal Chair | Thomas Schwarz | 5 February 2021 |
| Deputy Chair | Christine Bril | 28 February 2017 |
| Federal Treasurer | Ben Hammouda Touaibia | 5 February 2021 |
| Federal Secretary | Jessica Westerteicher | 5 February 2021 |

== Federal chair ==
- Santano Traber (2017)
- Thomas Schwarz (2017–2019, since 2021)
- Rudi Görg (since 2019–2021)

| Federal state | State chairperson | Results of last state election |
|---|---|---|
| Hamburg | Maike Drewes | - |
| North Rhine-Westphalia | Walter Hermanns | 0.7% (2017) |
| Saxony-Anhalt | Christine Bril | 0.6% (2021) |
| Schleswig-Holstein | Diana Kehrer until 2021 | - |
| Thuringia | Andi Biernatkowski | 1.1% (2019) |

== Relationship with the Tierschutzpartei ==
The founding of the Aktion Partei für Tierschutz was preceded in early 2017 by a dispute within the Partei Mensch Umwelt Tierschutz's state association in North Rhine-Westphalia. The dispute concerned procedural errors in the re-election of Thomas Schwarz as regional chairman, a dispute over the party's participation in the 2017 state elections, and the influence of non-member Torsten Lemmer as managing director of the party's parliamentary group in Düsseldorf.

The party does not consider itself a splinter group of the Partei Mensch Umwelt Tierschutz (abbreviated to Tierschutzpartei).
