= Suhl – Schmalkalden-Meiningen IV =

Electoral constituency represented in the Landtag of Thuringia

Suhl – Schmalkalden-Meiningen IV is an electoral constituency (German: Wahlkreis) represented in the Landtag of Thuringia. It elects one member via first-past-the-post voting. Under the current constituency numbering system, it is designated as constituency 21. It covers the urban district of Suhl and a small part of Schmalkalden-Meiningen.

Suhl – Schmalkalden-Meiningen IV was created for the 1994 state election, replacing the constituency of Suhl, which covered only the city of Suhl. Originally named Suhl – Schmalkalden-Meiningen III, it was given its current name in 2014. Since 2024, it has been represented by Thomas Luhn of Alternative for Germany (AfD).

== Geography ==
As of the 2019 state election, Suhl – Schmalkalden-Meiningen IV covers the urban district of Suhl (excluding Gehlberg and Schmiedefeld am Rennsteig) and a small part of Schmalkalden-Meiningen, specifically the municipalities of Oberhof and Zella-Mehlis (excluding Benshausen).

== Members ==
The constituency was held by the Christian Democratic Union (CDU) from its creation in 1994 until 2004. Its first representative was Werner Ulbrich, who served from 1994 to 1999, followed by Wolfgang Wehner (1999–2004). It was won by the Party of Democratic Socialism in 2004, and represented by Ina Leukefeld. She was re-elected as a candidate for The Left in 2009 and 2014, and the seat was then held by Philipp Weltzien of The Left in 2019. In 2024, Thomas Luhn of Alternative for Germany won the seat.

| Election | Member | Party | % |
|---|---|---|---|
| 1994 | Werner Ulbrich | CDU | 36.0 |
| 1999 | Wolfgang Wehner | CDU | 43.8 |
| 2004 | Ina Leukefeld | PDS | 42.6 |
| 2009 | Ina Leukefeld | LINKE | 39.4 |
| 2014 | Ina Leukefeld | LINKE | 40.7 |
| 2019 | Philipp Weltzien | LINKE | 30.7 |
| 2024 | Thomas Luhn | AfD | 32.8 |

== Election results ==
=== 2024 election ===
State election (2024): Suhl – Schmalkalden-Meiningen IV
| Notes: | Blue background denotes the winner of the electorate vote. Pink background denotes a candidate elected from their party list. Yellow background denotes an electorate win by a list member, or other incumbent. A ✓ or ✗ denotes status of any incumbent, win or lose respectively. | | | | | | |
| Party | Candidate | Votes | % | ±% | Party votes | % | ±% |
|---|---|---|---|---|---|---|---|
| AfD | Thomas Luhn | 9,332 | 32.8 | ▲12.5 | 9,384 | 32.9 | ▲13.3 |
| CDU | Lars Jähne | 7,521 | 26.5 | ▼0.6 | 6,496 | 22.8 | ▲2.1 |
| BSW | Steffi Eschrich | 5,204 | 18.3 | | 5,638 | 19.8 | |
| Left | ✗ Philipp Weltzien | 3,096 | 10.9 | ▼19.8 | 3,691 | 12.9 | ▼26.2 |
| SPD | Diana Lehmann | 1,817 | 6.4 | ▼4.7 | 1,433 | 5.0 | ▼2.5 |
| FW | Michael Student | 716 | 2.5 | | 405 | 1.4 | |
| FDP | Andreas Schmidt | 408 | 1.4 | ▼2.3 | 309 | 1.1 | ▼2.6 |
| Greens | Manfred Kroeber | 333 | 1.2 | ▼5.6 | 444 | 1.6 | ▼2.9 |
| APT | | | | | 266 | 0.9 | ▼0.3 |
| Values | | | | | 124 | 0.4 | |
| BD | | | | | 102 | 0.4 | |
| Familie | | | | | 102 | 0.4 | |
| Pirates | | | | | 71 | 0.2 | ▼0.2 |
| ÖDP | | | | | 45 | 0.2 | ▼0.2 |
| MLPD | | | | | 18 | 0.1 | ▼0.2 |
| Informal votes | | 317 | | | 216 | | |
| Total valid votes | | 28,427 | | | 28,528 | | |
| Turnout | | 28,744 | 72.4 | ▲9.7 | | | |
| AfD gain from Left | Majority | 1,811 | 6.3 | | | | |

=== 2019 election ===
State election (2019): Suhl – Schmalkalden-Meiningen IV
| Notes: | Blue background denotes the winner of the electorate vote. Pink background denotes a candidate elected from their party list. Yellow background denotes an electorate win by a list member, or other incumbent. A ✓ or ✗ denotes status of any incumbent, win or lose respectively. | | | | | | |
| Party | Candidate | Votes | % | ±% | Party votes | % | ±% |
|---|---|---|---|---|---|---|---|
| Left | Philipp Weltzien | 7,371 | 30.7 | ▼10.0 | 9,431 | 39.1 | ▲3.4 |
| CDU | Marcus Kalkhake | 6,521 | 27.1 | ▼2.4 | 4,986 | 20.7 | ▼7.8 |
| AfD | Martina Stier | 4,876 | 20.3 | | 4,736 | 19.6 | ▲8.9 |
| SPD | Diana Lehmann | 2,663 | 11.1 | ▲1.0 | 1,816 | 7.5 | ▼3.2 |
| Greens | Tobias Lemme | 1,627 | 6.8 | ▲3.0 | 1,097 | 4.5 | ▼0.1 |
| FDP | Holger Holland | 878 | 3.7 | ▲1.9 | 901 | 3.7 | ▲2.0 |
| MLPD | Detlef Muselmann | 90 | 0.4 | | 62 | 0.3 | |
| List-only parties | | | | | 1,095 | 4.5 | |
| Informal votes | | 362 | | | 264 | | |
| Total valid votes | | 24,026 | | | 24,124 | | |
| Turnout | | 24,388 | 62.7 | ▲11.0 | | | |
| Left hold | Majority | 850 | 3.6 | ▼7.6 | | | |

=== 2014 election ===
State election (2014): Suhl – Schmalkalden-Meiningen IV
| Notes: | Blue background denotes the winner of the electorate vote. Pink background denotes a candidate elected from their party list. Yellow background denotes an electorate win by a list member, or other incumbent. A ✓ or ✗ denotes status of any incumbent, win or lose respectively. | | | | | | |
| Party | Candidate | Votes | % | ±% | Party votes | % | ±% |
|---|---|---|---|---|---|---|---|
| Left | ✓ Ina Leukefeld | 8,678 | 40.7 | ▲1.3 | 7,654 | 35.7 | ▼0.7 |
| CDU | Wolfgang Voß | 6,306 | 29.5 | ▲4.6 | 6,110 | 28.5 | ▲2.8 |
| SPD | Diana Lehmann | 2,160 | 10.1 | ▼2.2 | 2,302 | 10.7 | ▼5.2 |
| AfD | | | | | 2,287 | 10.7 | |
| Free Voters | Christian Scharfenberg | 1,802 | 8.4 | ▼0.1 | 670 | 3.1 | ▼1.8 |
| NPD | Philipp Stöcklein | 1,211 | 5.7 | ▲2.0 | 774 | 3.6 | 0.0 |
| Greens | Alexander Keiner | 815 | 3.8 | ▼1.1 | 981 | 4.6 | ▼1.2 |
| FDP | Matthias Kaiser | 376 | 1.8 | ▼4.5 | 357 | 1.7 | ▼5.4 |
| List-only parties | | | | | 328 | 1.5 | |
| Informal votes | | 400 | | | 285 | | |
| Total valid votes | | 21,348 | | | 21,463 | | |
| Turnout | | 21,748 | 51.7 | ▼3.6 | | | |
| Left hold | Majority | 2,372 | 11.2 | ▼3.3 | | | |

=== 2009 election ===
State election (2009): Suhl – Schmalkalden-Meiningen IV
| Notes: | Blue background denotes the winner of the electorate vote. Pink background denotes a candidate elected from their party list. Yellow background denotes an electorate win by a list member, or other incumbent. A ✓ or ✗ denotes status of any incumbent, win or lose respectively. | | | | | | |
| Party | Candidate | Votes | % | ±% | Party votes | % | ±% |
|---|---|---|---|---|---|---|---|
| Left | ✓ Ina Leukefeld | 9,760 | 39.4 | ▼3.2 | 9,040 | 36.4 | ▲2.9 |
| CDU | Wolfgang Wehner | 6,175 | 24.9 | ▼8.6 | 6,396 | 25.7 | ▼8.8 |
| SPD | Thomas Schmidt | 3,039 | 12.3 | ▼5.1 | 3,941 | 15.9 | ▲1.7 |
| Free Voters | Manfred Hardt | 2,118 | 8.5 | | 1,212 | 4.9 | ▼0.2 |
| FDP | Bejamin Honauer | 1,568 | 6.3 | ▼0.2 | 1,765 | 7.1 | ▲3.4 |
| Greens | Ludger Kanngießer | 1,205 | 4.9 | | 1,434 | 5.8 | ▲1.9 |
| NPD | Kurt Hoppe | 922 | 3.7 | | 895 | 3.6 | ▲2.1 |
| List-only parties | | | | | 170 | 0.7 | |
| Informal votes | | 418 | | | 352 | | |
| Total valid votes | | 24,787 | | | 24,853 | | |
| Turnout | | 25,205 | 55.3 | ▲3.9 | | | |
| Left hold | Majority | 3,585 | 14.5 | ▲5.4 | | | |

=== 2004 election ===
State election (2004): Suhl – Schmalkalden-Meiningen IV
| Notes: | Blue background denotes the winner of the electorate vote. Pink background denotes a candidate elected from their party list. Yellow background denotes an electorate win by a list member, or other incumbent. A ✓ or ✗ denotes status of any incumbent, win or lose respectively. | | | | | | |
| Party | Candidate | Votes | % | ±% | Party votes | % | ±% |
|---|---|---|---|---|---|---|---|
| PDS | Ina Leukefeld | 10,070 | 42.6 | ▲8.3 | 8,104 | 33.5 | ▲3.5 |
| CDU | ✗ Wolfgang Wehner | 7,935 | 33.5 | ▼10.3 | 8,346 | 34.5 | ▼12.9 |
| SPD | Matthias Griebel | 4,114 | 17.4 | ▲2.1 | 3,441 | 14.2 | ▼1.7 |
| FDP | Ilka Brückner | 1,541 | 6.5 | ▲3.2 | 896 | 3.7 | ▲2.9 |
| List-only parties | | | | | 3,415 | 14.1 | |
| Informal votes | | 1,355 | | | 813 | | |
| Total valid votes | | 23,660 | | | 24,202 | | |
| Turnout | | 25,015 | 51.4 | ▼6.6 | | | |
| PDS gain from CDU | Majority | 2,135 | 9.1 | | | | |

=== 1999 election ===
State election (1999): Suhl – Schmalkalden-Meiningen IV
| Notes: | Blue background denotes the winner of the electorate vote. Pink background denotes a candidate elected from their party list. Yellow background denotes an electorate win by a list member, or other incumbent. A ✓ or ✗ denotes status of any incumbent, win or lose respectively. | | | | | | |
| Party | Candidate | Votes | % | ±% | Party votes | % | ±% |
|---|---|---|---|---|---|---|---|
| CDU | Wolfgang Wehner | 12,954 | 43.8 | ▲7.8 | 14,110 | 47.4 | ▲10.9 |
| PDS | Gabi Zimmer | 10,143 | 34.3 | ▲5.8 | 8,922 | 30.0 | ▲2.8 |
| SPD | Klaus Goedecke | 4,531 | 15.3 | ▼7.7 | 4,726 | 15.9 | ▼8.6 |
| FDP | Eberhardt Lesser | 966 | 3.3 | ▲0.9 | 246 | 0.8 | ▼1.8 |
| Greens | Simone Maaß | 559 | 1.9 | ▼2.7 | 474 | 1.6 | ▼1.9 |
| REP | Sören Herrmann | 456 | 1.5 | ▲0.4 | 94 | 0.3 | ▼0.8 |
| List-only parties | | | | | 1,169 | 3.9 | |
| Informal votes | | 403 | | | 271 | | |
| Total valid votes | | 29,609 | | | 29,741 | | |
| Turnout | | 30,012 | 58.0 | ▼16.5 | | | |
| CDU hold | Majority | 2,811 | 9.5 | ▲2.0 | | | |

=== 1994 election ===
State election (1994): Suhl – Schmalkalden-Meiningen IV
| Notes: | Blue background denotes the winner of the electorate vote. Pink background denotes a candidate elected from their party list. Yellow background denotes an electorate win by a list member, or other incumbent. A ✓ or ✗ denotes status of any incumbent, win or lose respectively. | | | | | | |
| Party | Candidate | Votes | % | ±% | Party votes | % | ±% |
|---|---|---|---|---|---|---|---|
| CDU | Werner Ulbrich | 14,134 | 36.0 | | 14,346 | 36.5 | |
| PDS | | 11,175 | 28.5 | | 10,679 | 27.2 | |
| SPD | | 9,042 | 23.0 | | 9,643 | 24.5 | |
| Greens | | 1,788 | 4.6 | | 1,749 | 4.5 | |
| New Forum | | 1,736 | 4.4 | | 1,003 | 2.6 | |
| FDP | | 923 | 2.4 | | 1,040 | 2.6 | |
| REP | | 449 | 1.1 | | 435 | 1.1 | |
| List-only parties | | | | | 403 | 1.0 | |
| Informal votes | | 856 | | | 807 | | |
| Total valid votes | | 39,247 | | | 39,296 | | |
| Turnout | | 40,103 | 74.5 | | | | |
| CDU win new seat | Majority | 2,959 | 7.5 | | | | |
