= Tiefensee =

Tiefensee is a German surname. Notable people with the surname include:

- Roger Tiefensee (born 1967), Swedish politician
- Siegfried Tiefensee (1922–2009), German musician and conductor
- Wolfgang Tiefensee (born 1955), German politician
