= Wolfgang Tiefensee =

German politician (born 1955)

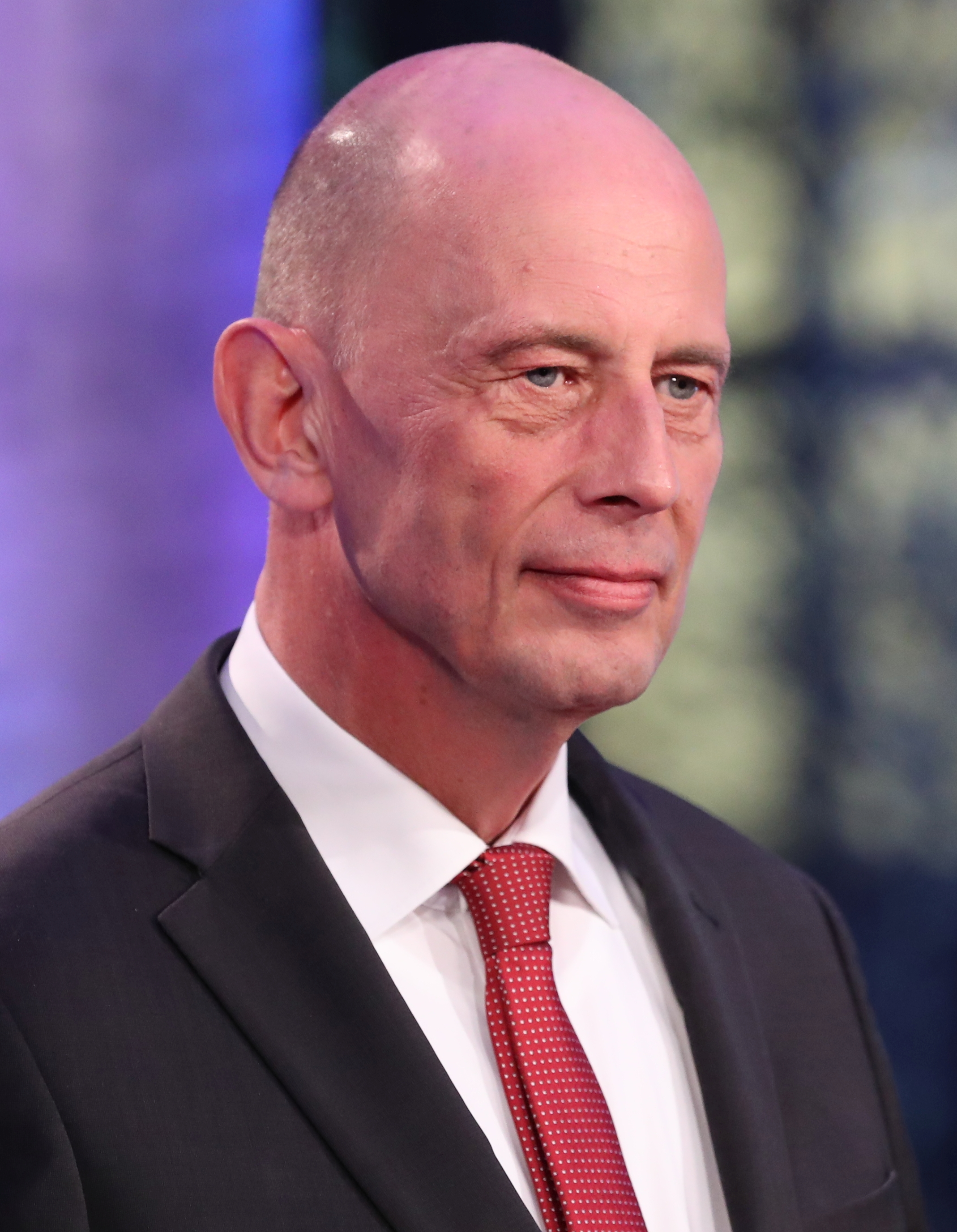

Minister of Economics, Science and Digital Society of Thuringia
- Incumbent
- Assumed office 4 March 2020
- Minister President: Bodo Ramelow
- Preceded by: Himself
- In office 5 December 2014 – 5 February 2020
- Minister President: Bodo Ramelow
- Preceded by: Uwe Höhn
- Succeeded by: Himself

Deputy Minister President of Thuringia
- In office 4 March 2020 – 31 August 2021
- Minister President: Bodo Ramelow
- Preceded by: Heike Taubert
- Succeeded by: Georg Maier

Leader of the Social Democratic Party in Thuringia
- In office 11 March 2018 – 26 September 2020
- Deputy: Antje Hochwind; Diana Lehmann; Cornelia Klisch; Sven Schrade
- Preceded by: Andreas Bausewein
- Succeeded by: Georg Maier

Federal Minister of Transport, Building and Urban Affairs
- In office 22 November 2005 – 27 October 2009
- Chancellor: Angela Merkel
- Preceded by: Manfred Stolpe
- Succeeded by: Peter Ramsauer

Mayor of Leipzig
- In office 1 July 1998 – 22 November 2005
- Preceded by: Hinrich Lehmann-Grube
- Succeeded by: Burkhard Jung

Member of the Landtag of Thuringia
- In office 26 November 2019 – 4 December 2019
- Succeeded by: Thomas Hartung
- Constituency: Social Democratic List

Member of the Bundestag for Saxony
- In office 27 October 2009 – 11 December 2014
- Succeeded by: Detlef Müller
- Constituency: Social Democratic List

Personal details
- Born: 4 January 1955 (age 71) Gera, East Germany
- Party: SPD
- Profession: Engineer
- Website: wolfgang-tiefensee.de

Wolfgang Tiefensee (born 4 January 1955) is a German politician of the Social Democratic Party (SPD). He was the Federal Minister for Transport, Building and Urban Development in the grand coalition cabinet led by Angela Merkel between 2005 and 2009. Since 2014, he has been the State Minister of Economy, Science and the Digital Society in the government of Thuringia's Minister-President Bodo Ramelow.

== Career ==
Originally an electrical engineer, Tiefensee turned to politics in 1989, during the democratization process of the German Democratic Republic. He became a member of the SPD in 1995.

=== Mayor of Leipzig, 1998–2005 ===
Tiefensee was elected mayor of Leipzig in 1998, and was re-elected with 67.1% of the vote in April 2005. Before 2005, he declined offers of a position in the federal government, stating his place was in Leipzig.

As mayor, he put great effort into Leipzig's bid to host the 2012 Olympic Games. While Leipzig unexpectedly won the campaign to tender the German bid, the middle-sized city did not get past the first round of the international competition, which was in fact won by London.

In 2002, Tiefensee was part of the 15-member commission that developed the so-called Hartz reforms, a set of recommendations to reform the German labour market as part of chancellor Gerhard Schröder’s Agenda 2010. Later that year, following the 2002 federal elections, he declined Schröder’s offer to join his government.

=== Role in national politics ===
In 2007, Tiefensee chaired talks following which EU transport ministers agreed unanimously to end talks with a private consortium contracted to develop the Galileo satellite navigation system and to spend €2.4 billion ($3.2 billion) to build it themselves instead.

Also during his tenure as Germany's transport minister, Tiefensee announced the little-known architect Francesco Stella as the winner of a competition to find an architectural design for the controversial reconstruction of the Berlin Stadtschloss in 2008.

In 2012, Tiefensee succeeded Garrelt Duin as spokesperson of the SPD parliamentary group on economic affairs. In the negotiations to form a Grand Coalition of chancellor Angela Merkel's Christian Democrats (CDU together with the Bavarian CSU) and the SPD following the 2013 federal elections, he was part of the SPD delegation in the working group on economic policy, led by Ilse Aigner and Hubertus Heil.

=== Career in state politics ===
Tiefensee resigned from his seat in parliament when he became State Minister of Economy, Science and the Digital Society in the government of Thuringia's Minister-President Bodo Ramelow in 2014. As one of the state's representatives at the Bundesrat, he serves on the Committee on Cultural Affairs and on the Committee on Economic Affairs.

In early 2018, Tiefensee was elected chairman of the SPD in Thuringia, succeeding Andreas Bausewein. He was confirmed in the November 2018 party conference.

In May 2020, Tiefensee announced that he would not stand in the next Thuringian state election but instead resign from active politics by the end of the parliamentary term.

== Other activities ==
=== Regulatory agencies ===
- Federal Network Agency for Electricity, Gas, Telecommunications, Post and Railway (BNetzA), Alternate Member of the Advisory Board (2009-2013), Member of the Advisory Board (since 2014)

=== Corporate boards ===
- Germany Trade and Invest (GTAI), Member of the Supervisory Board
- Thüringer Aufbaubank (TAB), Ex-Officio Chairman of the Supervisory Board (since 2014)
- Landesentwicklungsgesellschaft Thüringen (LEG), Ex-Officio Chairman of the Supervisory Board (since 2014)
- Carl Zeiss Foundation, Ex-Officio Member of the Board (since 2014)
- KfW, Ex-Officio Member of the Supervisory Board (2005-2009)

=== Non-profit organizations ===
- Business Forum of the Social Democratic Party of Germany, Member of the Political Advisory Board (since 2018)
- Friedrich Ebert Foundation (FES), Member of the Board of Trustees
- Gegen Vergessen – Für Demokratie, Chairman (since 2012)
- German Association for Small and Medium-Sized Businesses (BVMW), Member of the Political Advisory Board
- Institute for Germany Studies (IDF), Ruhr University Bochum, Member of the Board of Trustees
- Wittenberg Center for Global Ethics, Member of the Board of Trustees
- Sepsis-Stiftung, Member of the Board of Trustees
- German Association for Small and Medium-Sized Businesses (BVMW), Member of the Political Advisory Board (2009-2015)

== Personal life ==
Tiefensee, whose father was the musician and conductor Siegfried Tiefensee, is also known for playing the cello, a talent that he successfully incorporated into Leipzig's Olympic bid. His brother, Eberhard Tiefensee, is a Catholic priest and was professor of theology at the University of Erfurt from 1997 to 2018.
