= Steppuhn =

Steppuhn is a Germanized Lithuanian family name, originating from East Prussia. Notable people with the surname include

- Albrecht Steppuhn (1877–1955), German general
- Aloys Steppuhn (born 1950), German politician (Christian Democratic Union (CDU))
- Andreas Steppuhn (born 1962), German politician (Social Democratic Party of Germany (SPD))
- Elisabet Boehm or Elisabet Steppuhn (1859–1943), German feminist and writer
- Friedrich Steppuhn, birth name of Fyodor Stepun (1884–1965), Russian-German writer, philosopher, historian and sociologist
- Hermann Steppuhn (1827-1907), German landowner and member of the Reichstag, father of Elisabet Boehm.
