= Kętrzyn =

Town in Warmian-Masurian Voivodeship, Poland

Kętrzyn Rastembork
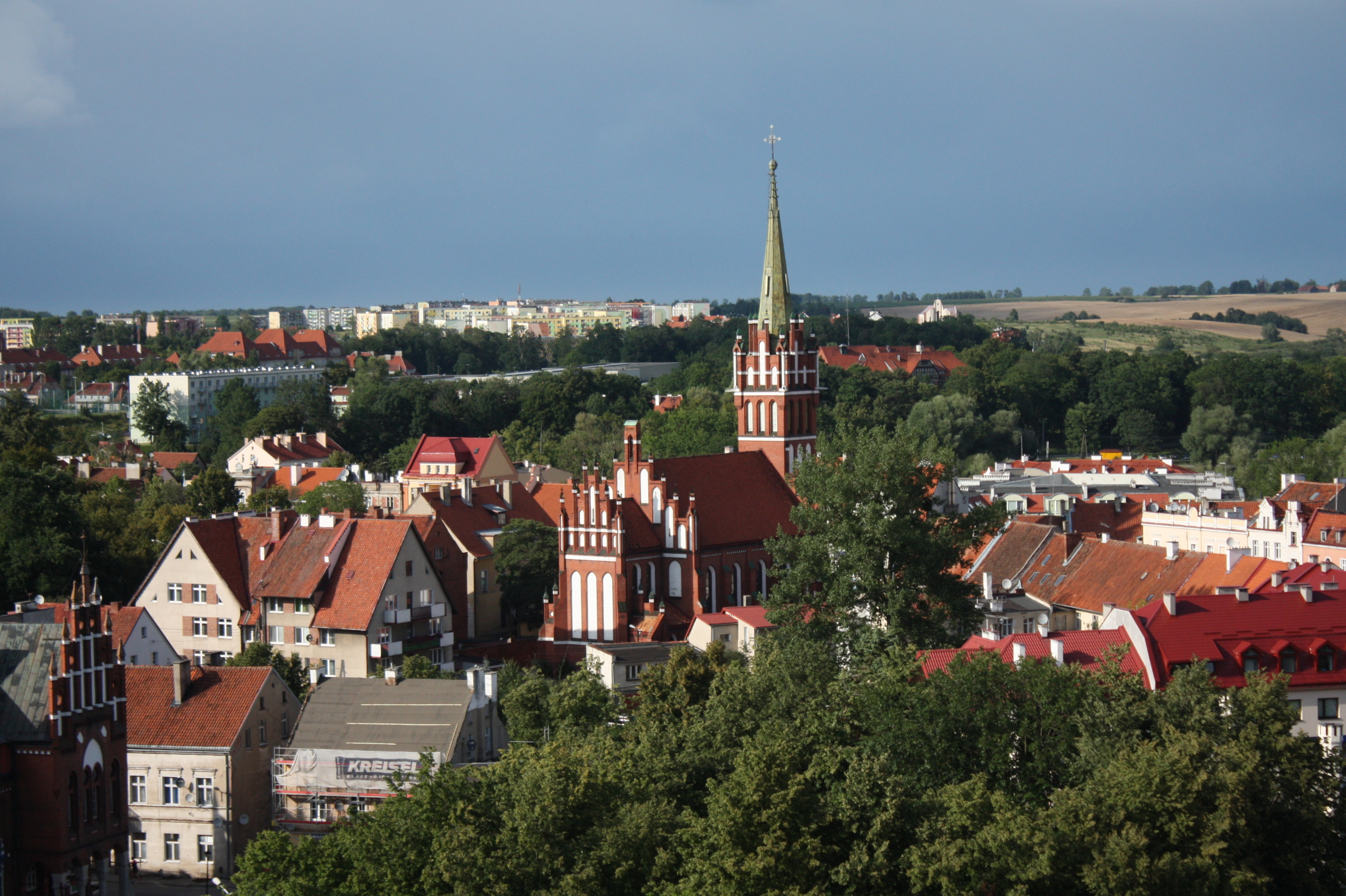
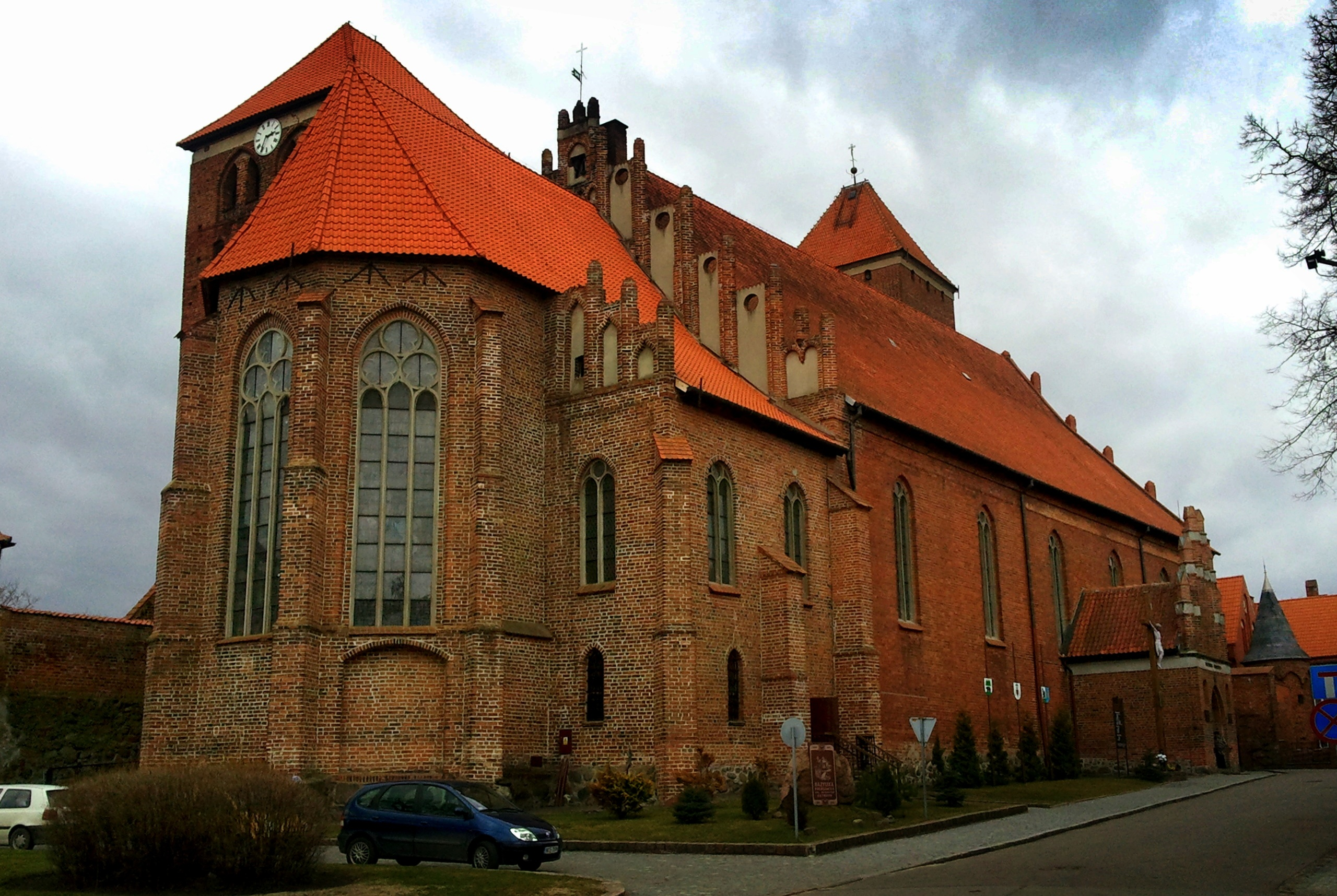
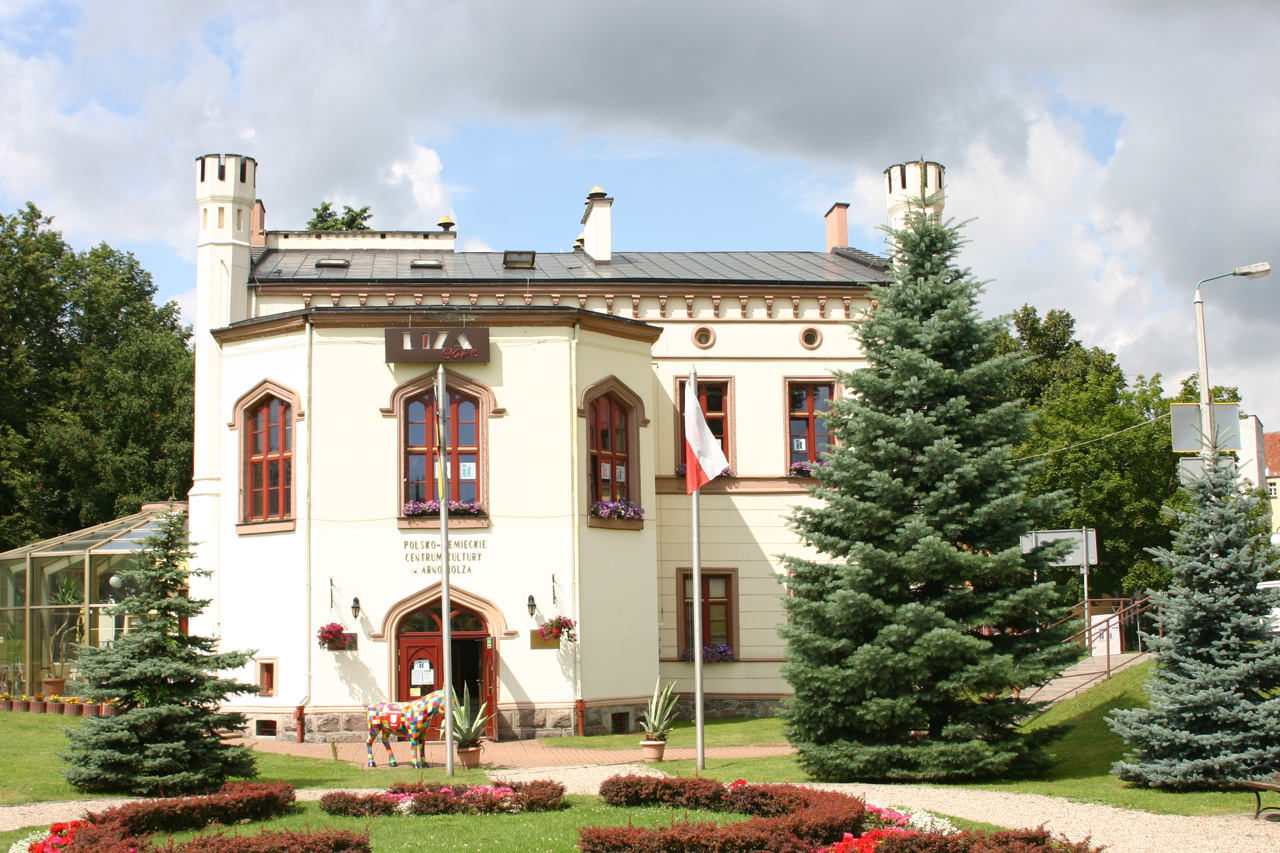
- Panorama of the town Saint George Basilica Former Masonic Lodge

- Flag Coat of arms
- Interactive map of Kętrzyn
- Location within Poland
- Coordinates: 54°5′N 21°23′E
- Country: Poland
- Voivodeship: Warmian–Masurian
- County: Kętrzyn
- Gmina: Kętrzyn (urban gmina)
- Established: 1329
- Town rights: 1357

Government
  - Mayor: Ryszard Niedziółka

Area
  - Total: 10.34 km^{2} (3.99 sq mi)

Population (2019)
  - Total: 27,478
  - Density: 2,657/km^{2} (6,883/sq mi)
- Time zone: UTC+1 (CET)
  - Summer (DST): UTC+2 (CEST)
- Postal code: 11-400
- Area code: +48 89
- Car plates: NKE
- Website: ketrzyn.pl

Kętrzyn ([ˈkɛntʂɨn], until 1946 Rastembork; German: Rastenburg [ˈʁastn̩bʊʁk]) is a town in northeastern Poland with 27,478 inhabitants (2019). It is the capital of Kętrzyn County in the Warmian–Masurian Voivodeship.

The town is known for the surrounding Masurian Lakeland and numerous monuments of historical value such as the Wolf's Lair in nearby Gierłoż, which was Adolf Hitler's primary headquarters over the course of Nazi Germany's military campaign on the Eastern Front during World War II. The town is also known for its 14th century Teutonic Kętrzyn Castle.

== History ==
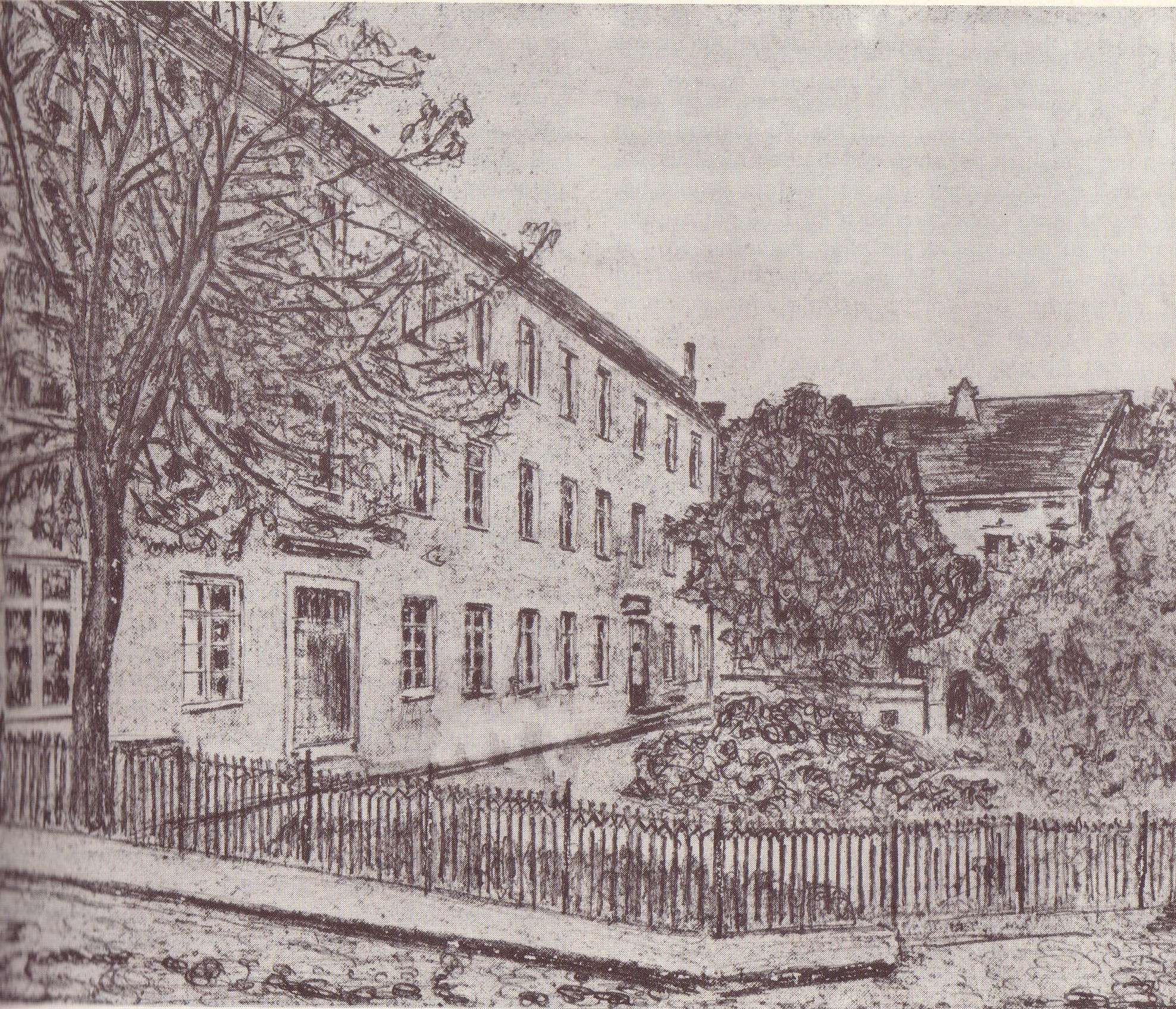
Old gymnasium, attended by Wojciech Kętrzyński between 1855 and 1859

Timeline of the Kętrzyn history
Affiliations

Teutonic Order: 1329–1410
Kingdom of Poland: 1410–1411
Teutonic Order: 1411–1454
Kingdom of Poland: 1454–1461
Teutonic Order: 1461–1466
Teutonic Order (Polish fief): 1466–1525
Duchy of Prussia (Polish fief): 1525–1657
Duchy of Prussia: 1657–1701
Kingdom of Prussia: 1701–1758
Russian Empire (occupied): 1758–1762
Kingdom of Prussia: 1762–1871
German Empire: 1871–1918
Weimar Germany: 1918–1933
Nazi Germany: 1933–1945
Soviet Union (occupied): 1945
Republic of Poland: 1945–1952
Polish People's Republic: 1952–1989
Republic of Poland: 1989–present

The original inhabitants of the region were the Balt tribe of the Aesti, mentioned by Tacitus in his Germania (AD 98). The town, known in German as Rastenburg and in Polish as Rastembork, was established in 1329 in the State of the Teutonic Knights and was granted town rights in 1357 by Henning Schindekop.

After the Battle of Grunwald, in 1410, the mayor surrendered the town to Poland, however, it fell back to the Teutonic Knights in 1411. In 1440, the town joined the anti-Teutonic Prussian Confederation. Upon the request of the Confederation, King Casimir IV Jagiellon incorporated the region and town to the Kingdom of Poland in 1454. The town then recognized the Polish King as the rightful ruler and the townspeople sent their representative to Königsberg to pay homage to the King.

After the Thirteen Years’ War (1454–1466), per the 1466 peace treaty, the town was part of Poland as a fief held by the Teutonic Order's state and, from 1525 to 1701, it was part of the Duchy of Prussia, a Polish fief until 1657. The town's seal was attached to the documents of the peace treaty of 1466. In the second half of the 17th century, Poles constituted around a half of the town's population, the other half being Germans. In 1667, a Polish church school was established.

In 1701 the town became part of the Kingdom of Prussia and subsequently, in 1871, part of Germany. During the Seven Years' War, from 1758 to 1762, the town was occupied by the Russians, in June 1807, throughout the Napoleonic Wars, the division of General Jan Henryk Dąbrowski was stationed in the town. Following the unsuccessful Polish November Uprising, in 1832–1833, Polish insurgents, including several officers, were interned in the town.

In the late 19th century a Polish Lutheran parish still existed, despite the policy of Germanisation conducted by the Prussian authorities. In the second half of the 19th century, a sugar factory, brewery and mill were built.

=== 20th century ===
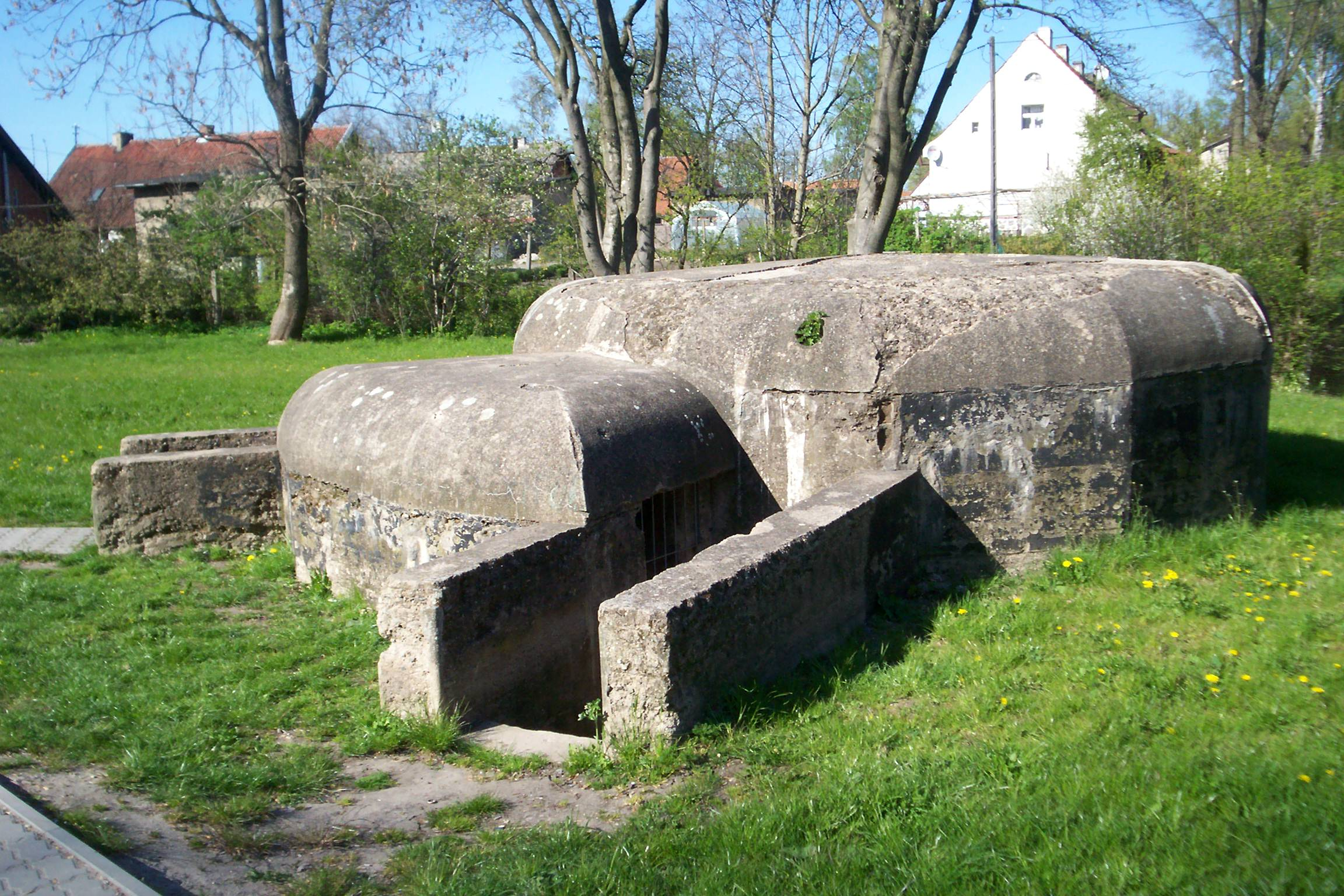
A preserved air raid shelter from World War II in Kętrzyn

Rastenburg and the surrounding district was the scene of the First World War's First Battle of the Masurian Lakes and Second Battle of the Masurian Lakes. During the Second World War Adolf Hitler's wartime military headquarters, the Wolf's Lair, was in the forest east of Rastenburg. The bunker was the setting for the failed assassination attempt of the 20 July plot against Hitler. During the war, the Germans operated a forced labour camp for Jews in the town.

In 1945, the area suffered devastation from both the retreating Germans and advancing Soviets during the Vistula-Oder campaign. Some ruins of the Wolf's Lair remain. The town was a Wehrmacht garrison town until it was occupied by the Red Army on 27 January 1945. The largely abandoned town was heavily destroyed by the Soviets.

After German surrender, the town was assigned to Poland by the Soviets. Sovereignty over the town was officially transferred on May 18, 1945. At the Potsdam Conference, the Western Allies accepted establishment of Polish rule. The town's surviving German residents who had not evacuated were subsequently expelled westward in accordance with provisions included in the Potsdam Agreement and replaced with Poles, most of whom were themselves expelled from the pre-war Polish Vilnius Region that was annexed by the Soviet Union and given to the Lithuanian Soviet Socialist Republic. The town was given the historic Polish name Rastembork in 1945, and in 1946 it was renamed to Kętrzyn after the Polish historian, activist and patriot Wojciech Kętrzyński, who attended the local gymnasium in the years 1855–1859.

After the war, the town's life was being rebuilt. In 1945, the Municipal Theater was established. Thanks to voluntary contributions, books were purchased for newly organized public libraries. A museum was created in the renovated castle.

From 1975 to 1998, Kętrzyn was administratively located in the Olsztyn Voivodeship.

== Population ==
Historical population
Year	Pop.	±%
1900	11,144	—
1910	11,945	+7.2%
1925	13,859	+16.0%
1939	19,634	+41.7%
1950	11,275	−42.6%
1960	16,243	+44.1%

== Climate ==
Kętrzyn's climate is either oceanic (Köppen: Cfb) or humid continental (Köppen: Dfb), depending on the isotherm used. The climate of the city has a considerable thermal amplitude, but still with some not so pronounced influence of the sea.

Climate data for Ketrzyn (Wilamowo Airport), elevation: 110 m or 360 ft, 1991–2020 normals, extremes 1966–present
Month	Jan	Feb	Mar	Apr	May	Jun	Jul	Aug	Sep	Oct	Nov	Dec	Year
Record high °C (°F)	12.3 (54.1)	15.3 (59.5)	22.6 (72.7)	28.7 (83.7)	30.6 (87.1)	33.3 (91.9)	35.1 (95.2)	36.1 (97.0)	35.5 (95.9)	25.0 (77.0)	17.8 (64.0)	12.0 (53.6)	36.1 (97.0)
Mean daily maximum °C (°F)	0.1 (32.2)	1.4 (34.5)	5.9 (42.6)	13.4 (56.1)	18.7 (65.7)	21.6 (70.9)	24.0 (75.2)	23.6 (74.5)	18.3 (64.9)	11.9 (53.4)	5.6 (42.1)	1.6 (34.9)	12.2 (54.0)
Daily mean °C (°F)	−2.2 (28.0)	−1.4 (29.5)	2.0 (35.6)	8.0 (46.4)	13.0 (55.4)	16.1 (61.0)	18.4 (65.1)	18.0 (64.4)	13.4 (56.1)	8.1 (46.6)	3.3 (37.9)	−0.5 (31.1)	8.0 (46.4)
Mean daily minimum °C (°F)	−4.6 (23.7)	−4.0 (24.8)	−1.4 (29.5)	3.1 (37.6)	7.5 (45.5)	10.9 (51.6)	13.3 (55.9)	13.0 (55.4)	9.3 (48.7)	4.9 (40.8)	1.2 (34.2)	−2.7 (27.1)	4.2 (39.6)
Record low °C (°F)	−30.7 (−23.3)	−28.7 (−19.7)	−24.0 (−11.2)	−9.6 (14.7)	−3.7 (25.3)	−0.1 (31.8)	4.7 (40.5)	3.3 (37.9)	−2.5 (27.5)	−8.0 (17.6)	−21.4 (−6.5)	−25.2 (−13.4)	−30.7 (−23.3)
Average precipitation mm (inches)	32.6 (1.28)	27.6 (1.09)	35.3 (1.39)	36.0 (1.42)	58.4 (2.30)	74.7 (2.94)	80.9 (3.19)	73.9 (2.91)	55.6 (2.19)	54.7 (2.15)	44.4 (1.75)	36.5 (1.44)	610.6 (24.04)
Average extreme snow depth cm (inches)	9.5 (3.7)	9.4 (3.7)	6.1 (2.4)	2.1 (0.8)	0.3 (0.1)	0.0 (0.0)	0.0 (0.0)	0.0 (0.0)	0.0 (0.0)	0.6 (0.2)	2.9 (1.1)	6.1 (2.4)	9.5 (3.7)
Average precipitation days (≥ 0.1 mm)	16.63	14.78	14.33	11.70	12.97	14.23	14.80	13.90	12.63	14.33	15.43	16.97	172.71
Average snowy days (≥ 0 cm)	18.4	17.6	10.1	1.5	0.0	0.0	0.0	0.0	0.0	0.5	4.4	13.9	66.4
Average relative humidity (%)	89.3	86.8	79.9	71.1	72.4	76.1	77.5	76.7	81.7	86.2	91.2	91.1	81.6
Mean monthly sunshine hours	44.8	64.1	124.6	192.3	251.4	247.3	254.1	234.3	160.6	105.3	42.2	33.6	1,754.4
Average ultraviolet index	1	2	2	4	5	5	5	5	3	2	1	1	3
Source 1: Institute of Meteorology and Water Management
Source 2: Meteomodel.pl (records, relative humidity 1991–2020), kiedy-jechac.pl (UV index)

== Sports ==
The local football team is Granica Kętrzyn. It competes in the lower leagues.

== People ==
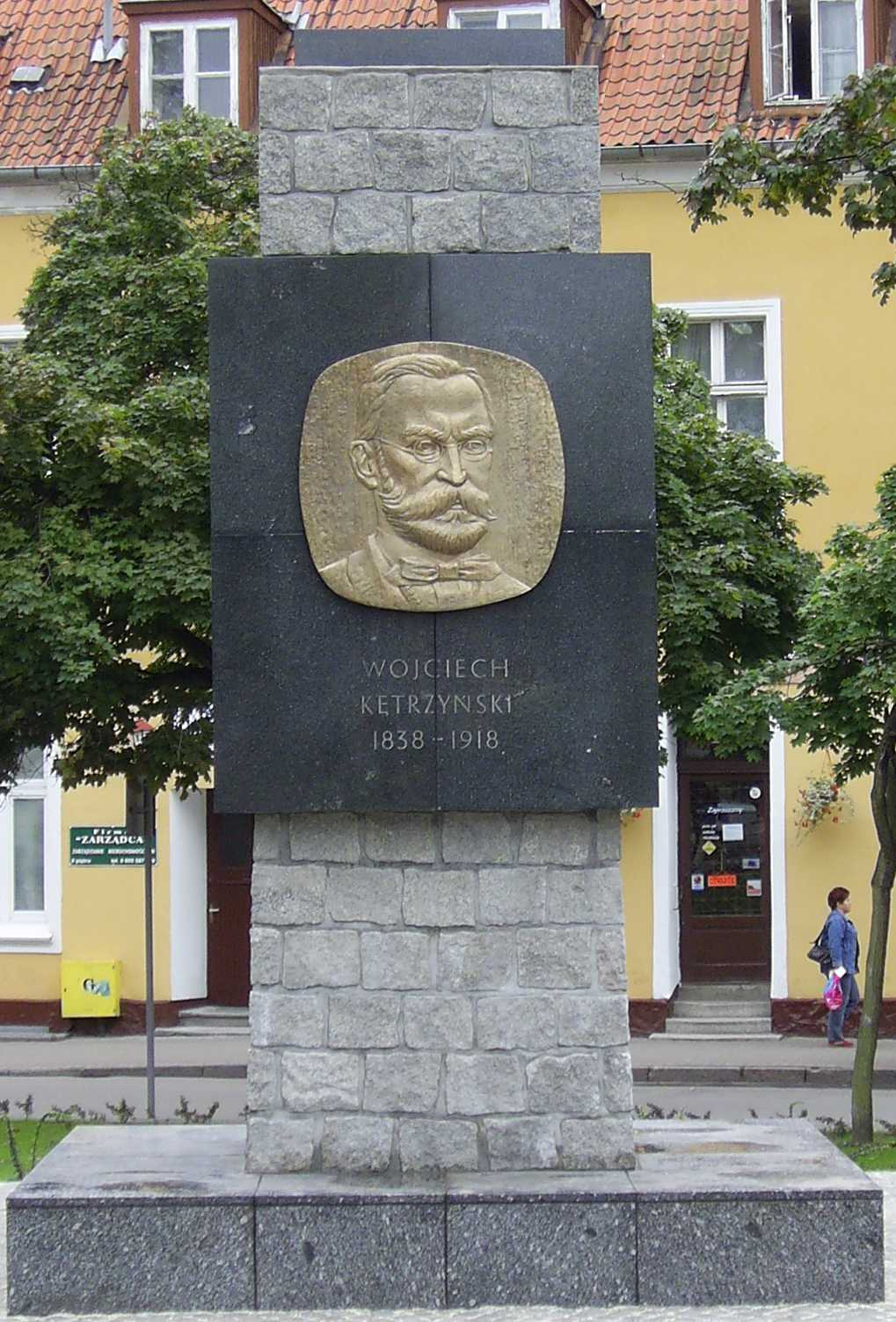
Monument to Wojciech Kętrzyński in the town center

- Johann Dietrich von Hülsen (1693–1767), Prussian general
- Karl Bogislaus Reichert (1811–1883), German anatomist, embryologist and histologist
- Wojciech Kętrzyński (1838–1918), Polish historian and activist
- Elisabet Boehm (1859–1943), German women's rights advocate
- Arno Holz (1863–1929), German poet and dramatist
- Wilhelm Wien (1864–1928), German physicist worked on blackbody radiation
- Emma Döll (1873–1930), German politician (SPD/USPD/KPD)
- Rüdiger von Heyking (1894–1956), German Luftwaffe general
- Hanns Scharff (1907–1992), German Luftwaffe interrogator internationally renowned for developing humane, effective interrogation techniques
- Waldemar Grzimek (1918–1984), German sculptor
- Siegfried Tiefensee (1922–2009), German composer
- Dietrich von Bausznern (1928–1980), German composer, cantor, organist and music teacher
- Marek Ziółkowski (born 1955), Polish diplomat
- Krzysztof Kononowicz (1963–2025), former candidate for the office of mayor of Białystok and internet celebrity
- Piotr Lech (born 1968), Polish footballer
- Krzysztof Raczkowski (1970–2005), musician and drummer of the Polish death metal band Vader
- Piotr Trafarski (born 1983), Polish footballer

== Gallery ==
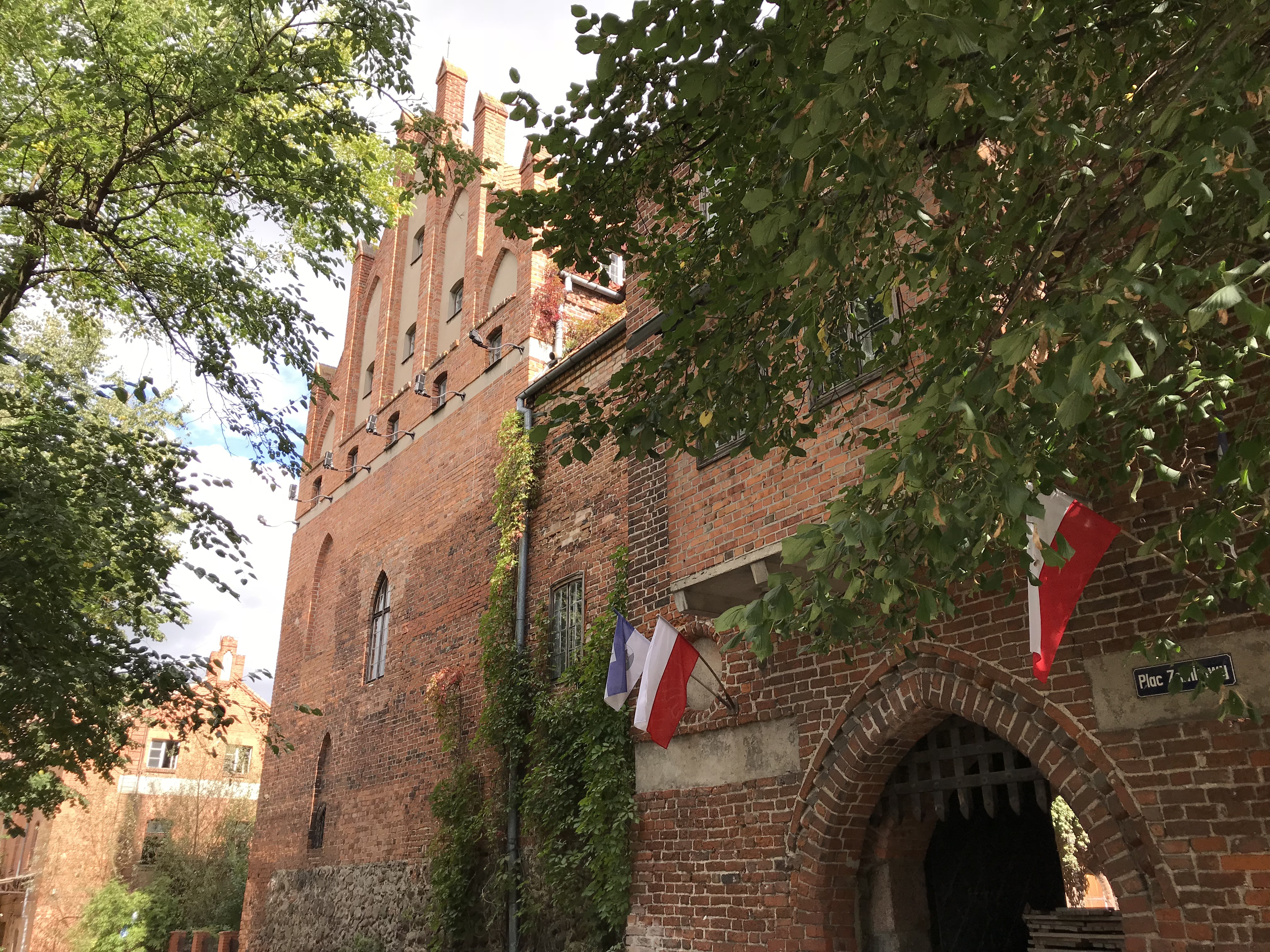
Kętrzyn Castle

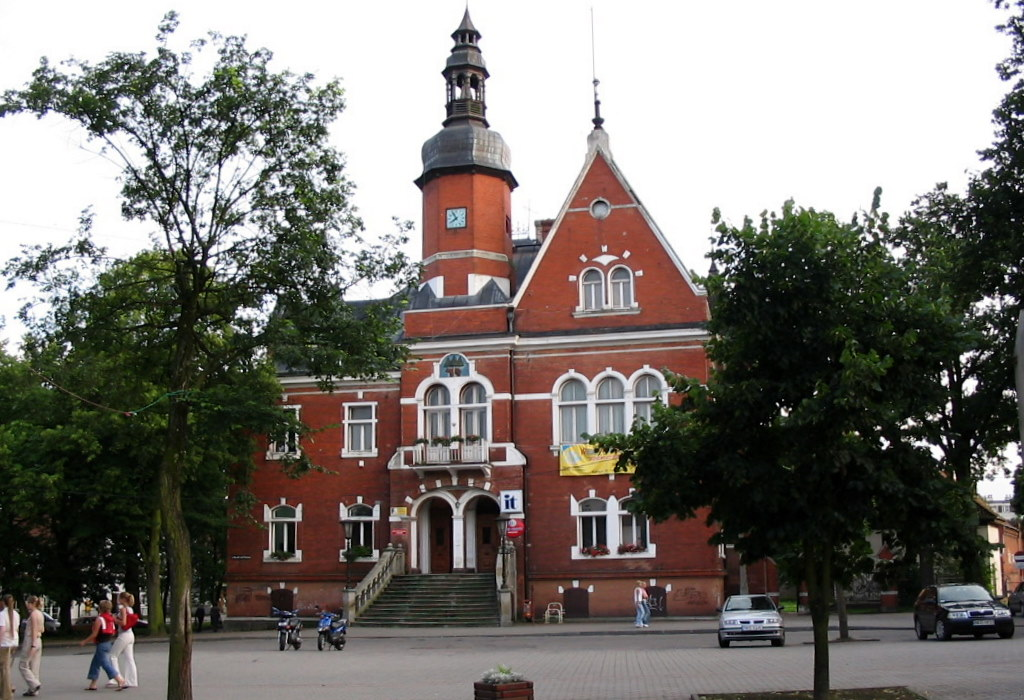
Town Hall

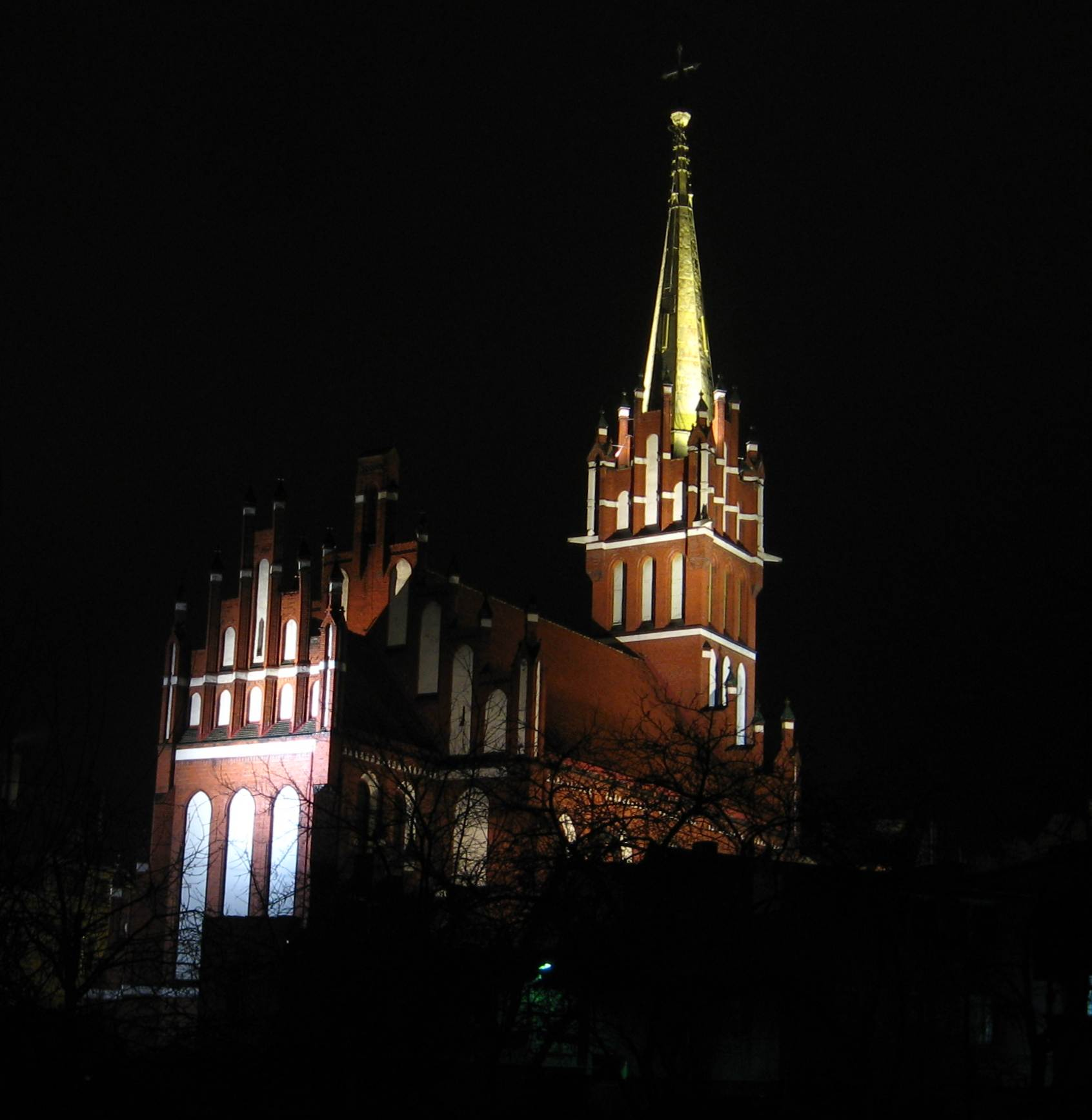
Saint Catherine of Alexandria church

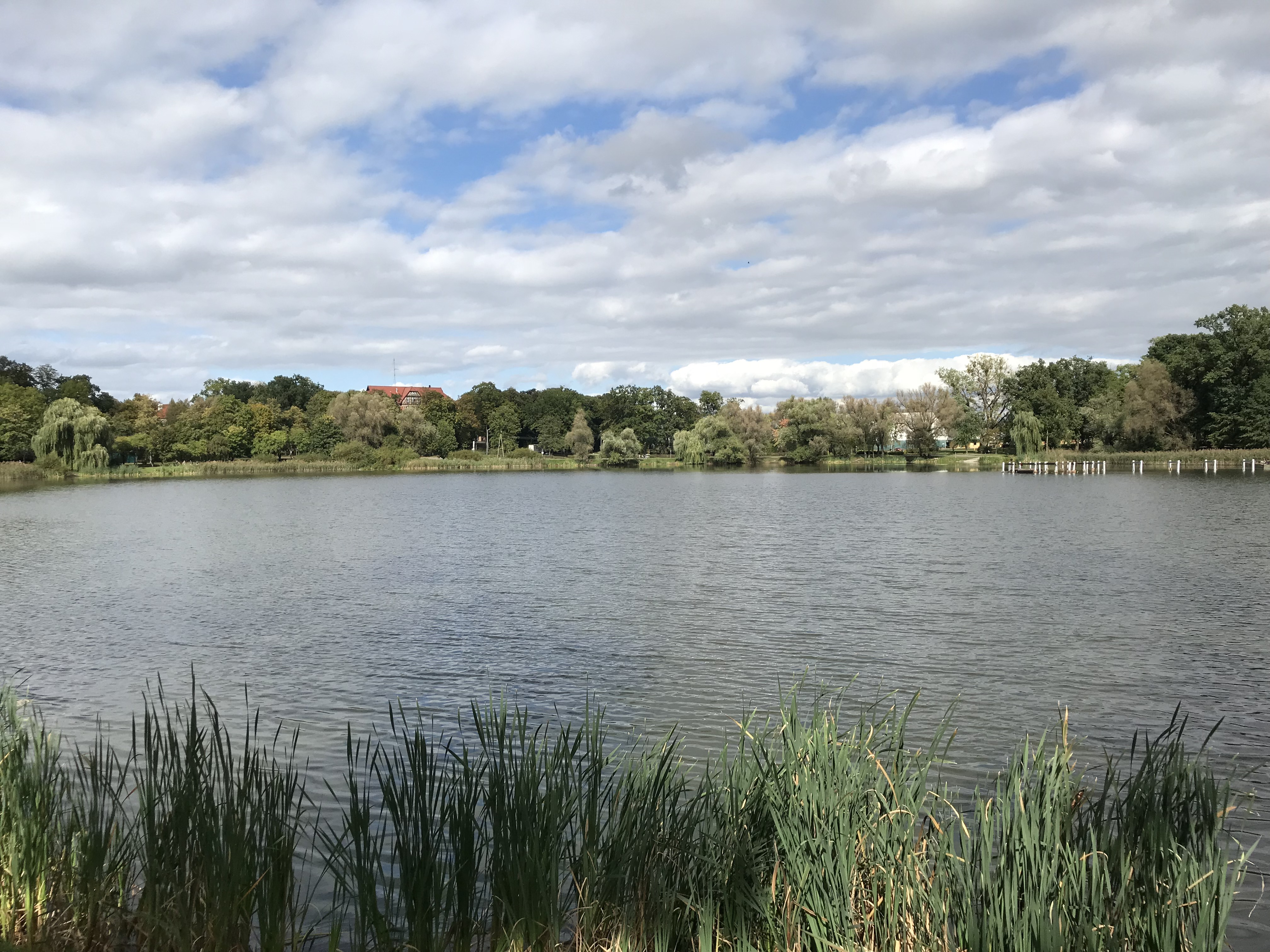
Kętrzyn Lake

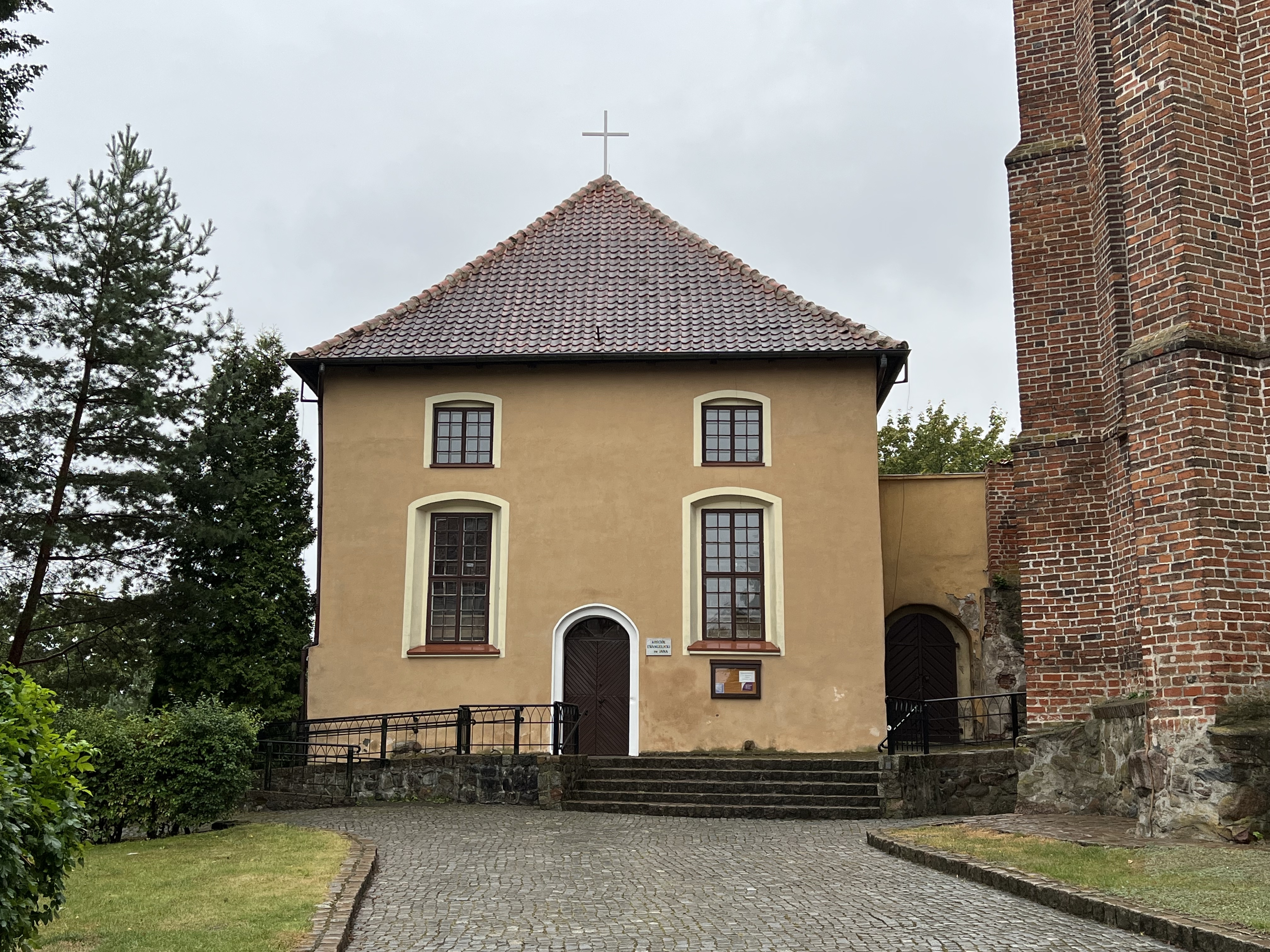
Saint John church

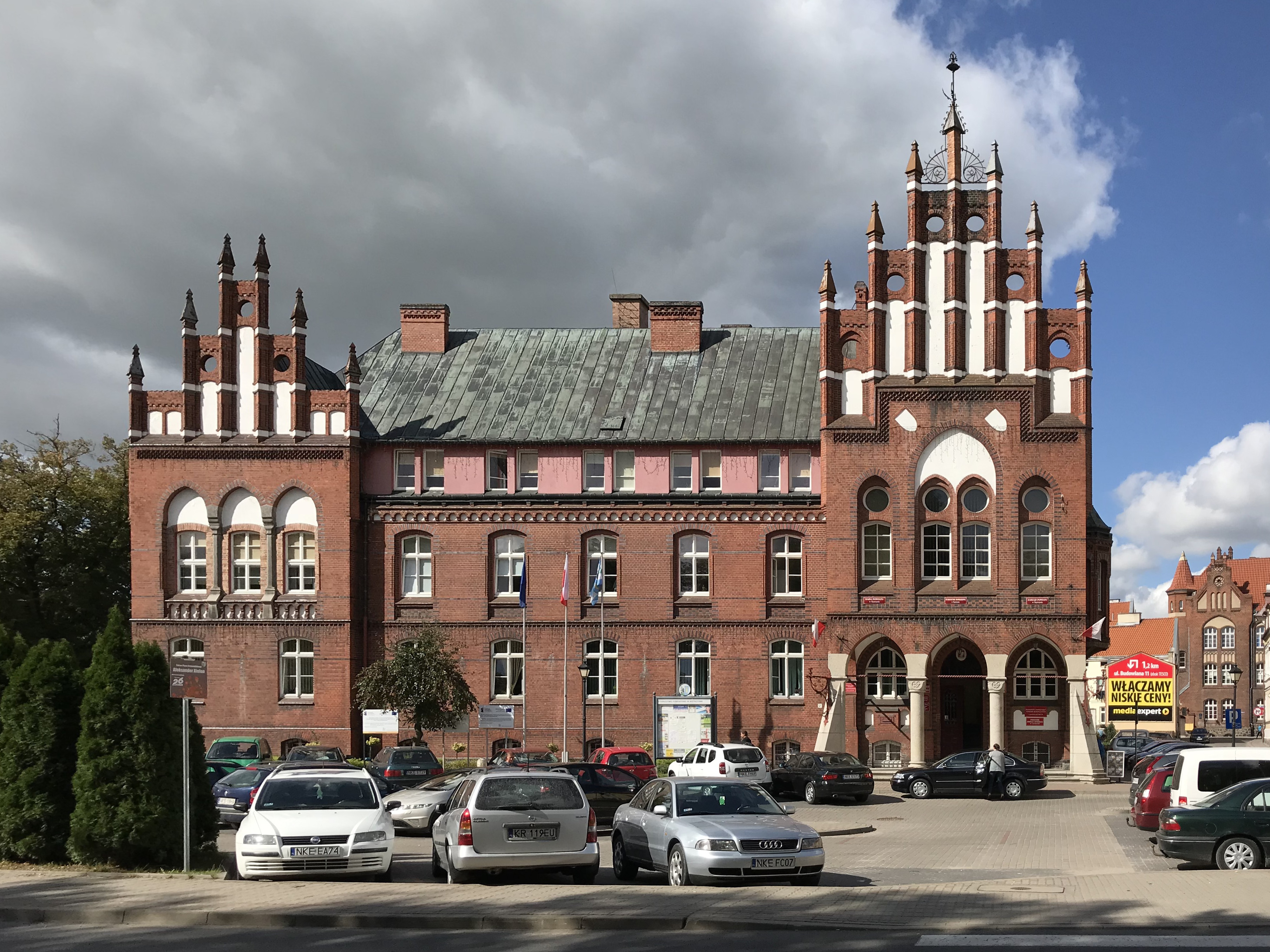
Kętrzyn County seat

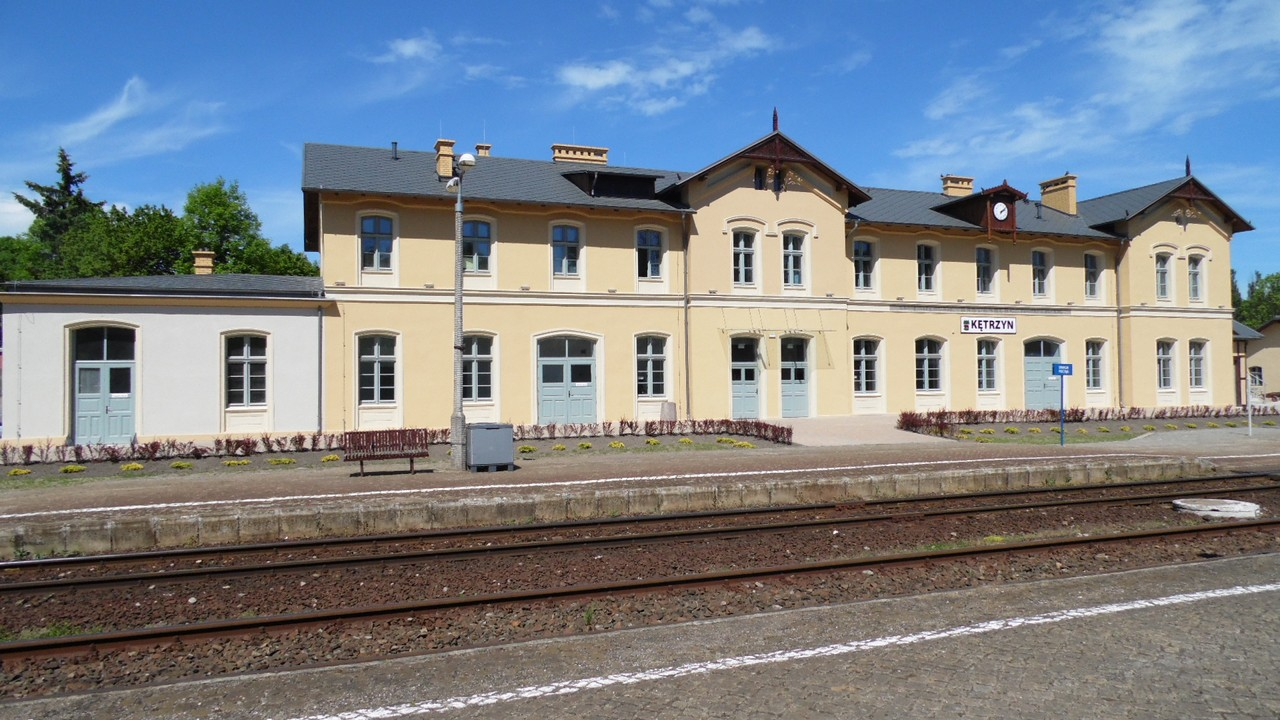
Train station

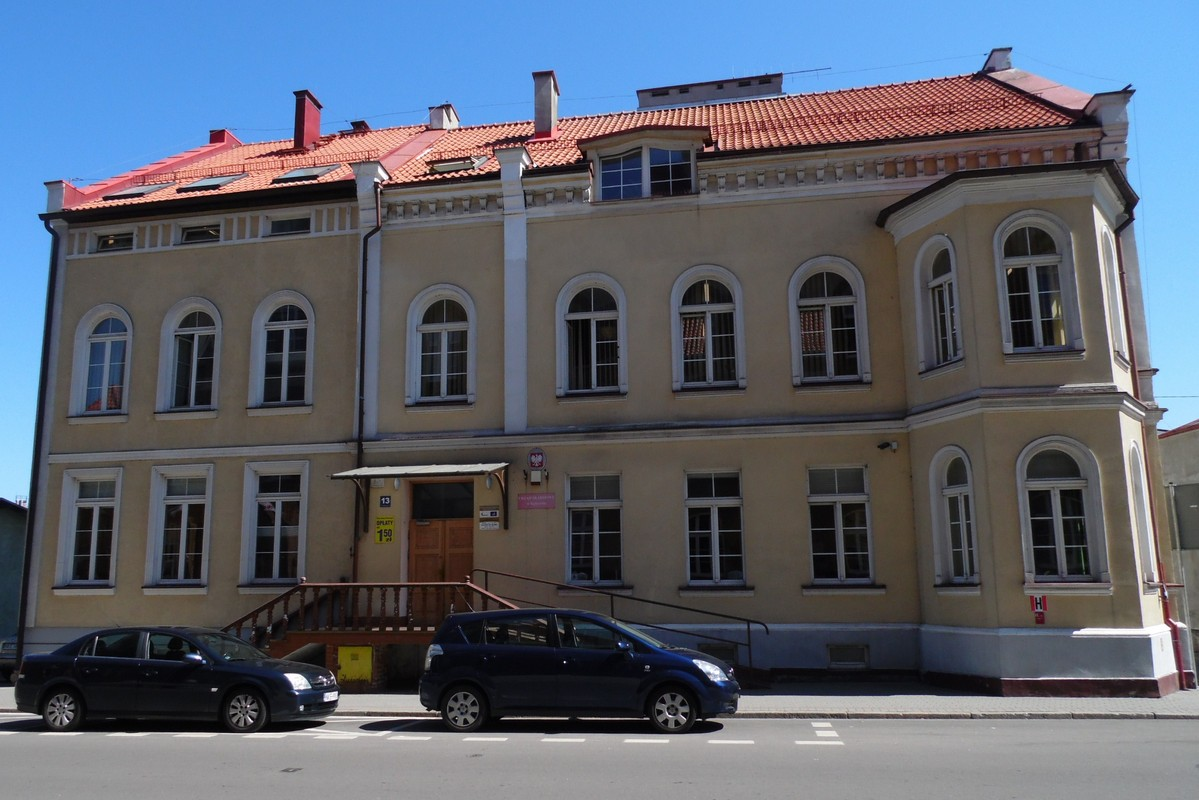
Tax office

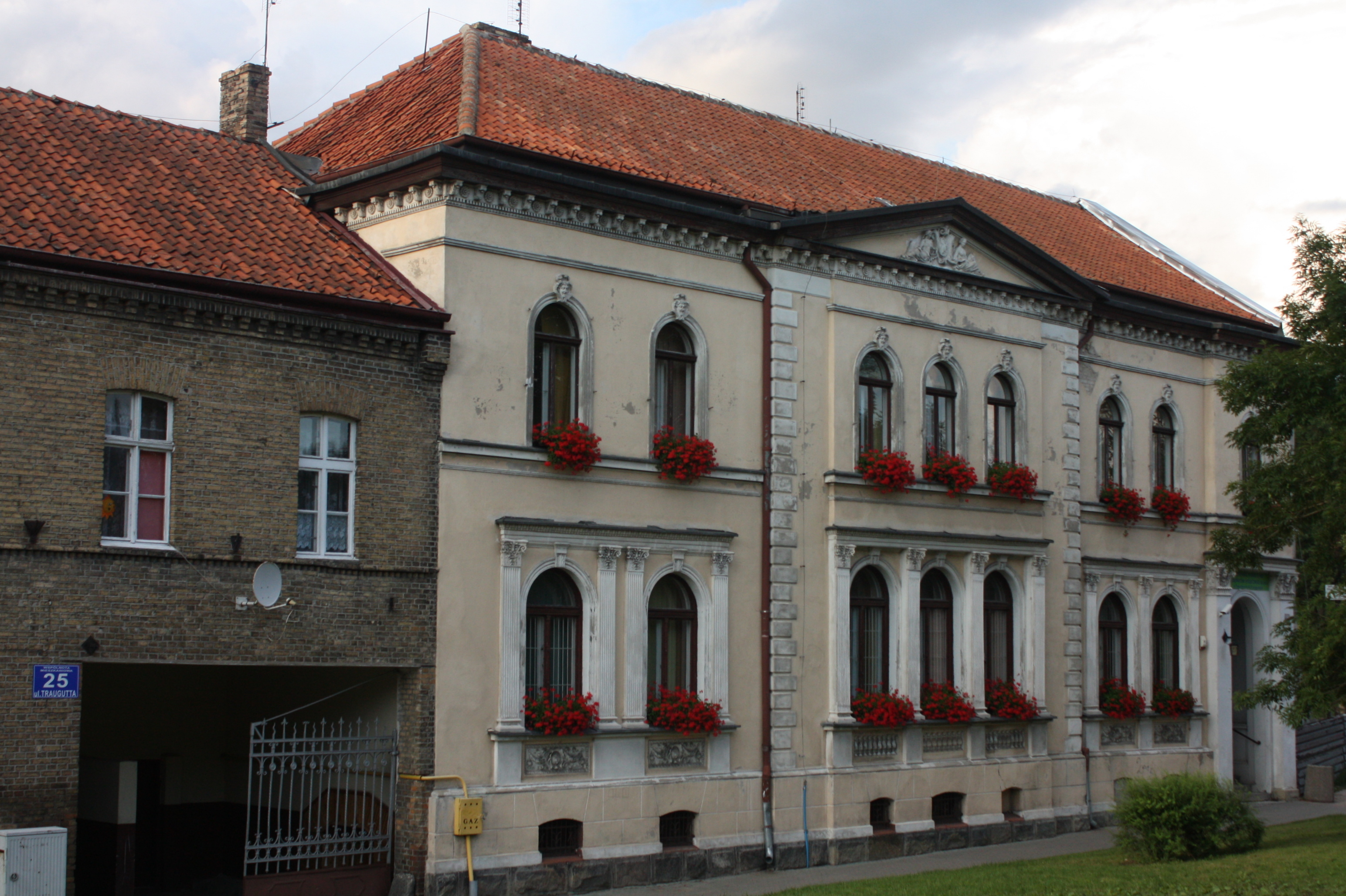
Old townhouses in the town center

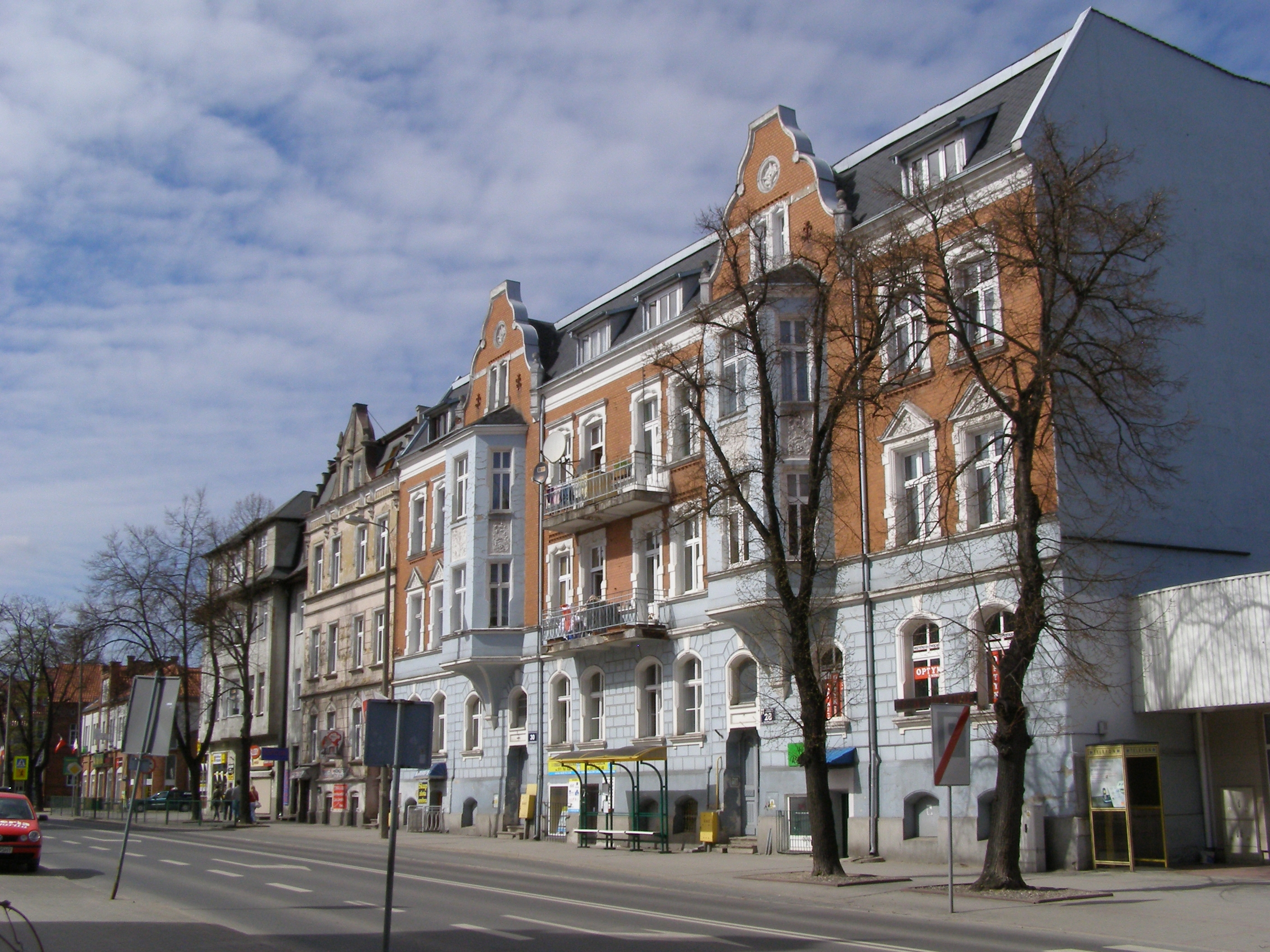
Old townhouses in the town center

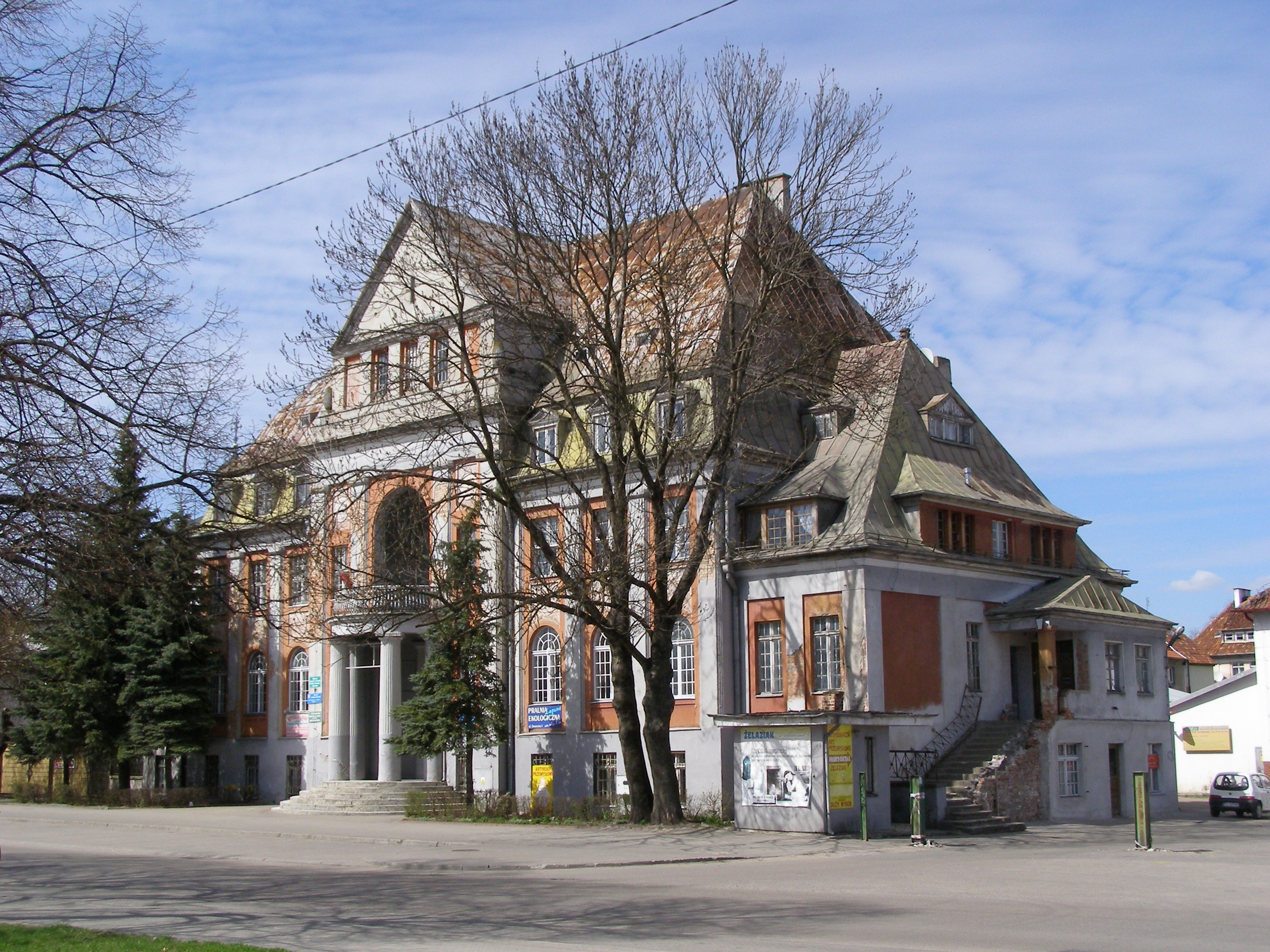
Former bank building

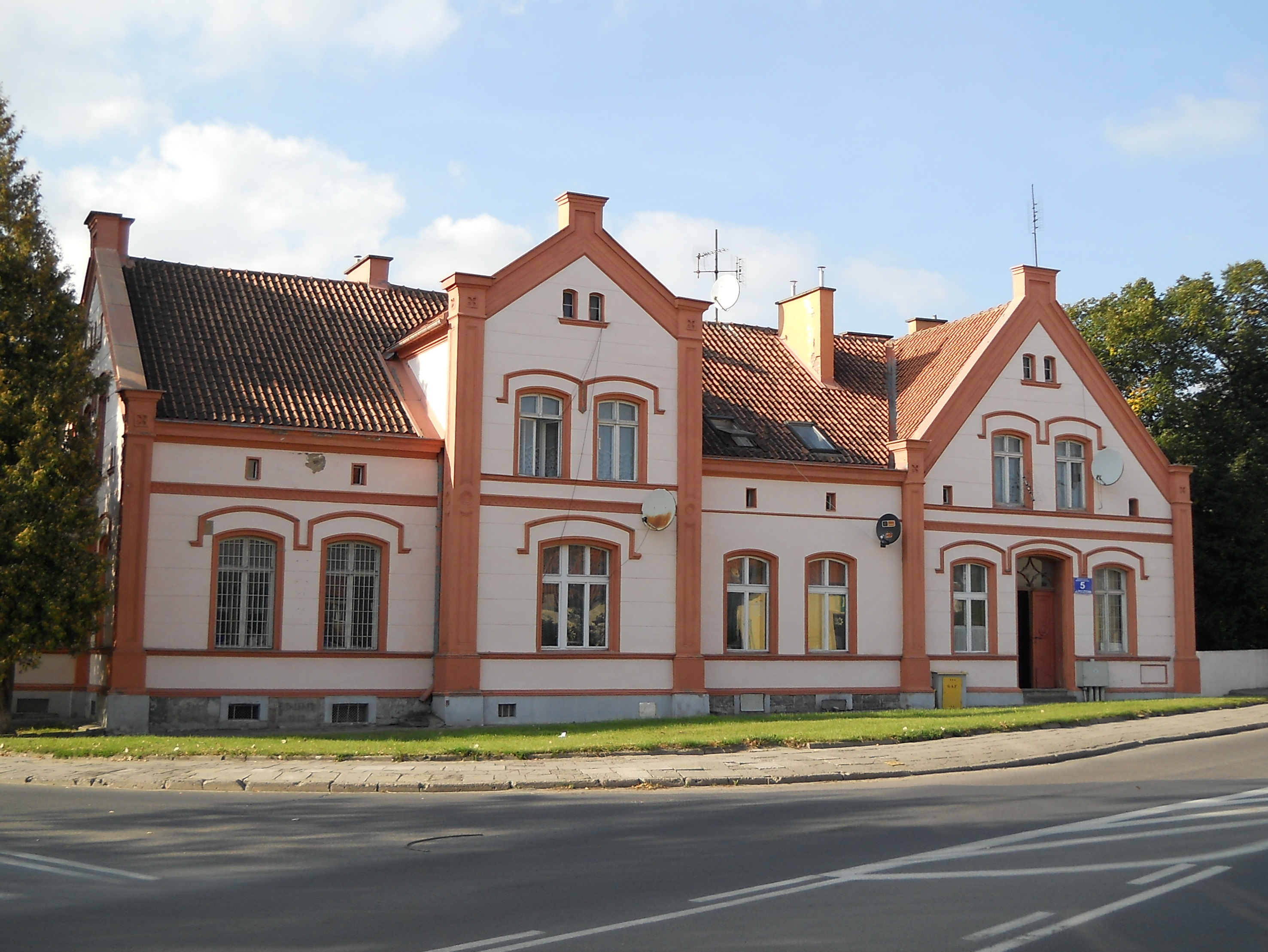
Old house

== International relations ==
=== Twin towns – Sister cities ===
Kętrzyn is twinned with:

- Volodymyr, Ukraine
- Wesel, Germany
- Zlaté Hory, Czech Republic
