= Kętrzyn Castle =

Coordinates: 54.0742°N 21.3769°E

- Zamek w Kętrzynie (Polish)
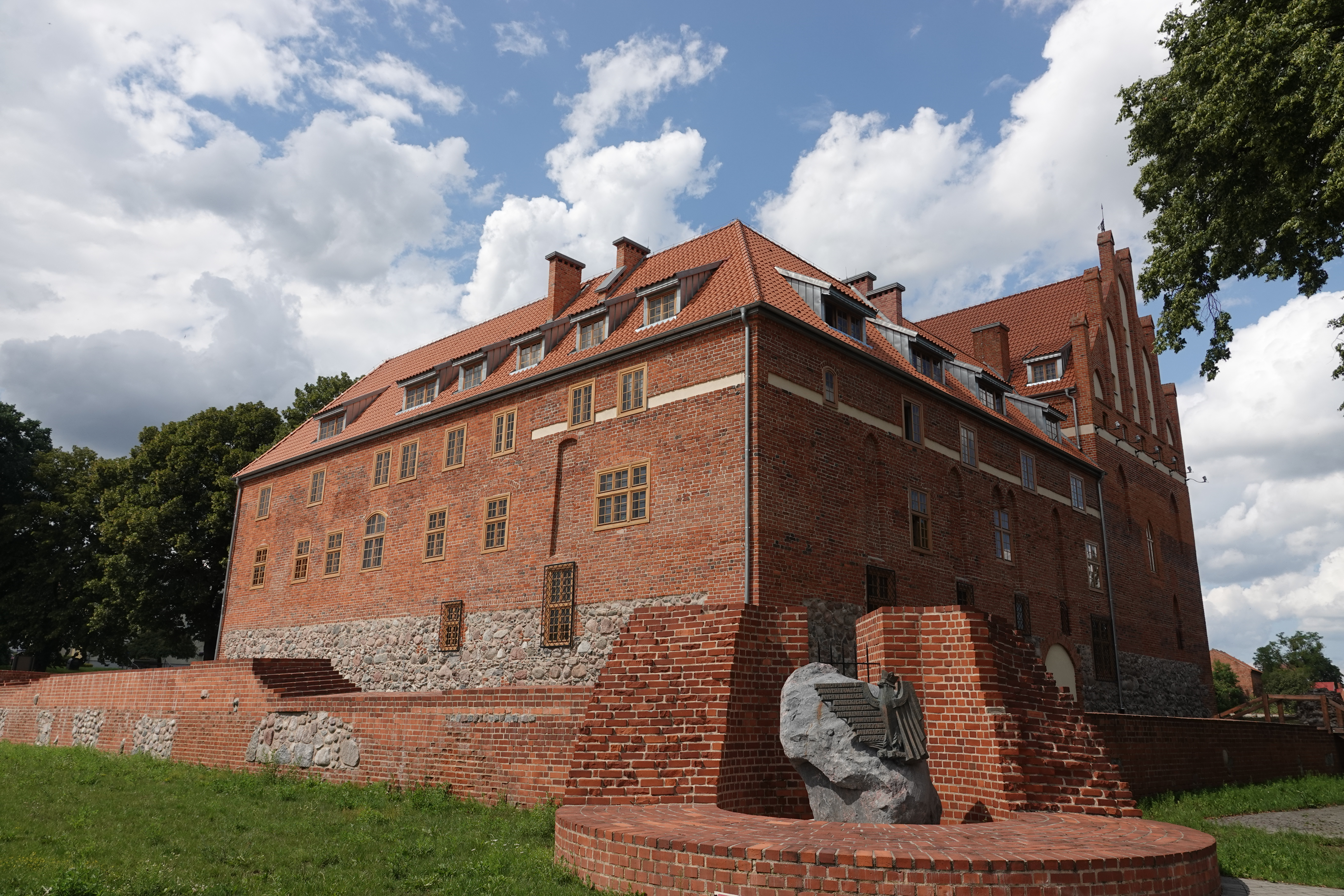
- View of Kętrzyn Castle
- Interactive map of Kętrzyn Castle
- Type: Castle
- Location: Kętrzyn, Warmian-Masurian Voivodeship, Poland

History
- Founder: Teutonic Order
- Built: 1357–1374
- Demolished: 1797, 1945
- Rebuilt: 1962–1967

Site notes
- Architectural style: Brick Gothic

The Kętrzyn Castle or Rastenburg Castle is a Brick Gothic castle located in Kętrzyn, Poland.

Founded in the second half of the 14th century by the Teutonic Knights in the historic Baltic Prussian land of the Bartians, the castle served as a defensive and planning stronghold. During Teutonic rule, the castle housed about forty monks, two of whom (Michael Küchmeister von Sternberg and Paul von Rusdorf) became future Grand Masters of the Teutonic Order.

Now, the rebuilt castle houses the Wojciech Kętrzyński Museum, the Konik Mazurski Gallery and the Municipal Public Library. Collections from the 15th to 19th centuries form a permanent exhibition.

== History ==
The area around the modern-day town was inhabited by the Baltic Prussian tribe of the Bartians. In the 1250s, the Teutonic Knights invaded the Bartians. In the pre-Teutonic period, the settlement was called Rast, meaning stake or pole. Rastenburg itself was founded by the State of the Teutonic Order in 1329. Shortly thereafter, Grand Master Dietrich von Altenburg founded a wooden watchtower called Rastenburg (Rastembork in Polish), which was probably located on a small hill near the Guber River, where the modern-day castle stands. It had the functions of defending the land from raids of the Grand Duchy of Lithuania as well as acting as a staging point for Teutonic expeditions to Lithuania itself. The watchtower was captured and burned twice by the Lithuanians (led by the Grand Dukes Algirdas and Kęstutis) in 1345 and 1347, but was rebuilt each time.

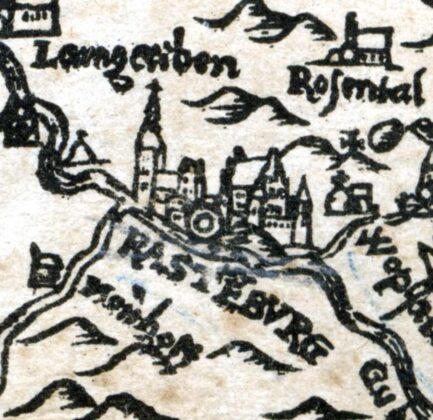
The castle as depicted by Caspar Hennenberger, 1595

When Rastenburg gained town rights in 1357, construction began on the brick castle. It was first mentioned in a list of Teutonic castles in 1374, most likely meaning it was completed before that year. The north wing of the castle contained the residence of a pfleger, the local administrator of the Order, subordinate to the commandery of Balga. Originally a three-winged building, the castle was enclosed on the west side by a wall with a gate. Around 1410 the castle arsenal consisted of seven cannons with stone balls and a small amount of light firearms and crossbows. After the Battle of Grunwald, a knight and castle procurator by the name of Johart, together with mayor Hermann Barddyne, surrendered the city and castle to Władysław Jagiełło's troops, although under the Peace of Thorn in 1411 the town was given back to the Order. In 1440, Rastenburg joined the Prussian Confederation, openly revolting against the Order on 13 February 1454 during the Thirteen Years' War. The residents of the city, led by craftsmen from the shoemaker's guild, occupied the castle and drowned the pfleger Wolfgang Sauer. The castle was then handed over to Polish troops, but was recaptured by the Order with the help of mercenaries in 1461. It remained in their hands until 1525. The rebellious guild of shoemakers were punished with a ban on sitting in the town council.

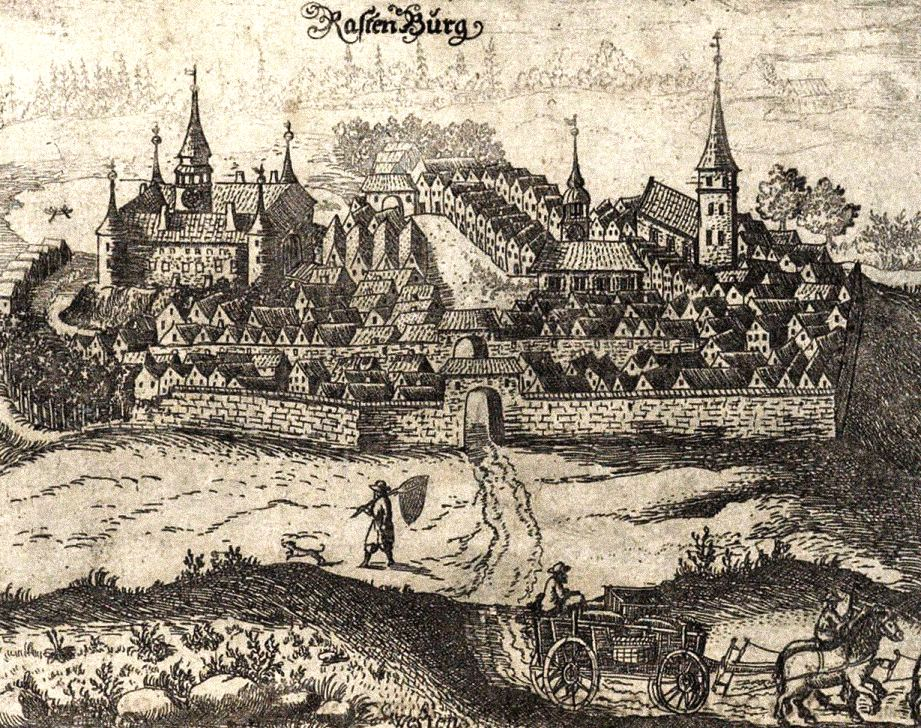
Panorama of Rastenburg as depicted by Christoph Hartknoch, 1684

In 1525 the castle became the seat of the ducal starost, as part of the newly formed Duchy of Prussia. Further construction on the castle carried on in 1528–1529 and 1559–1560. A defensive wall on three sides surrounded it, with cylindrical towers being added in the early 16th century. A chapel also existed, which was still in use in 1628. The castle and the adjacent part of the town housed a bakery, kitchen, mill, malthouse and brewery, a meat and grain store, a pantry, an armory, and a prison. The western wing of the castle was rebuilt before 1566, with a cylindrical tower with a staircase built in the northwest corner of the courtyard in 1622. In 1682, two uppers floors of the northern wing were destroyed.

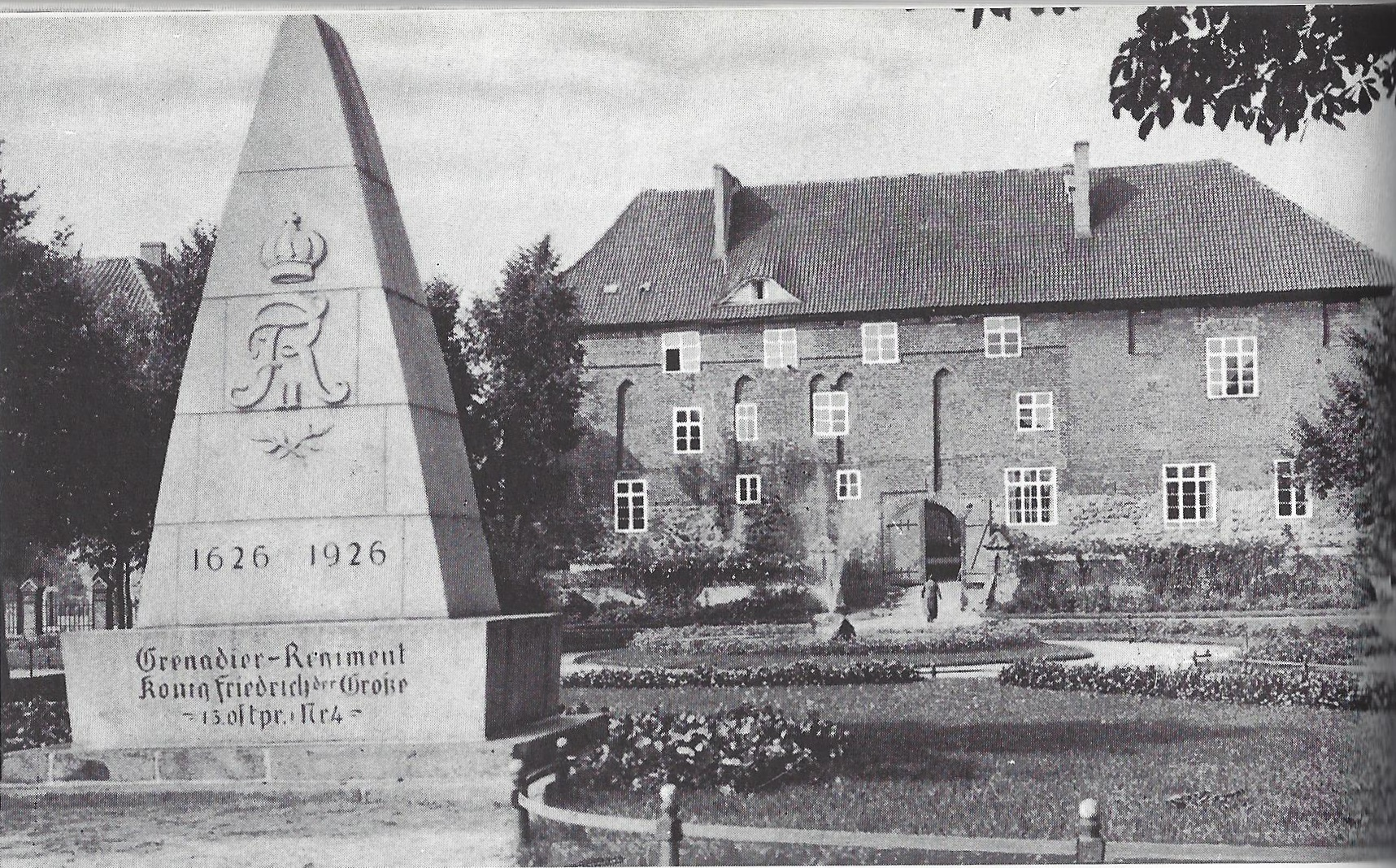
The castle in the 1930s

The first known description of the castle is from around 1706, written by local school rector and author of "Chronik von Rastenburg" Adam Huldreich Schaffer. In 1742, the resident starosta Groeben complained in a letter to the king about the cold inside the castle's walls, at the same time informing that for this reason he had to rent a house in the city in winter. After a major fire in 1797, the castle became property of the city and most rooms were converted for housing either in 1797 or 1911. In the 18th and 19th centuries, the castle was rebuilt for more residential functions, with newer and wider windows replacing the old Gothic windows. The plan for the castle's reconstruction was made in the 19th century. In 1911–1912, the castle was rebuilt again. It also served as the office of the 3rd Infantry Brigade.

Minor conservation work was carried out in the 1930s. Before the Second World War, the castle housed a financial office and other apartments for officials. In the early 1940s, the western part of the basements were converted into an air-raid shelter. In January 1945 the city was captured by the Soviet 31st Army and the castle with most of the old town were burned down. Using German architect Conrad Steinbrecht's sketches, reconstruction took place in 1962–1967, and the building regained its Gothic character.

== Architecture ==
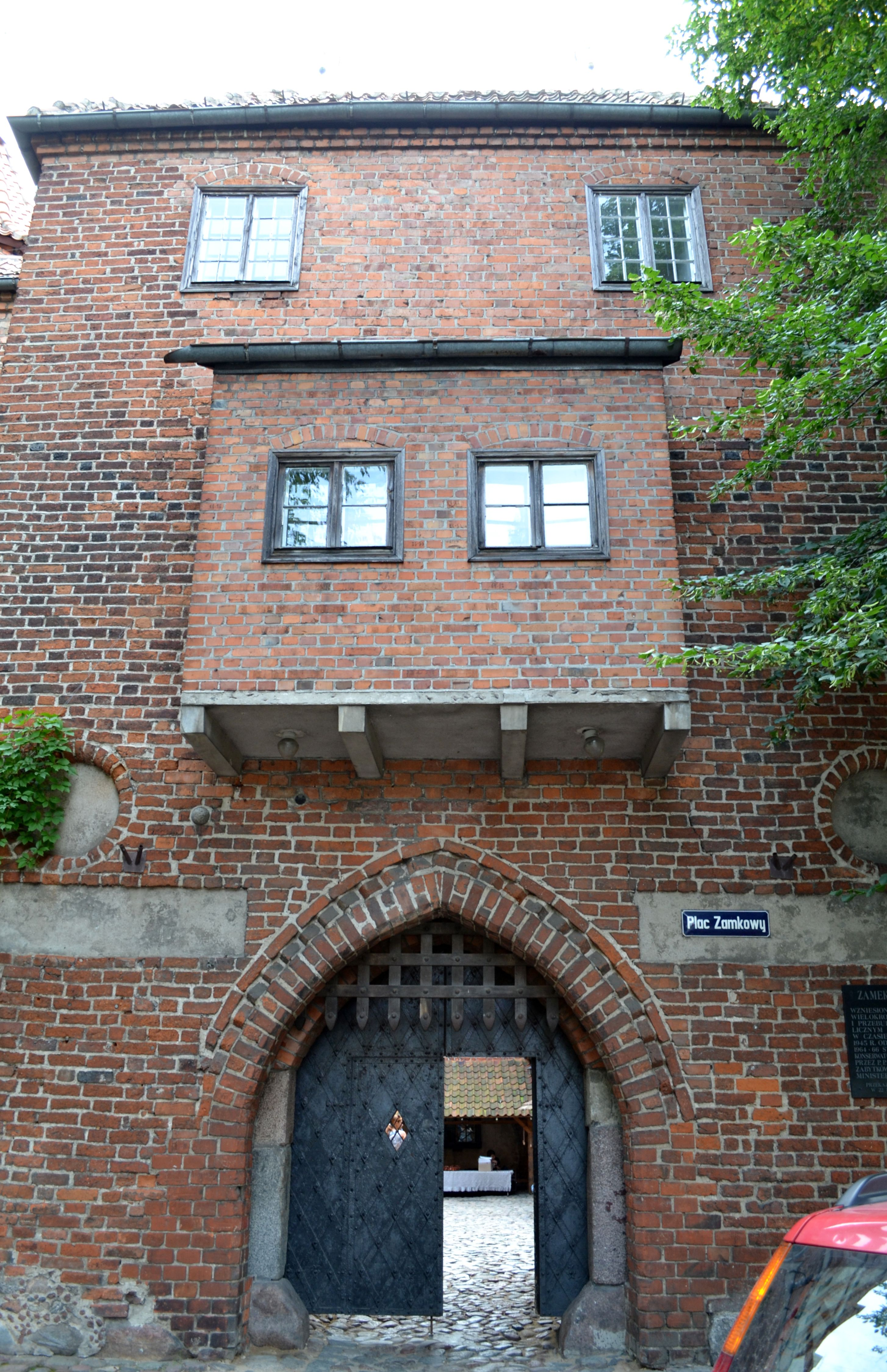
Main gate of the castle

The castle was adjacent to the west and partially to the north of Rastenburg. On the southern side, the Guber River flowed, from which a mill canal was dug, spilling under the castle into a sizeable pond. The castle itself was smaller than other strongholds erected by the Order. It had a towerless, three-wing structure, measuring 31.3 x 36.7 meters, built of bricks on a stone plinth. It did not have an outer bailey.

The main building on a rectangular plan of 31.1 meters long and 13.1 meters wide, divided into three above-ground storeys, was built from the north. Above the economic ground floor with three chambers, there were are also three rooms: two representative and residential (the pfleger’s chamber, refectory), and a chapel to the east. Above there was a warehouse and defense storey, especially important as the castle did not have a tower. The ground floor windows were small, pointed, each set in a lancet panel. The windows of the first floor were larger, arranged alternately with blendes of identical, pointed shape. The northern range was also distinguished by gables equipped with blendes and pinnacles. The windows of the warehouse storey were closed by less representative segmental arches.

The southern and eastern buildings were narrower and lower. It probably had economic functions. A small courtyard was surrounded by timber cloisters, and the entire perimeter of the castle was surrounded by a defensive porch. In the west, a small gatehouse was built with a bay window added after 1528. A wooden drawbridge, located above the moat, led to it. The outer fortifications consisted of perimeter walls with three towers from the 16th century. Two of them were round, and the north-eastern was quadrangular. The castle from the side of the town was probably separated by the moat, while on the south-eastern side of the stronghold, the canal mentioned above was dug up and a mill pond was formed, joined with the moats. A water castle mill operated on it.

== See also ==
- Ordensburg
- List of castles in Poland
