= Piotr Lech =

Polish footballer

Personal information
- Date of birth: 18 June 1968 (age 58)
- Place of birth: Kętrzyn, Poland
- Height: 1.94 m (6 ft 4 in)
- Position: Goalkeeper

Senior career*
Years	Team	Apps	(Gls)
1986	Granica Kętrzyn		
1986–1997	Ruch Chorzów	131	(0)
1998	Zagłębie Lubin	16	(0)
1998–1999	Ruch Chorzów	30	(0)
1999–2001	GKS Katowice	62	(0)
2001–2005	Górnik Zabrze	89	(0)
2005–2008	GKS Bełchatów	33	(0)
2008–2009	Jagiellonia Białystok	22	(0)
2009	Jura Niegowa		
2010–2011	LZS Piotrówka		
2012	Rep. Śląska Oldbojów Katowice		
2013–2015	Polonia Poraj		
2016	Tęcza Błędów	4	(0)

Managerial career
- 2018: Ruch Chorzów (goalkeeping coach)
- * Club domestic league appearances and goals

Piotr Lech (born 18 June 1968) is a Polish former professional footballer who played as a goalkeeper. He currently works as a goalkeeping coach for Ruch Chorzów youth teams.

In 2018, he was announced as Ruch Chorzów's goalkeeping coach.

== Honours ==
Ruch Chorzów

- Ekstraklasa: 1988–89
- Polish Cup: 1995–96

Polonia Poraj

- Regional league Częstochowa: 2013–14
