= Piotr Trafarski =

Polish footballer

Personal information
- Full name: Piotr Trafarski
- Date of birth: 8 May 1983 (age 43)
- Place of birth: Kętrzyn, Poland
- Height: 1.83 m (6 ft 0 in)
- Position: Striker

Team information
- Current team: MKS Korsze
- Number: 69

Senior career*
Years	Team	Apps	(Gls)
2002–2004	MKS Korsze		
2004–2006	Jeziorak Iława		
2006–2008	Olimpia Elbląg	35	(28)
2009	Lechia Gdańsk	1	(0)
2009	Olimpia Elbląg	13	(7)
2010–2012	Termalica Bruk-Bet	57	(8)
2012–	MKS Korsze		
- * Club domestic league appearances and goals as of 8 May 2024

Piotr Trafarski (born 8 May 1983) is a Polish footballer who plays as a striker for MKS Korsze.

== Honours ==
LKS Nieciecza

- II liga East: 2009–10
