= Ina Leukefeld =

German politician

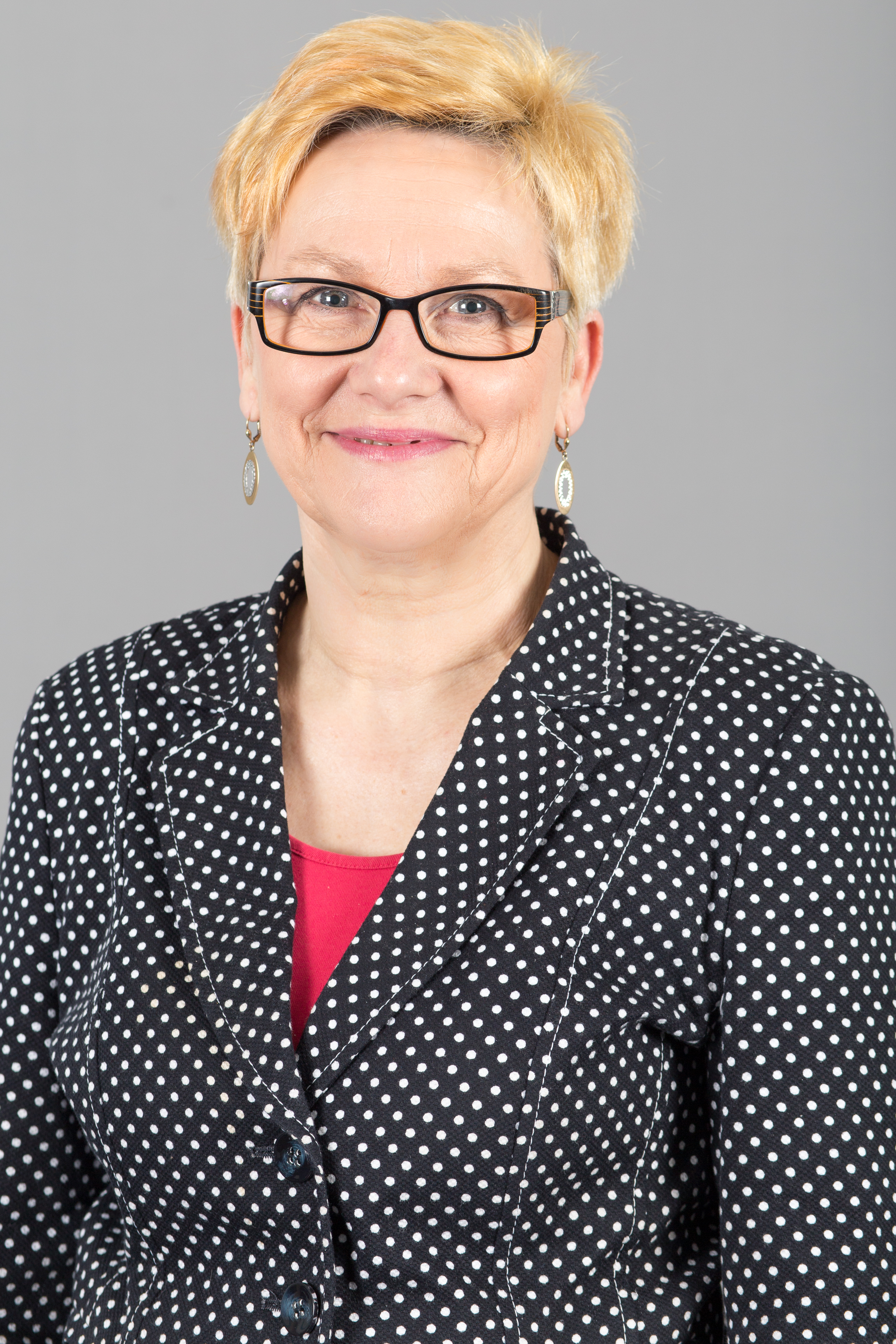
- Leukefeld in 2016

Member of the Landtag of Thuringia for Electoral District 21
- Incumbent
- Assumed office 2004

Personal details
- Born: 12 December 1954 (age 71) Leipzig, East Germany (now Leipzig, Saxony, Germany)
- Party: Die Linke (The Left)
- Children: 2

Ina Leukefeld (born 12 December 1954) is a German politician for Die Linke ("The Left") and a member of the Regional Parliament of Thuringia.

== Life ==
Leukefeld was born in Leipzig. She attended junior and middle school at Ossa near Leipzig and then progressed to the "Extended Secondary School" ("Erweiterte Oberschule" / EOS) in Windischleuba, a short distance to the south. Between 1971 and 1973, she trained and qualified as a finance at tax advisor at Suhl. Between 1973 and 1986, she worked for the town council at Suhl in the sports and youth department, of which after 1983 she became the head. During this time she undertook a remote learning study course with the Weimar based Academy for Public Administration ("Fachschule für Staatswissenschaften") and then with the Academy for National and Legal Sciences in Potsdam-Babelsberg which led, in 1985, to a degree in Public Administration ("Diplomstaatswissenschaftlerin").

During 1985-86, she served as an Informal collaborator, identified in the files as "IM Sonja". She was working not for the Ministry for State Security but for the Criminal Police service K1. It later turned out that the Criminal Police service was, for most purposes, a sub-department of the Ministry for State Security which operated its own vast network of Informal collaborators, as a key pillar of the Surveillance Society that East Germany had become. Later Leukefeld testified that she had not been aware of the close operational connections between the two branches of government and she expressed deep regret over her involvement in the government surveillance network as an Informal collaborator.

The activities became the subject of a parliamentary enquiry which reported in 2006, by which time she was becoming a prominent member of the Regional Parliament ("Landtag") of Thuringia. In May 2006, her unfitness to serve in the parliament (""Parlamentsunwürdigkeit") under the terms of § 1 of Thuringia's "Representatives Verification Law" was established. She remained a parliamentarian and the process rolled on. In July 2009, Thuringia's constitutional court ruled that the earlier decision had been unlawful because the Criminal Police service K1 department, with which Leukefeld had collaborated, was not expressly identified in the version of the relevant law that had been in force in 2006.

Between 1991 and 2004, Leukefeld worked for the regional parliamentarian Gabi Zimmer in her Suhl constituency, as head of Zimmer's election office ("Die Leiterin ihres Wahlkreisbüros").

During 2002/2003, she successfully completed a graduate level course in social work at the Erfurt Academy for Vocational Studies.

Leukefeld has lived in Suhl since 1971 and has been married since 1972. She has two grown-up children.

== Politics ==
Ina Leukefeld was a member of the Free German Youth (Young Communists) in her youth. She joined East Germany's ruling Socialist Unity Party ("Sozialistische Einheitspartei Deutschlands" / SED) in 1975. Between 1986 and 1989, she worked in the party's district leadership team ("Kreisleitung") in her home town, Suhl. As reunification progressed during 1990, the SED began to reinvent itself in preparation for a more democratic future. That year Leukefeld worked in Erfurt and Suhl for the party executive in the Thuringia region for what was now rebranding itself as the Party of Democratic Socialism (PDS). In 1994, she became a member of the municipal council in Suhl. She stood as a candidate for mayor of Suhl in 2006, but the campaigning ahead of the election coincided with the sudden emergence of reports about her activities as a government informer during the dictatorship years, and she failed to secure election.

In 2000, Leukefeld was elected deputy chair of the PDS regional executive for Thuringia, a position which she held until November 2011.

In 2004, she was elected to the Regional Parliament ("Landtag") of Thuringia. She was elected not through the party list but as a direct representative of Electoral District 21 (Suhl, Zella-Mehlis and Oberhof), re-elected most recently in 2014.

The PDS having again, in 2007, been relaunched and rebranded, she is the labour market policy spokesperson in the chamber for Die Linke ("The Left" party). She is a member of the parliamentary committee on work, social affairs, health, women and family. Since 2004 she had also been a member of the Equality Committee. Between 2004 and 2014, she was a member of the committee on the economy, technology and labour.
