= Andreas Bausewein =

German politician and mayor of Erfurt

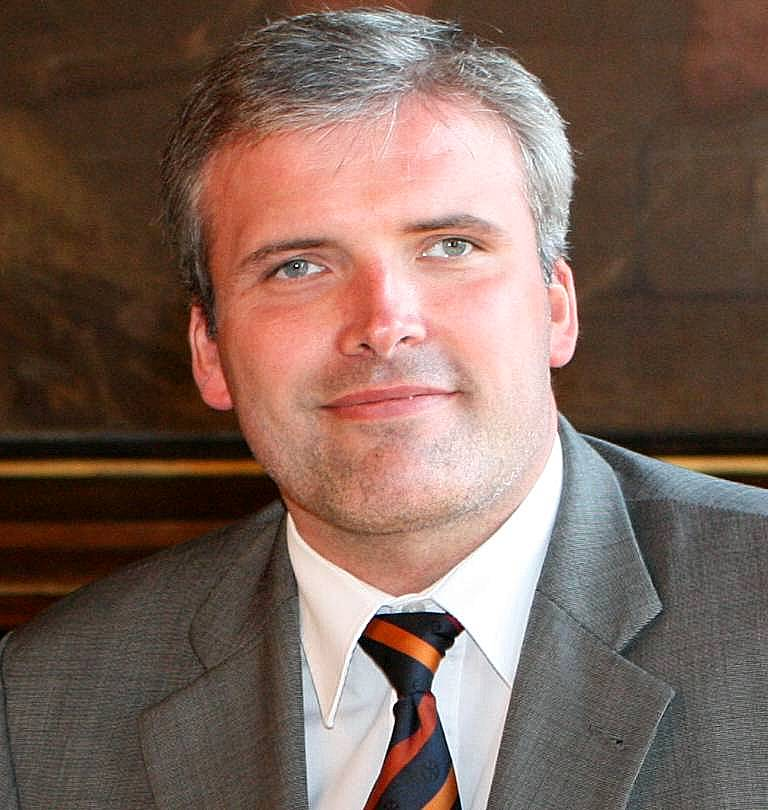
- Andreas Bausewein in 2021

State Secretary for Local Government of Thuringia
- Incumbent
- Assumed office 30 January 2025
- Minister: Georg Maier (politician)

Mayor of Erfurt
- In office 1 July 2006 – 30 June 2024
- Preceded by: Manfred Ruge
- Succeeded by: Andreas Horn

Member of the Landtag of Thuringia
- In office 2004–2006

Personal details
- Born: 5 May 1973 (age 53) Erfurt, East Germany
- Party: Social Democratic Party (SPD)
- Spouse: Sysann Bausewein (m. 1995; div. 2018)
- Children: 3
- Education: Erfurt University of Applied Sciences

Andreas Bausewein (born 5 May 1973) is a German politician of the Social Democratic Party (SPD) who served as the mayor of Erfurt from 2006 until 2024.

== Education ==
After his schooling at the "Johannes Gutenberg" polytechnic high school in Erfurt, Bausewein completed an apprenticeship as an electrician from 1989 to 1993. He then obtained a university entrance qualification. After completing his community service with the Erfurt Workers' Samaritan Association, he worked for a year in the Thuringia SPD parliamentary group in 1995. From 1995 to 1999, he studied at the Erfurt University of Applied Sciences and graduated as a social worker/social pedagogue (FH). He completed a postgraduate course at the Erfurt University of Education/Erfurt University in 2002 as a qualified pedagogue. From 1996 to 2002, he was a scholarship holder of the Hans Böckler Foundation.

From 2002 to 2003, Bausewein worked as a social pedagogue at the vocational training center in the Tonna correctional facility. He then worked as a qualification coordinator at the German Trade Union Confederation Thuringia.

== Political career ==
In 1990 Bausewein joined the SPD. From 1995 to 2004 he was state chairman of the party's youth organization, the Young Socialists, in Thuringia. Since 1994 he was a member of the board of the Thuringian SPD. From 1998 to 2008 and again since 2010, he is Deputy Chairman of the State party. From 2004 until 2006 Bausewein was a member of the Landtag of Thuringia.

In May 2006, Bausewein won Erfurt’s mayoral election runoff against Dietrich Hagemann (CDU) with 60.2% of the vote (30.9% voter turnout).

During the vote for a new SPD State Executive Committee on 7 June 2008, Bausewein was not re-elected. The main reason for this was that he was involved in an internal party struggle between the current chairman Christoph Matschie and his predecessor Richard Dewes for the position of chairman. At the party convention on 6 March 2010, Bausewein was elected with 57 percent of votes in favour for the second time as one of the four vice-chairpersons of the state party. Bausewein scored the worst result of the candidates for the position of deputy national chairman.

== Other activities ==
=== Corporate boards ===
- Helaba, Alternate Member of the Supervisory Board
- SWE Stadtwerke Erfurt, Ex-Officio Chairman of the Supervisory Board

=== Non-profit organizations ===
- Christivall22, Member of the Board of Trustees

== Personal life ==
From 2003 until 2018, Bausewein was married to his wife Sysann. They have three children.

== See also ==
- List of Social Democratic Party of Germany politicians
