= Elisabet Boehm =

German writer and feminist, editor

Elisabet Boehm (née Steppuhn) (27 September 1861 – 30 May 1943) was a German feminist, writer, founder of the first Landwirtschaftlichen Hausfrauenvereins ("Agricultural Housewives' Society") and the founder of the rural women's movement in general.

== Biography ==
Elisabet Steppuhn was born in Rastenburg, East Prussia, and married landowner Otto Boehm in 1880. She formed the first Landwirtschaftlichen Hausfrauenvereins, initially with fifteen members, in Rastenburg in 1898. The society's objectives were to promote educational and training opportunities, recognition of housework as professional work, bridging the gap between urban and rural and practical matters, such as improvement of production and sales in the agricultural sector.

Further societies with the same objective were established, and in 1905 Boehm was elected Chairman of the newly established East Prussian Society. By 1916 the Reichsbund Landwirtschaftlicher Hausfrauenvereine ("Reich Federation of Agricultural Housewives' Societies") had emerged, of which Boehm was Chairman until 1929.

Boehm was also concerned with women's vocational training and in 1912, she founded the first Landwirtschaftliche Frauenschule ("Rural Women's School").

== Publications ==
Translator's note: These are in German.

- Elisabet Boehm; Dr. W. Borgmann; E. A. Brödermann; Dr. H. Bade u.a.: Illustriertes Landwirtschafts-Lexikon ("Illustrated Encyclopaedia of Agriculture"). 2 Bände. Hrsg. v. P. Gisevius. 5., neubearbeitete Auflage. Berlin: Verlagsbuchhandlung Paul Parey, 1920, 625 und 558 Seiten; 6., neubearb. Auflage, 1923
- Die deutsche Landfrau und ihr Wirken in Haus und Vaterland ("The German Woman and her Work for Home and Fatherland"). Berlin: Paul Parey, 1924, 181 S.; 2., neubearbeitete Auflage 1927, 183 S. (Enthält eine Vielzahl von Tips für Haus und Hof, u.a. zur Geflügelzucht, der Imkerei, dem Obstbau, dem Reinemachen, der Gastlichkeit, Nachbarschaftspflege, der sozialen Arbeit...)
- Wie ich dazu kam! (loosely, "How I got there!") Berlin: Reichsnährstand Verlags-GmbH, 1941, 60 S.

== Sources ==
- Christina Schwarz: Elisabet Boehm und der landwirtschaftliche Hausfrauenverein. Im Zeichen der Biene ("Elisabet Boehm and the Agricultural Housewives' Society: Beneath the Bee"). Hamburg: Landsmannschaft Ostpreußen, Abteilung Kultur, 1991, 56 S (in German)
