= Siegfried Tiefensee =

German musician and conductor

Siegfried Tiefensee (20 October 1922 – 24 March 2009) was a German musician and conductor.

Siegfried Tiefensee was born in Rastenburg, East Prussia, he started his artistic education in his early youth and learned piano, violin and composing. In 1947 he passed his exam as a music teacher and in 1951 his state examination as a conductor.

Tiefensee became the Kapellmeister at the theaters of Stendal (1951–1954), Gera (1954–1958) and Leipzig (1958-1990). In Leipzig he became the head of the section "drama music" at the "Theater der Jungen Welt" and composed several musical works for stages, TV and filmmusic. His works, such as the children's opera Cipollino, were published by the Friedrich Hofmeister Musikverlag.

Tiefensee was the father of four children, one of them the German politician Wolfgang Tiefensee. Tiefensee died in Leipzig.

== Works ==
- Cipollino, Ein Spiel für Kinder/Kinderoper, 1959
- Katz und Kätzchen, Oper für Kinder, 1960
- Schneewittchen, DEFA-Film, 1961
- Das Pinguinei, Musical für Kinder, 1962
- Adrian und das rote Auto, Kinderoper, 1966
- Mascha und der Bär, Kinderballett, 1968
- Die Zauberer sind da, Märchenstück mit Musik, 1968
- Rotkäppchen, Märchenstück mit Musik, 1968
- Das Rübchen, Märchenstück mit Musik, 1971
- Der neue Struwwelpeter, Musikalisches Bilderbuch /Kinderoper, 1972
- Vom Äffchen, das eine Brille trug, 1973
- Die Geschichte vom tapferen Schneiderlein, Kinderballett, 1978
- Die Bremer Stadtmusikanten, Märchenstück mit Musik, 1980
- Maus und Kater im Theater, Ein Spiel für zwei Darsteller mit viel Musik, 1984

== Literature ==
- Siegfried Tiefensee in: „Oper heute“, Almanach Nr. 1, Henschelverlag 1978
- Eberhard Rebling: Ballett A – Z, Henschelverlag 1980
- Brigitte Regler-Bellinger: Internationales Musiktheater für Kinder und Jugendliche, Frankfurt a. M. 1990 (pp 427 – 436)
- Die Musik in Geschichte und Gegenwart (MGG), ed. Ludwig Finscher, Sachteil Band 5, 1996, 2. neubearb. Ausgabe, Stichwort „Kinder- und Jugendmusiktheater“ (Brigitte Regler-Bellinger), p. 48, 49
