= Diana Lehmann =

German politician (born 1983)

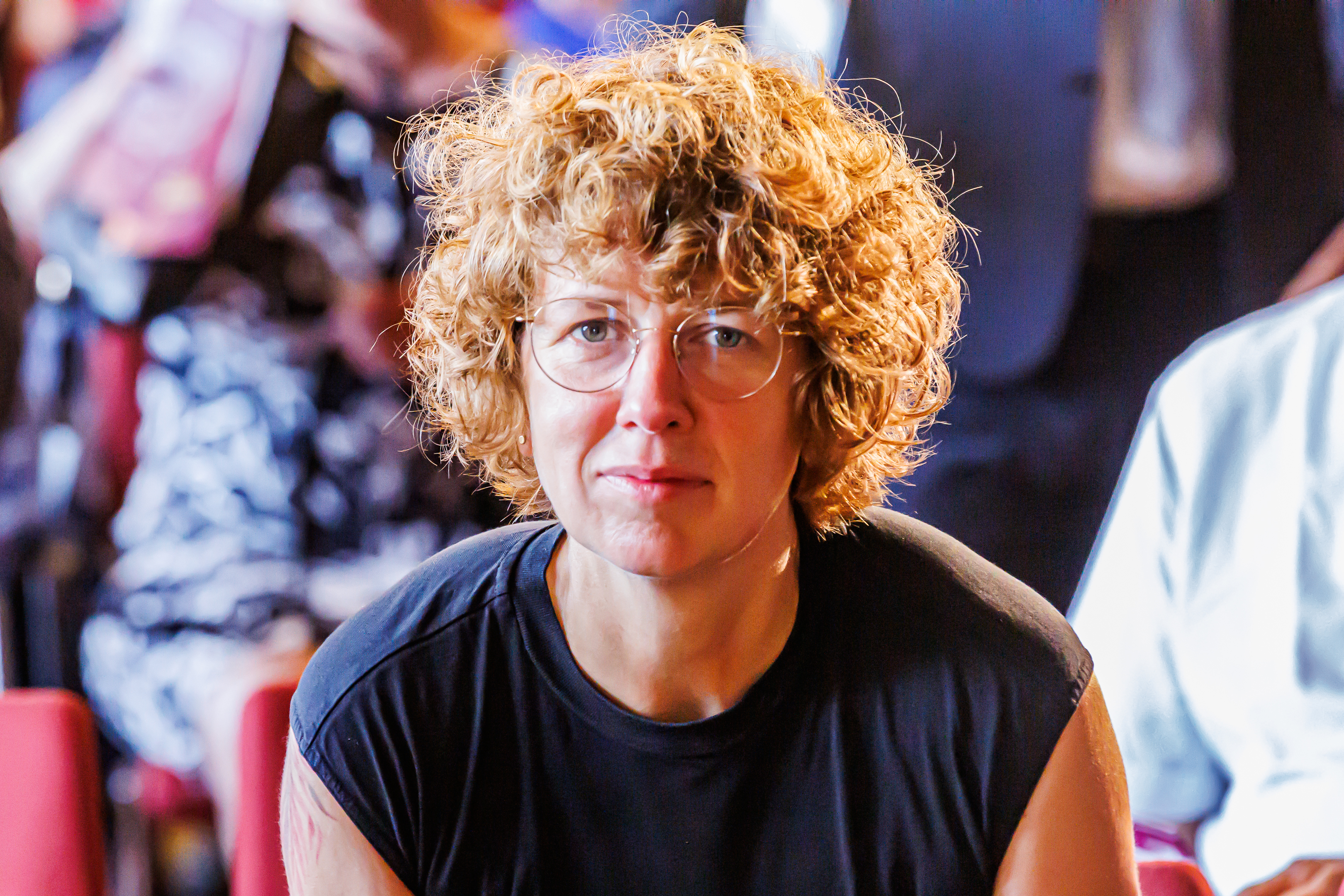
- Lehmann in 2024

Member of the Landtag of Thuringia
- In office 14 October 2014 – 26 September 2024

Personal details
- Born: 23 June 1983 (age 42)
- Party: Social Democratic Party (since 2006)

Diana Lehmann (born 23 June 1983) is a German politician. From 2014 to 2024, she was a member of the Landtag of Thuringia. From 2023 to 2024, she served as vice president of the Landtag.
