= Jena =

City in Germany

- City
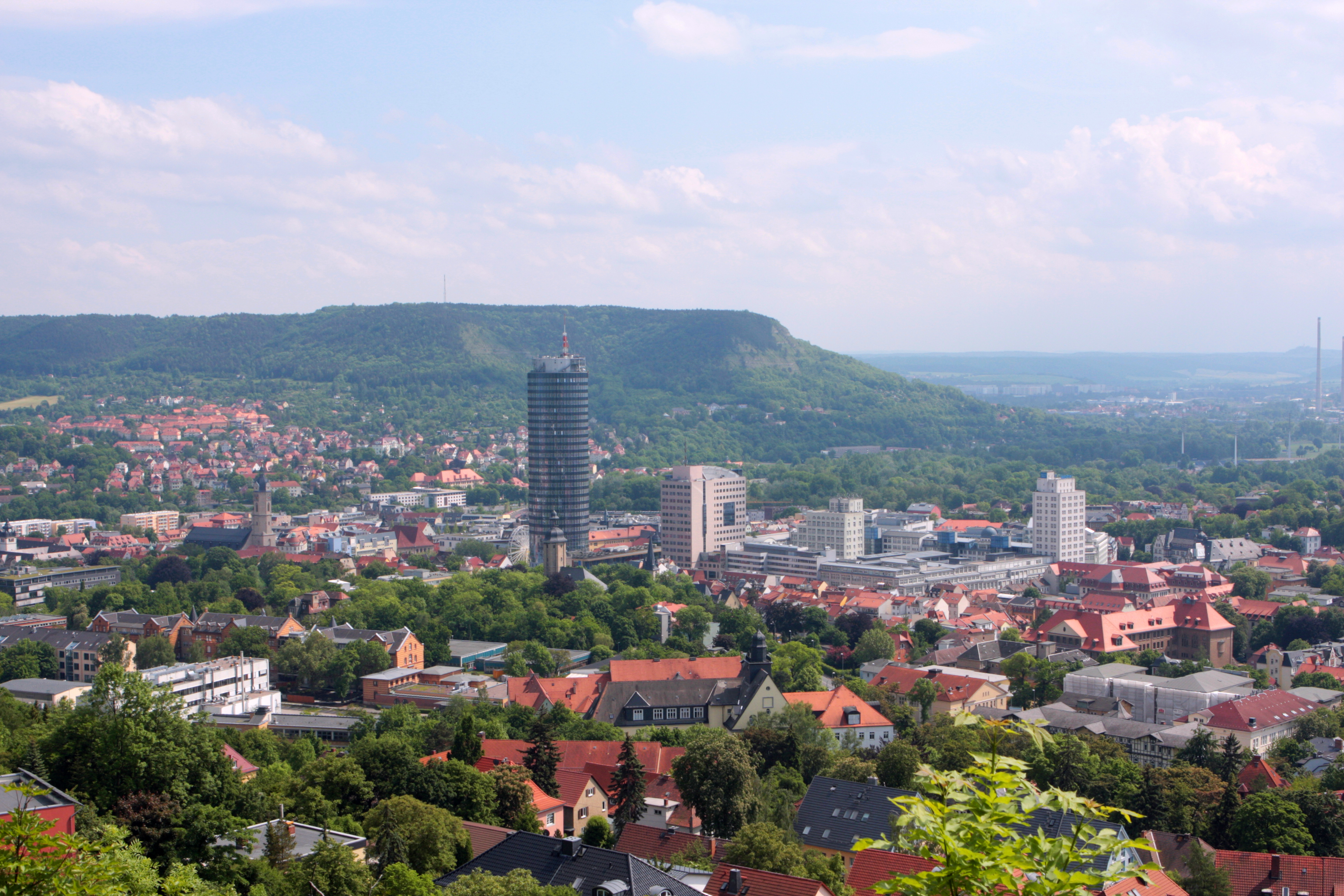
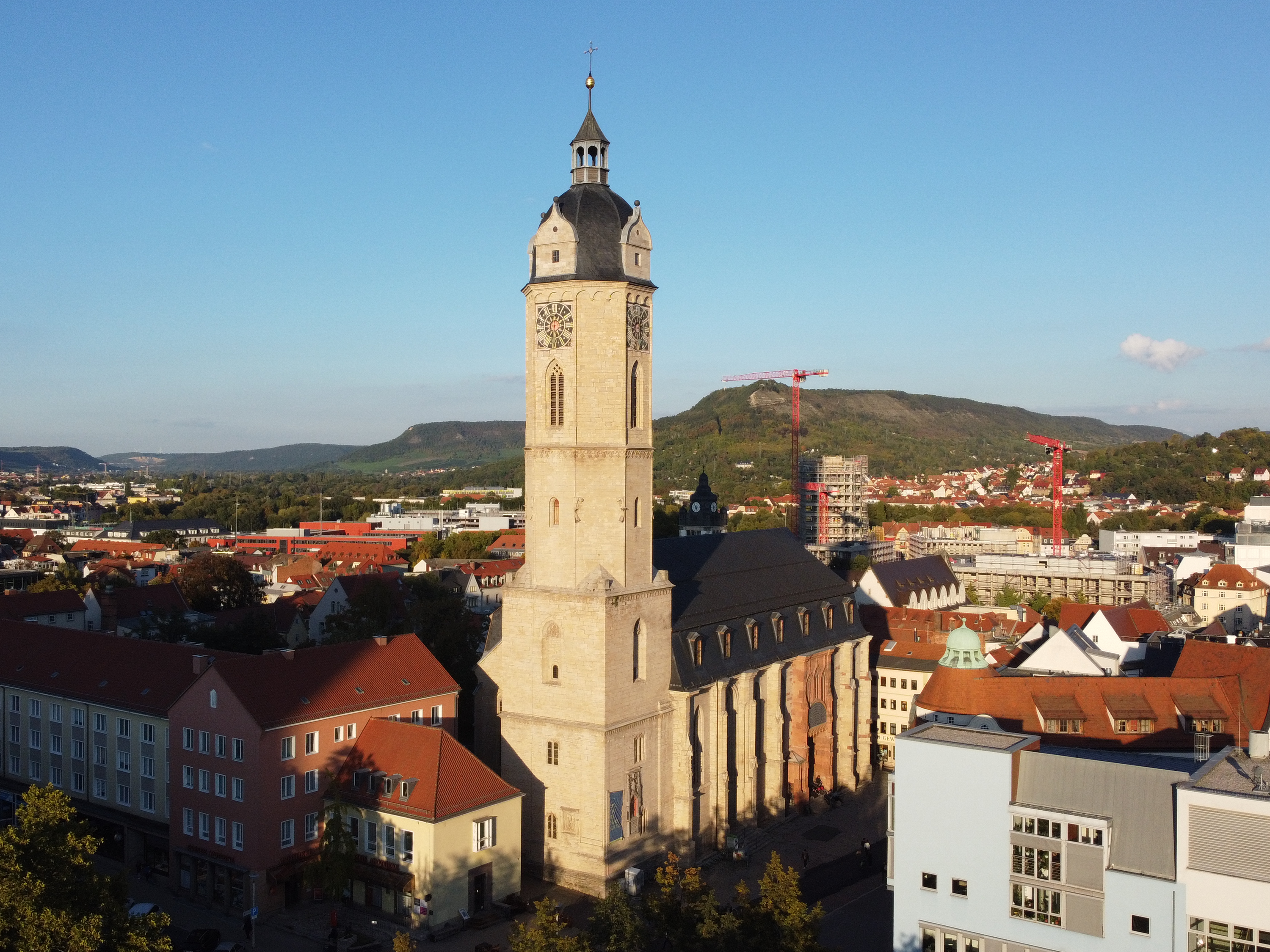
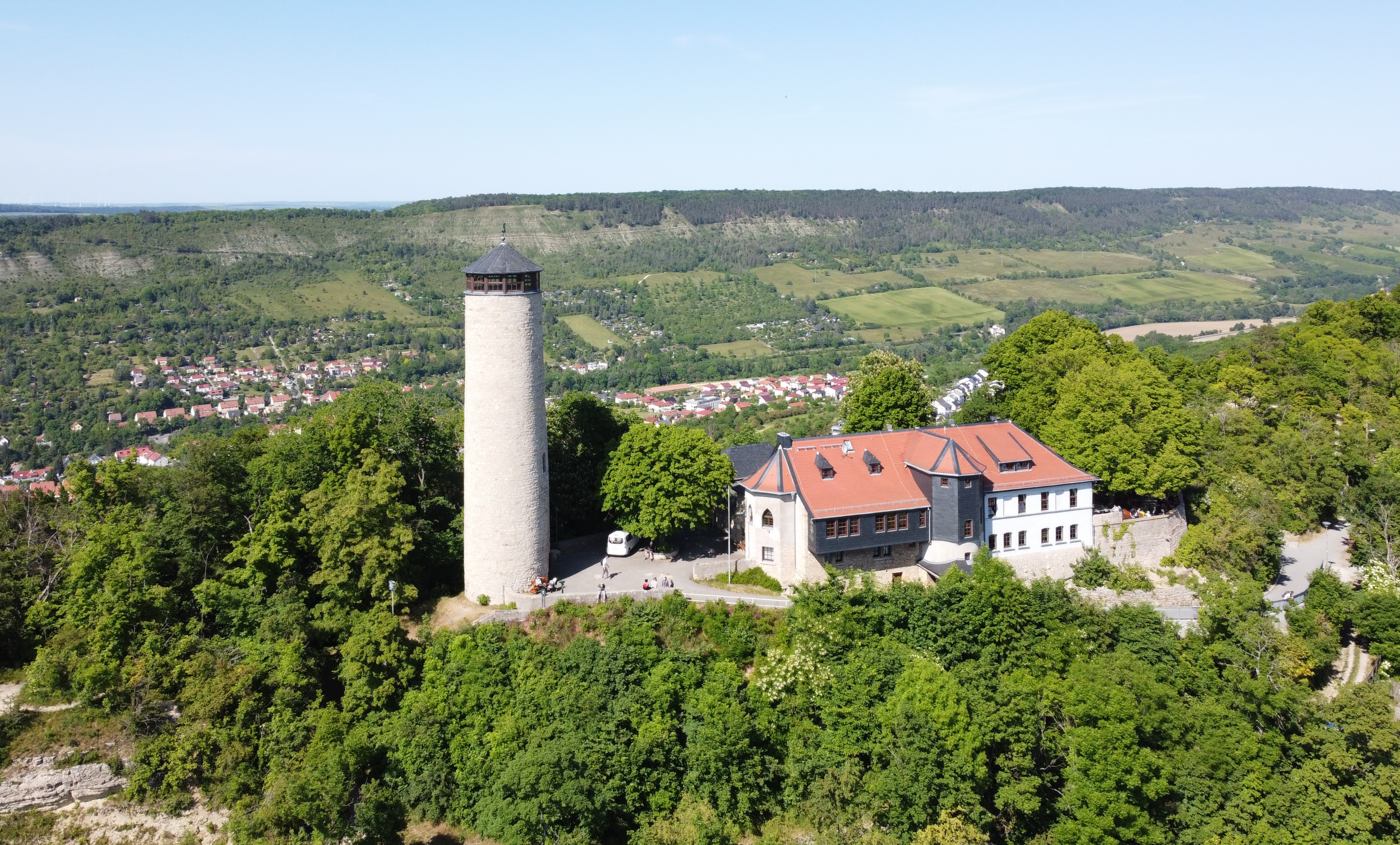
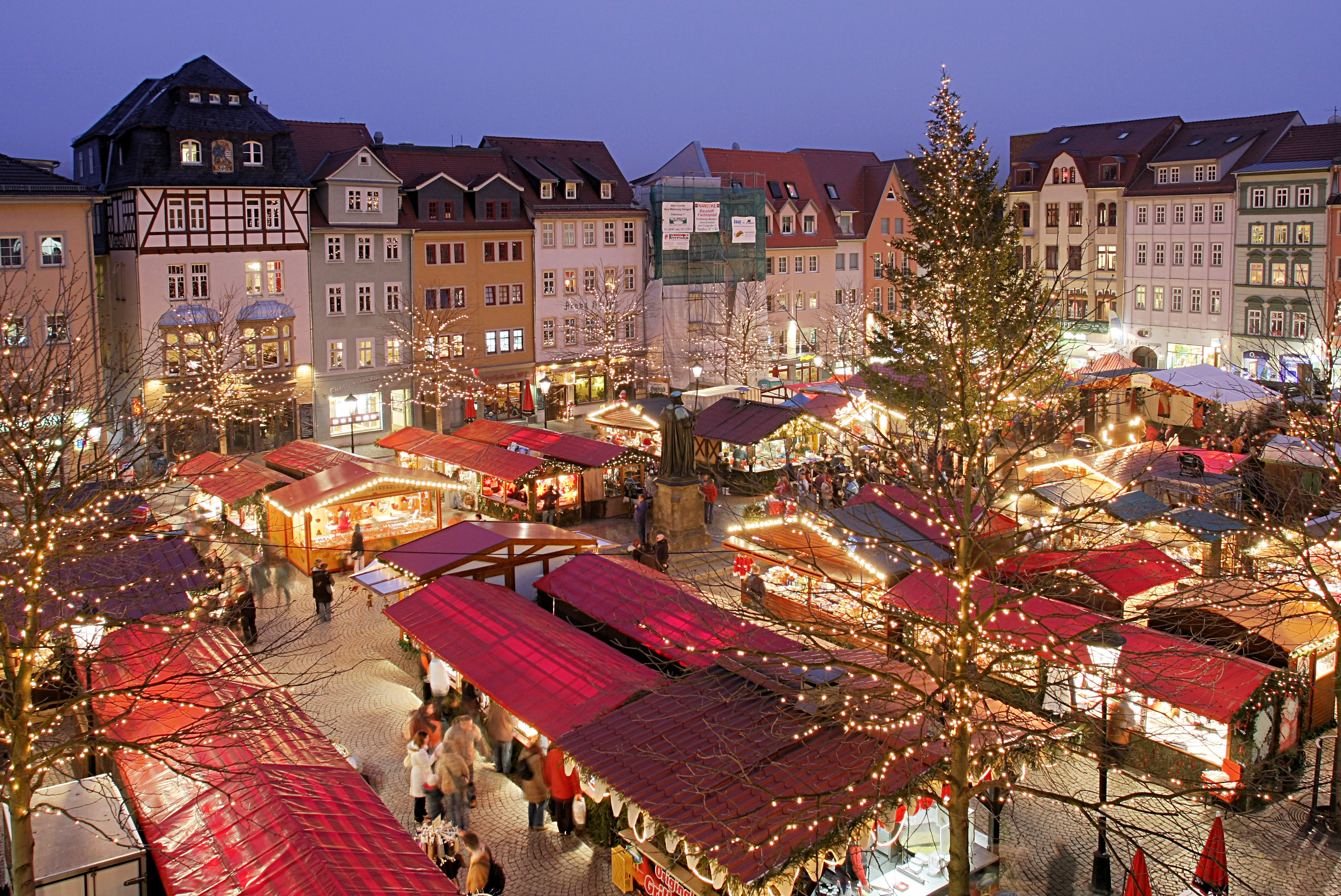
- Jena skyline (2008) St. Michael Fox tower on the Hausberg mountain Marketplace

- Flag Coat of arms

- Location of Jena within Thuringia
- Interactive map of Jena
- Location within Germany Location within Thuringia
- Coordinates: 50°55′38″N 11°35′10″E
- Country: Germany
- State: Thuringia
- District: Urban district

Government
  - Mayor (2024–30): Thomas Nitzsche (FDP)

Area
  - Total: 114.76 km^{2} (44.31 sq mi)
- Elevation: 143 m (469 ft)

Population (2025-12-31)
  - Total: 109,725
  - Density: 956.13/km^{2} (2,476.4/sq mi)
- Time zone: UTC+01:00 (CET)
  - Summer (DST): UTC+02:00 (CEST)
- Postal codes: 07743–07751
- Dialling codes: 03641, 036425
- Vehicle registration: J
- Website: www.jena.de

Jena (/ˈjeɪnə/; German: [ˈjeːna]) is a city in Germany and the second largest city in Thuringia. Together with the nearby cities of Erfurt and Weimar, it forms the central metropolitan area of Thuringia with approximately 500,000 inhabitants, while the city itself has a population of about 110,000. Jena is a centre of education and research. The University of Jena (Friedrich Schiller University) was founded in 1558 and had 18,000 students in 2017 and the Ernst-Abbe-Hochschule Jena serves another 5,000 students. Furthermore, there are many institutes of the leading German research societies.

Jena was first mentioned in 1182 and stayed a small town until the 19th century, when industry developed. For most of the 20th century, Jena was a world centre of the optical industry around companies such as Carl Zeiss, Schott and Jenoptik (since 1990). As one of only a few medium-sized cities in Germany, it has some high-rise buildings in the city centre, such as the JenTower. These also have their origin in the former Carl Zeiss factory.

Between 1790 and 1850, Jena was a focal point of the German Vormärz as well as of the student liberal and unification movement and German Romanticism. Notable persons of this period in Jena were Friedrich Schiller, Alexander von Humboldt, Johann Gottlieb Fichte, Georg Wilhelm Friedrich Hegel, Novalis, August Wilhelm Schlegel, and Arthur Schopenhauer.

Jena's economy is largely built upon its high-technology infrastructure and research. The precision optical instruments industry is its leading branch to date, although software engineering, other digital businesses, and biotechnology are of growing importance. Furthermore, Jena is also a service hub for its regional environs.

Jena lies in a hilly landscape in the east of Thuringia, within the wide valley of the Saale river. Due to its rocky landscape, varied substrate and mixed forests, Jena is known in Germany for the wide variety of wild orchids, which can be found within walking distance of the town. Local nature reserves are maintained by volunteers and NABU.

== History ==
=== Middle Ages ===
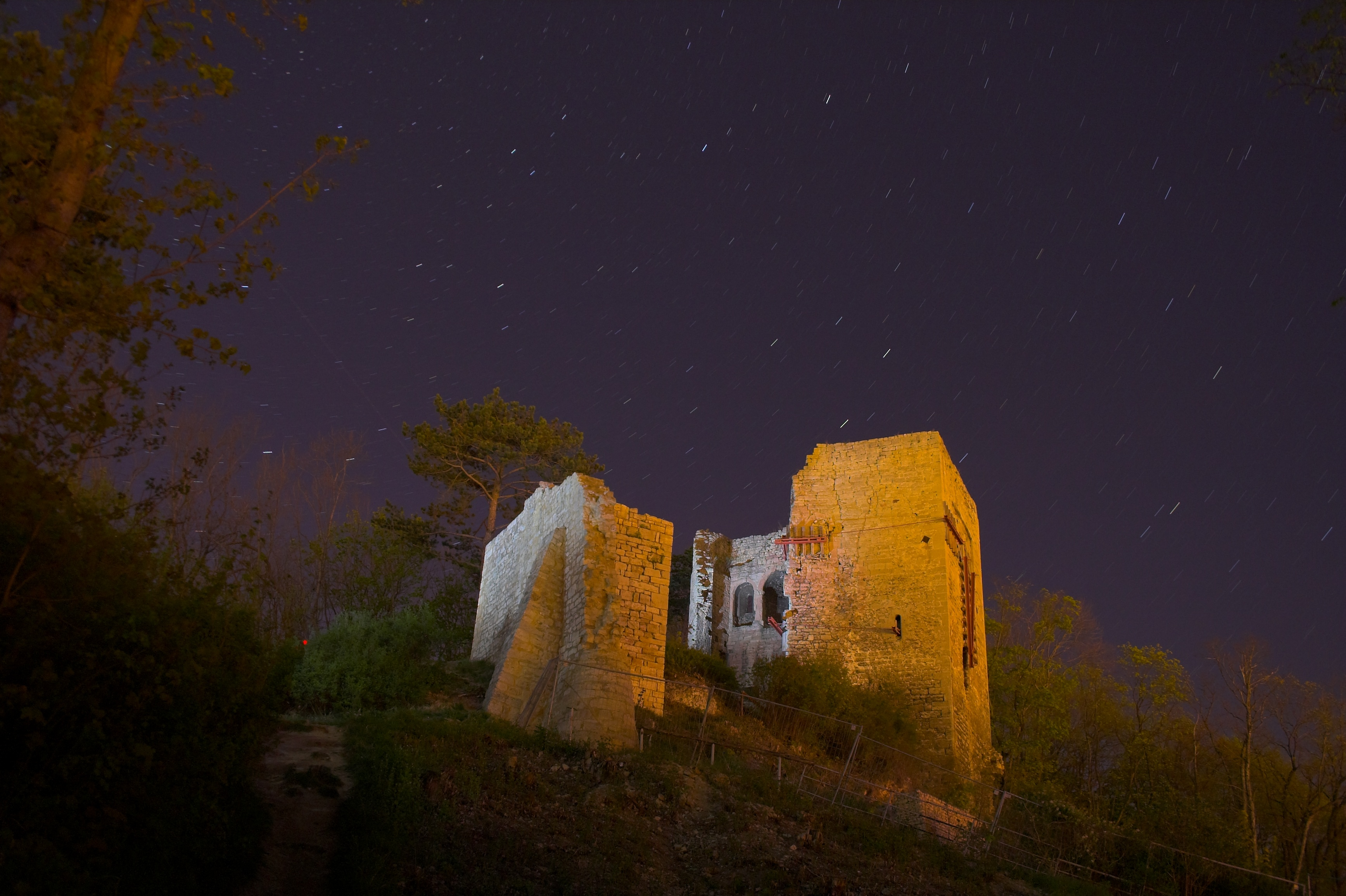
Lobdeburg Castle ruins above Lobeda district

Until the High Middle Ages, the Saale was the border between Germanic regions in the west and Slavic regions in the east. Owing to its function as a river crossing, Jena was conveniently located. Nevertheless, there were also some more important Saale crossings such as the nearby cities of Naumburg to the north and Saalfeld to the south, so that the relevance of Jena was more local during the Middle Ages. The first unequivocal mention of Jena was in an 1182 document. The first local rulers of the region were the Lords of Lobdeburg with their eponymous castle near Lobeda, roughly 6 km (4 mi) south of the city centre on the eastern hillside of the Saale valley.

In the 13th century, the Lords of Lobdeburg founded two towns in the valley: Jena on the west bank and Lobeda – which is one of Jena's constituent communities today – 4 km (2 mi) to the south on the east bank. Around 1230, Jena received town rights and a regular city grid was established between today's Fürstengraben, Löbdergraben, Teichgraben and Leutragraben. The city got a marketplace, main church, town hall, council and city walls during the late 13th and early 14th centuries making it into a full-fledged town. In this time, the city's economy was based mainly on wine production on the warm and sunny hillsides of the Saale valley. The two monasteries of the Dominicans (1286) and the Cistercians (1301) rounded out Jena's medieval appearance.

As the political circumstances in Thuringia changed in the middle of the 14th century, the weakened Lords of Lobdeburg sold Jena to the aspiring Wettins in 1331. Jena obtained the Gotha municipal law and the citizens strengthened their rights and wealth during the 14th and 15th centuries. Moreover, the Wettins were more interested in their residence in the nearby city of Weimar, and so Jena could develop itself relatively autonomously.

=== Early modern period ===
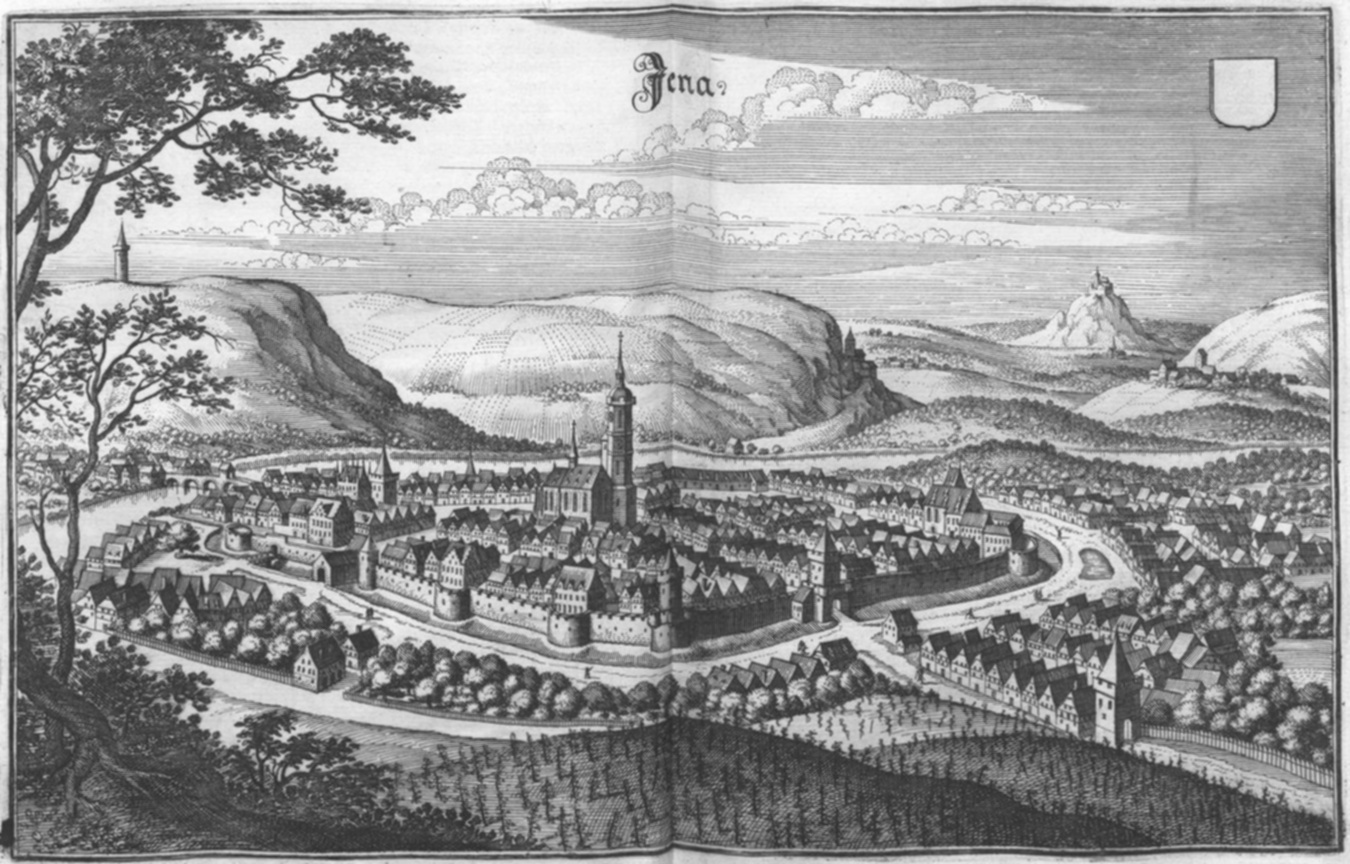
Jena in 1650

The Protestant Reformation was brought to the city in 1523. Martin Luther visited the town to reorganize the clerical relations and Jena became an early centre of his doctrine. In the following years, the Dominican and the Carmelite convents were attacked by the townsmen and abolished in 1525 (Carmelite) and 1548 (Dominican).

An important step in Jena's history was the foundation of the university in 1558. Ernestine Elector John Frederick the Magnanimous founded it, because he had lost his old university in Wittenberg to the Albertines after the Schmalkaldic War. During the Little Ice Age, wine-growing declined in the 17th century, so that the new university became one of the most important sources of income for the city. The same century brought a boom in printing business caused by the rising importance of books (and the population's ability to read) in the Lutheran doctrine, and Jena was the second-largest printing location in Germany after Leipzig.

The list of the so-called "Seven Wonders of Jena" was composed by students of the university at this time, supposedly as a test of local knowledge in order to confirm that a person who claimed to have studied in Jena was actually familiar with the city.

Beginning in the 16th century, the Ernestine dynasty saw many territorial partitions. Initially, Jena remained a part of Saxe-Weimar, but in 1672 it became the capital of its own small duchy (Saxe-Jena). In 1692, after two dukes (Bernhard II and Johann Wilhelm), the dukes of Saxe-Jena died out and the duchy became part of Saxe-Eisenach and, in 1741, of the Duchy of Saxe-Weimar, to which it belonged until 1809. From 1809 to 1918, Jena was part of the Duchy (from 1815 Grand Duchy) of Saxe-Weimar-Eisenach, which from 1871 was also part of the German Empire.

=== 18th century ===
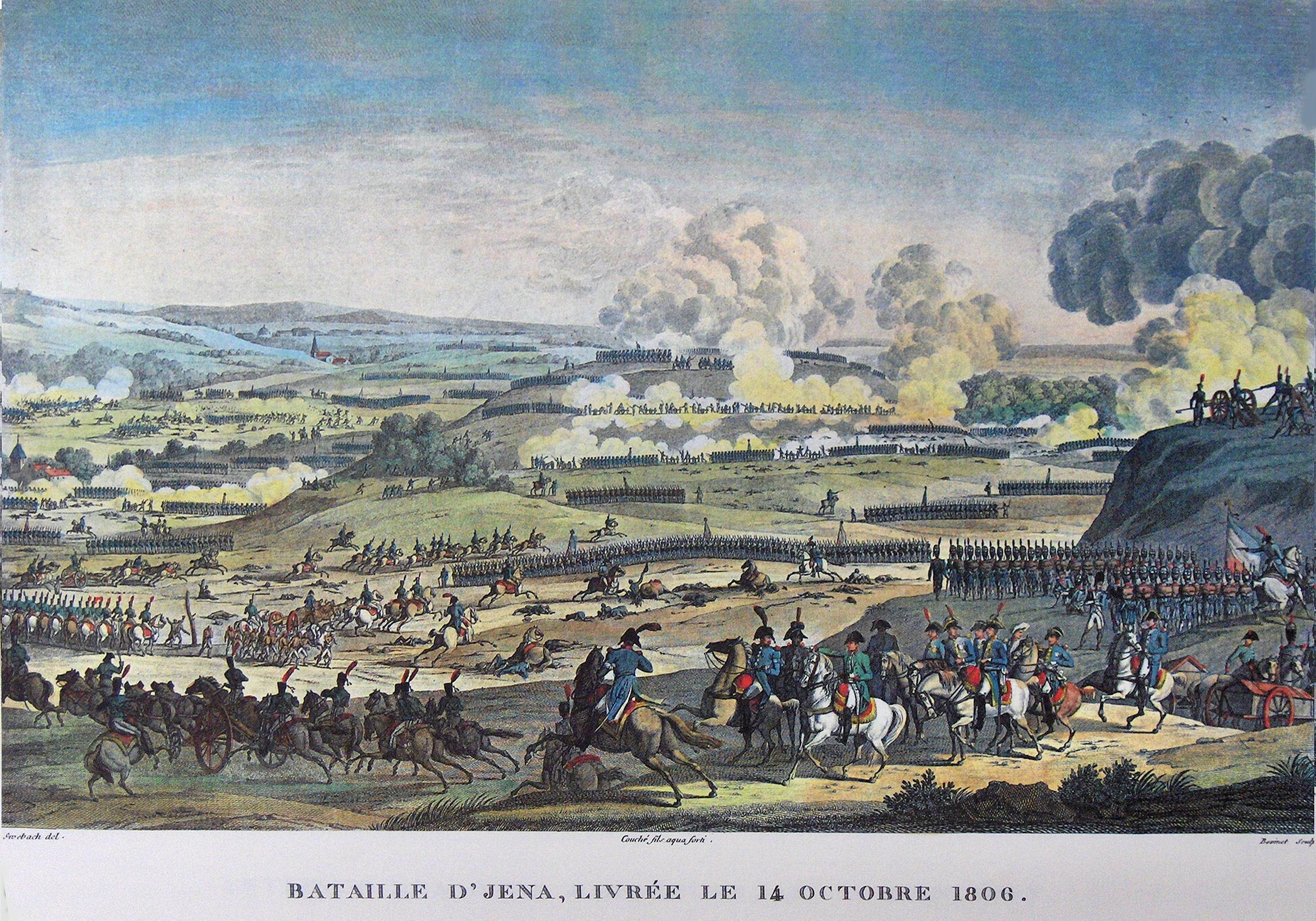
The battle of Jena in 1806

Around 1790, the university became the largest and most famous one among the German states and made Jena the centre of the idealist philosophy of ‘Ich' (German for "I" or "self") with professors such as Johann Gottlieb Fichte, Georg Wilhelm Friedrich Hegel, Friedrich Schiller, and Friedrich Wilhelm Joseph Schelling. This period gave rise to Jena Romanticism, the first phase of German Romanticism, with a group led by Caroline Schlegel, and poets such as Novalis, the brothers August and Friedrich Schlegel, and Ludwig Tieck.

In 1794, the poets Goethe and Schiller met at the university and established a long lasting friendship, based on their love of Shakespeare. Consequently, the reputation of the university and the Duchy of Saxe-Weimar-Eisenach as liberal, open-minded, and focused on the self, was established and enhanced.

=== 19th century ===
On 14 October 1806, Napoleon fought and defeated the Prussian army here in the Battle of Jena-Auerstedt, near the district of Vierzehnheiligen. Resistance against the French occupation was strong, especially among the students. Many of the students fought in the Lützow Free Corps in 1813. Two years later, the Urburschenschaft fraternity was founded in the city.

During the later 19th century, the famous biologist Ernst Haeckel was professor at the university. The expansion of science and medicine faculties was closely linked to the industrial boom that Jena saw after 1871. The initial spark of industrialization in Jena was the (relatively late) connection to the railway. The Saal Railway (Saalbahn, opened in 1874) was the connection from Halle and Leipzig along the Saale valley to Nuremberg and the Weimar–Gera railway (opened 1876) connected Jena with Frankfurt and Erfurt in the west as well as Dresden and Gera in the east. Famous pioneers of the Jenaer industry were Carl Zeiss and Ernst Abbe (with their Carl Zeiss AG) as well as Otto Schott (Schott AG). Since that time, production of optical items, precision machinery and laboratory glassware have been the main branches of Jena's economy; Jena glass is even named after the city. Zeiss, Abbe and Schott worked also as social reformers who wanted to improve the living conditions of their workers and the local wealth in general. When Zeiss died in 1889, his company passed to the Carl-Zeiss-Stiftung, which uses great amounts of the company's profits for social benefits such as research projects at universities etc. This model became an example for other German companies (e.g. the Robert Bosch Stiftung). In 1898 it was agreed on with several personalities from the Jenaer industrial sector that the city was in need of an electricity generator and in the first years of the 1900s an electrified tramway was founded in Jena.

=== 20th century ===
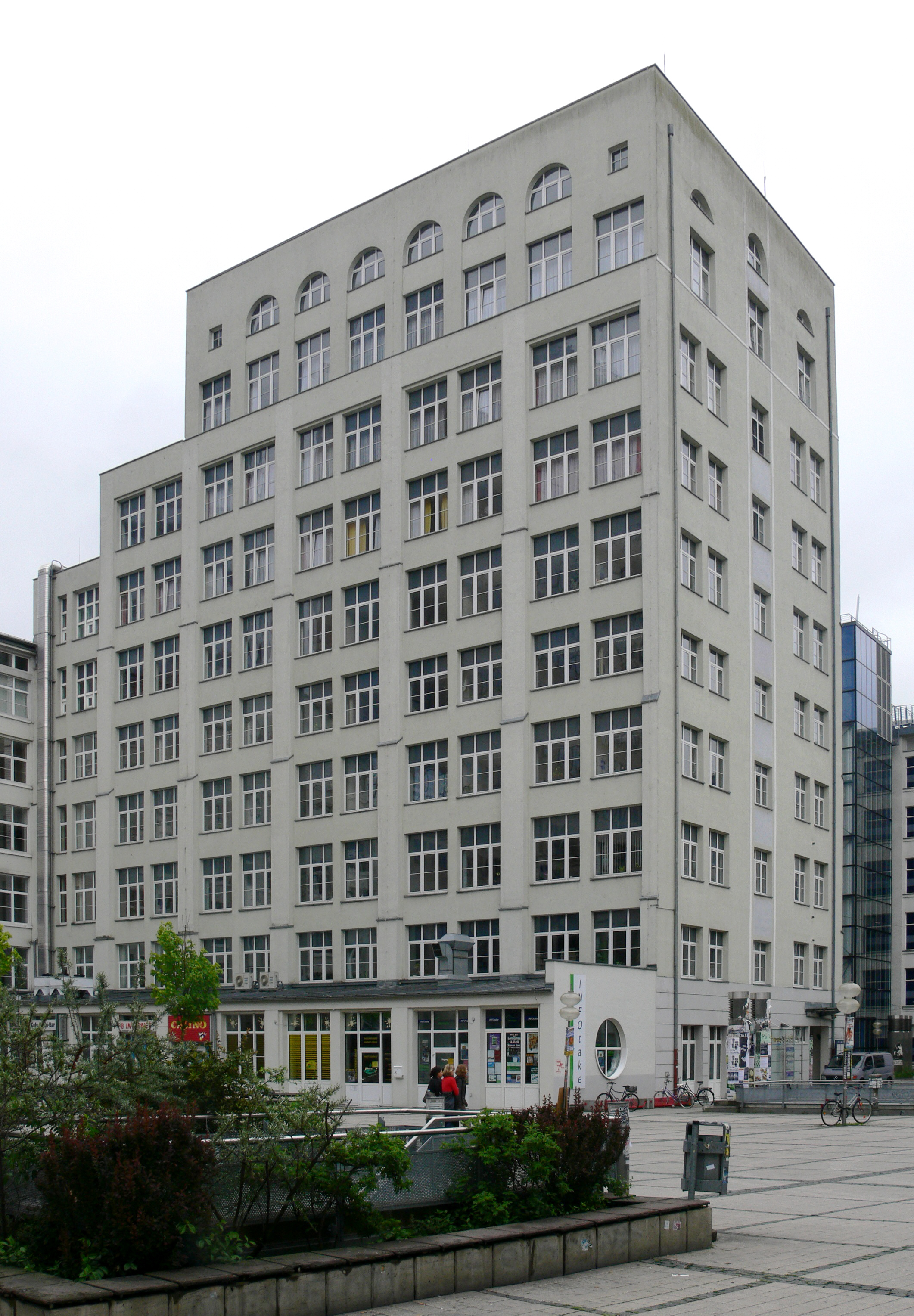
Bau 15 of the Carl Zeiss factory, Germany's first high-rise building, established in 1915

Industrialization fundamentally changed the social structure of Jena. The former academic town became a working-class city; the population rose from 8,000 around 1870 to 71,000 at the beginning of World War II. The city expanded along the Saale valley to the north and the south and its side valleys to the east and the west. In 1901, the tram system started its operation and the university got a new main building (established between 1906 and 1908 on the former castle's site). After the foundation of Thuringia in 1920, Jena was one of the three biggest cities (together with Weimar and Gera, while Erfurt remained part of Prussia) and became an independent city in 1922. The modern optical and glass industry kept booming and the city grew further during Weimar times.

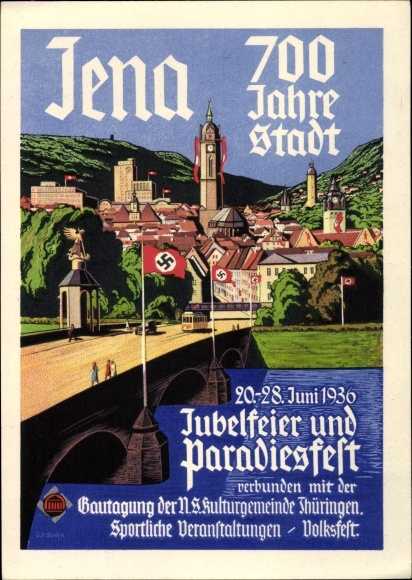
1936 poster marking the 700th anniversary of the city of Jena

During the Nazi period, conflicts deepened in Jena between the influential left-wing milieus (communists and social democrats) and the right-wing Nazi milieus. On the one hand, the university suffered from new restrictions against its independence, but on the other hand, it consolidated the Nazi ideology, for example with a professorship of social anthropology (which sought to scientifically legitimize the racial policy of Nazi Germany). The November pogrom in 1938 led to more discrimination against Jews in Jena, many of whom either emigrated or were arrested and murdered by the German government. This weakened the academic milieu, because many academics were Jews (especially in medicine). During World War II, the Germans operated two subcamps of the Buchenwald concentration camp in the city, and a subcamp of the prison in Sieradz in German-occupied Poland.

In 1945, toward the end of World War II, Jena was repeatedly targeted by Allied bombing raids. 709 people were killed, 2,000 injured, and most of the medieval town centre was destroyed; later parts restored after the end of the war. No other Thuringian city suffered worse damage, except Nordhausen, whose destruction was utter. Today, much of the city consists of buildings from before World War II. Jena was occupied by American troops on 13 April 1945 and was left to the Red Army on 1 July 1945.

Jena fell within the Soviet zone of occupation in post-World War II Germany. In 1949, it became part of the new German Democratic Republic (GDR). The Soviets dismantled great parts of the Zeiss and Schott factories and took them to the Soviet Union. On the other hand, the GDR government founded a new pharmaceutical factory in 1950, Jenapharm, which is part of Bayer today. In 1953, Jena was a centre of the East German Uprising against GDR policy. The protests with 30,000 participants drew fire from Soviet tanks.

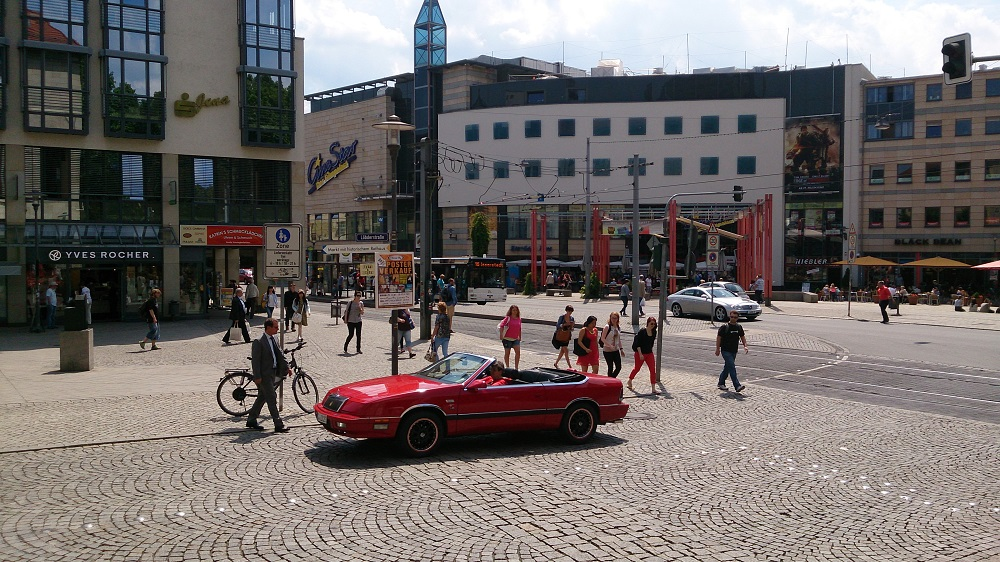
The "Holzmarkt" in the city centre

The following decades brought some radical shifts in city planning. During the 1960s, another part of the historic city centre was demolished to build the Jen Tower. The Eichplatz in front of the tower is still unbuilt and its future is still the subject of ongoing heated discussion. Big Plattenbau settlements were developed in the 1970s and 1980s, because the population was still rising and the housing shortage remained a perpetual problem. New districts established in the north (near Rautal) and in the south (around Winzerla and Lobeda). The opposition against the GDR government was reinforced during the late 1980s in Jena, fed by academic and clerical circles. In autumn 1989, the city saw the largest protests in its history before the GDR government was dissolved.

After 1990, Jena became part of the refounded state of Thuringia. Industry came into a heavy crisis during the 1990s, but finally it managed the transition to the market economy and today, it is one of the leading economic centres of eastern Germany. Furthermore, the university was enlarged and many new research institutes were founded.

Especially between 1995 and 1997 several far-right crimes were committed in Jena. The city's far-right scene of the 1990s gave rise to the National Socialist Underground (NSU) terror group. However, the city is no longer considered a far-right hotspot.

== Geography and demographics ==
Historical population
Year	Pop.	±%
1490	3,800	—
1784	4,366	+14.9%
1871	8,260	+89.2%
1900	20,677	+150.3%
1910	38,487	+86.1%
1919	48,847	+26.9%
1925	52,649	+7.8%
1933	58,357	+10.8%
1939	70,632	+21.0%
1950	80,309	+13.7%
1964	84,307	+5.0%
1970	88,130	+4.5%
1981	104,946	+19.1%
1991	100,967	−3.8%
2001	101,157	+0.2%
2011	105,739	+4.5%
2022	110,369	+4.4%
Population size may be affected by changes in administrative divisions. source:

=== Topography ===
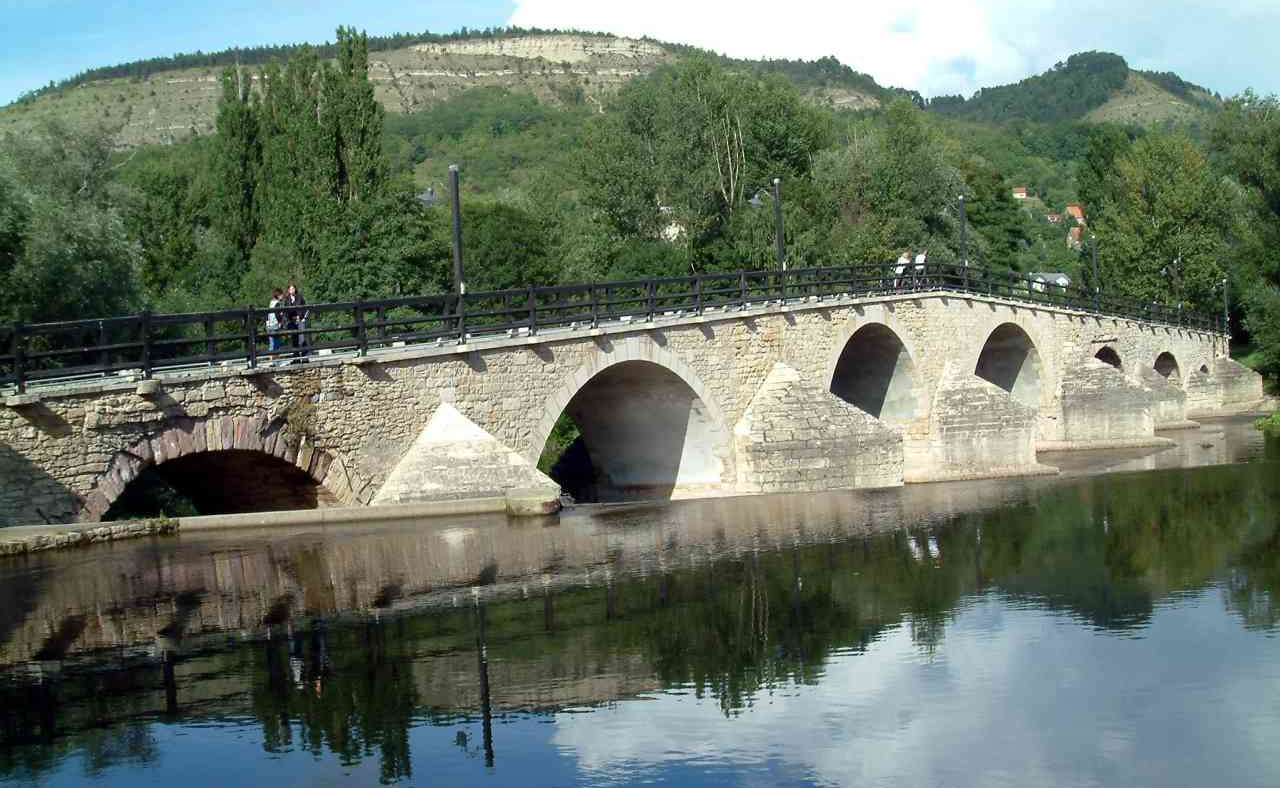
The medieval bridge across the Saale in Burgau district

Jena is situated in a hilly landscape in eastern Thuringia at the Saale river, between the Harz mountains 85 km (53 mi) in the north, the Thuringian Forest/Thuringian Highland 50 km (31 mi) in the southwest and the Ore Mountains, 75 km (47 mi) in the southeast. The municipal terrain is hilly with rugged slopes at the valley's edges. The city centre is situated at 160 m of elevation, whereas the mountains on both sides of Saale valley rise up to 400 m. On the eastern side those are (from north to south): the Gleisberg near Kunitz, the Jenzig near Wogau, the Hausberg near Wenigenjena, the Kernberge near Wöllnitz, the Johannisberg near Lobeda and the Einsiedlerberg near Drackendorf. On the western side, there are the Jägersberg near Zwätzen, the Windknollen north of the city centre, the Tatzend west of the city centre, the Lichtenhainer Höhe near Lichtenhain, the Holzberg near Winzerla, the Jagdberg near Göschwitz and the Spitzenberg near Maua. The mountains belong to the geological formation of Ilm Saale Plate (Muschelkalk) and are relatively flat on their peaks but steep to the valleys in between. Due to its jagged surface, the municipal territory isn't very suitable for agriculture all the more since the most flat areas along the valley were built on during the 20th century. At the mountains is some forest of different leaf trees and pines.

=== Ecology ===
32 species of native orchids can be found in the Jena area. One of the best places to see them is Leutratal, to the south of the town. Bee orchid (Ophrys apifera) even grows at a few locations within the town. On the Hausberg close to Ziegenhain a few specimens of the rare true service tree (Cormus domestica) can be found. Firefly can be seen in the meadows in Paradiespark as well as a variety of native wildflowers. Wildlife on the surrounding mountains includes raven, sand lizard and wood ants. Heron, beaver and muskrat have been seen on the Saale, within the town. Pine martens sometimes come into the town at night, from the mountains, to raid bins. It is documented that the European wildcat occurs near Jena.

=== Climate ===
Jena has an oceanic climate (Köppen: Cfb; Trewartha: Dobk). Summers are warm and sometimes humid; winters are relatively cold. The city's topography creates a microclimate caused through the basin position with sometimes inversion in winter (quite cold nights under −20 °C (−4 °F)) and heat and inadequate air circulation in summer. Annual precipitation is 585 millimeters (23.0 in) with moderate rainfall throughout the year. Light snowfall mainly occurs from December through February, but snow cover does not usually remain for long. During the Middle Ages, Jena was famous for growing wine on its slopes. Nowadays, the next commercial wine-growing areas are situated 20 km (12 mi) down Saale river. Due to its distance to coastal areas and position in the Saale valley, wind speeds tend to be very low; predominant direction is SW.

The Jena weather station has recorded the following extreme values:

- Its highest temperature was 39.2 °C (102.6 °F) on 27 June 2026.
- Its lowest temperature was −30.6 °C (−23.1 °F) on 22 January 1850 and 2 February 1830.
- Its greatest annual precipitation was 849.7 mm (33.45 in) in 1882.
- Its least annual precipitation was 379.4 mm (14.94 in) in 1911.
- The longest annual sunshine was 1928.8 hours in 2003.
- The shortest annual sunshine was 1108.6 hours in 1960.

Climate data for Jena, 1991–2020 normals, extremes 1821–present
Month	Jan	Feb	Mar	Apr	May	Jun	Jul	Aug	Sep	Oct	Nov	Dec	Year
Record high °C (°F)	17.0 (62.6)	23.1 (73.6)	25.9 (78.6)	32.5 (90.5)	36.1 (97.0)	39.2 (102.6)	39.1 (102.4)	38.7 (101.7)	36.5 (97.7)	29.0 (84.2)	23.1 (73.6)	17.7 (63.9)	39.2 (102.6)
Mean maximum °C (°F)	12.5 (54.5)	14.5 (58.1)	19.7 (67.5)	25.2 (77.4)	29.5 (85.1)	32.6 (90.7)	34.0 (93.2)	33.8 (92.8)	28.5 (83.3)	23.2 (73.8)	16.4 (61.5)	13.0 (55.4)	35.8 (96.4)
Mean daily maximum °C (°F)	4.6 (40.3)	6.2 (43.2)	10.6 (51.1)	16.2 (61.2)	20.4 (68.7)	23.7 (74.7)	26.0 (78.8)	25.7 (78.3)	20.7 (69.3)	15.0 (59.0)	8.9 (48.0)	5.3 (41.5)	15.3 (59.5)
Daily mean °C (°F)	1.7 (35.1)	2.5 (36.5)	5.7 (42.3)	10.1 (50.2)	14.3 (57.7)	17.7 (63.9)	19.7 (67.5)	19.1 (66.4)	14.6 (58.3)	10.1 (50.2)	5.6 (42.1)	2.6 (36.7)	10.3 (50.5)
Mean daily minimum °C (°F)	−1.2 (29.8)	−1.0 (30.2)	1.5 (34.7)	4.5 (40.1)	8.4 (47.1)	12.0 (53.6)	14.0 (57.2)	13.6 (56.5)	9.9 (49.8)	6.1 (43.0)	2.6 (36.7)	−0.1 (31.8)	5.9 (42.6)
Mean minimum °C (°F)	−10.9 (12.4)	−9.2 (15.4)	−5.0 (23.0)	−1.6 (29.1)	2.2 (36.0)	6.6 (43.9)	9.1 (48.4)	8.0 (46.4)	4.2 (39.6)	−0.8 (30.6)	−3.9 (25.0)	−8.7 (16.3)	−13.3 (8.1)
Record low °C (°F)	−30.6 (−23.1)	−30.6 (−23.1)	−24.0 (−11.2)	−12.4 (9.7)	−5.1 (22.8)	0.6 (33.1)	3.7 (38.7)	3.4 (38.1)	−4.4 (24.1)	−10.9 (12.4)	−24.6 (−12.3)	−28.8 (−19.8)	−30.6 (−23.1)
Average precipitation mm (inches)	35.3 (1.39)	30.4 (1.20)	41.9 (1.65)	36.9 (1.45)	61.2 (2.41)	54.8 (2.16)	85.1 (3.35)	67.6 (2.66)	50.8 (2.00)	41.6 (1.64)	47.3 (1.86)	42.8 (1.69)	595.6 (23.45)
Average extreme snow depth cm (inches)	7.2 (2.8)	5.4 (2.1)	3.3 (1.3)	0.3 (0.1)	0 (0)	0 (0)	0 (0)	0 (0)	0 (0)	0.2 (0.1)	1.3 (0.5)	5.6 (2.2)	10.6 (4.2)
Average precipitation days (≥ 0.1 mm)	16.9	14.7	15.9	12.5	14.1	13.9	14.7	13.6	12.2	14.1	15.5	17.4	175.5
Average relative humidity (%)	78.7	75.2	71.0	66.0	67.1	67.2	66.4	68.4	74.9	79.3	81.7	80.6	73.0
Mean monthly sunshine hours	59.1	80.7	107.7	160.4	191.4	182.6	197.4	213.2	136.3	104.9	53.6	44.8	1,532.1
Source: Deutscher Wetterdienst / SKlima.de

=== Administrative division ===
Jena abuts the district of Saale-Holzland with the municipalities of Lehesten, Neuengönna, and Golmsdorf in the north, Jenalöbnitz, Großlöbichau, and Schlöben in the east and Laasdorf, Zöllnitz, Sulza, Rothenstein, Milda, and Bucha in the south and the district of Weimarer Land with the municipalities of Döbritschen, Großschwabhausen, and Saaleplatte in the west.

The city is divided into 30 districts. The inner-city districts are Zentrum, Nord, West, Süd, Wenigenjena (east of Saale, incorporated in 1909), and Kernberge, other big districts are Lobeda (incorporated in 1946) and Winzerla (incorporated in 1922) in the south with large housing complexes.

Outlying districts are more rural in character:

- Ammerbach (incorporated 1922)
- Burgau (1922)
- Closewitz (1994)
- Cospeda (1994)
- Drackendorf (1994)
- Göschwitz (1969)
- Ilmnitz (1994)
- Isserstedt (1994)
- Jenaprießnitz/Wogau (1994)
- Krippendorf (1994)
- Kunitz/Laasan (1994)
- Leutra (1994)
- Lichtenhain (1913)
- Löbstedt (1922)
- Lützeroda (1994)
- Maua (1994)
- Münchenroda/Remderoda (1994)
- Vierzehnheiligen (1994)
- Wöllnitz (1946)
- Ziegenhain (1913)
- Zwätzen (1922)

=== Demographics ===
Population development until 2017

Ten largest groups of foreign residents
Nationality	Population (31 December 2017)
Poland	800
Russia	585
India	540
Ukraine	500

Over the centuries, Jena had mostly been a town of 4,000 to 5,000 inhabitants. The population growth began in the 19th century with an amount of 6,000 in 1840 and of 8,000 in 1870. Then, a demographic boom occurred with a population of 20,000 in 1900, 50,000 in 1920, 73,000 in 1940, 81,000 in 1960 and 104,000 in 1980. The peak was reached in 1988 with a population of 108,000. The bad economic situation in eastern Germany after the reunification resulted in a decline in population, which fell to 99,000 in 1998 before rising again to 107,000 in 2012.

The average population growth between 2009 and 2012 was approximately 0.47% p. a, whereas the population in bordering rural regions is shrinking with accelerating tendency. Suburbanization played only a small role in Jena. It occurred after the reunification for a short time in the 1990s, but most of the suburban areas were situated within the administrative city borders.

The birth surplus was 62 in 2012, or +0.6 per 1,000 inhabitants (Thuringian average: -4.5; national average: -2.4). The net migration rate was +4.0 per 1,000 inhabitants in 2012 (Thuringian average: -0.8; national average: +4.6). The most important regions of origin of Jena migrants are rural areas of Thuringia, Saxony-Anhalt and Saxony as well as foreign countries such as Poland, Russia, Ukraine, Hungary, Serbia, Romania, and Bulgaria.

Like many other eastern German cities, Jena has a small foreign-born population: circa 4.0% are non-Germans by citizenship and overall 6.2% are migrants (according to 2011 EU census). Differing from the national average, the biggest groups of migrants in Jena are Russians, Chinese and Ukrainians. During recent years, the economic situation of the city has improved: the unemployment rate declined from 14% in 2005 to 7% in 2013. Due to the official policy of atheism in the former GDR, most of the population is non-religious. 15.9% are members of the Evangelical Church in Central Germany and 6.6% are Catholics (according to 2011 EU census).

== Culture, sights and cityscape ==
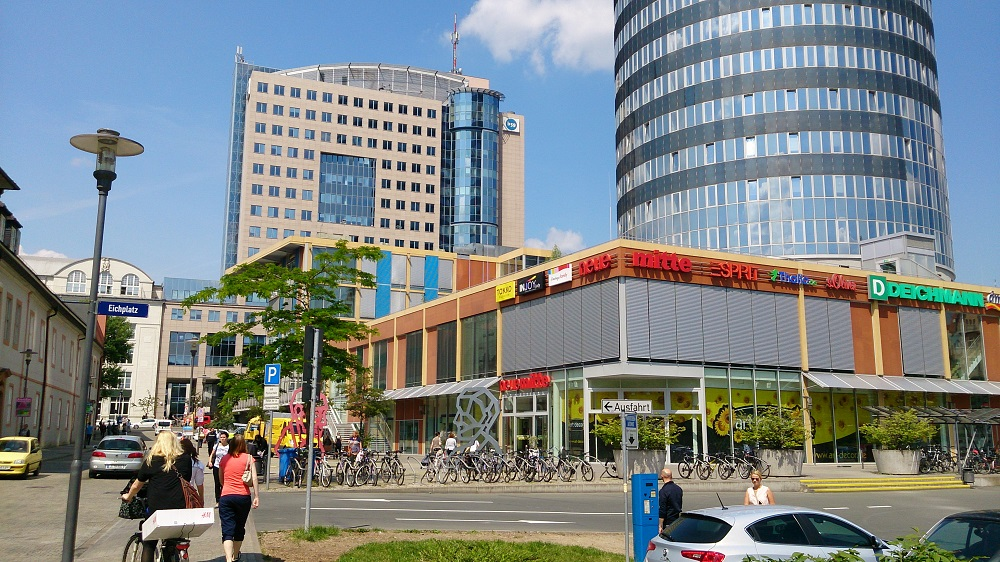
The "Neue Mitte" shopping mall beneath the Jen Tower and the "b59" skyscraper in the background

=== Museums ===
Jena has a great variety of museums:

- The Optical Museum Jena at Carl-Zeiß-Platz shows the history of optical instruments such as glasses, microscopes, cameras, and telescopes.
- The Phyletisches Museum at Neutor hosts a natural history exhibition with focus on evolution and fossils.
- The Stadtmuseum & Kunstsammlung at Markt square shows the city history of Jena and hosts furthermore an exhibition of modern and contemporary art.
- The Botanischer Garten (botanic garden) at Fürstengraben is one of the oldest botanic gardens in Germany (established in 1794) and hosts 12,000 plants from all over the world.
- The Romantikerhaus at Unterm Markt street hosts an exhibition about the epoque of Jena romantics in German literature.
- Schillers Gartenhaus at Schillergässchen is the former summer house of Friedrich Schiller and shows an exhibition of his life and his connection to Jena.
- The Goethe-Gedenkstätte at Fürstengraben shows an exhibition about the links between Johann Wolfgang von Goethe and Jena (only in summer).
- The Ernst-Haeckel-Haus at Berggasse is the former house of biologist Ernst Haeckel and hosts an exhibition about his life.
- The Schott Glasmuseum at Otto-Schott-Straße shows the life of Otto Schott and the history of his glass factory, the Schott AG.
- The Museum 1806 at Cospeda district hosts an exhibition about the Battle of Jena–Auerstedt during the Napoleonic wars.
- The University of Jena hosts some important scientific collections, like the collection of pre- and protohistoric artifacts. While the collections of antiques and minerals are public, the oriental coins are only accessed for research.

==== Image gallery ====
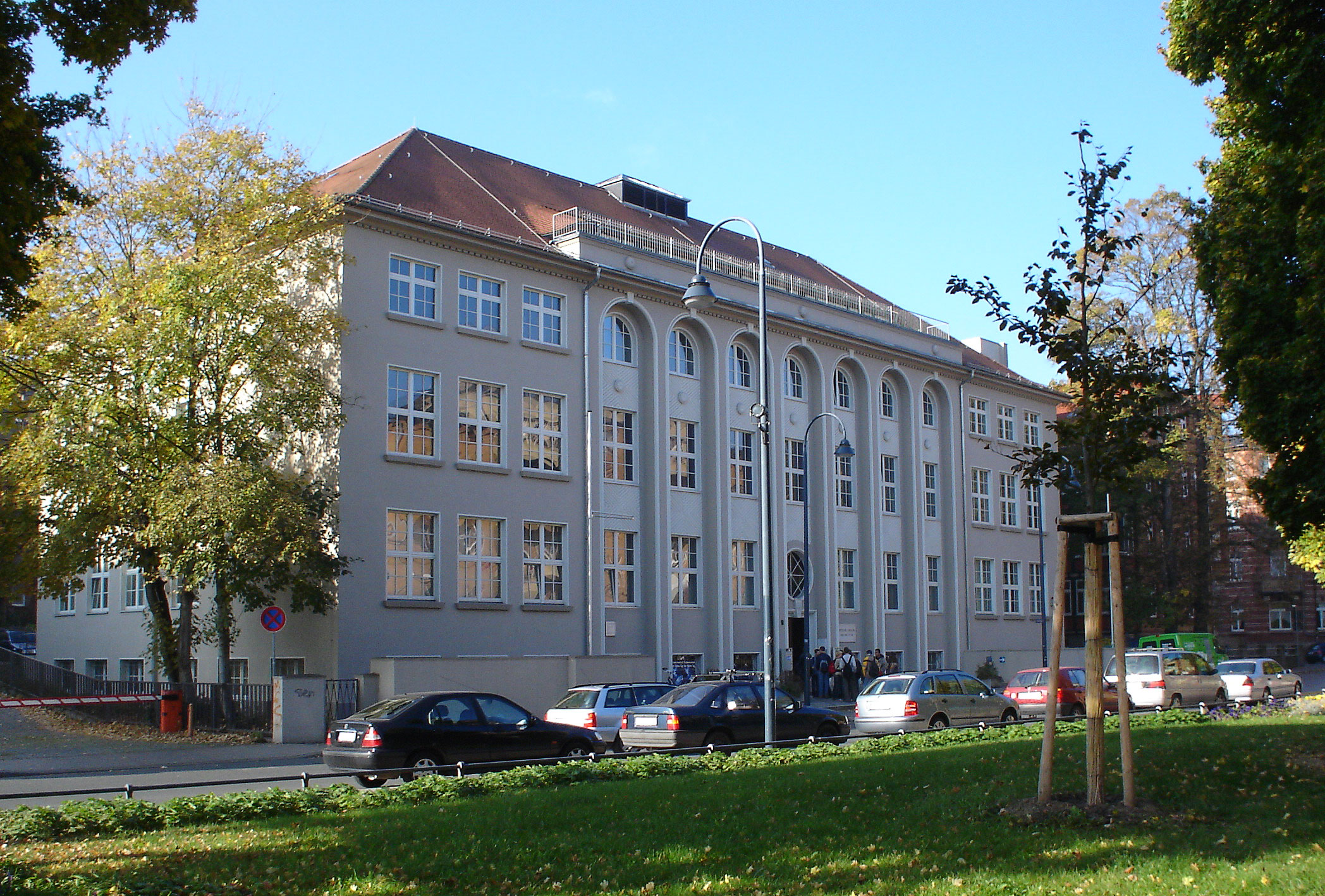
Optisches Museum

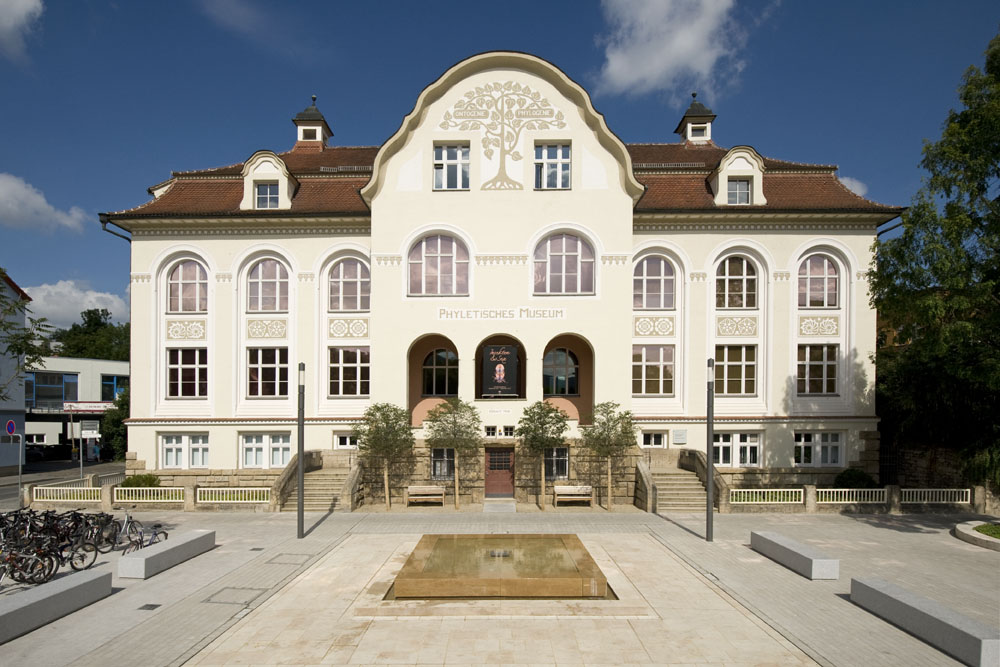
Phyletisches Museum

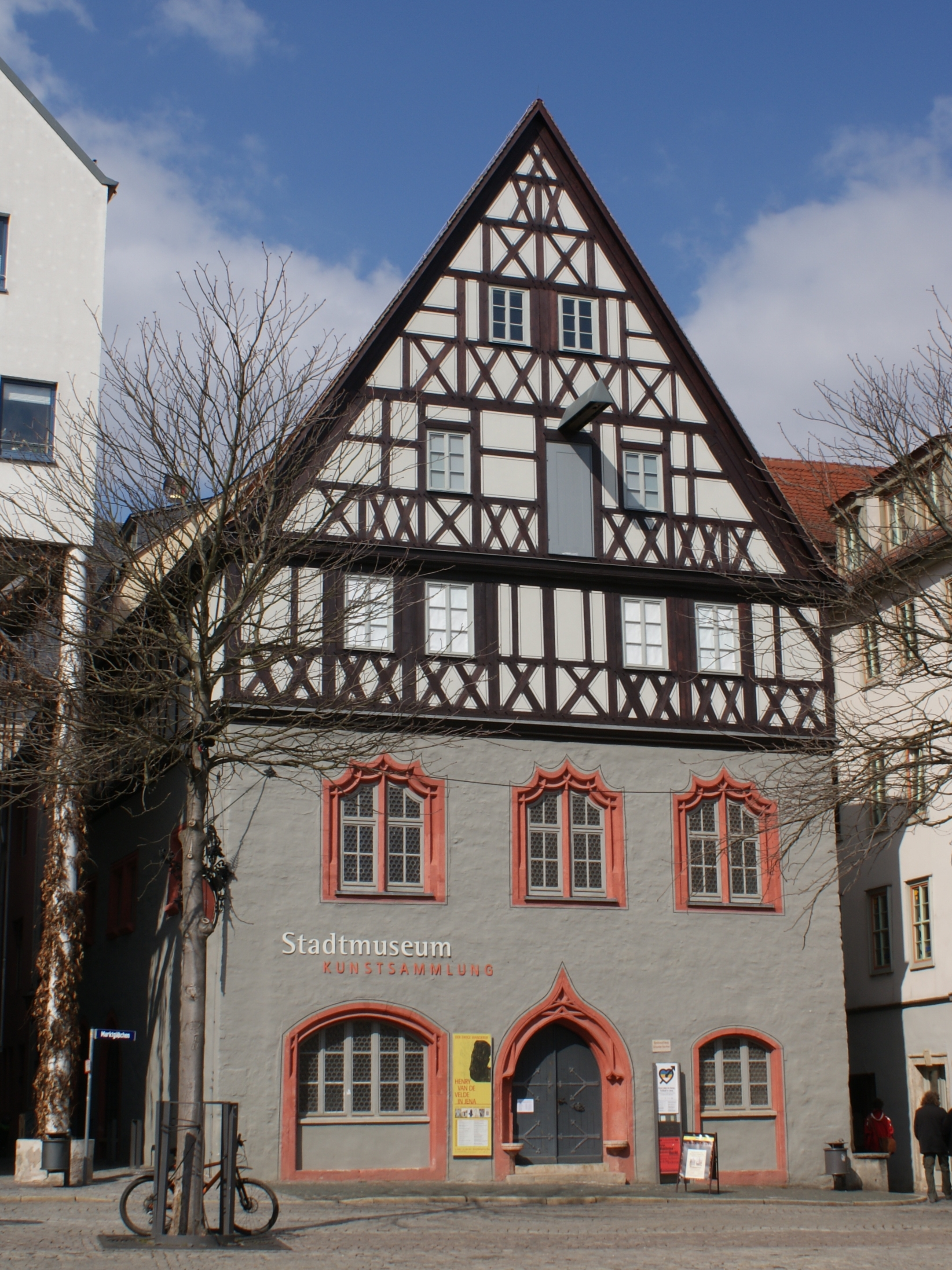
Stadtmuseum

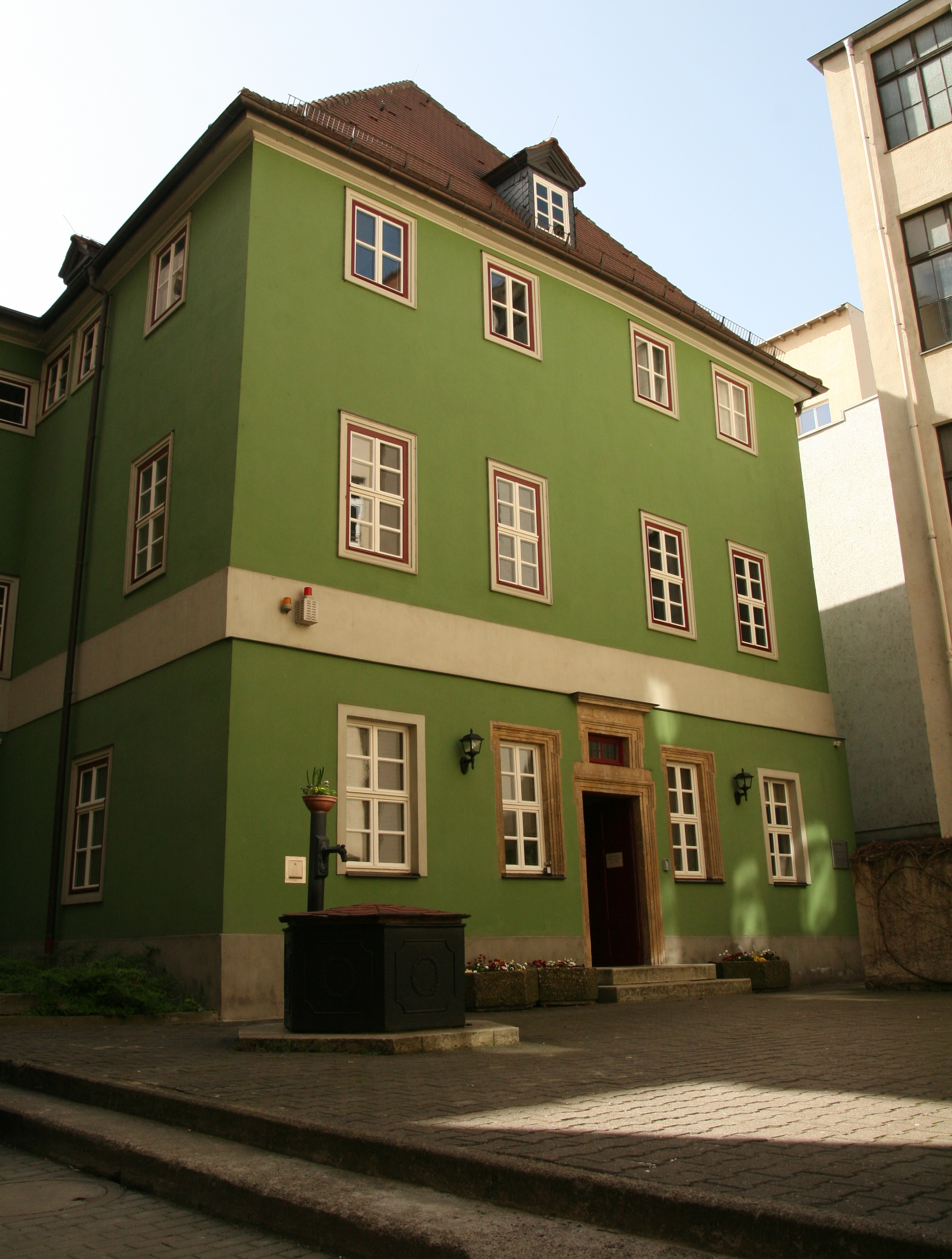
Romantikerhaus

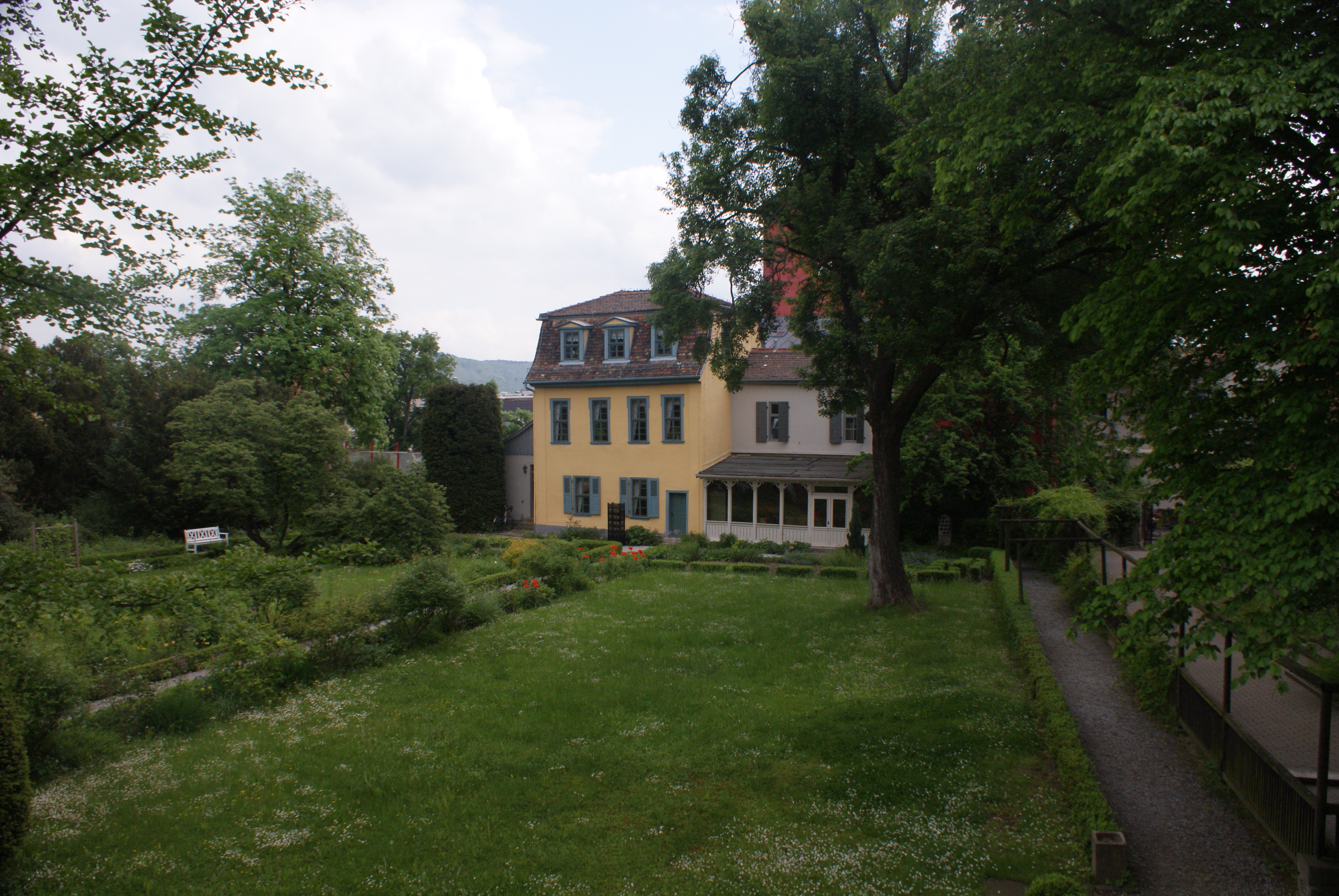
Schillers Gartenhaus

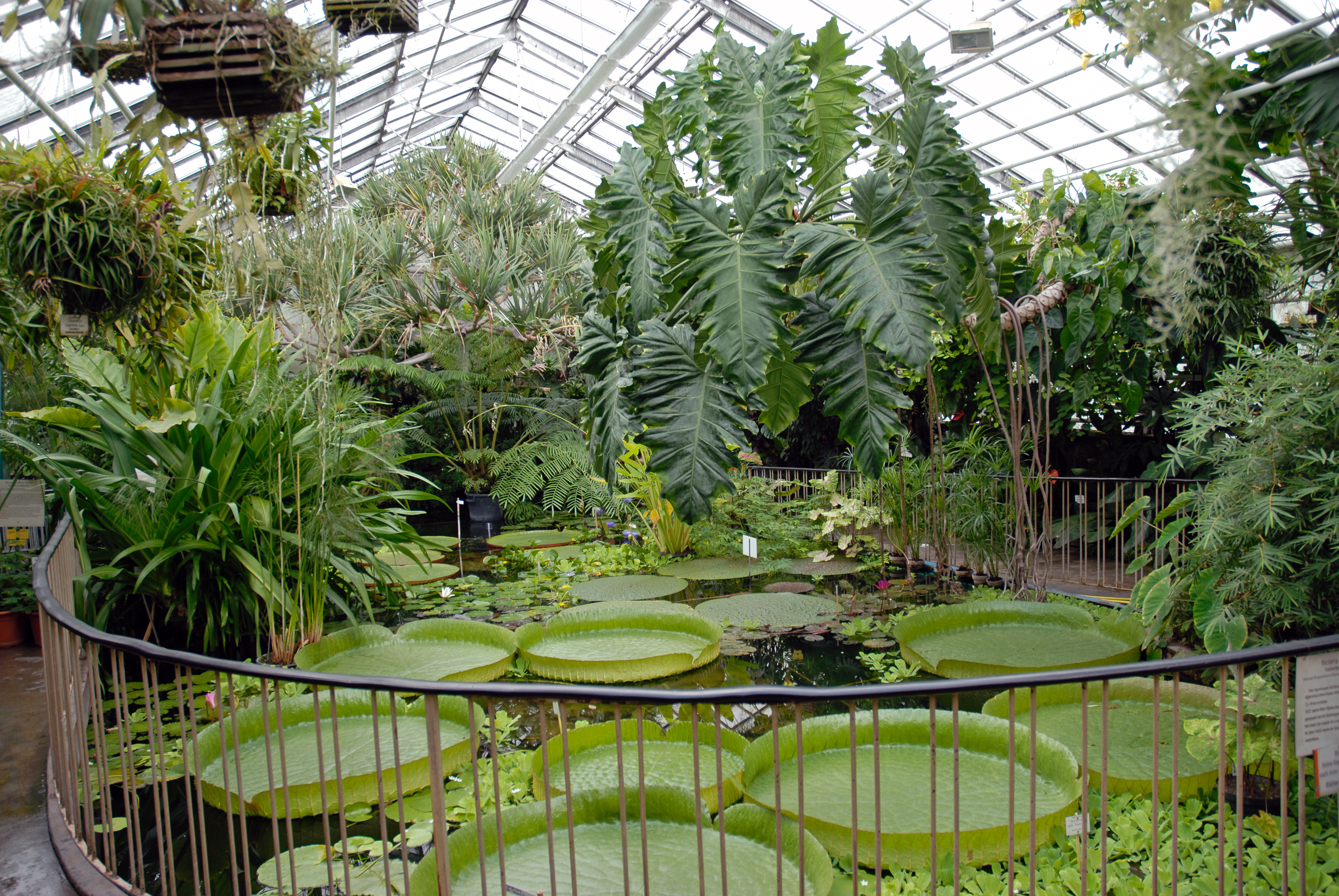
Botanischer Garten

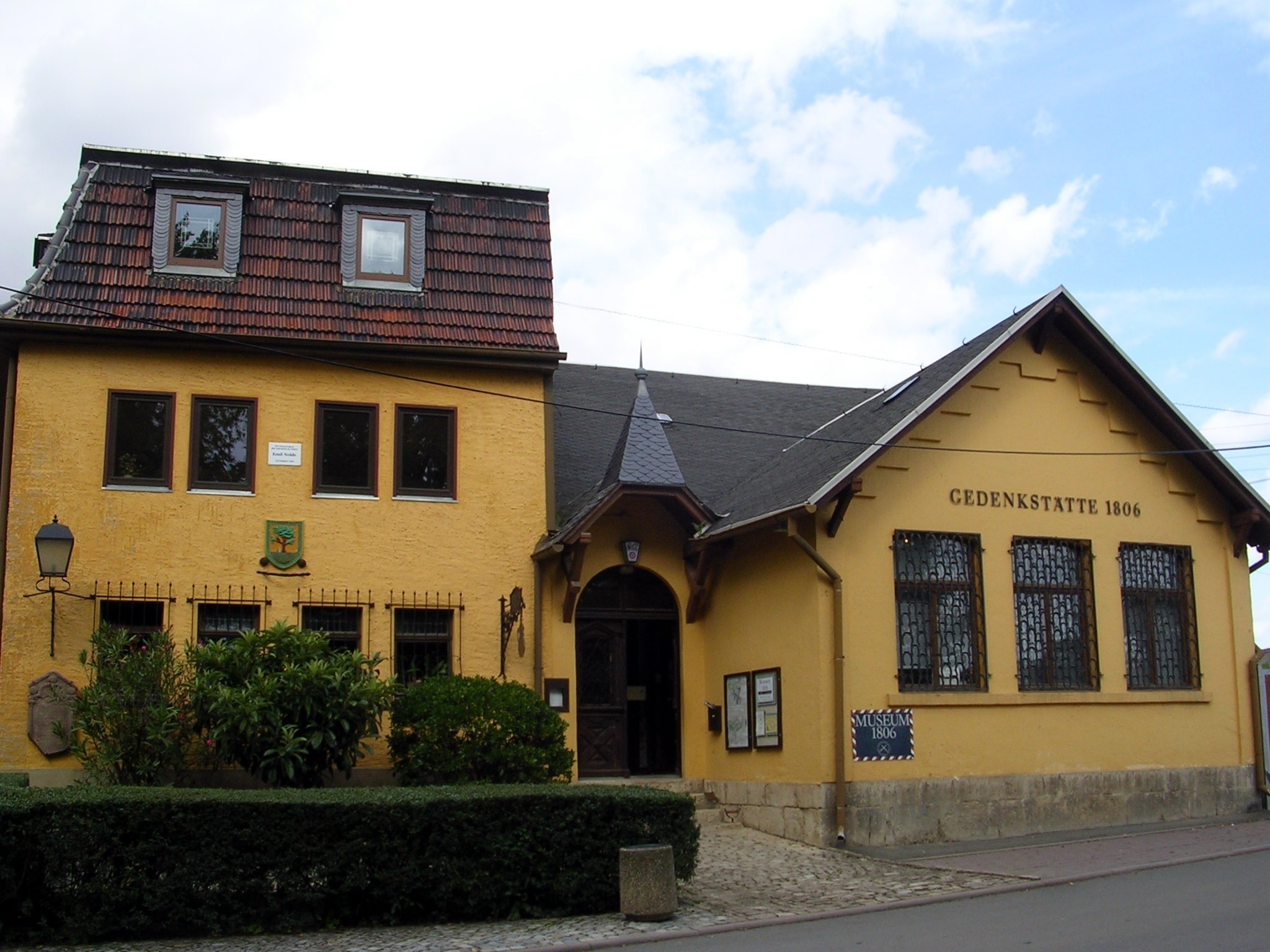
Museum 1806 in Cospeda

=== Cityscape ===
Most of the city consists of buildings from before World War II. The historic city centre is located inside the former wall (which is the area between Fürstengraben in the north, Löbdergraben in the east, Teichgraben in the south and Leutragraben in the west). There are only a few historic buildings in this area (e.g. at Oberlauengasse), due to the destruction during World War II and modernization projects in the following decades. The Eichplatz, a big sub-used square covering a large amount of the centre, has not been built on since the 1960s and the discussion about its future is still in process. The wall's defortification took place relatively early in the 18th century – and the first suburbs developed in front of the former city gates. In these areas, some historic building structures from the 18th and early 19th century remained in western Bachstraße and Wagnergasse, in northern Zwätzengasse and in southern Neugasse.

The later 19th and early 20th centuries brought a construction boom to Jena, with the city enlarged to the north and south along the Saale valley, to the west along Mühltal and on the Saale's east side in former Wenigenjena. Compared with the city centre, later substantial losses were much slighter in this areas. During the interwar period, the construction of flats stayed on a high level but suitable ground got less, so that new housing complexes were set up relatively far away from the centre – a problem that remained until today with long journeys and high rents as consequences. Today's Jena is not as compact as other cities in the region, and urban planning is still a challenge.

A peculiarity of Jena is the presence of a second old town centre with a market square, town hall, and castle in the former town of Lobeda, which is a district since 1946, located approximately 4 km (2 mi) to the south of Jena's centre.

=== Sights and architectural heritage ===
==== Churches ====
- The main church, St. Michael's, is one of the biggest Gothic monuments in Thuringia and was built between 1422 and 1557. It has a bronze slab of Martin Luther's tomb.
- The St. John's Church was the church of the extinct village Leutra west of Jena and later used as the city's cemetery chapel. Since 1811, the Gothic building is the catholic church of Jena.
- The Peace Church was built between 1686 and 1693 as new cemetery chapel and is a Baroque evangelical church today.
- The Schiller Church east of Saale river is the evangelical parish church of the former village and today's quarter Wenigenjena. Friedrich Schiller married here in 1790.
- The St. Peter's Church is the former city church of Jena's southern district Lobeda. The Gothic church was built around 1480.
- The parish church of Vierzehnheiligen (dedicated to the Fourteen Holy Helpers) is a Gothic-style former pilgrimage church established during the 1460s.
- The St. Mary's Church in Ziegenhain is a former pilgrimage church in Gothic style, built in the 15th century.
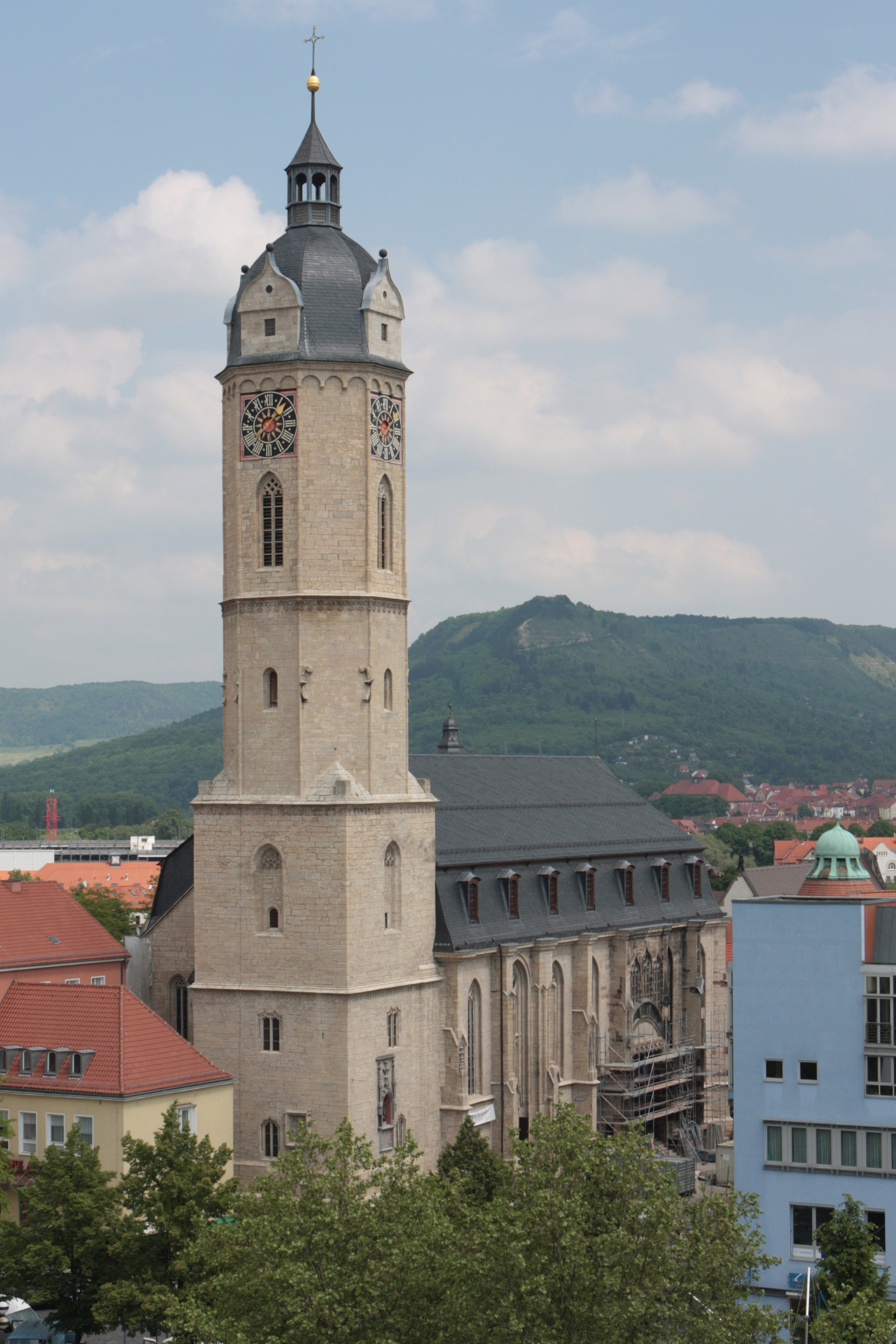
Main church St. Michael

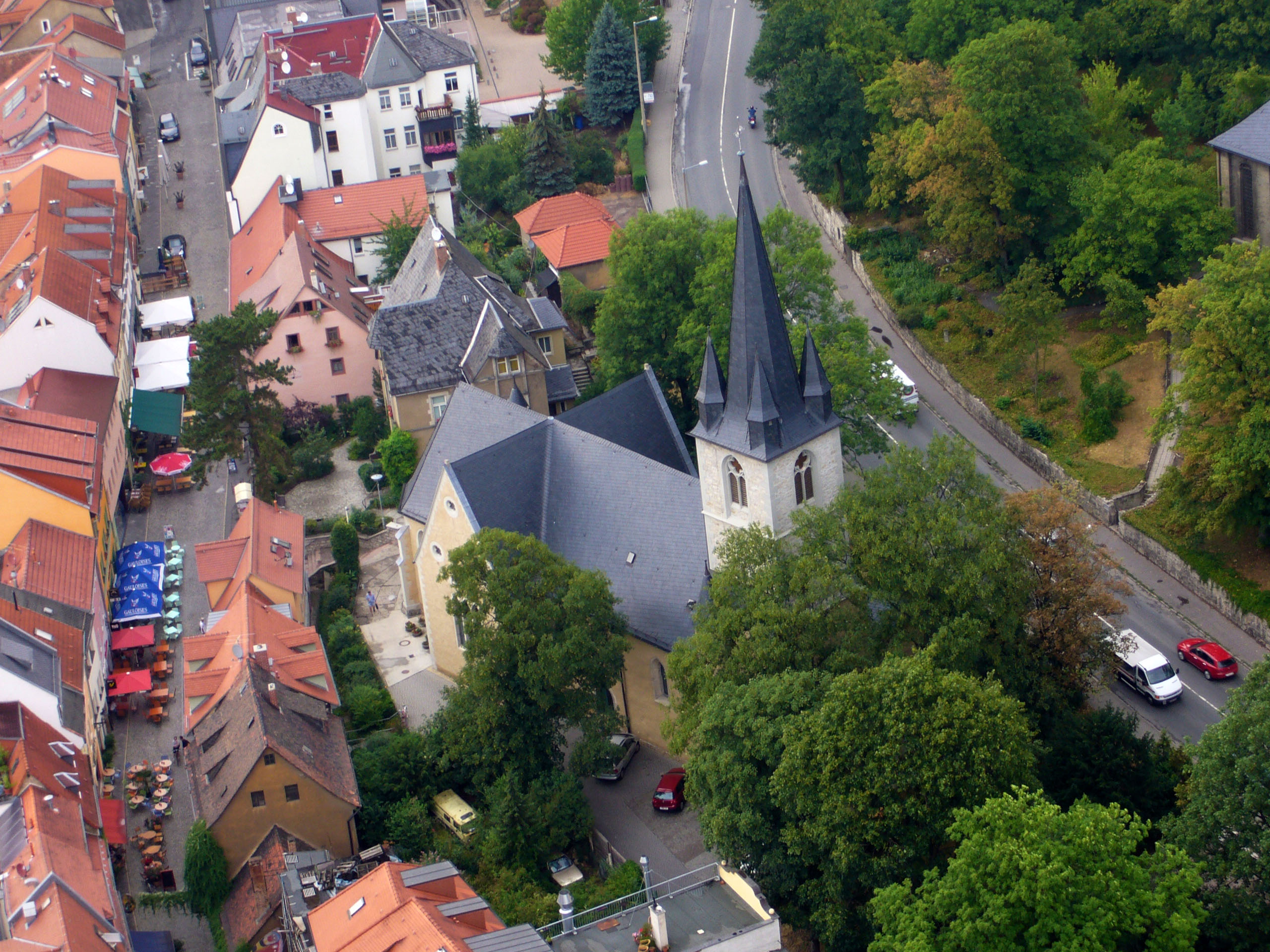
St. John's Church

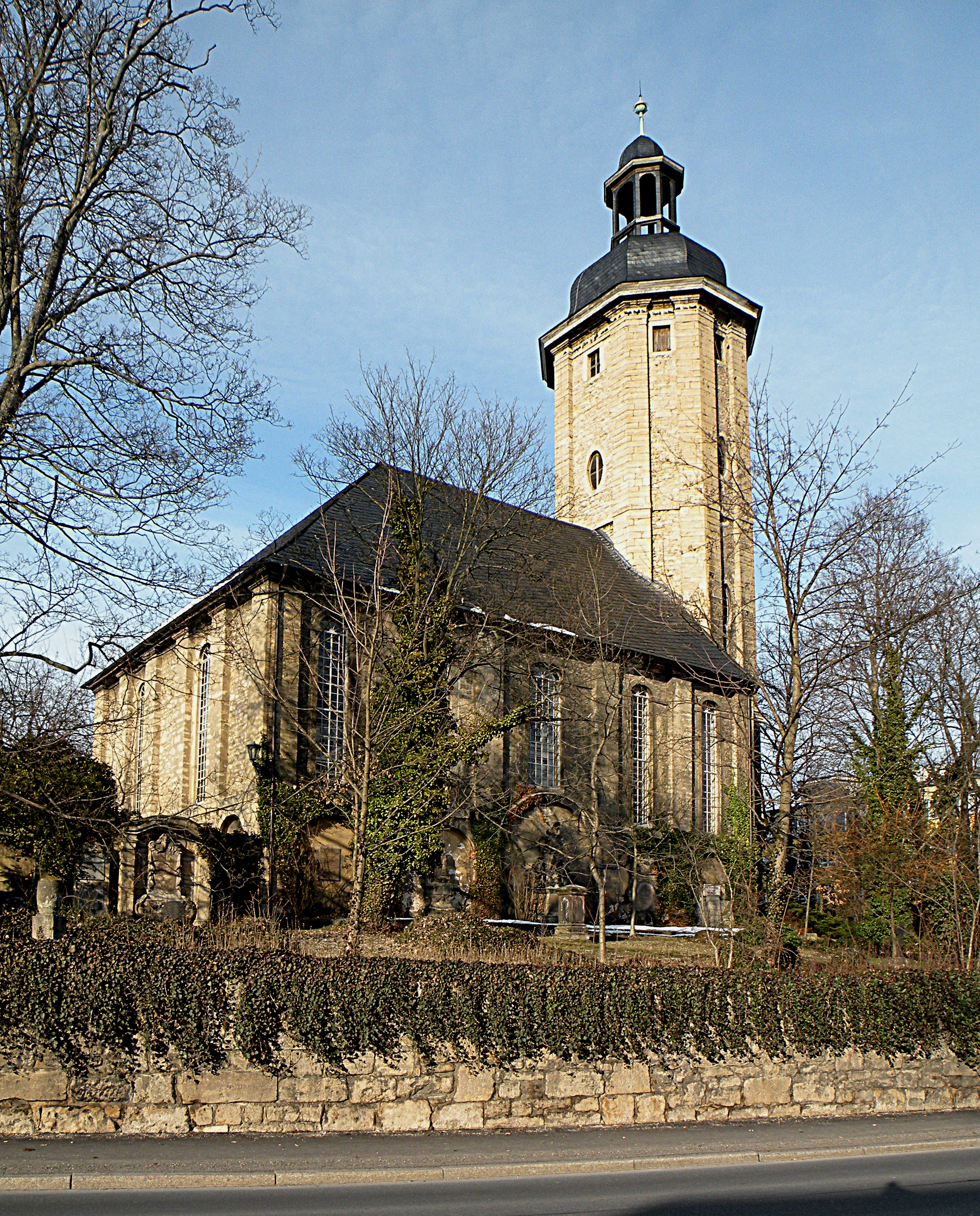
Peace Church

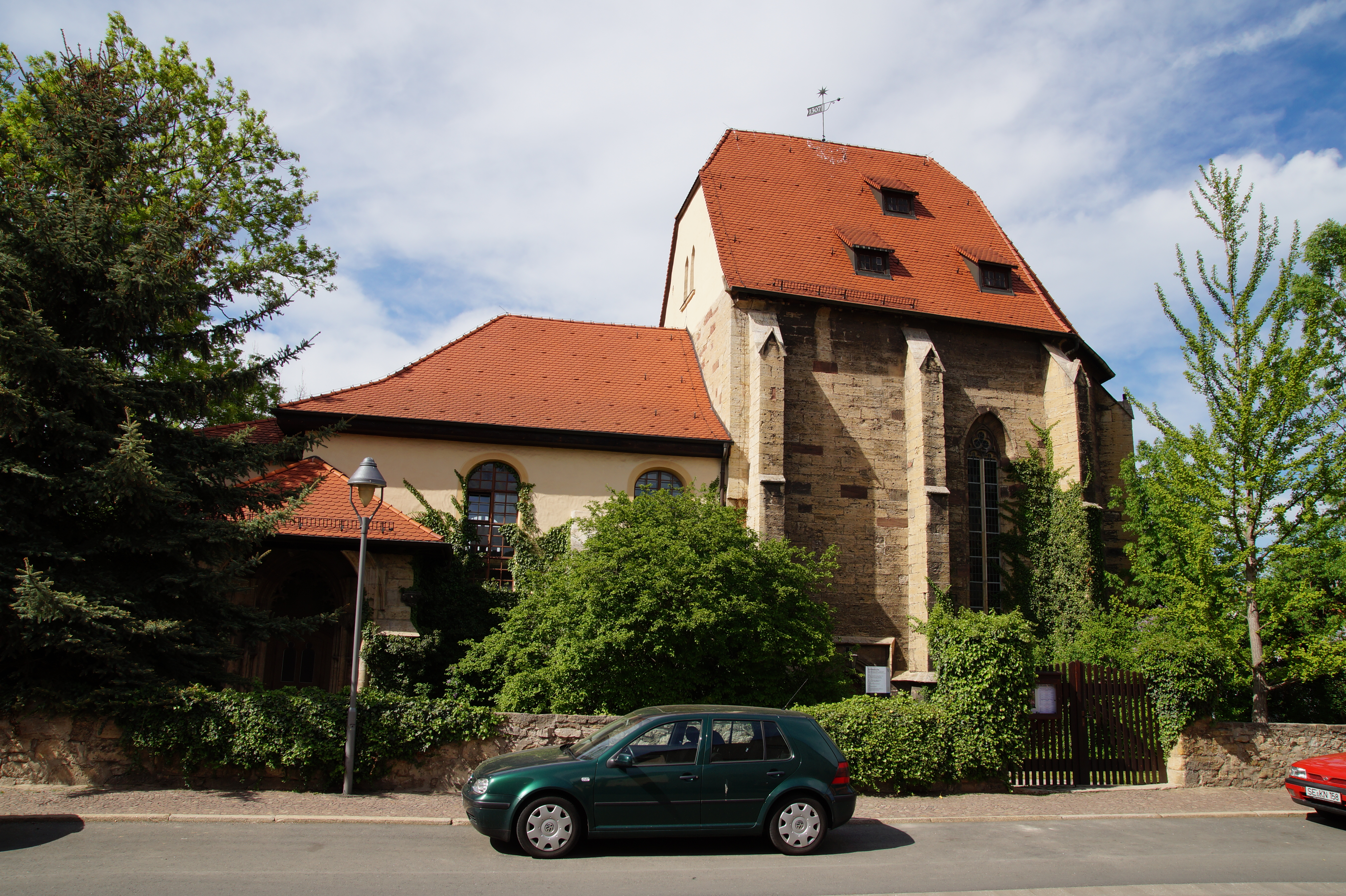
Schiller Church

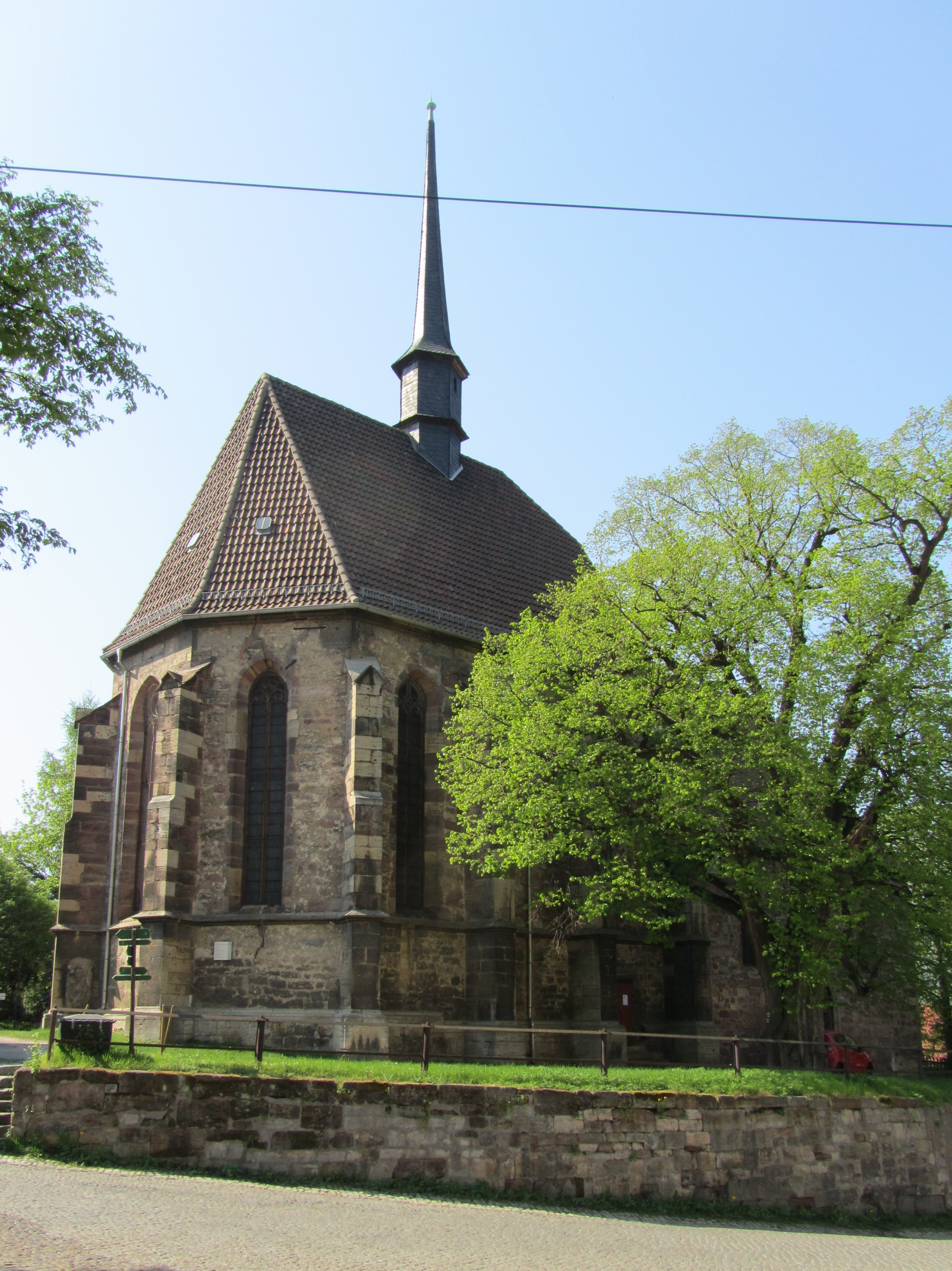
Church of Lobeda

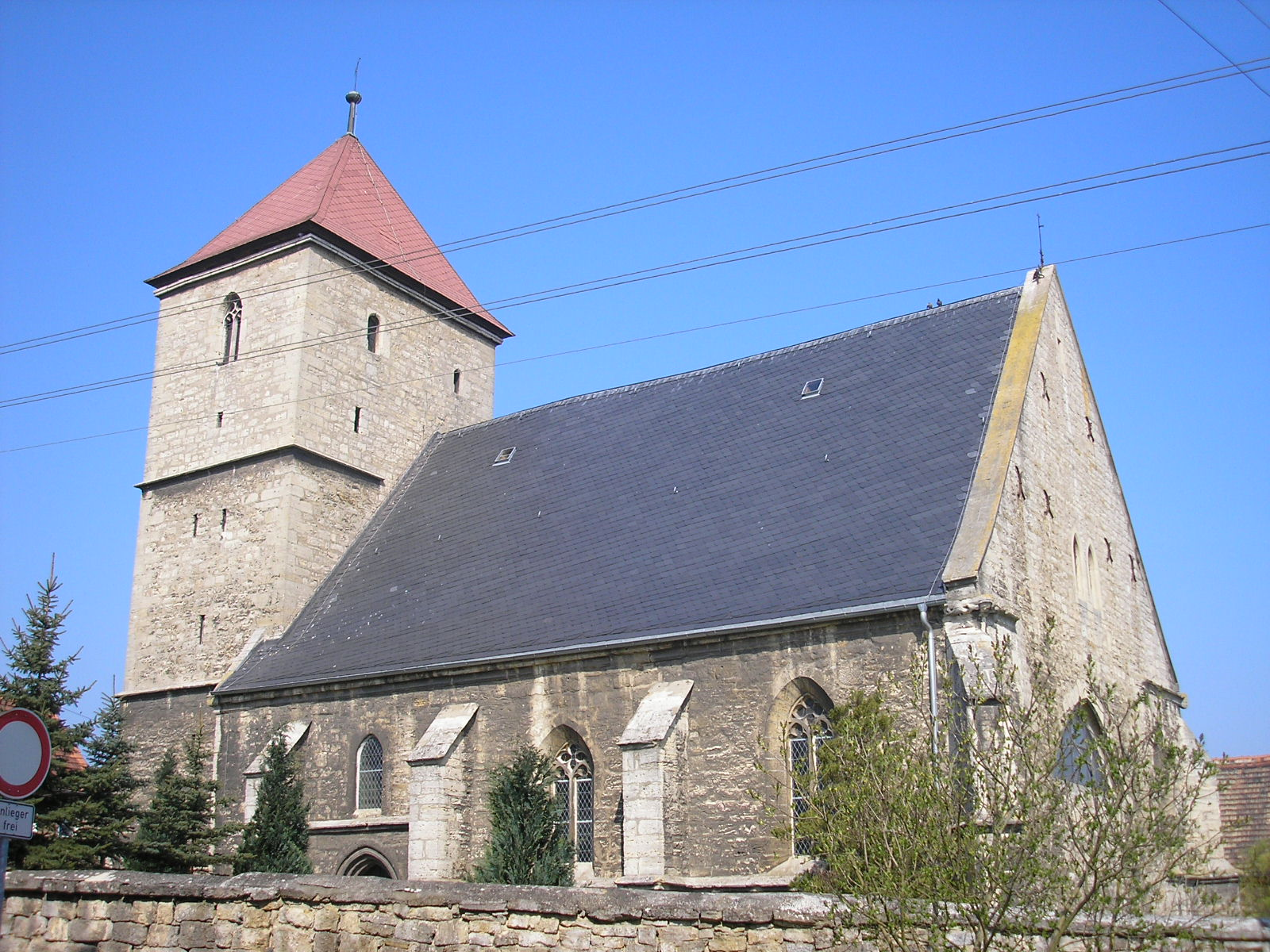
Church of Vierzehnheiligen

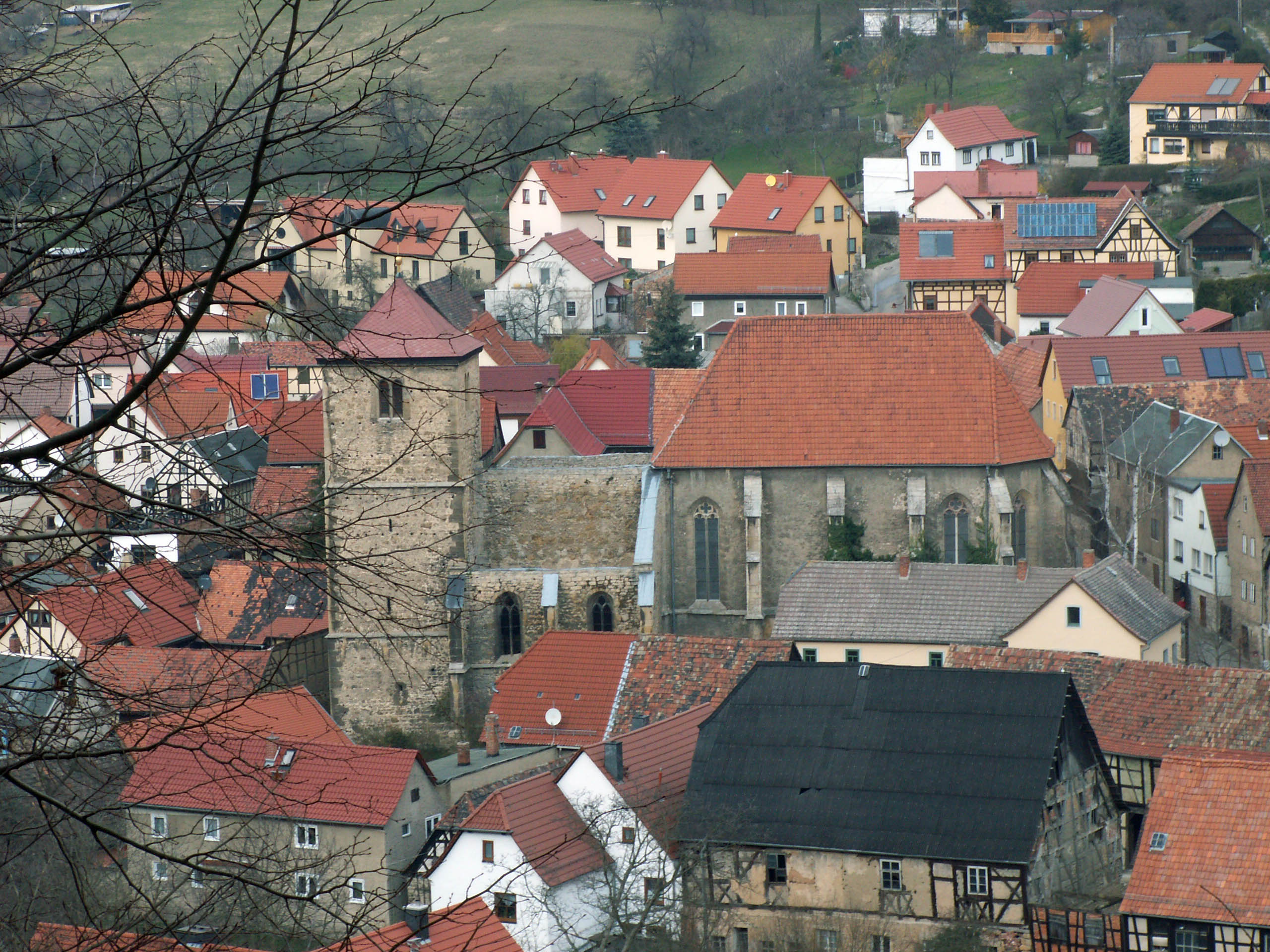
Church of Ziegenhain

==== Other sights ====
- The medieval city wall is preserved in parts (Anatomieturm and Roter Turm), the largest one is the complex around Johannistor and Pulverturm near Johannisplatz.
- The town hall at Markt square was built around 1412 and is one of only few Gothic town halls in Germany. It has an astronomical clock featuring the "Snatching Hans" ("Schnapphans").
- The planetarium opened in 1926 and was the first large planetarium in the world, with technology developed by Carl Zeiss.
- The University Main Building stands at the former castle's place and was established in 1908 in early-modern style (Theodor Fischer/Bruno Taut).
- The Abbeanum is a university building by Ernst Neufert in Bauhaus style, built in 1930.
- The Jen Tower is the city's highest skyscraper, built between 1969 and 1972, with a viewing platform and a sky restaurant.
- The Haus Auerbach is the former house of physicist Felix Auerbach, built by Walter Gropius and Adolf Meyer in Bauhaus style in 1924. Near is the Haus Zuckerkandl, another mansion built by Gropius in 1929.
- The former Carl Zeiss Factory in the city centre hosts interesting technical architecture from the period between 1880 and 1965, including Germany's first high-rise building, the Bau 15 from 1915.
- The monument to John Frederick the Magnanimous (built in 1858) at the Markt square is a landmark of Jena called "Hanfried".
- The monument to Ernst Abbe is a building of early-modern architecture by Henry van de Velde (1910).
- The Lobdeburg is a castle ruin above Lobeda district and the former seat of the lords of Lobdeburg, founders of Jena.
- Naturschutzgebiet Leutratal und Cospoth is an important nature reserve to the southwest.
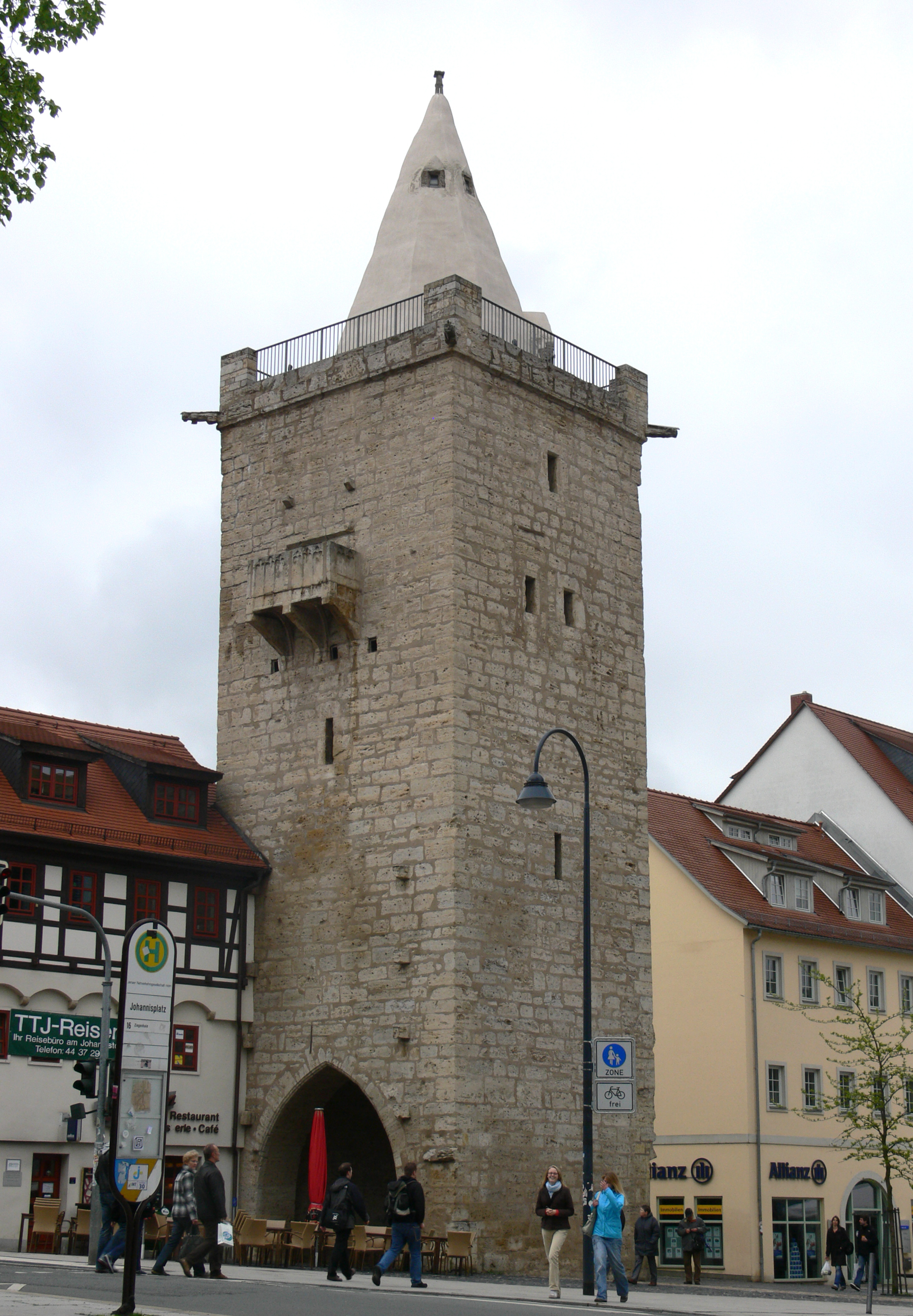
Johannistor, medieval city gate

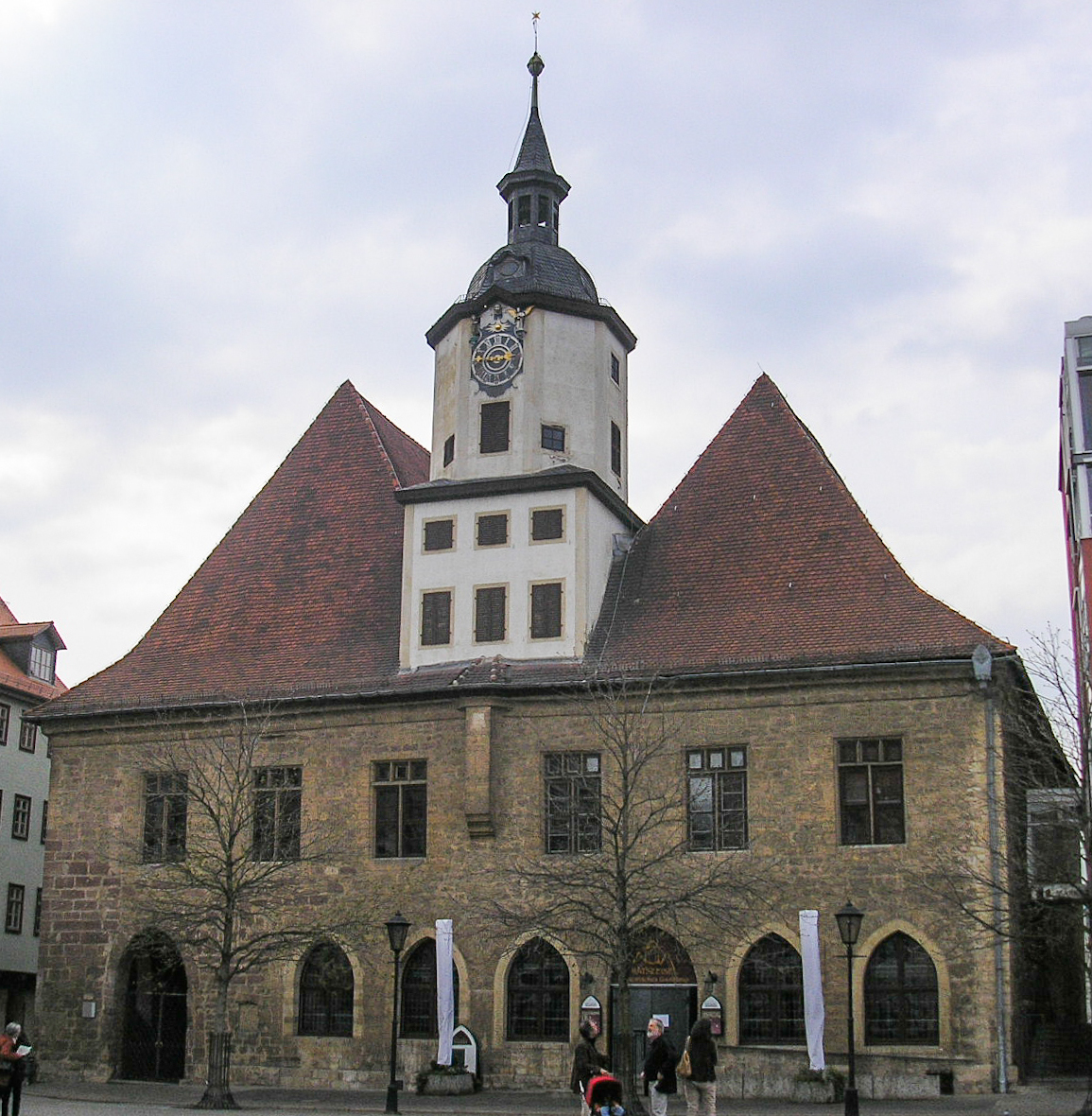
Town hall

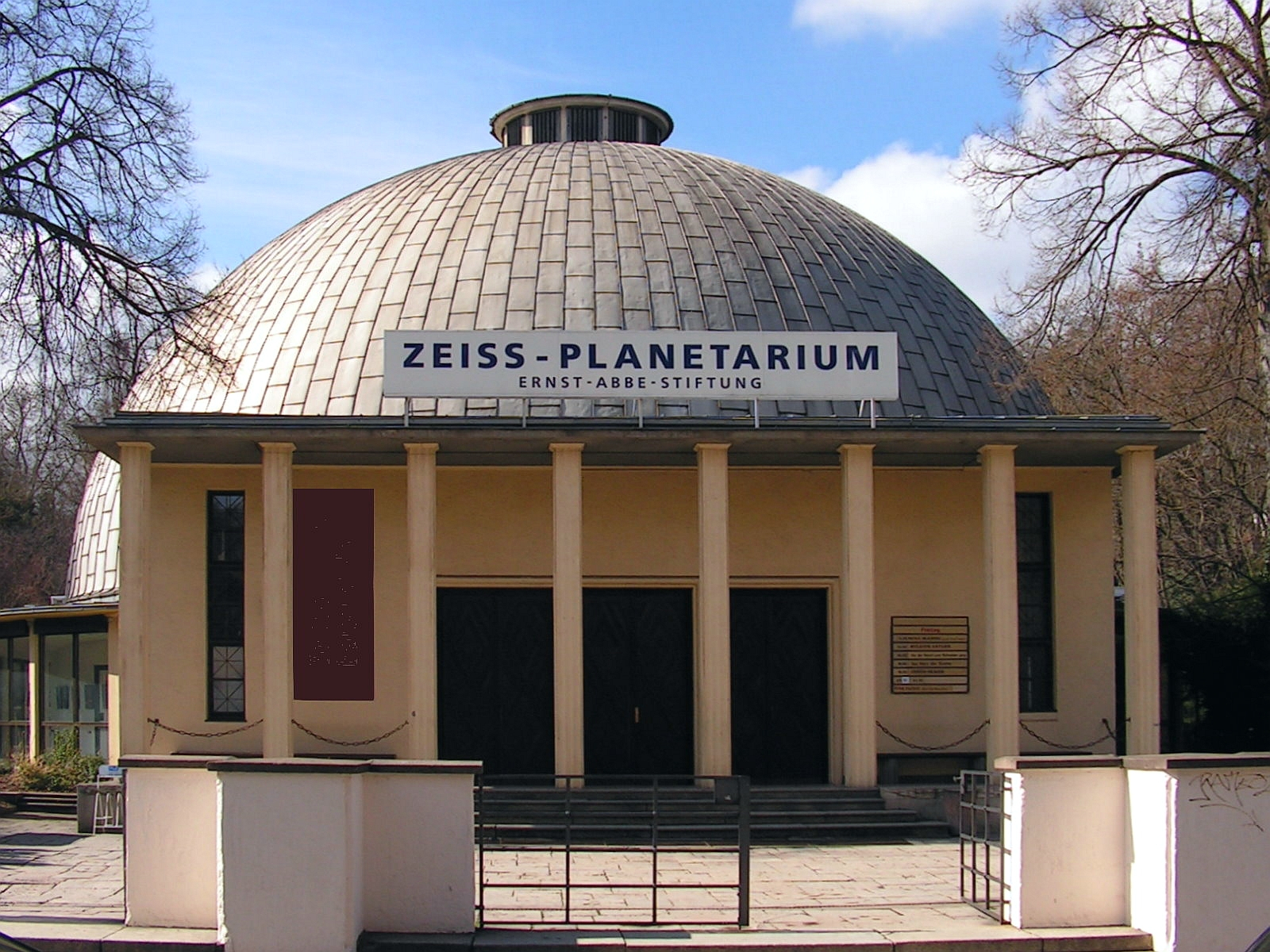
Planetarium

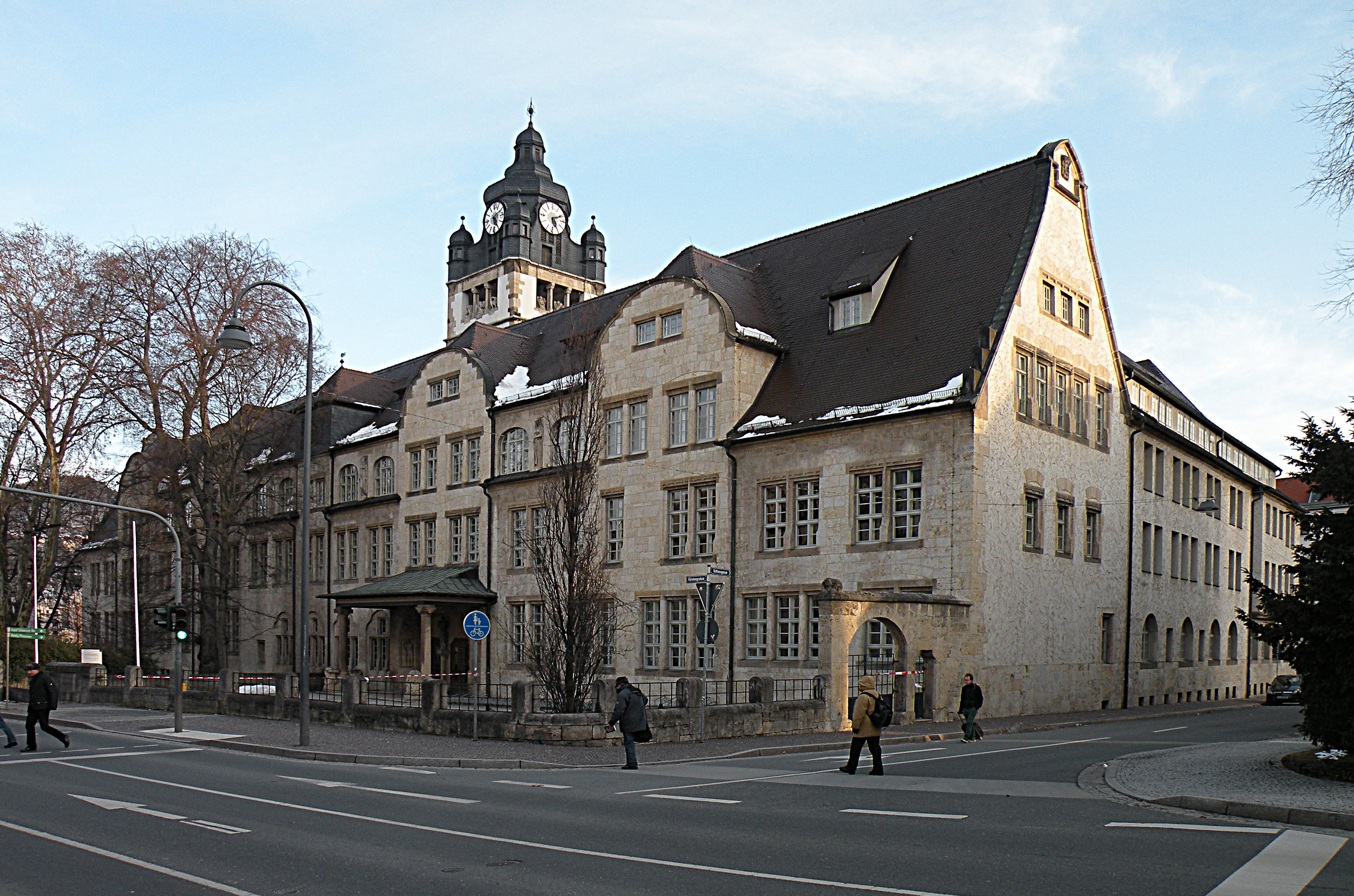
University Main Building

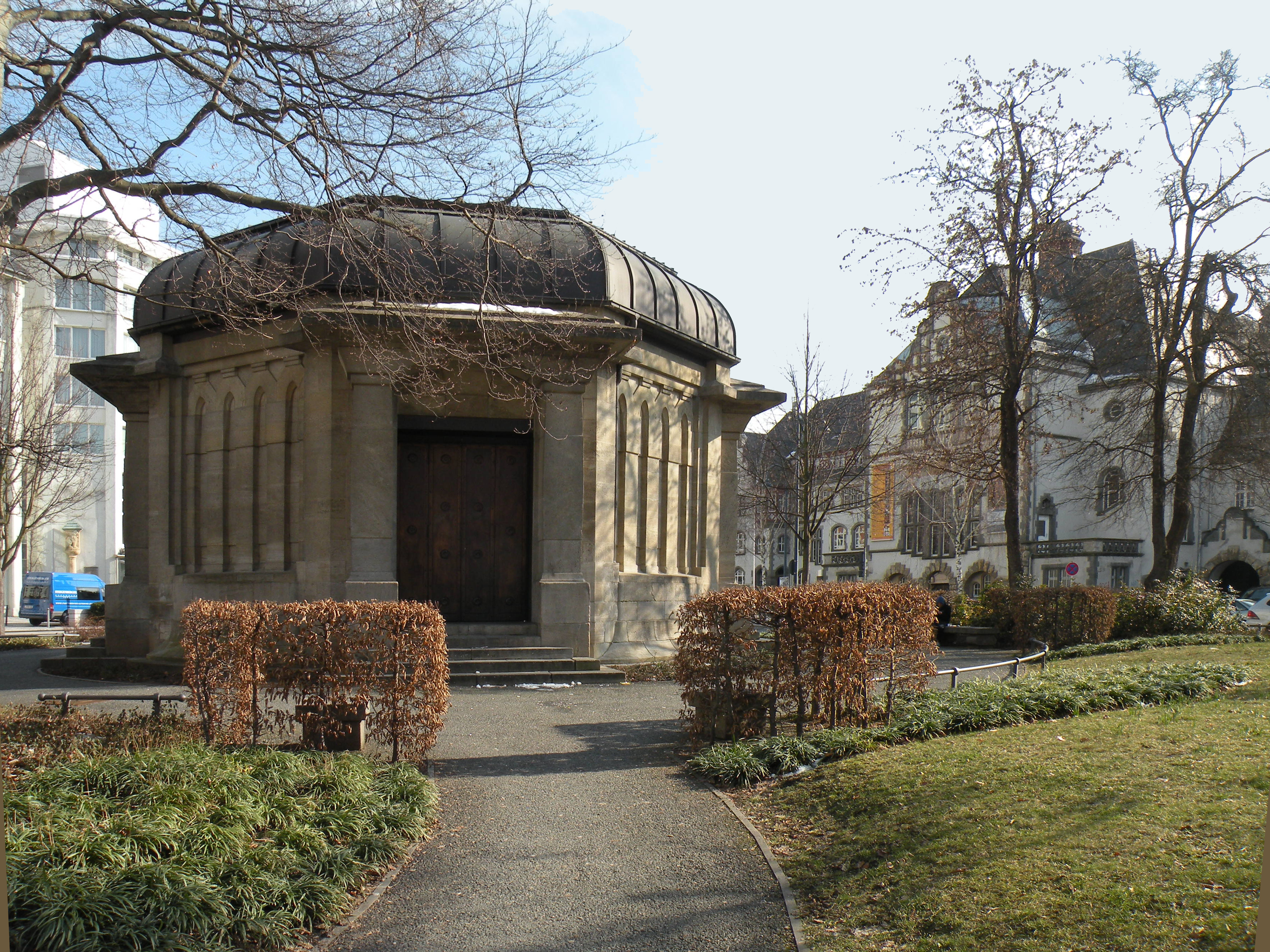
Ernst Abbe Monument

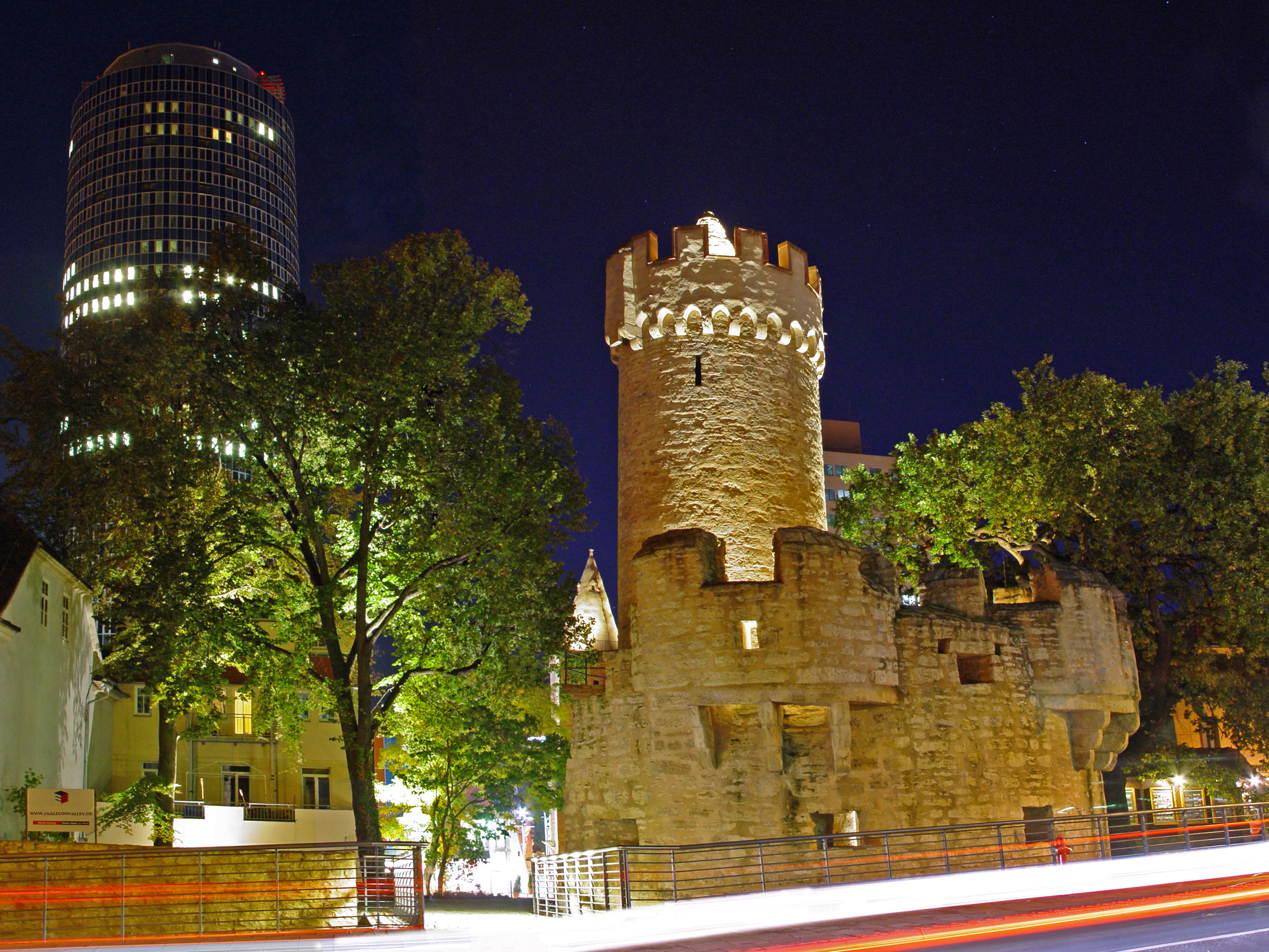
Pulverturm at night

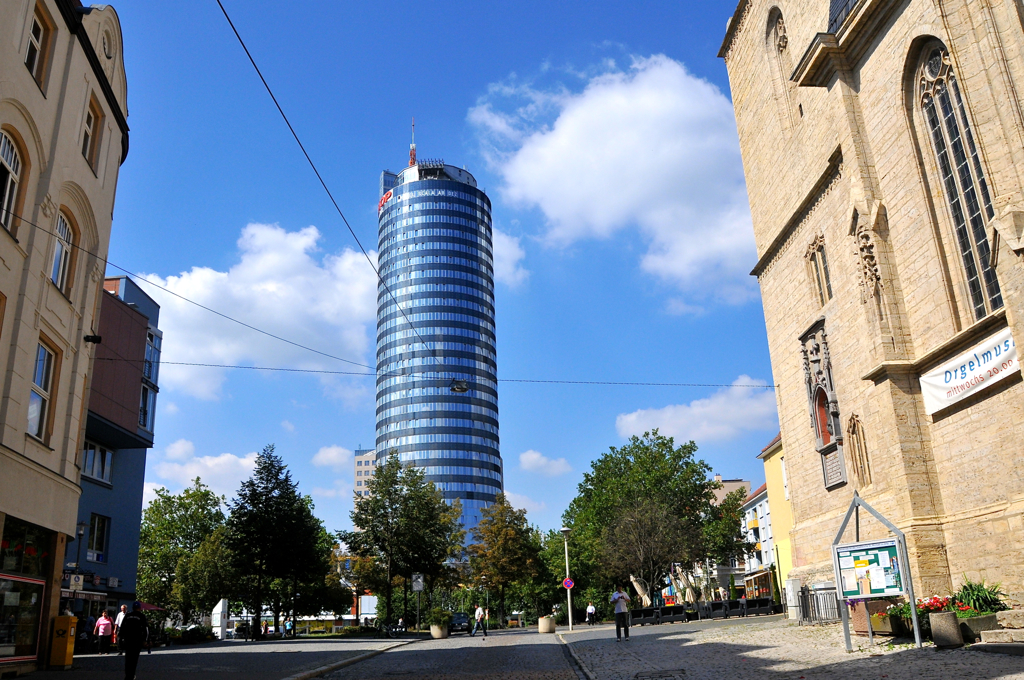
Jen Tower

=== Theatre and music ===
Jena has its own theatre and orchestra, the Jenaer Philharmonie.

=== Sports ===
Jena is home to professional football club FC Carl Zeiss Jena. The club won the DDR-Oberliga three times, the FDGB Cup four times, and reached the final of the UEFA Cup Winners' Cup once. Post-unification the club have been less successful and they currently compete in Regionalliga Nordost. In women's football, FF USV Jena is a member of the 2. Frauen-Bundesliga. Both clubs' home stadium is the Ernst-Abbe-Sportfeld. Also, the city's basketball team, Science City Jena played in Basketball Bundesliga in 2007–2008 season and returned to top level in 2015–16 season. In addition, since 2000, the university of Jena has a rugby team. Since 2012, the USV Rugby Jena team has been playing in the 2. Rugby-Bundesliga.

Current men's javelin throw world record (98.48) by Jan Železný was achieved in Jena.

== Economy and infrastructure ==
=== Agriculture, industry and services ===
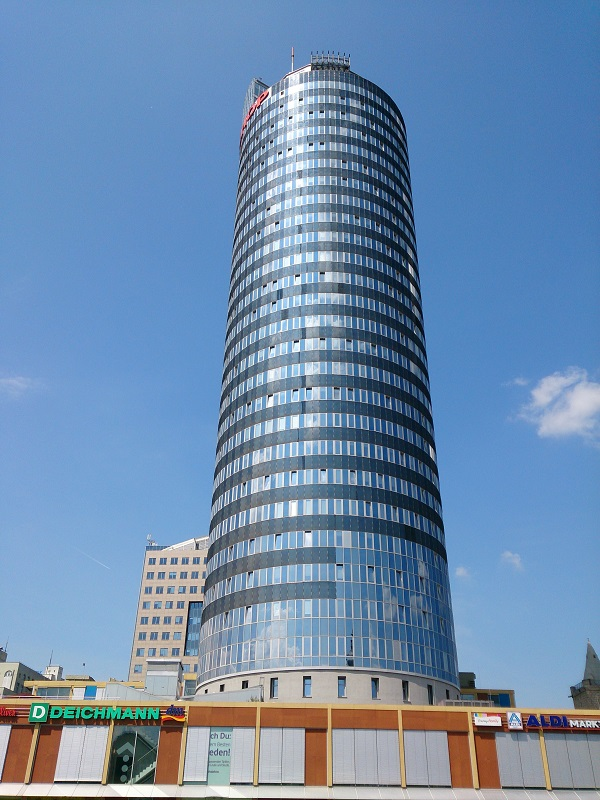
The Jen Tower is a symbol of East Germany's economy.

Agriculture plays a small role in Jena, only 40% of the municipal territory are in use for farming (compared to over 60% in Erfurt and nearly 50% in Weimar). Furthermore, the Muschelkalk soil is not very fertile and is often used as pasture for cattle. The only large agricultural area is situated around Isserstedt, Cospeda and Vierzehnheiligen district in the northwest. Wine-growing was discontinued during the Little Ice Age around 1800, but is now possible again due to global warming. Nevertheless, the commercial production of wine hasn't yet resumed.

Industry is a great tradition in Jena, reaching back to the mid-19th century. In 2012, there were 80 companies in industrial production with more than 20 workers employing 8,300 persons and generating a turnover of more than 1,5 billion Euro. The most important branches are precision machinery, pharmaceuticals, optics, biotechnology and software engineering. Notable companies in Jena are the traditional Carl Zeiss AG, Schott AG, Jenoptik and Jenapharm as well as new companies such as Intershop Communications, Analytik Jena, and Carl Zeiss Meditec. Jena has the most market-listed companies and is one of the most important economic centres of east Germany.

With companies such as Intershop Communications, Salesforce.com (after the acquisition of Demandware) and ePages as well as several web agencies, Jena is a hub for E-commerce in Germany. Other IT players with regional offices include Accenture or ESET. Jena-Optronik, a subsidiary of the Airbus Group, develops components for spaceflight or satellites in Jena.

The city is among Germany's 50 fastest growing regions, with many internationally renowned research institutes and companies, a comparatively low unemployment and a young population structure. Jena was awarded the title "Stadt der Wissenschaft" (city of science) by the Stifterverband für die Deutsche Wissenschaft, a German science association, in 2008.

Jena is also a hub of public and private services, specially in education, research and business services. Other important institutions are the High Court of Thuringia and Thuringia's solely university hospital. Furthermore, Jena is a regional centre in infrastructure and retail with many shopping centres.

Together with the photonics lab Lichtwerkstatt and the Krautspace there are makerspaces and hackerspaces enabling start-ups to create their product ideas and realizing their first prototype and business models as well as networking.

=== Transport ===
==== By rail ====
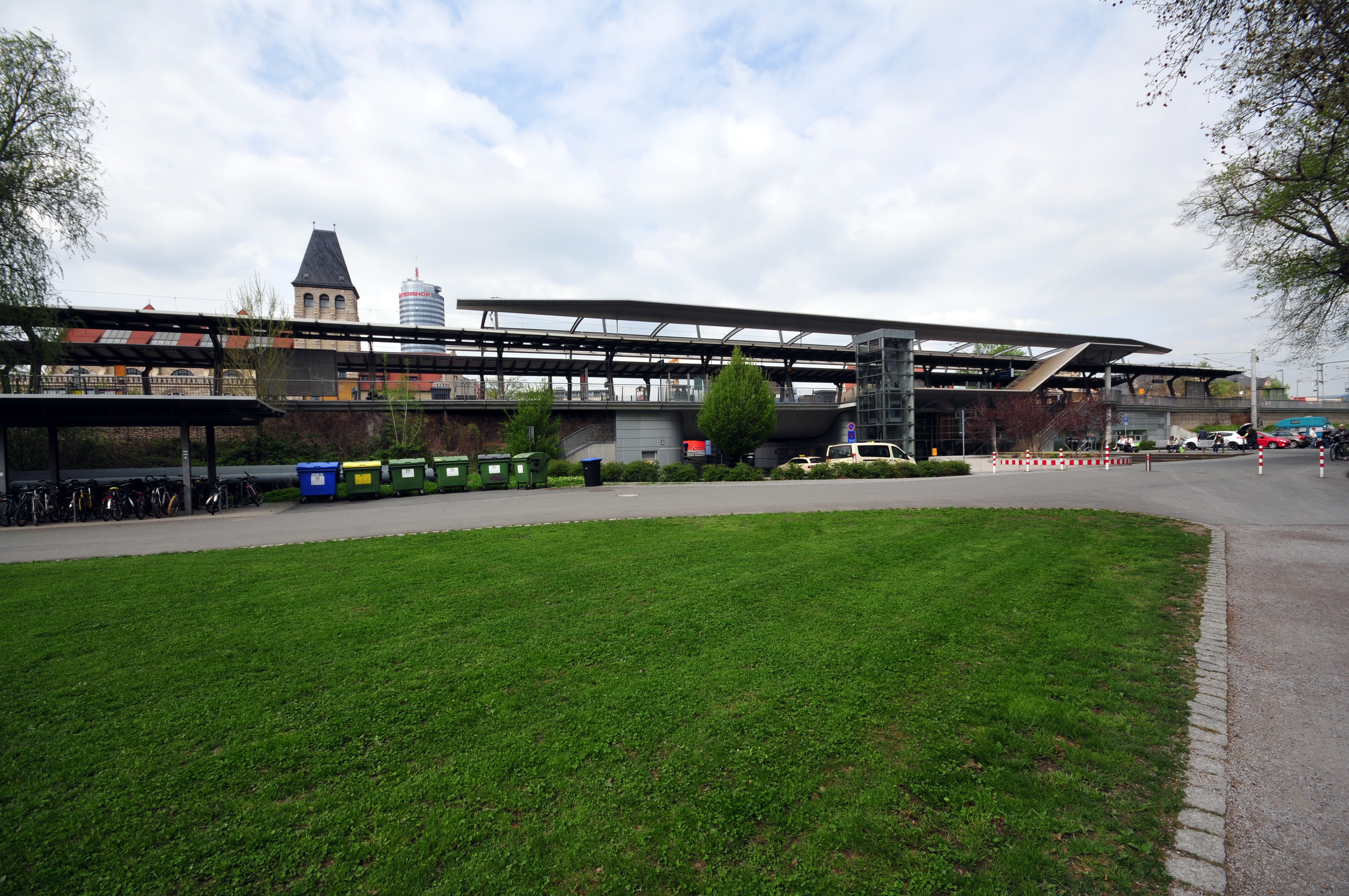
Paradies station

Jena has no central railway station with connection to all the lines at one point. What is relatively common in many countries is quite unusual for a German city and caused on the one hand by the city's difficult topography and on the other hand by the history, because the two main lines were built by two different private companies. The connection in north–south direction is the Saal Railway with ICE trains running from Berlin in the north to Munich in the south once a day stopping at Paradies station and local trains to Naumburg and Saalfeld stopping at Zwätzen, Saalbahnhof, Paradies and Göschwitz. The connection in west–east direction is the Weimar–Gera railway with regional express trains to Göttingen (via Erfurt and Weimar) and Zwickau, Glauchau, Altenburg or Greiz (via Gera) and local trains between Weimar, Jena and Gera. The express trains stop at West station near the city centre and Göschwitz, the local trains furthermore at Neue Schenke. The junction between both lines is the Göschwitz station, approx. 5 km (3 mi) south of the city centre.

When the Nuremberg–Erfurt high-speed railway opened in 2017, the city lost its connection to the long-distance train network. As compensation, there are new regional express train services to Halle and Leipzig in the north, and to Nuremberg in the south.

==== By road ====
The two Autobahnen crossing each other nearby at Hermsdorf junction are the Bundesautobahn 4 (Frankfurt–Dresden) and the Bundesautobahn 9 (Berlin–Munich), which were both built during the 1930s. The A 4 runs quite next to the Lobeda housing complexes and the Leutra district. Therefore, it was rebuilt in the 2000s and got two tunnels to protect the residents and the environment against noise and air pollution. Furthermore, there are two Bundesstraßen crossing in Jena: the Bundesstraße 7 is a connection to Weimar in the west and Gera in the east and the Bundesstraße 88 is a connection along Saale valley to Naumburg in the north and Rudolstadt in the south. Furthermore, there are some roads to Apolda via Isserstedt, Blankenhain via Ammerbach and Stadtroda via Lobeda. Most parts of city centre inside the former walls are pedestrian areas.

==== By air ====
The nearest airports to Jena are Erfurt–Weimar Airport, approx. 50 km (31 mi) to the west and Leipzig/Halle Airport, approx. 80 km (50 mi) to the northeast, which both serve mostly holiday flights to the Mediterranean and other holiday destinations. The nearest major airports are Frankfurt Airport, Berlin Brandenburg Airport and Munich Airport.

==== By bike ====
Despite the hilly terrain in some parts, Jena is a cycling city thanks to its large student population. Cycling has become more popular since the 1990s when good quality bike paths began to be built. There are bike lanes along some main roads, though cycling infrastructure is less developed compared with what exists in other German cities.

For bicycle touring there is the "Saale cycle route" (German: Saale-Radweg) and the "Towns of Thuringia cycle route" (German: Radweg Thüringer Städtekette). Both of these connect points of tourist interest: the former along the Saale valley from Fichtel Mountains in Bavaria to the Elbe river near Magdeburg, while the latter follows the medieval Via Regia closely and runs from Eisenach via Erfurt, Weimar and Jena to Altenburg via Gera.

==== Trams and buses ====
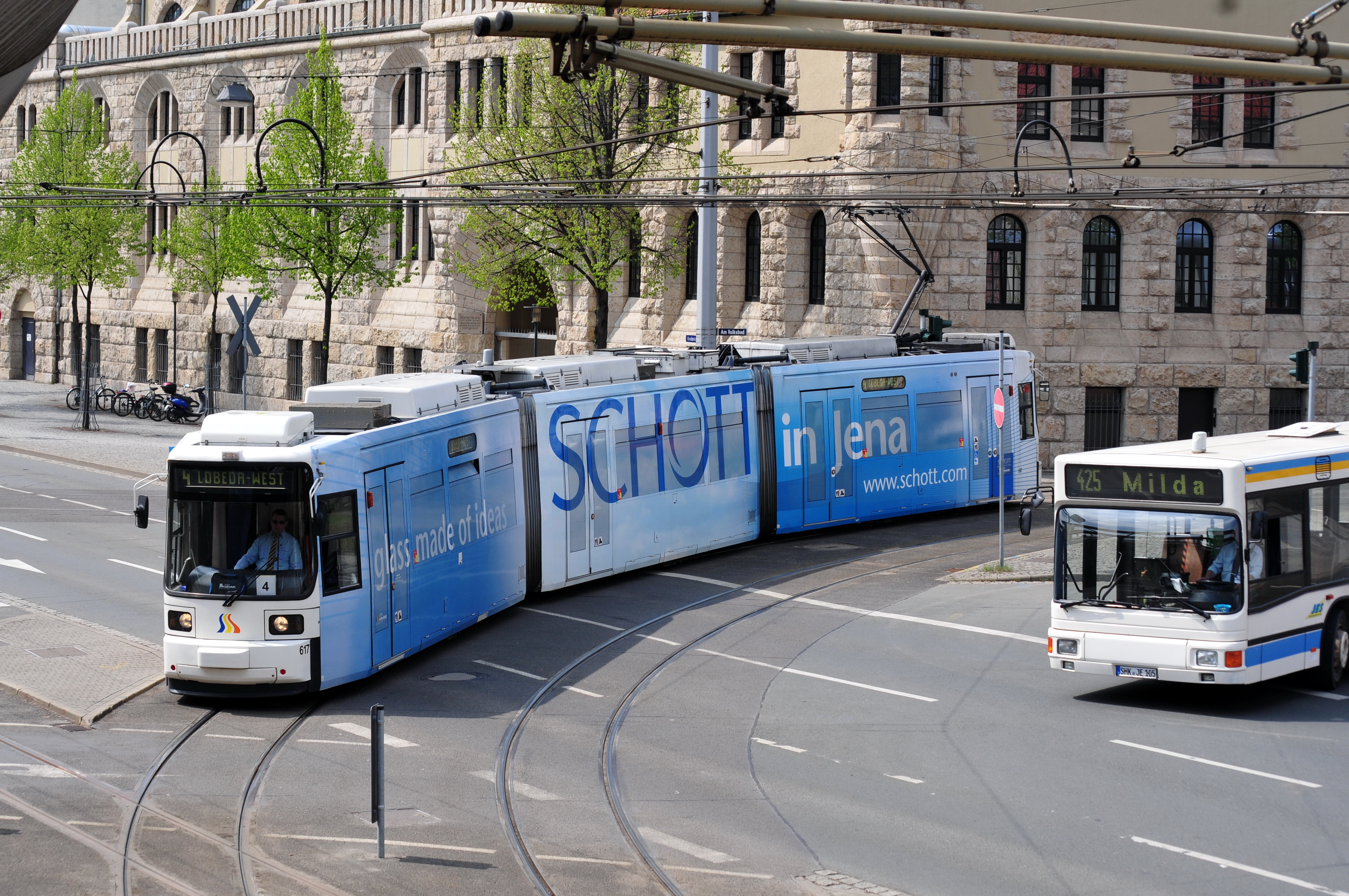
A tram near Jena Paradies Station

The Jena tramway network was established in 1901 and enlarged after German reunification. It connects the major districts with the city centre; there are 5 ordinary lines served in different intervals between 7.5 and 20 minutes. Nevertheless, there are some old single-track segments interfering the services. Furthermore, there is an extensive network of buses, run (such as the trams) by the "Jenah" organization, a pun on Jena and the German Nahverkehr lit. 'public transport'. Buses of the JES Verkehrsgesellschaft connect Jena with cities and villages in the region.

=== Education and research ===
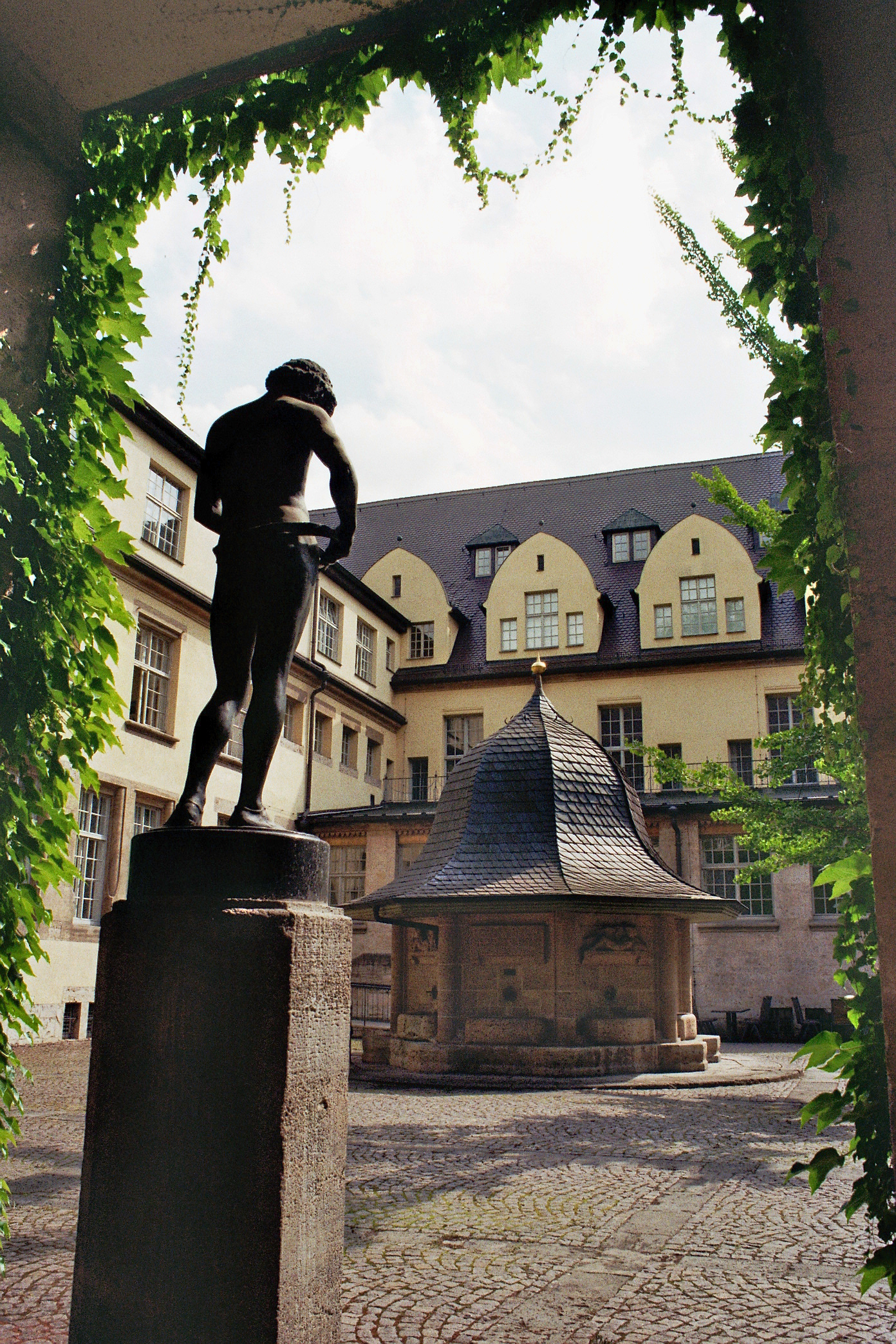
University of Jena

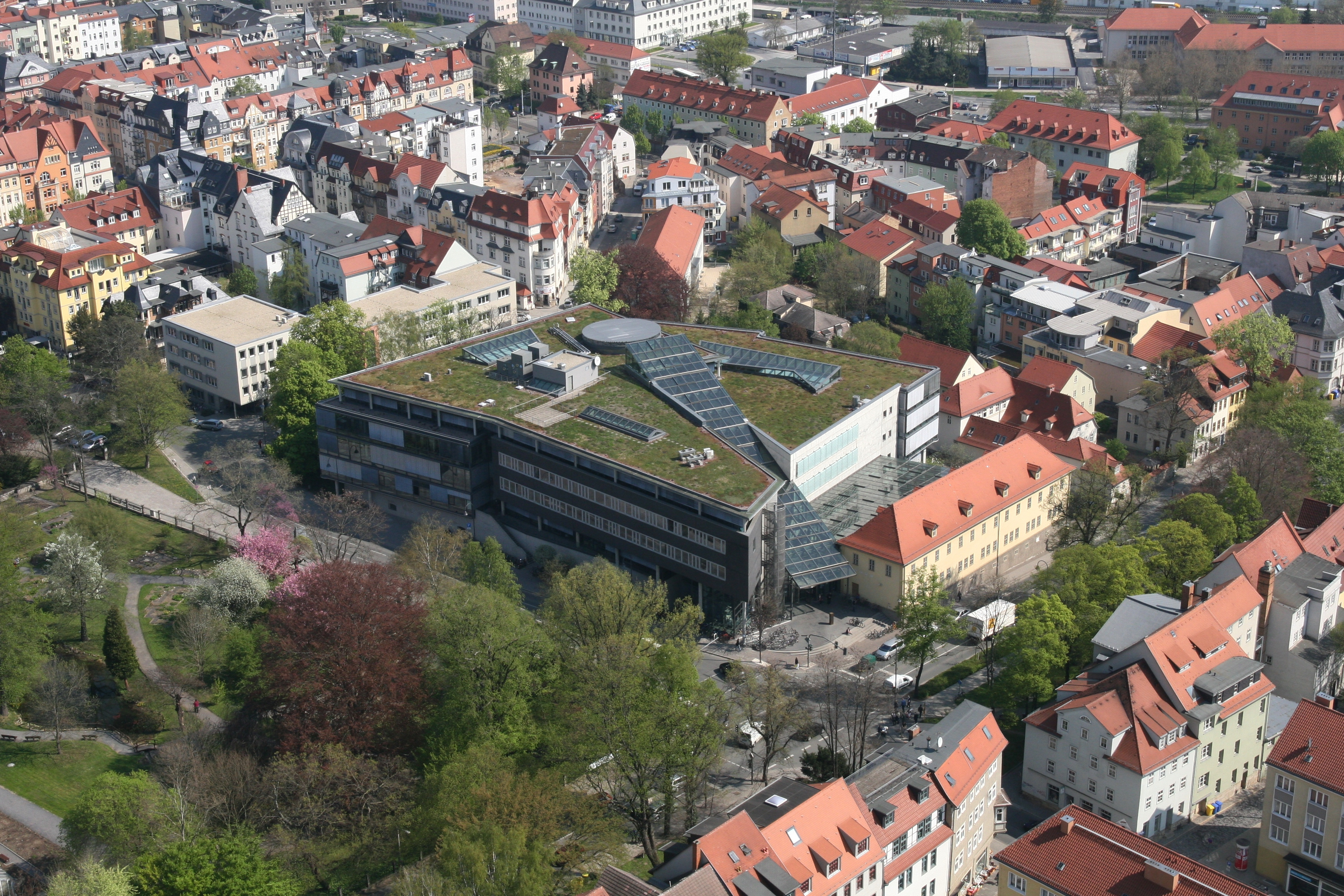
University Library

After reunification, the educational system was realigned. The University of Jena, established in 1558, was largely extended. Today there are approximately 21,000 students at this university. Another college is the Ernst-Abbe-Hochschule Jena, a University of Applied Sciences founded in 1991 which offers a combination of scientific training and its practical applications. There are also nearly 5,000 students.

Further there are six Gymnasiums, five state-owned and one Christian (ecumenical). One of the state-owned is a Sportgymnasium, an elite boarding school for young talents in athletics or football. Another state-owned Gymnasium (the Carl-Zeiss-Gymnasium Jena) offers a focus in sciences also as an elite boarding school additionally to the common curriculum.

The various research institutes based in Jena include:

- The Max Planck Institute for Chemical Ecology is an important research center and offers a Ph.D. program
- The Max Planck Institute for the Science of Human History
- The Max Planck Institute for Biogeochemistry
- The Institute of Photonic Technology
- The Fraunhofer Institute for Applied Optics and Precision Engineering (IOF)
- The Leibniz Institute for Age Research, a research center with a Ph.D. program
- INNOVENT - a private research center
- The Leibniz Institute for Natural Product Research and Infection Biology
- Friedrich-Löffler-Institute of Bacterial Infections and Zoonoses
- Friedrich-Löffler-Institute of Molecular Pathogenesis
- The Jena Center for Bioinformatics

== Quality of life ==
In 2013, according to a study by Kieler Institut für Weltwirtschaft, Jena was ranked as the fifth-most livable city in Germany.

According to the 2019 study by Forschungsinstitut Prognos, Jena is one of the most dynamic regions in Germany. It ranks at number 29 of all 401 German regions.

== Politics ==
=== Mayor and city council ===
The first freely elected mayor after German reunification was Peter Röhlinger of the Free Democratic Party (FDP), who served from 1990 to 2006. In 2006 he was succeeded by Albrecht Schröter of the Social Democratic Party (SPD). Schröter was defeated seeking re-election in 2018 by Thomas Nitzsche of the FDP, who has since served as mayor. The most recent mayoral election was held on 26 May 2024, with a runoff held on 9 June, and the results were as follows:

Candidate	Party	First round		Second round	
Candidate	Party	Votes	%	Votes	%
Thomas Nitzsche	Free Democratic Party	13,185	25.3	30,835	61.8
Kathleen Lützkendorf	Alliance 90/The Greens	8,012	15.4	19,028	38.2
Jens Thomas	The Left	6,960	13.4		
Denny Jankowski	Alternative for Germany	6,588	12.7		
Stephan Wydra	Christian Democratic Union	6,274	12.1		
Johannes Schleußner	Social Democratic Party	6,110	11.7		
Ulf Weißleder	Citizens for Jena	3,913	7.5		
Peter Gutjahr	Independent	982	1.9		
Valid votes		52,024	99.3	49,863	95.8
Invalid votes		359	0.7	2,211	4.2
Total		52,383	100.0	52,074	100.0
Electorate/voter turnout		82,605	63.4	82,408	63.2
Source: Wahlen Jena

The most recent city council election was held on 26 May 2024, and the results were as follows:

Party	Lead candidate	Votes	%	+/-	Seats	+/-
Christian Democratic Union (CDU)	Guntram Wothly	25,479	16.9	▲4.3	8	▲2
The Left (Die Linke)	Jens Thomas	25,354	16.8	▼3.6	8	▼1
Alliance 90/The Greens (Grüne)	Kathleen Lützkendorf	22,966	15.2	▼4.2	7	▼2
Alternative for Germany (AfD)	Denny Jankowski	20,149	13.4	▲3.4	6	▲1
Social Democratic Party (SPD)	Johannes Schleußner	19,622	13.0	▲0.4	6	0
Free Democratic Party (FDP)	Thomas Nitzsche	13,590	9.0	▼3.8	4	▼2
Citizens for Jena (BfJ)	Jürgen Häkanson-Hall	10,456	6.9	▼0.6	3	0
Volt Germany	Johanna Grenzer	7,843	5.2	New	2	New
Citizens for Thuringia/dieBasis	Peter Faesel	2,823	1.9	New	1	New
Free Voters Jena	Bertram Pelzer	2,452	1.6	▼1.8	1	0
Valid votes		150,734	100.0			
Invalid ballots		1,521	2.9			
Total ballots		52,054	100.0		46	±0
Electorate/voter turnout		82,605	63.0	▼0.1		
Source: Wahlen in Thüringen

== Sister cities ==
Jena's sister cities include:

- Panyu, Guangzhou, China
- Aubervilliers, France
- Plomeur, France
- Erlangen, Germany
- San Marcos, Nicaragua
- Beit Jala, Palestine
- Porto, Portugal
- Lugoj, Romania
- Vladimir, Russia
- Berkeley, California, United States

== Notable people ==
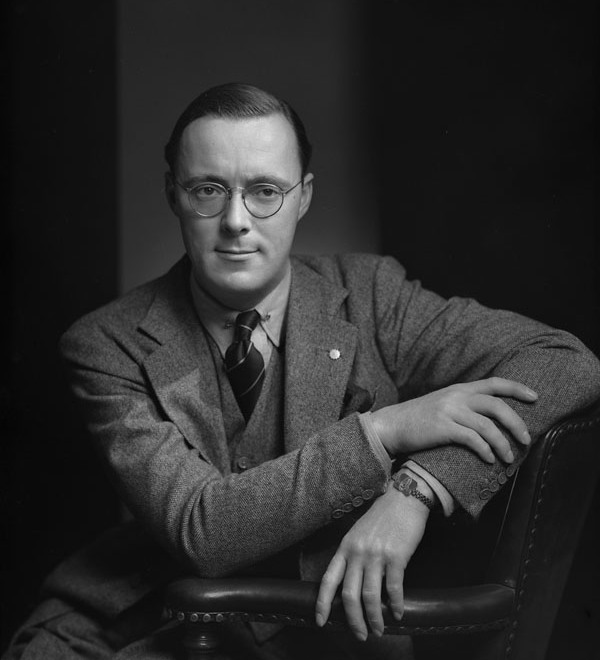
Prince Bernhard of Lippe-Biesterfeld in 1942

- Ernst Abbe (1840–1905), physicist, social reformer, partner of Carl Zeiss and Otto Schott
- August Batsch (1761–1802), naturalist, born, lived and died in Jena
- Andreas Bauer Kanabas, classical bass
- Johannes R. Becher (1891–1958), poet and politician
- Hans Berger (1873–1941), discoverer of human electroencephalography
- Prince Bernhard of Lippe-Biesterfeld (1911-2004), prince consort of the Netherlands
- Johann Friedrich Blumenbach, naturalist, doctor, comparative anatomist, and physiologist
- Walter von Boetticher (1853–1945), historian, and physician, studied medicine at Jena
- Martin Dwars (born 1987), retired footballer (goalkeeper)
- Johann Gottfried Eichhorn (1752–1827), orientalist and Protestant theologian of the Enlightenment
- Robert Enke (1977–2009), footballer (goalkeeper)
- Walter Eucken (1891–1950), founder of neoliberal economic theory
- Rudolf Christoph Eucken (1846–1926), philosopher and winner of the 1908 Nobel Prize for Literature
- Johann Gottlieb Fichte, philosopher and early German nationalist
- Gottlob Frege (1848–1925), mathematician, logician, and philosopher
- Friedrich Wilhelm August Fröbel, inventor of the kindergarten
- Johann Wolfgang von Goethe (1749–1832), poet and writer
- John B. Goodenough (1922–2023), materials scientist, solid-state physicist, and Nobel laureate in chemistry
- Klara Griefahn (1897–1945), physician
- Otto Günsche (1917–2003), commander in the Waffen-SS during the Second World War
- Ernst Haeckel (1834–1919), evolutionary biologist and zoologist
- G. W. F. Hegel (1770–1831), philosopher
- Friedrich Hölderlin (1770–1843), poet
- Albert Woldemar Hollander (1796–1868), educator and pedagog
- Gottfried Wilhelm Leibniz (1646–1716), polymath and philosopher
- Martin Luther (1483–1546), professor of theology, priest, author, composer, Augustinian friar, and seminal figure in the Reformation
- August Eduard Martin (1847–1933), obstetrician and gynecologist
- Karl Marx (1818–1883), philosopher and economist
- Tilo Medek (1940–2006), composer
- Philipp Melanchthon, theologian
- Johann Karl August Musäus (1735–1787), author
- Friedrich Wilhelm Nietzsche (1844–1900), philosopher
- Novalis (1772–1801), poet
- Max Reger, composer, pianist, professor, and conductor
- Friedrich Schelling, philosopher
- Friedrich Schiller, poet and writer
- Helmut Kämpfe, sturmbannführer
- Caroline Böhmer Schlegel Schelling, Universitätsmamsell and Jena Romanticist intellectual
- Stefan Schuster, professor of bioinformatics at the University of Jena
- Wilhelm Schlegel, philosopher
- Hans Starcke, artist
- Sahra Wagenknecht (born 1969), German politician
- Bernd Schneider (born 1973), footballer
- Otto Schott, inventor of fireproof glass, founder of the Schott glass works
- Reinhard Johannes Sorge, poet, dramatist, and Roman Catholic convert
- Johann Gustav Stickel, orientalist
- Kurt Tucholsky, writer
- Tim Wuttke, (born 1987), retired footballer
- Carl Zeiss (1816–1888), founder of the Zeiss company
