= Marchand =

Marchand (French pronunciation: [maʁʃɑ̃]) is a frequent surname in France, in Quebec, and in Louisiana. (French word for merchant). It is sometimes anglicized to "Merchant", "Marchant", or "Merchand", all with similar pronunciations to Marchand.

== People ==
The surname may refer to:

=== A ===
- Albert Gallatin Marchand (1811–1848), Democratic member of the U.S. House of Representatives from Pennsylvania
- André Marchand (painter) (1907–1997), French painter of the new Paris school
- André Marchand (politician) (1926–2011), politician of the Quebec Liberal Party
- Angel M. Marchand (1912–2005), Puerto Rican physician and researcher
- Anne-Marie Marchand (1927–2005), French costume designer

=== B ===
- Bertrand Marchand (born 1953), French soccer trainer
- Blaine Marchand (born 1949), Canadian writer
- Brad Marchand (born 1988), Canadian ice hockey player
- Bruno Marchand (born 1972), Canadian politician

=== C ===
- Charmaine Marchand-Stiaes, American politician
- Christophe Marchand (born 1972), French freestyle swimmer
- Clément Marchand (1912–2013), Canadian writer
- Colette Marchand (1925–2015), French dancer and actress
- Corinne Marchand (born 1931), French actress

=== D ===
- David Marchand (1776–1832), member of the U.S. House of Representatives from Pennsylvania

=== E ===
- Érik Marchand (1955–2025), Breton musician
- Étienne Marchand (1755–1793), French ship captain and explorer

=== F ===
- Félix-Gabriel Marchand (1832–1900), Canadian journalist, author, and politician in Quebec
- Felix Jacob Marchand (1846–1928), German pathologist

=== G ===
- Gerald Marchand (1921–2005), British Olympian in canoeing
- Gilles Marchand (born 1963), French film director
- Guy Marchand (1937–2023), French actor and singer

=== H ===
- Hans Marchand (1907–1978), German linguist
- Henri Marchand (1877–1960), French-American sculptor
- Hugo Marchand (born 1993), French ballet dancer

=== I ===
- Inga Marchand (born 1978), better known as Foxy Brown, an American rapper

=== J ===
- Jackie Marchand, television writer and producer
- Jean Marchand (1918–1988), French Canadian trade unionist and politician
- Jean-Baptiste Marchand (1863–1934), French emissary in Africa
- Jean Gabriel Marchand (1765–1851), French general under Napoleon
- Jean Hippolyte Marchand (1883–1941), French painter
- Jean-Paul Marchand (born 1944), member of the Canadian House of Commons and professor
- Joseph Marchand (1803–1835), one of the Vietnamese Martyrs
- Joséphine Marchand, (1861–1925) Canadian journalist and feminist

=== L ===
- Léon Marchand (born 2002), French World Champion & Olympic Swimmer
- Leonard Marchand (1933–2016), Canadian politician
- Louis Marchand (1669–1732), French virtuoso organist and harpsichordist
- Louis-Joseph Marchand (1692—1774), French music theorist, composer, choir director, and priest
- Louis-Joseph-Narcisse Marchand (1791–1876), Napoleon's first valet

=== M ===
- Max Marchand (1888–1957), Dutch chess master
- Meche Marchand or Rivka Marchand, Jewish actress and author

=== N ===
- Nancy Marchand (1928–2000), American actress
- Nestor Léon Marchand (1833–1911), French doctor and botanist
- Nick Marchand, Australian theatre director

=== P ===
- Philippe Marchand (1939–2018), French politician
- Pierre Marchand (editor) (1939–2002), French editor and publisher
- Pierre Marchand (fencer) (born 1948), French fencer
- Pierre Marchand (born 1958), Canadian musician and record producer

=== R ===
- Richard Felix Marchand (1813–1850), German chemist
- Robert Marchand (athlete) (1904–1983), French olympian in hurdling
- Robert Marchand (cyclist) (1911–2021), French cyclist
- Romany Marie Marchand (1885–1961), Greenwich Village restaurateur

=== S ===
- Sidney A. Marchand (1887–1972), American lawyer, politician and author
- Steve Marchand (born 1974), mayor of Portsmouth, New Hampshire
- Suzanne L. Marchand (born 1961), American intellectual historian

=== T ===
- Theodore J. Marchand, American politician

=== X ===
- Xavier Marchand (born 1973), French medley swimmer

=== Y ===
- Yannick Marchand (footballer, born 1988), Belgian footballer
- Yannick Marchand (footballer, born 2000), Swiss footballer
- Yves Marchand, Swiss bobsledder
- Yves Marchand and Romain Meffre, French photographer duo

== Places ==
- Marchand, Manitoba, Canada
- Marchand, Northern Cape, South Africa
- Marchand, Louisiana
- Marchand, Ohio
- Marchand, Pennsylvania
- Marchand, Quebec, a community in Rivière-Rouge

== See also ==
- Jean Baptiste Louis DeCourtel Marchand (died 1722), French military commanding officer of Fort Toulouse now called Fort Jackson
- Marchand de cailloux, studio album from the French musician Renaud
- Marchand Mission
- Marchant
- Merchant (surname)
