= History of human sexuality =

Human sexuality and sexual behavior—along with its taboos, regulation, and social and political impact—has had a profound effect on the various cultures of the world since prehistoric times.

== The study of the history of human sexuality ==
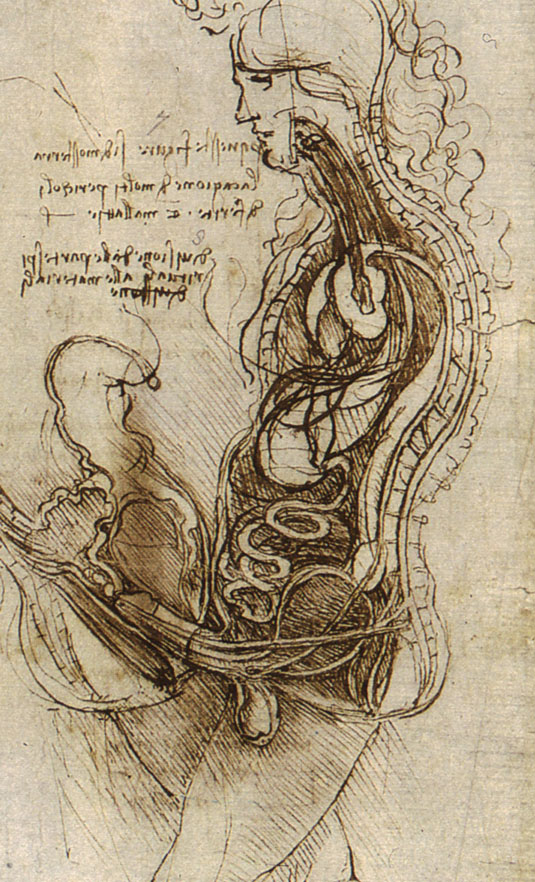
"Coition of a Hemisected Man and Woman" (c. 1492), an interpretation of what happens inside the body during vaginal intercourse, by Leonardo da Vinci

Modern explanations of the origins of human sexuality are based in evolutionary biology, and specifically the field of human behavioral ecology. Evolutionary biology shows that the human genotype, like that of all other organisms, is the result of those ancestors who reproduced with greater frequency than others. The resultant sexual behavior adaptations are thus not an "attempt" on the part of the individual to maximize reproduction in a given situation—natural selection does not "see" into the future. Instead, current behavior is probably the result of selective forces that occurred in the Pleistocene.

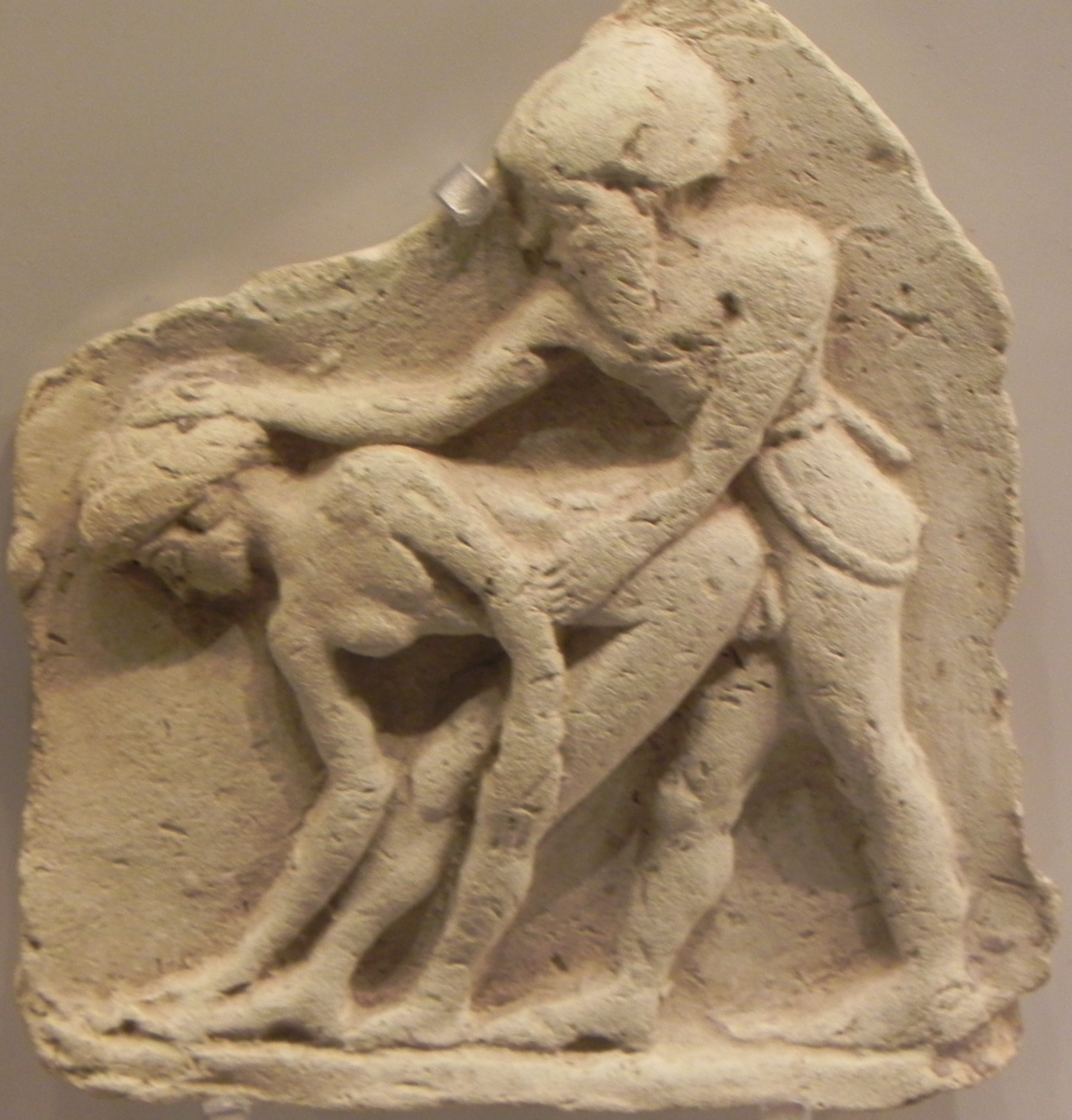
Sex between a female and a male on a clay plaque. Mesopotamia 2000 BCE

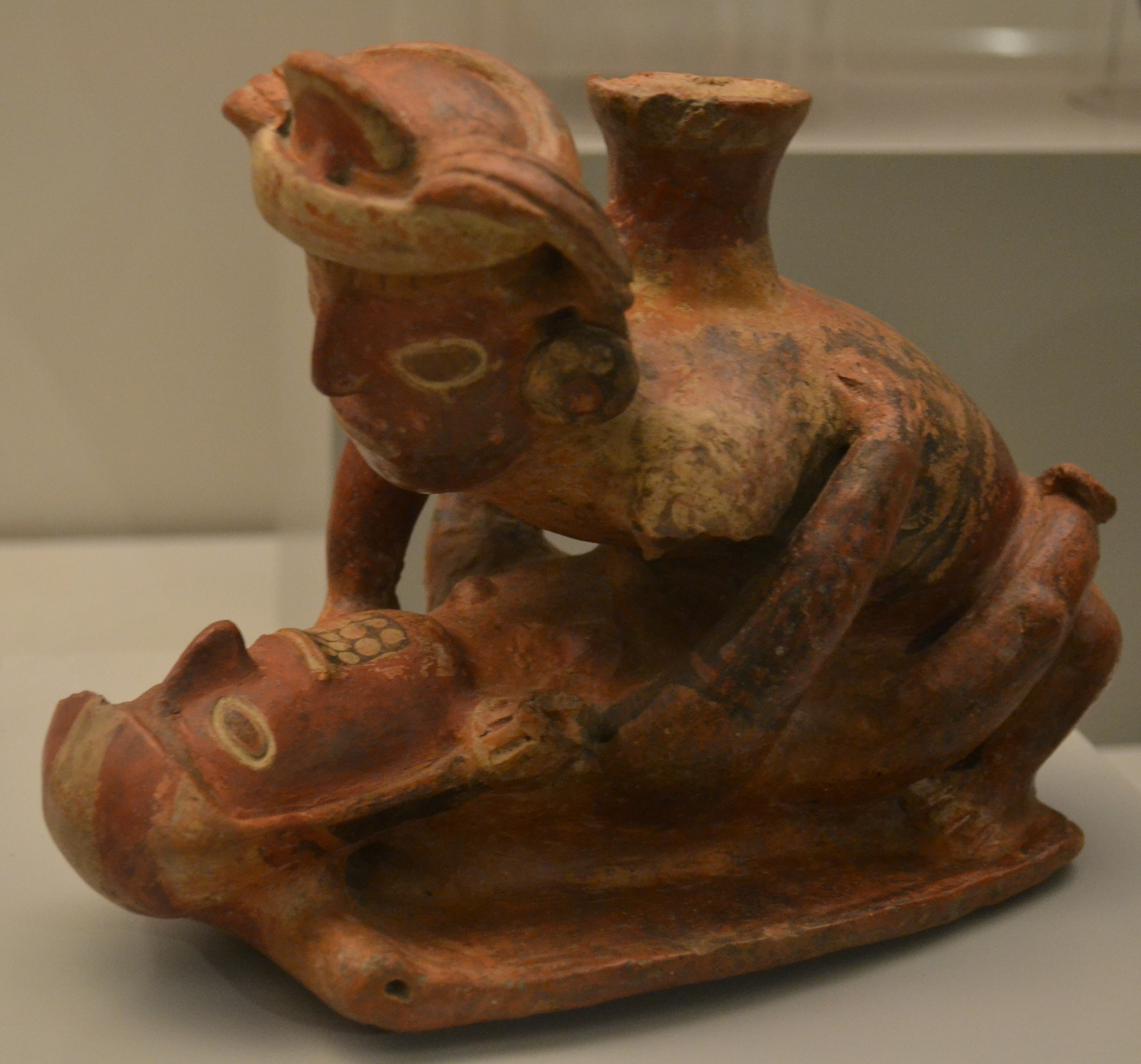
A Recuay painted vessel. Terracotta. Peru. Museum of America, Madrid. 400 BCE – 300 CE.

=== Sources ===
Sexual speech—and by extension, writing—has been subject to varying standards of decorum since the beginning of history. For most of historic time writing has not been used by more than a small part of the total population of any society. The resulting self-censorship and euphemistic forms translate today into a dearth of explicit and accurate evidence on which to base a history. There are a number of primary sources that can be collected across a wide variety of times and cultures, including the following:

- Records of legislation indicating either encouragement or prohibition
- Religious and philosophical texts recommending, condemning or debating the topic
- Literary sources, perhaps unpublished during their authors' lifetimes, including diaries and personal correspondence
- Medical textbooks treating various forms as a pathological condition
- Linguistic developments, particularly in slang.
- More recently, studies of sexuality

== Sex in various cultures ==
=== Native Americans ===
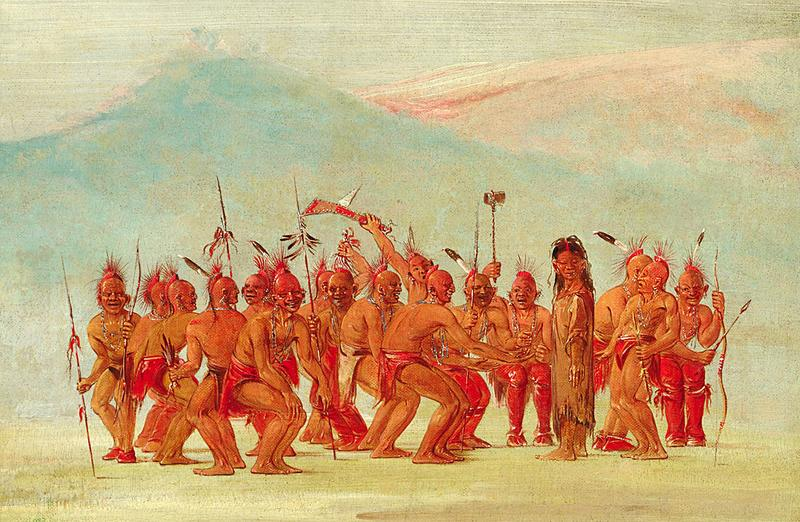
A sketch by George Caitlin (1796–1872), done while among the Sac and Fox Native Americans, which shows a celebratory ceremonial dance for a two spirit person

The history of sexuality and gender expression varied among the vast diaspora of Indigenous tribes. The berdache, a cross-gender role, existed in the tribes of the Kaska of the Yukon Territory, the Klamath of southern Oregon, and the Mohave, Cocopa, and Maricopa of the Colorado River in pre-colonial times. Berdache individuals partook in the traditional roles of the other sex, including their mannerisms and labour. Cross-gender females in the Mohave tribe conducted ceremonies in which they would fully berdache females as males, giving them the right to marry women. The term berdache is considered outdated in the modern era, with it being commonly replaced by the term 'two spirit' which emphasises how Native Americans themselves viewed these individuals. For most Native Americans, the person's spirit was more important than their physical body, and for them a person who transgressed from their original gender took on a third one, separate from the male or female gender. Two spirit natives would often be a part of same sex relationships, as they would fulfil the necessary duties of a family unit that was expected in Native societies.

However, two spirit individuals of the same sex did not marry one another as the roles Native Americans played in marriages mattered more than sexuality, with sexuality not as imbedded as an identity as it is currently. The cross gender identity faded away in the late 19th century due to pressure and domination by white settlers and their imposition of their sexual values and ideologies on Native American tribes, which asserted that the female gender was inferior, and that homosexuality was unnatural.

Conceptions of marriage also varied among the many tribes. The Navajos for instance practiced polygyny, with customs entailing that the wives must be related or of the same clan. The practice was banned in July 1945 by the Navajo Tribal Council due to pressure from the United States Government which sought to end the practice, as it enacted its own prohibitions on polygamy.

=== India ===
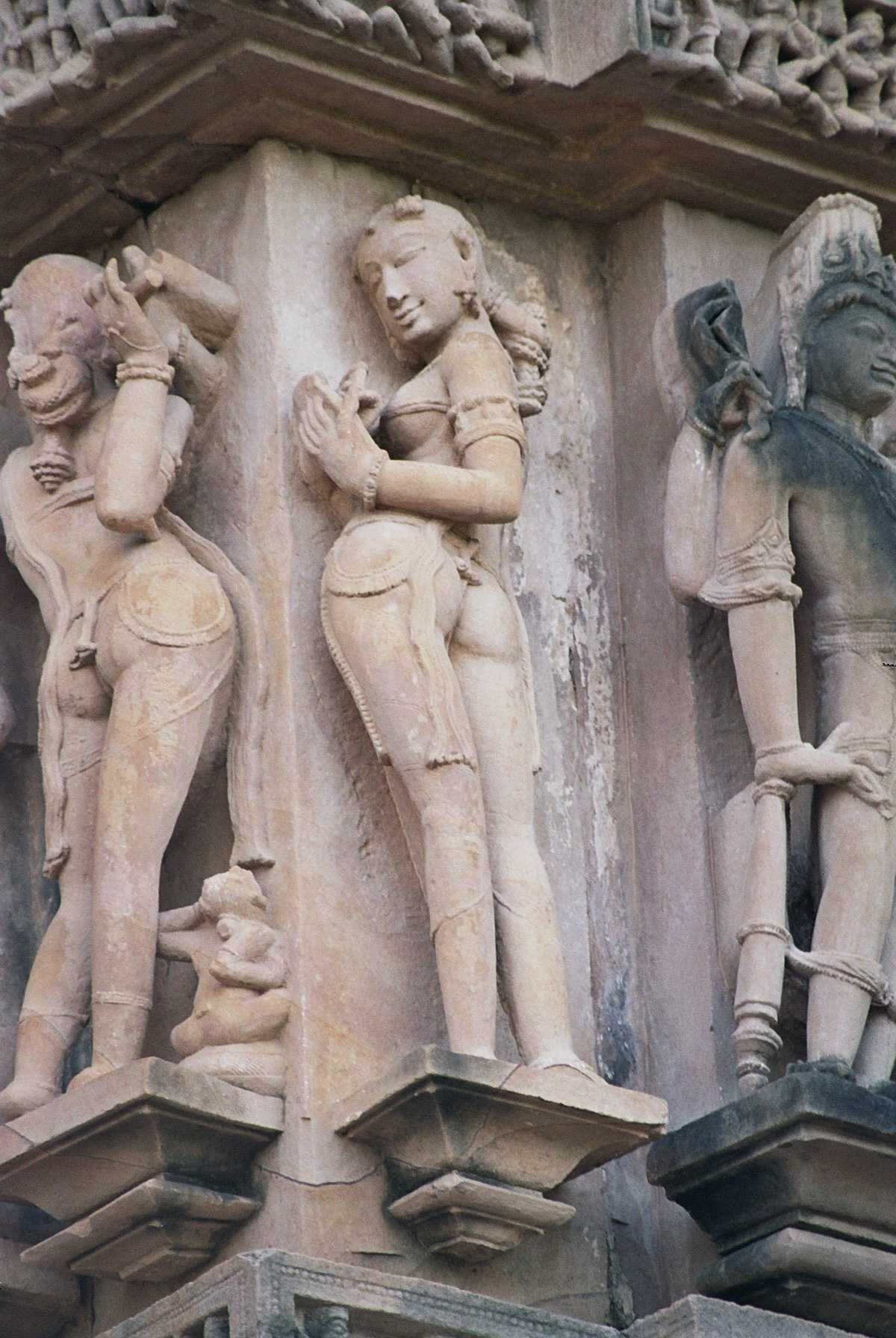
Depictions of Apsarases from the Khajuraho temple

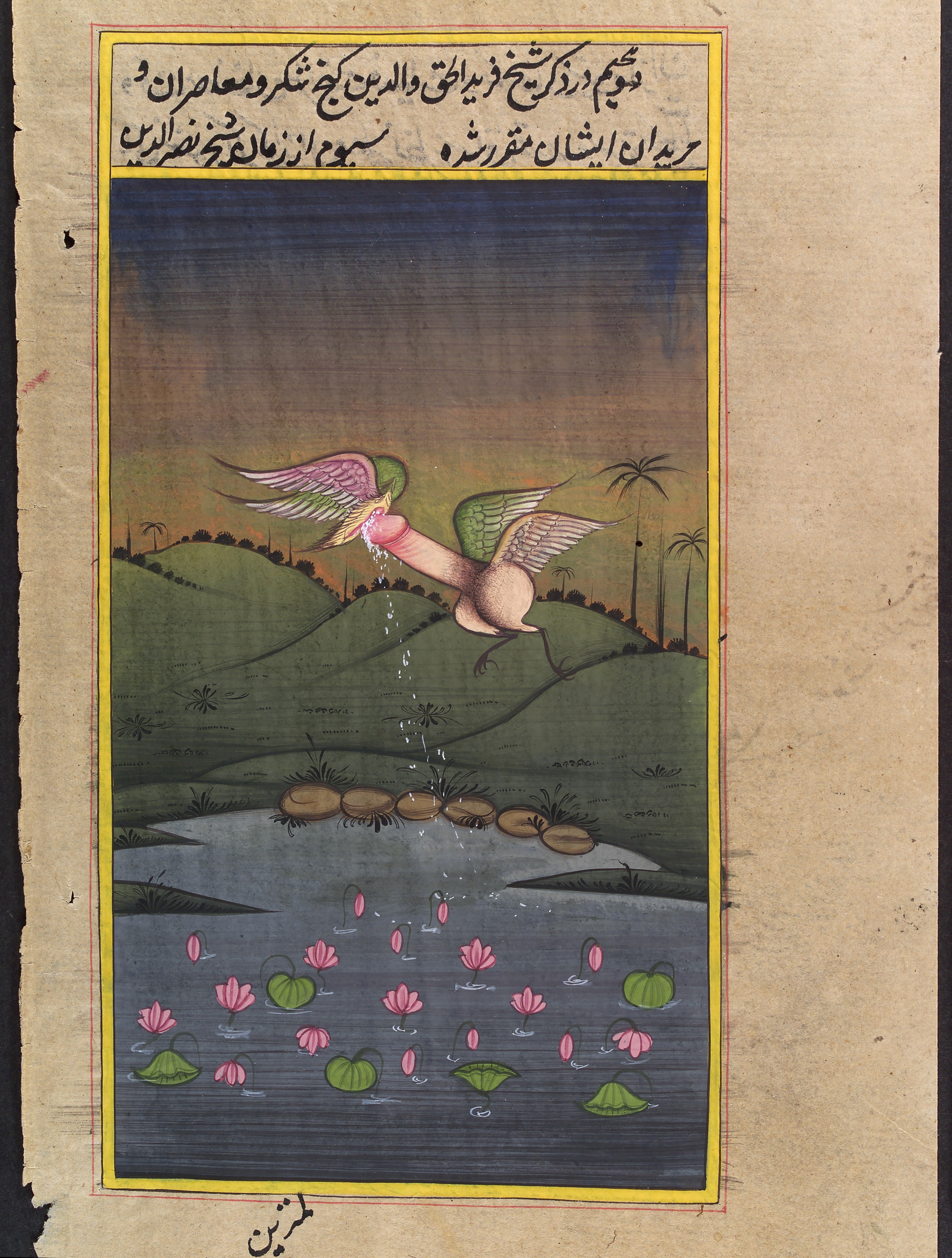
A flying penis copulating with a flying vulva. Gouache painting

India played a significant role in the history of sex, from writing one of the first literatures that treated sexual intercourse as a science, to in modern times being the origin of the philosophical focus of new-age groups' attitudes on sex. It may be argued that India pioneered the use of sexual education through art and literature. As in many societies, there was a difference in sexual practices in India between common people and powerful rulers, with people in power often indulging in lifestyles that were not representative of common moral attitudes.

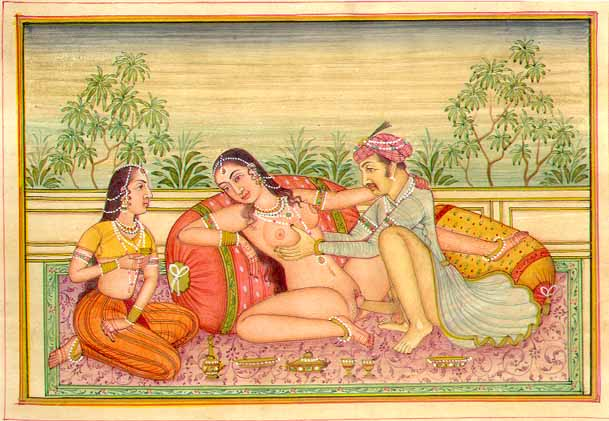
Painting from the Kama Sutra

The first evidence of attitudes towards sex comes from the ancient texts of Hinduism, Buddhism and Jainism. These most ancient of Hindu texts, the Vedas, reveal moral perspectives on sexuality, marriage and fertility prayers. Sex magic featured in a number of Vedic rituals, most significantly in the Asvamedha Yajna, where the ritual culminated with the chief queen lying with the dead horse in a simulated sexual act; clearly a fertility rite intended to safeguard and increase the kingdom's productivity and martial prowess. The epics of ancient India, the Ramayana and Mahabharata had a huge effect on the culture of Asia, influencing later Chinese, Japanese, Tibetan and South East Asian culture. These texts support the view that in ancient India, sex was considered a mutual duty between a married couple.

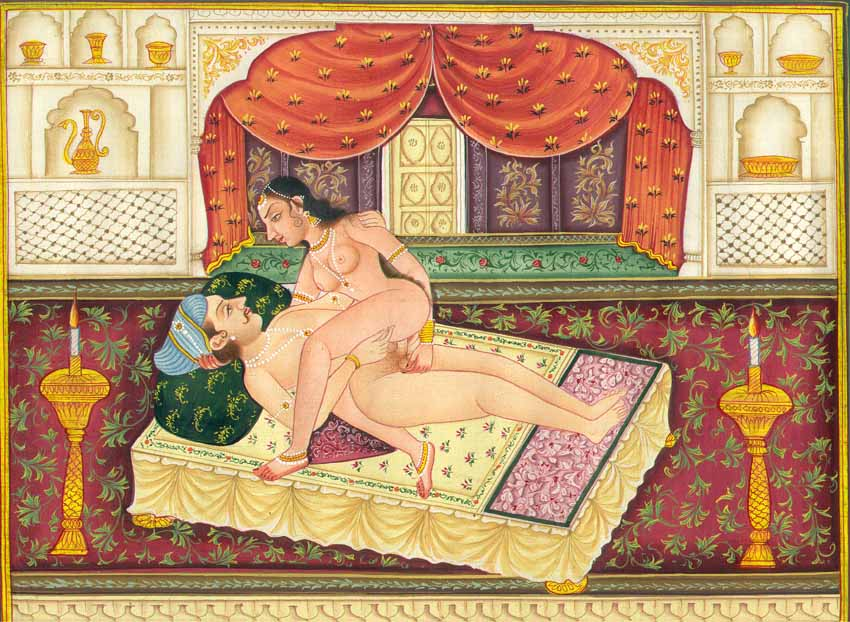
Painting from the Kama Sutra

The most publicly known sexual literature of India are the texts of the Kama Sutra. These texts were written for and kept by the philosopher, warrior and nobility castes, their servants and concubines, and those in certain religious orders. These were people that could also read and write and had instruction and education. The sixty-four arts of love-passion-pleasure began in India. There are many different versions of the arts which began in Sanskrit and were translated into other languages, such as Persian or Tibetan. Many of the original texts are missing and the only clue to their existence is in other texts. Kama Sutra, the version by Vatsyayana, is one of the well-known survivors and was first translated into English by Sir Richard Burton and F.F. Arbuthnot.

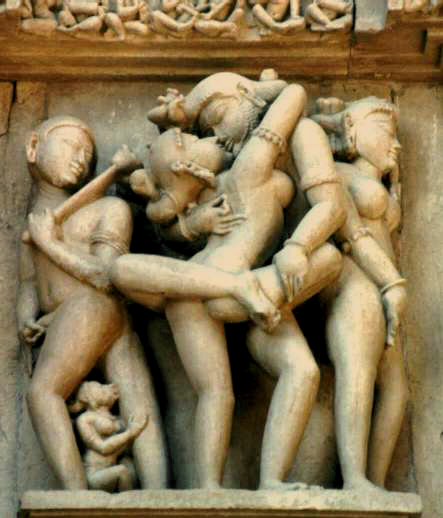
Sculpture from a temple at Khajuraho

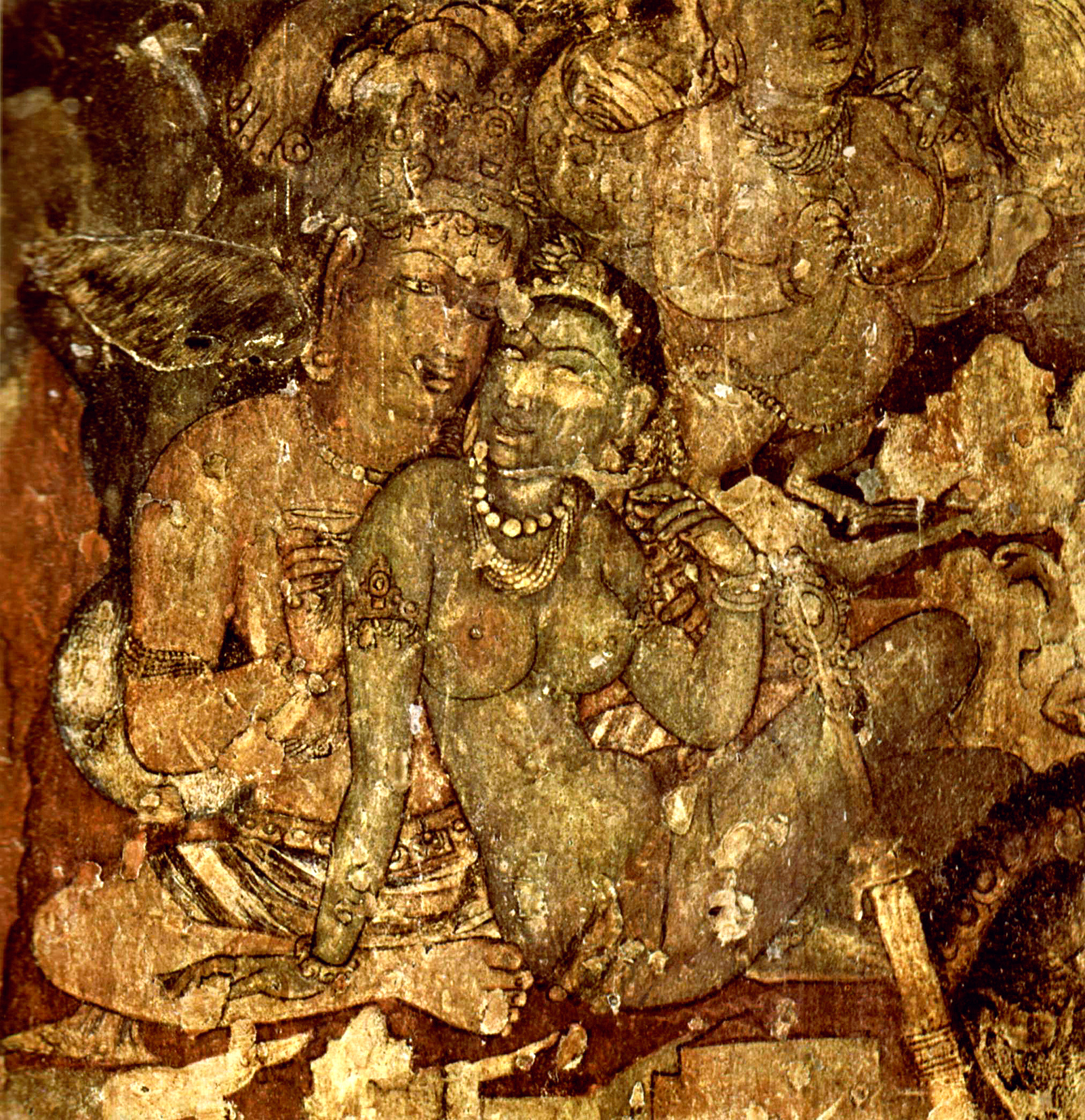
Art from the Ajanta Caves

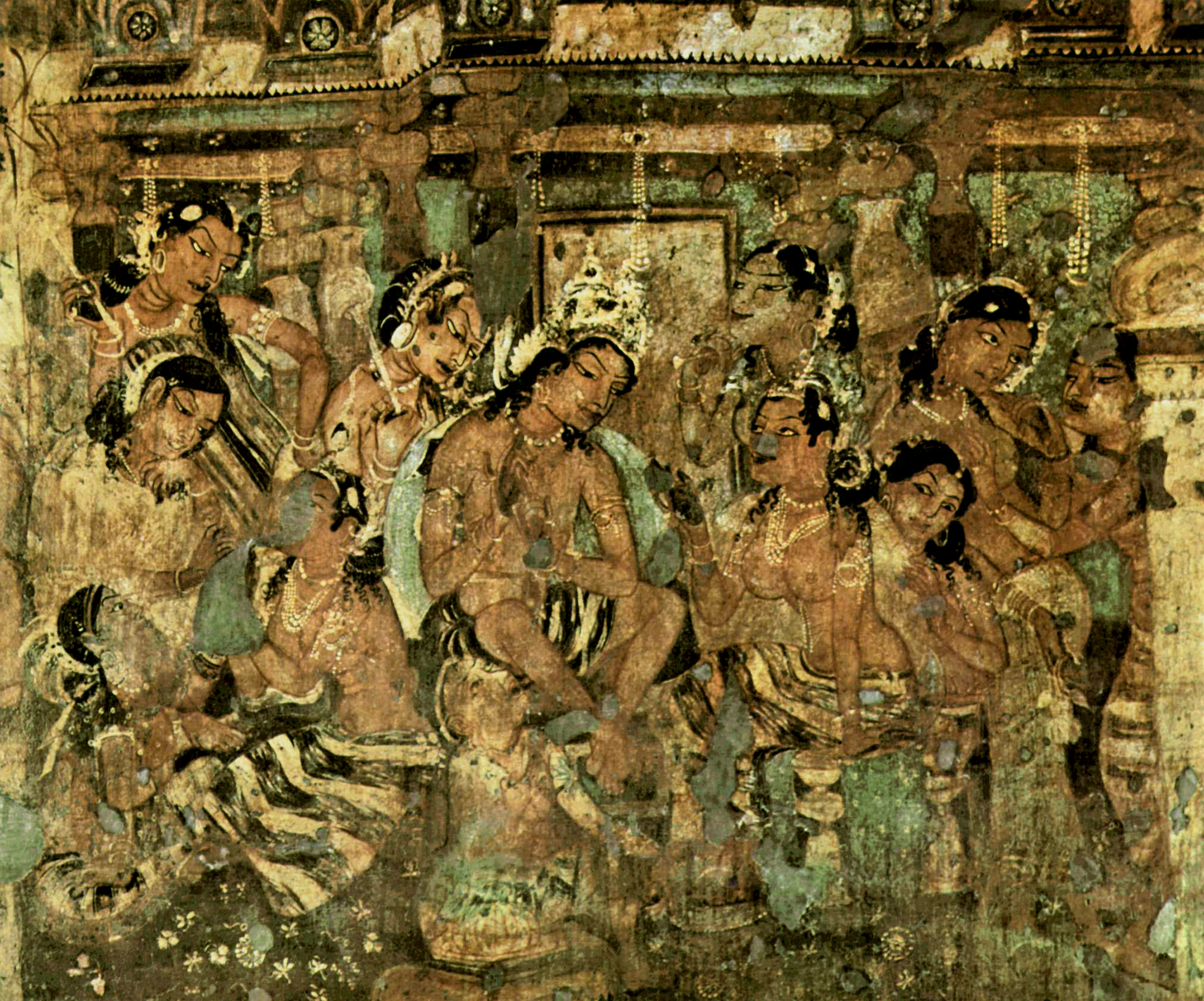
Fresco murals from the Ajanta caves

=== China ===
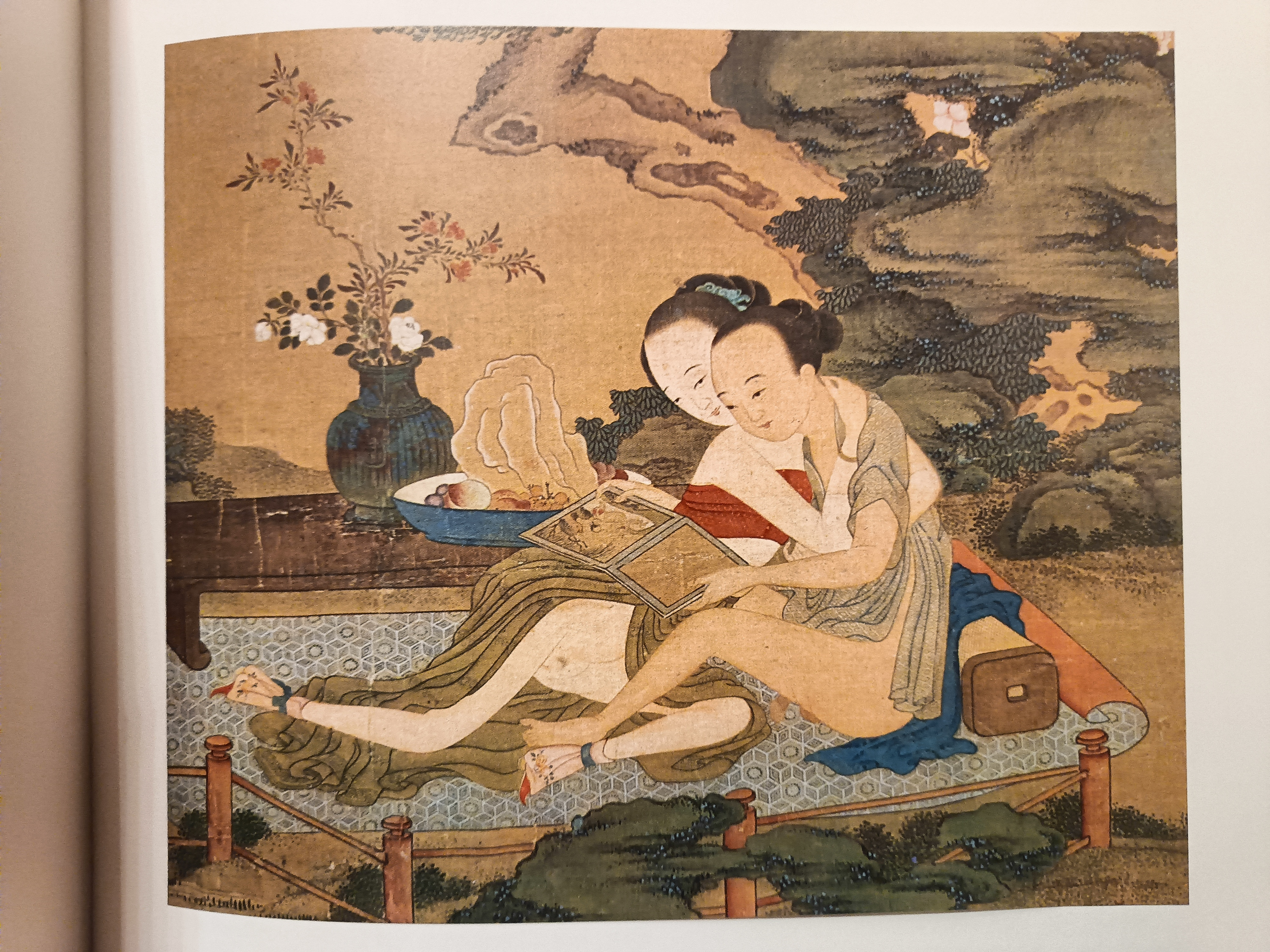
Paintings of sex on an erotic album being viewed. Painting on silk. Thought to be late 17th century

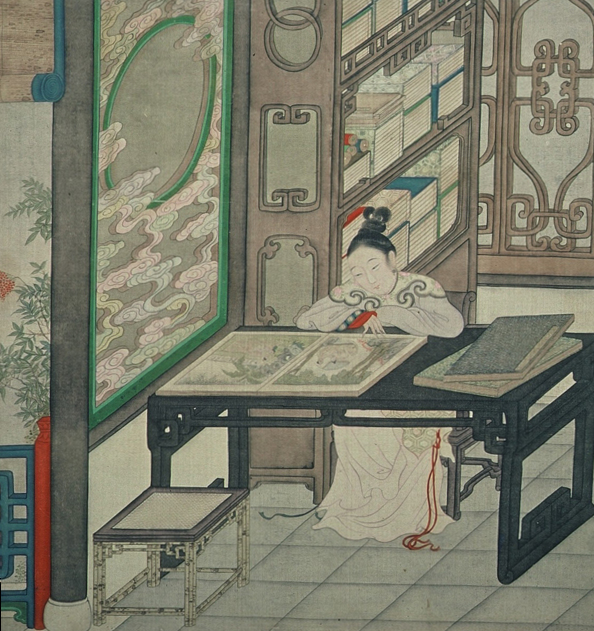
Paintings of sex being viewed in an erotic album, mid to late 18th century

In the I Ching (The Book of Changes, a Chinese classic text dealing with divination) sexual intercourse is one of two fundamental models used to explain the world. With neither embarrassment nor circumlocution, Heaven is described as having sexual intercourse with Earth. Similarly, with no sense of prurient interest, the male lovers of early Chinese men of great political power are mentioned in one of the earliest great works of philosophy and literature, the Zhuang Zi (or Chuang Tzu, as it is written in the old system of romanization).

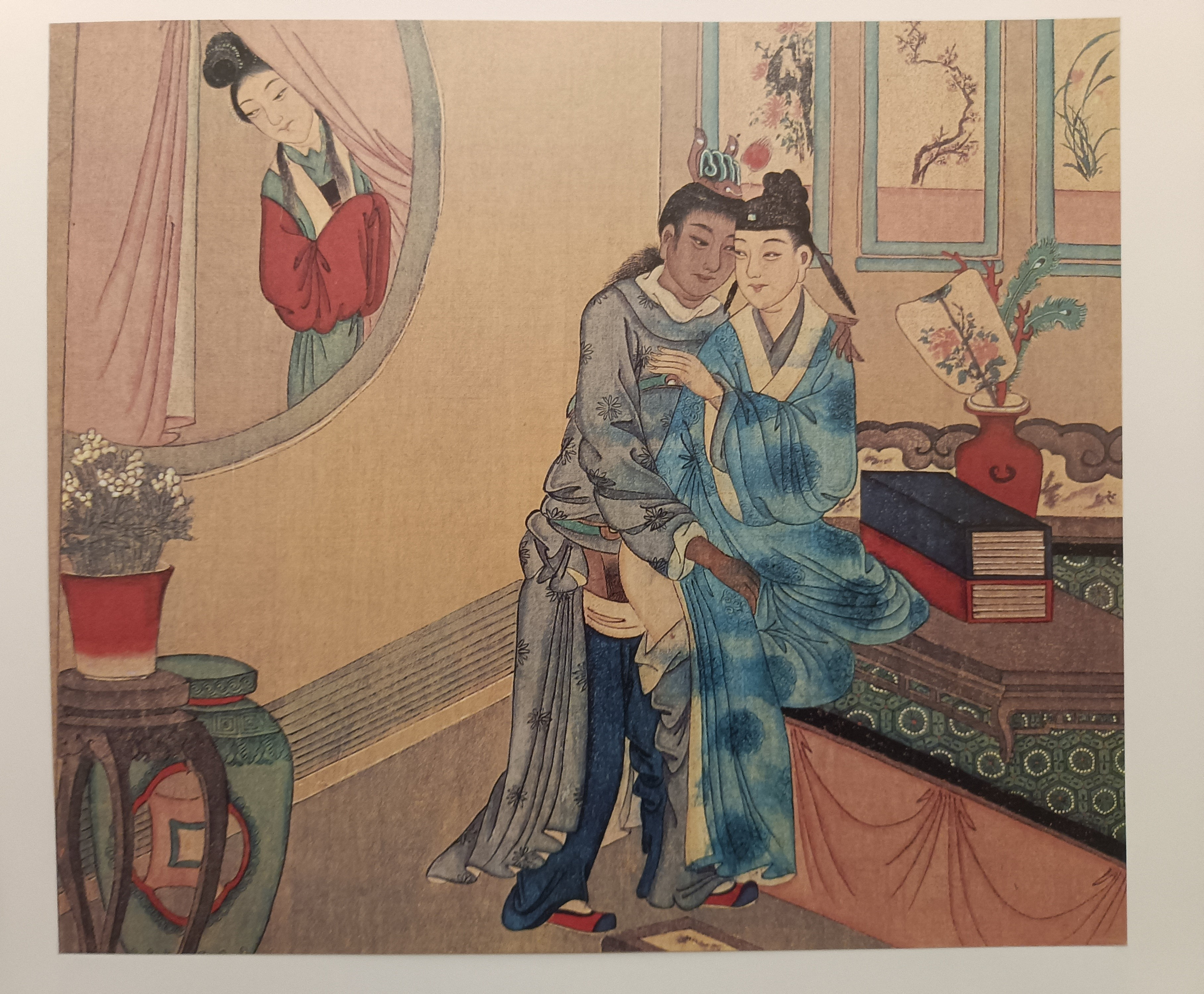
Anal sex between two males being viewed. Painting. Qing Dynasty. 18th Century

From early times, the virginity of women was rigidly enforced by family and community and linked to the monetary value of women as a kind of commodity (the "sale" of women involving the delivery of a bride price). Men were protected in their own sexual adventures by a transparent double standard. While the first wife of a man with any kind of social status in traditional society was almost certainly chosen for him by his father and/or grandfather, the same man might later secure for himself more desirable sexual partners with the status of concubines. In addition, bondservants in his possession could also be sexually available to him. Naturally, not all men had the financial resources to so greatly indulge themselves.

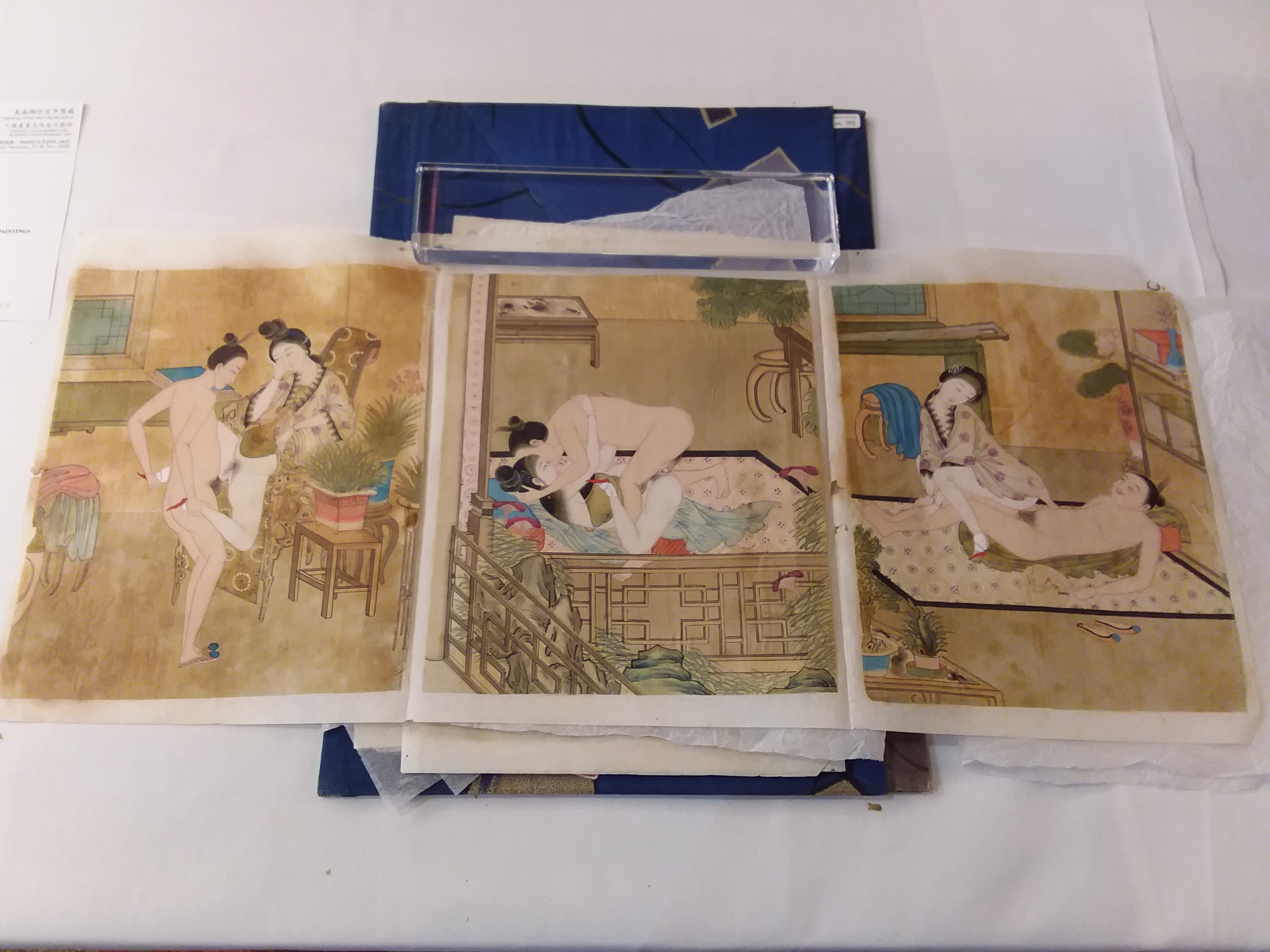
Three leaves from a Chinese erotic album. Around 1701 -1900?

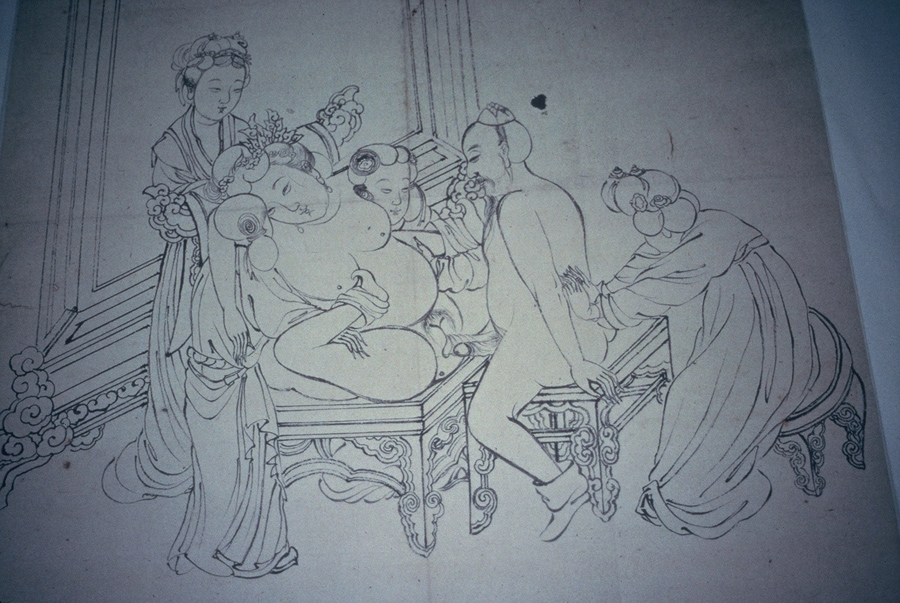
It is thought that this image is a sketch of a painting. The painting is thought to have been created in the pre-Song period prior to 960 CE. This sketch is thought to have been created in the early to mid 19th century.

Chinese literature displays a long history of interest in affection, marital bliss, unabashed sexuality, romance, amorous dalliances, homosexual alliances – in short, all of the aspects of behavior that are affiliated with sexuality in the West. Besides the previously mentioned Zhuang Zi passages, sexuality is exhibited in other works of literature such as the Tang dynasty Yingying zhuan (Biography of Cui Yingying), the Qing dynasty Fu sheng liu ji (Six Chapters of a Floating Life), the humorous and intentionally salacious Jin Ping Mei, and the multi-faceted and insightful Hong lou meng (Dream of the Red Chamber, also called Story of the Stone). Of the above, only the story of Yingying and her de facto husband Zhang fail to describe homosexual as well as heterosexual interactions. The novel entitled Rou bu tuan (Prayer mat of flesh) even describes cross-species organ transplants for the sake of enhanced sexual performance. Among Chinese literature are the Taoist classical texts.

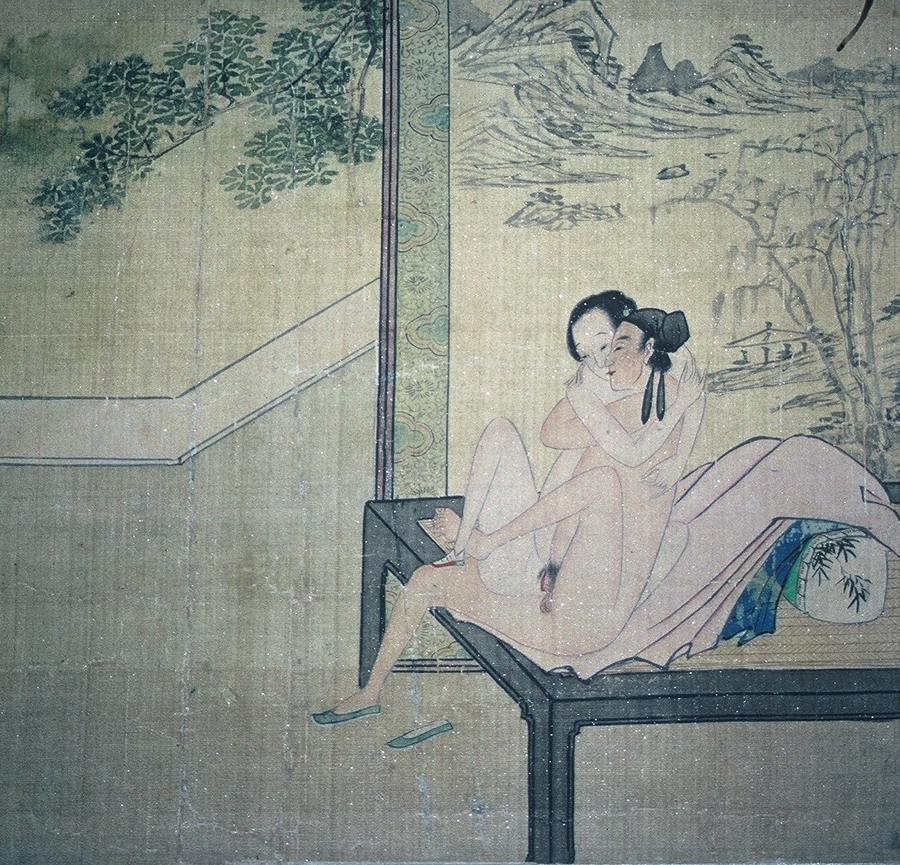
Painting. Wang Sheng. Prior to 1645

=== Japan ===
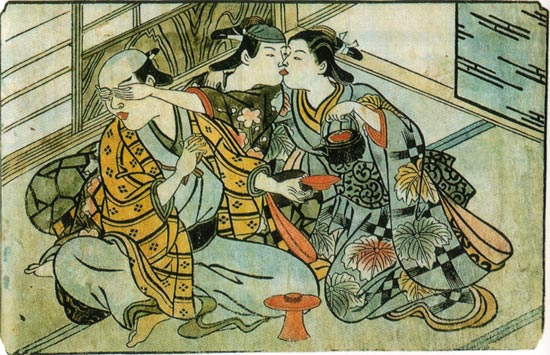
A kabuki actor moonlighting as a sex worker, toys with his client; enjoying the favors of the serving girl. Nishikawa Sukenobu, Shunga-style woodblock print, ink on paper; Kyoho era (1716–1735)

In what is often called the world's first novel, the Genji Monogatari (Tale of Genji), which dates back to around the eighth century AD, eroticism is treated as a central part of the aesthetic life of the nobility. The sexual interactions of Prince Genji are described in great detail, in an objective tone of voice, and in a way that indicates that sexuality was as much a valued component of cultured life as music or any of the arts. While most of his erotic interactions involve women, there is one telling episode in which Genji travels a fairly long distance to visit one of the women with whom he occasionally consorts but finds her away from home. It being late, and intercourse already being on the menu of the day, Genji takes pleasure in the availability of the lady's younger brother who, he reports, is equally satisfactory as an erotic partner.

From that time on to at least as late as the Meiji Reformation, there is no indication that sexuality was treated in a pejorative way. In modern times homosexuality was driven out of sight until it reemerged in the wake of the sexual revolution with seemingly little if any need for a period of acceleration. Yukio Mishima, probably the best-known Japanese writer in the outside world, frequently wrote about homosexuality, and its relationship with Japanese culture new and old. Likewise, prostitution, pornography, the tradition of the Geisha, and countless types of fetish and sadomasochism have resurfaced after decades underground.

In Japan, sexuality was governed by the same social forces that make its culture considerably different from that of China, Korea, India, or Europe. In Japanese society, the primary method used to secure social control is the threat of ostracism. More attention is paid to what is polite or appropriate to show others than to which behaviors might make a person seem "corrupt" or "guilty", in the Christian sense of the words. The tendency of people in Japanese society to group in terms of "in groups" and "out groups"–residue of its long history as a caste society–is a source of great pressure on every facet of society, via pop culture (reflected in the tribal, often materialistic, and very complex nature of teenage subcultures) as well as more traditional standards (as in the high-pressure role of the salaryman). Sexual expression ranges from a requirement to a complete taboo, and many, especially teenagers, find themselves playing many otherwise strictly-separate roles during the week.

A frequent locus of misconceptions in regard to Japanese sexuality is the institution of the geisha. Rather than being a prostitute, a geisha was a woman trained in arts such as music and cultured conversation, and who was available for non-sexual interactions with her male clientele. These women differed from the wives that their patrons probably had at home because, except for the geisha, women were ordinarily not expected to be prepared for anything other than the fulfillment of household duties. This limitation imposed by the normal social role of the majority of women in traditional society produced a diminution in the pursuits that those women could enjoy, but also a limitation in the ways that a man could enjoy the company of his wife. The geisha fulfilled the non-sexual social roles that ordinary women were prevented from fulfilling, and for this service they were well paid. The geisha were not deprived of opportunities to express themselves sexually and in other erotic ways. A geisha might have a patron with whom she enjoyed sexual intimacy, but this sexual role was not part of her role or responsibility as a geisha.

As a superficial level, in traditional Japanese society women were expected to be highly subservient to men and especially to their husbands. So, in a socionormal description of their roles, they were little more than housekeepers and faithful sexual partners to their husbands. Their husbands, on the other hand, might consort sexually with whomever they chose outside of the family, and a major part of male social behavior involves after-work forays to places of entertainment in the company of male cohorts from the workplace—places that might easily offer possibilities of sexual satisfaction outside the family. In the postwar period this side of Japanese society has seen some liberalization in regard to the norms imposed on women as well as an expansion of the de facto powers of women in the family and in the community that existed unacknowledged in traditional society.

In the years since people first became aware of the AIDS epidemic, Japan has not suffered the high rates of disease and death that characterize, for example, some nations in Africa, some nations in Southeast Asia, etc. In 1992, the government of Japan justified its continued refusal to allow oral contraceptives to be distributed in Japan on the fear that it would lead to reduced condom use, and thus increase transmission of AIDS. As of 2004, condoms accounted for 80% of birth control use in Japan, and this may explain Japan's comparably lower rates of AIDS.

=== Ancient Greece ===
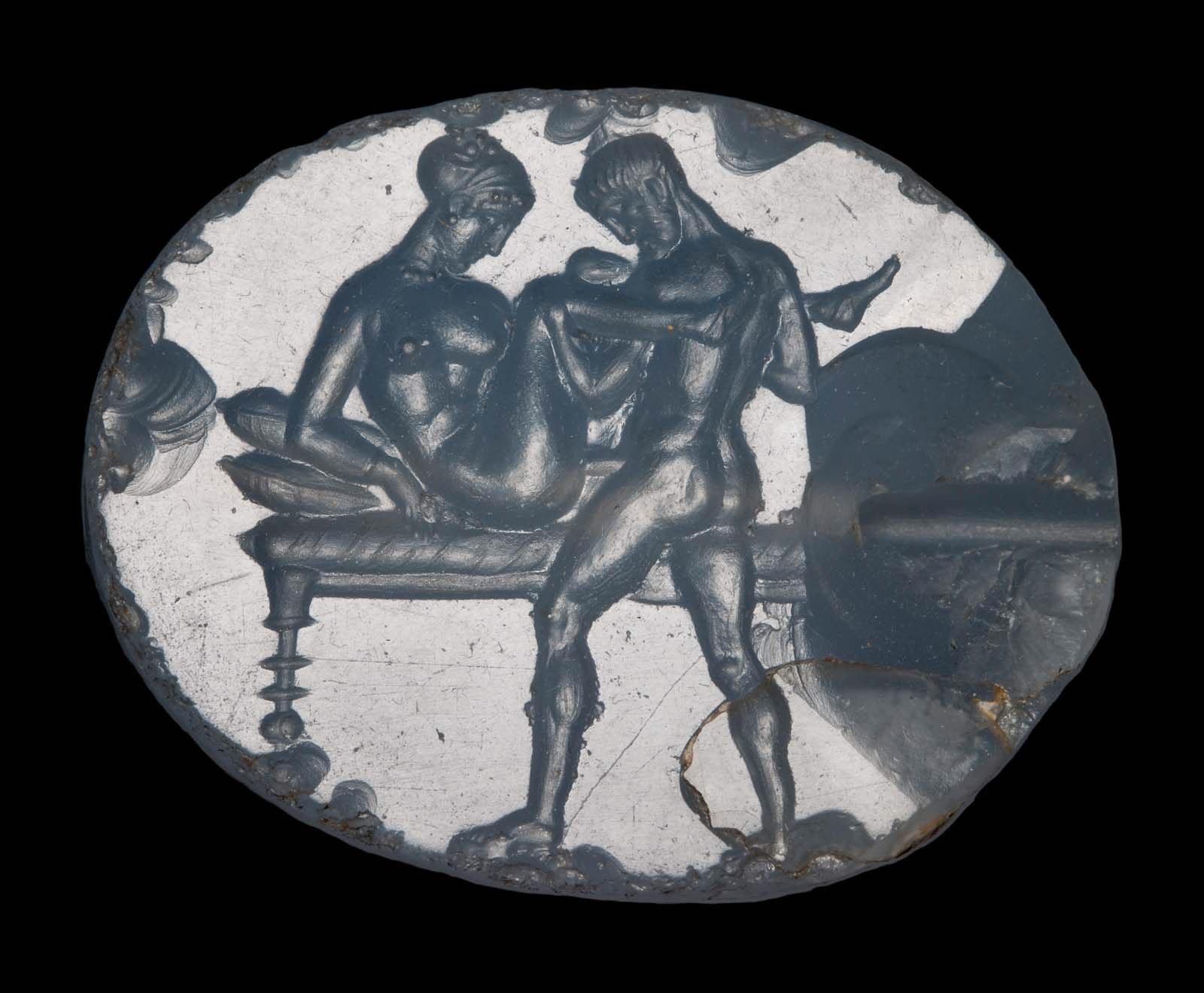
Engraving of an erotic scene on an ancient Greek gem. Late 5th to early 4th century BCE

In ancient Greece, the phallus, often in the form of a herma, was an object of worship as a symbol of fertility. This finds expression in Greek sculpture and other artworks. One ancient Greek male idea of female sexuality was that women envied penises of males. Wives were considered a commodity and instruments for bearing legitimate children. They had to compete sexually with eromenoi, hetaeras and slaves in their own homes.

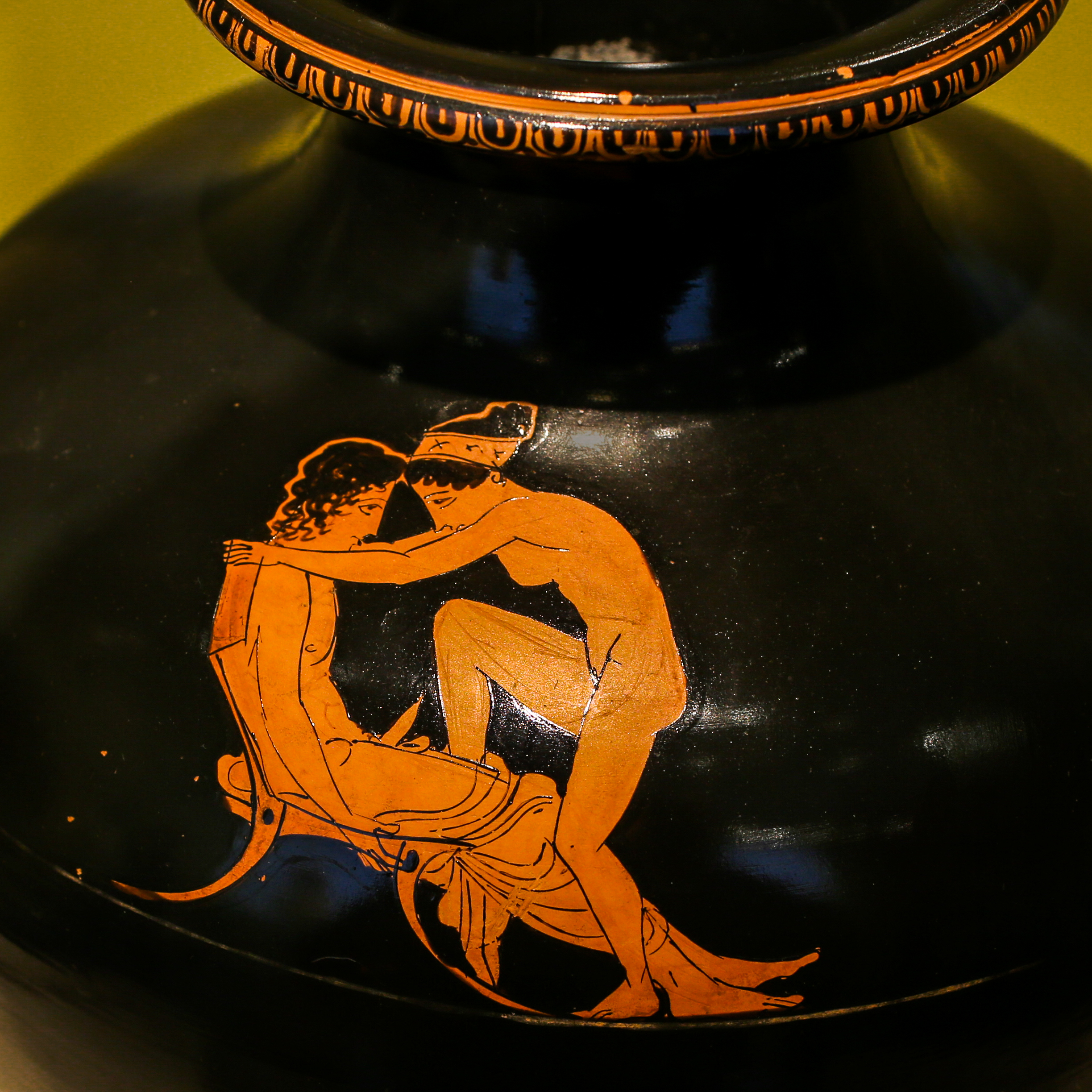
Oinochoe. The Shuvalov Painter. Around 430–420 BCE

Both homosexuality and bisexuality, in the form of ephebophilia (in some ways slavery), were social institutions in ancient Greece, and were integral to education, art, religion, and politics. Same-sex relationships between adults were not unknown but they were disfavored. Lesbian relations were also of a pederastic nature.

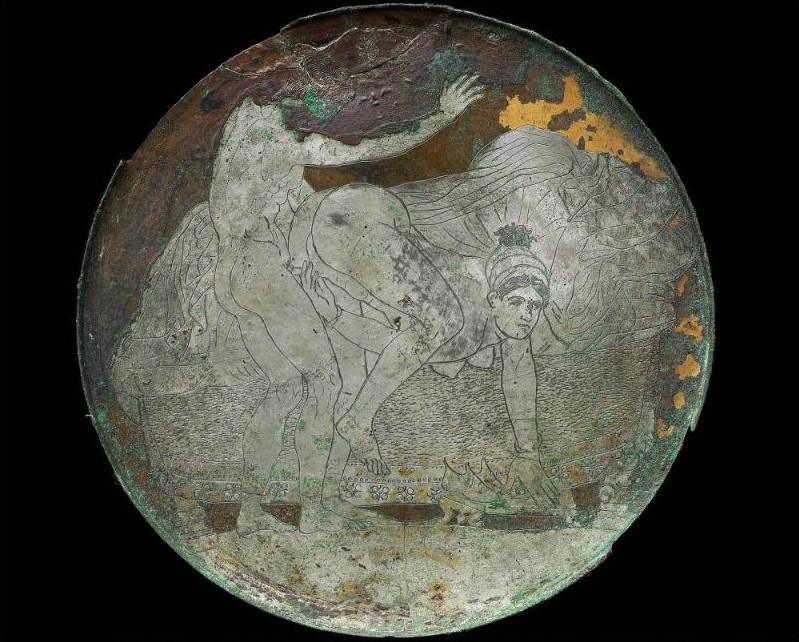
Inner casing of box mirror container with an engraving on a silvered surface. Ancient Greek. Museum of Fine Arts, Boston. Around 340 - 320 BCE

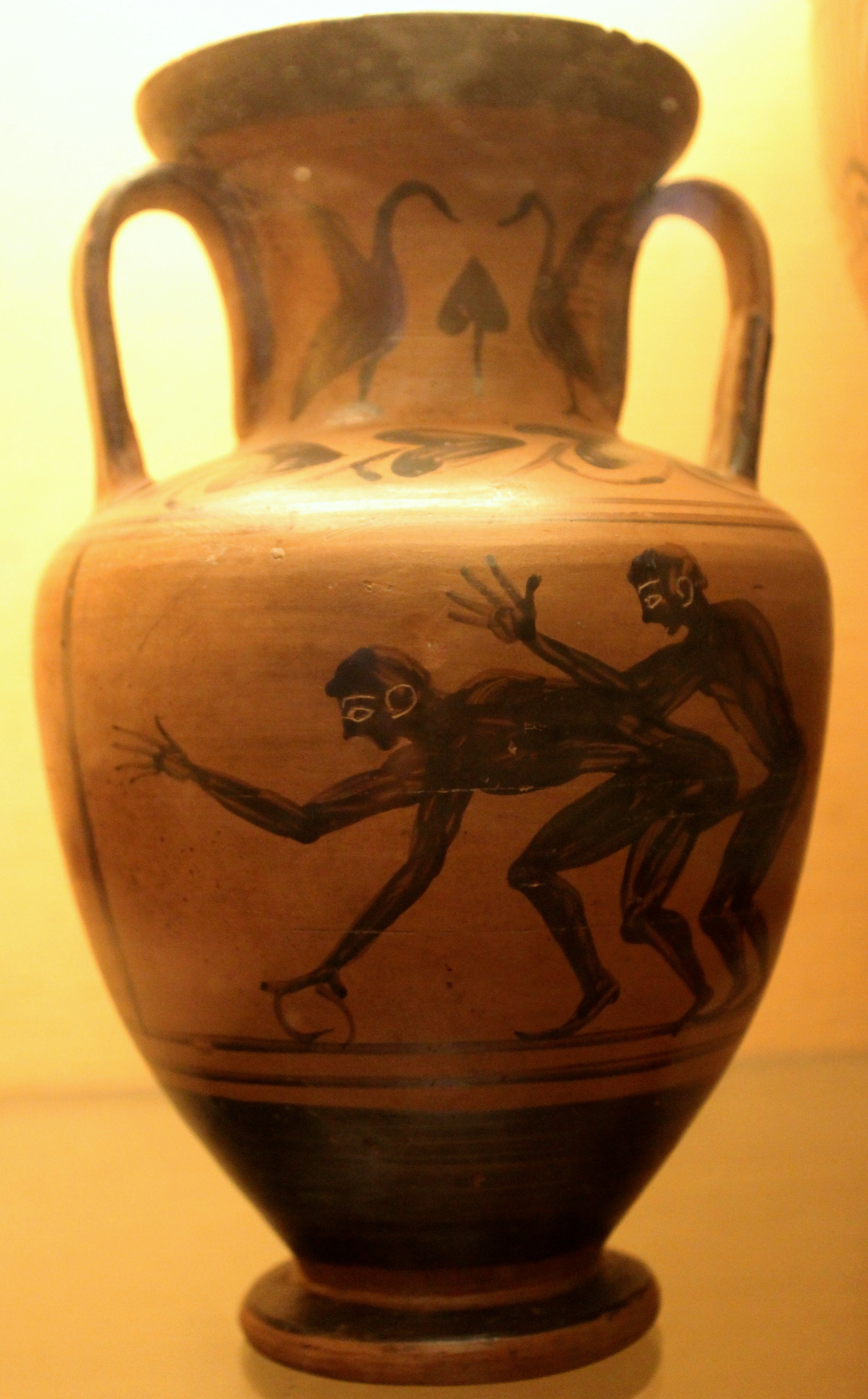
Anal sex between two males. The figure on the left is playing with a hoop. Amphora. Etruscan. 5th century BCE

Rape—usually in the context of warfare—was common and was seen by men as a "right of domination". Rape in the sense of "abduction" followed by consensual lovemaking was represented even in religion: Zeus was said to have ravished many women: Leda in the form of a swan, Danaë disguised as a golden rain, Alkmene disguised as her own husband. Zeus also raped a boy, Ganymede, a myth that paralleled Cretan custom.

=== Etruria ===
The ancient Etruscans had very different views on sexuality, when compared with the other European ancient peoples, most of whom had inherited the Indo-European traditions and views on the gender roles. Greek writers, such as Theopompus and Plato named the Etruscan 'immoral' and from their descriptions we find out that the women commonly had sex with men who were not their husbands and that in their society, children were not labelled "illegitimate" just because they did not know who the father was. Theopompus described orgiastic rituals, but it is not clear whether they were a common custom or only a minor ritual dedicated to a certain deity.

=== Ancient Rome ===
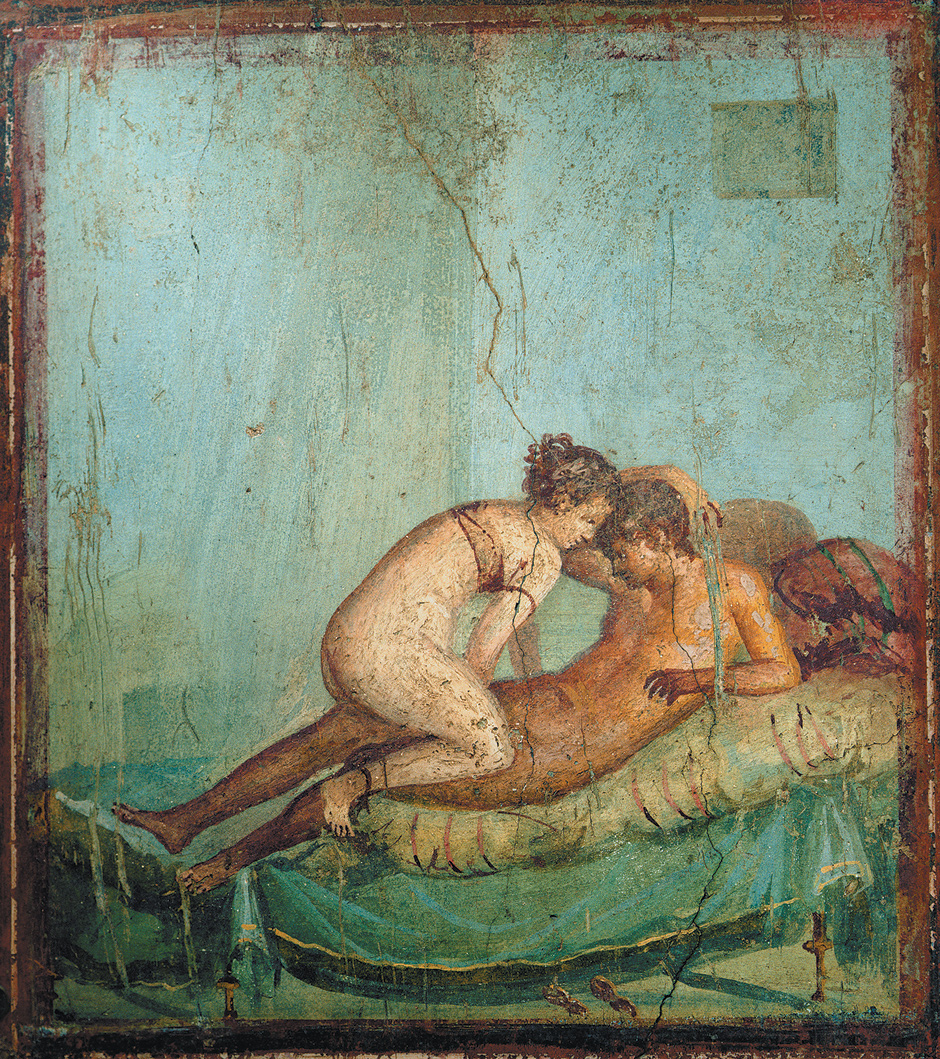
An erotic scene between a male and a female. Wall painting, Pompeii, 1st century.

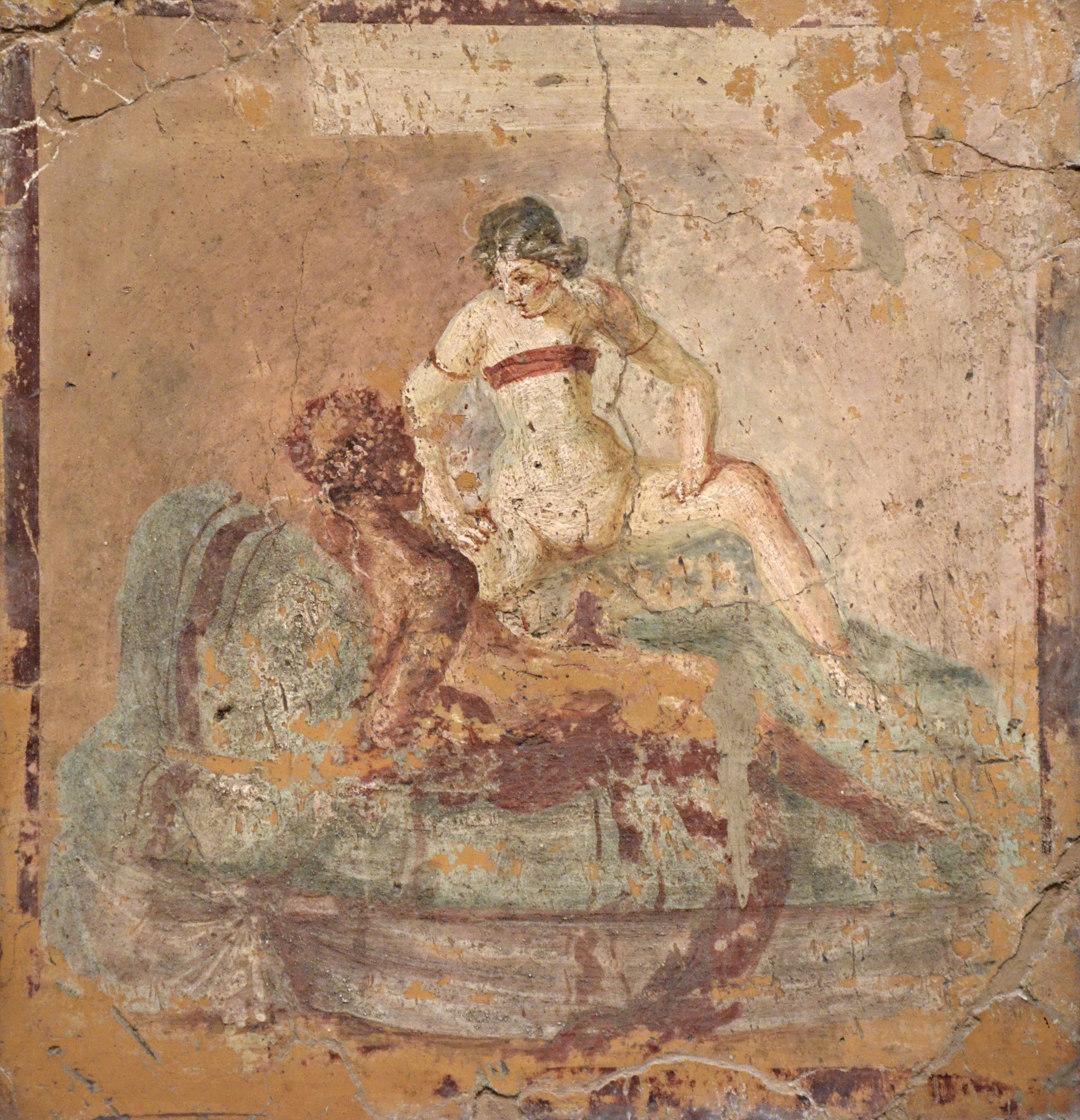
Wall painting from Pompeii depicting the "woman riding" position, a favorite in Roman art: even in explicit sex scenes, the woman's breasts are often covered.

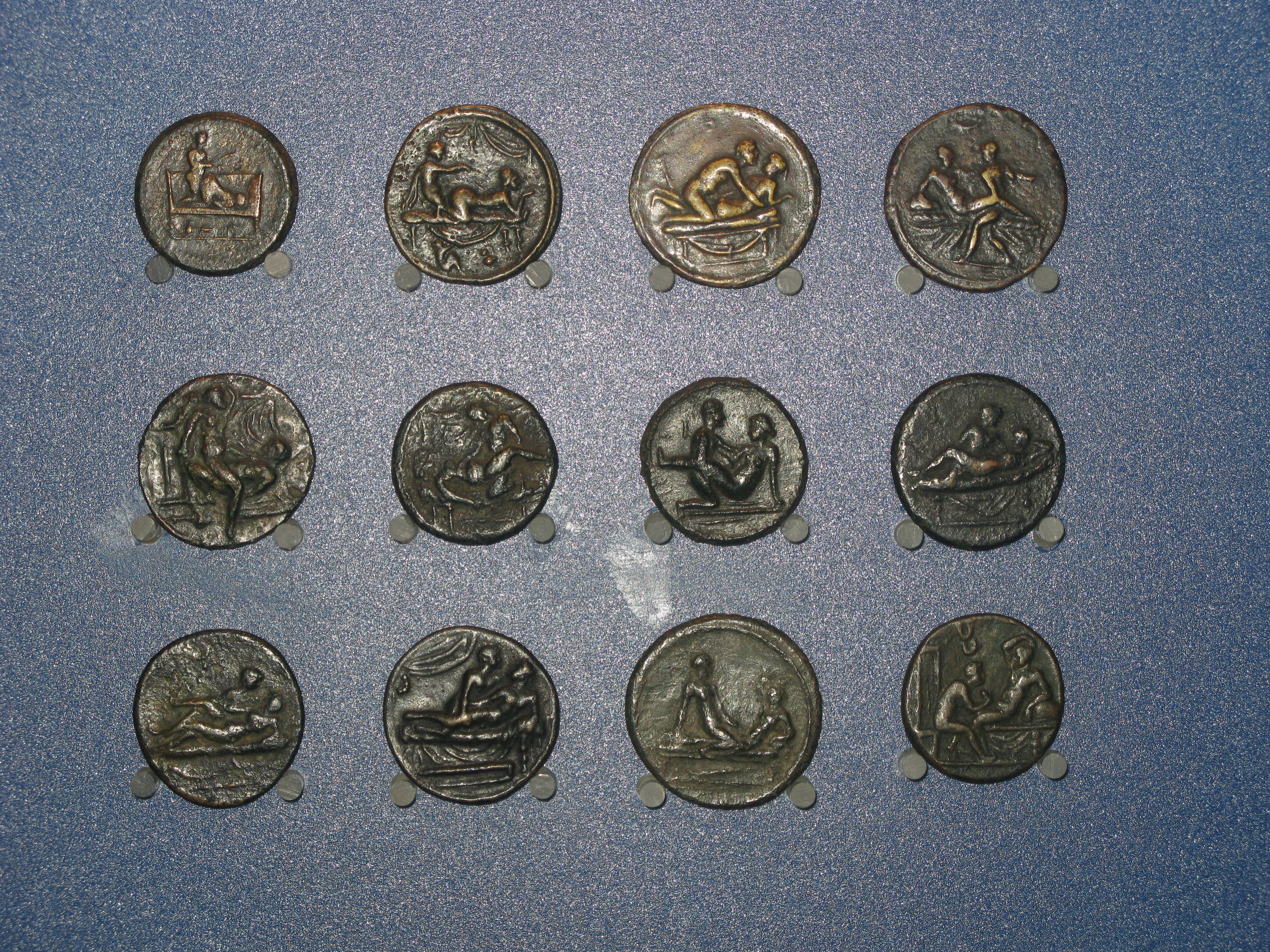
Erotic scenes on Roman Spintria tokens. Hunterian Museum and Art Gallery, Glasgow. Around 22 - 37 CE

In the Roman Republic, the citizen's duty to control his body was central to the concept of male sexuality. "Virtue" (virtus, from vir, "man") was equated with "manliness". The equivalent virtue for female citizens of good social standing was pudicitia, a form of sexual integrity that displayed their attractiveness and self-control. Female sexuality was encouraged within marriage. In Roman patriarchal society, a "real man" was supposed to govern both himself and others well, and should not submit to the use or pleasure of others. Same-sex behaviors were not perceived as diminishing a Roman's masculinity, as long as he played the penetrative or dominating role. Acceptable male partners were social inferiors such as prostitutes, entertainers, and slaves. Sex with freeborn male minors was formally prohibited (see Lex Scantinia). "Homosexual" and "heterosexual" thus did not form the primary dichotomy of Roman thinking about sexuality, and no Latin words for these concepts exist.

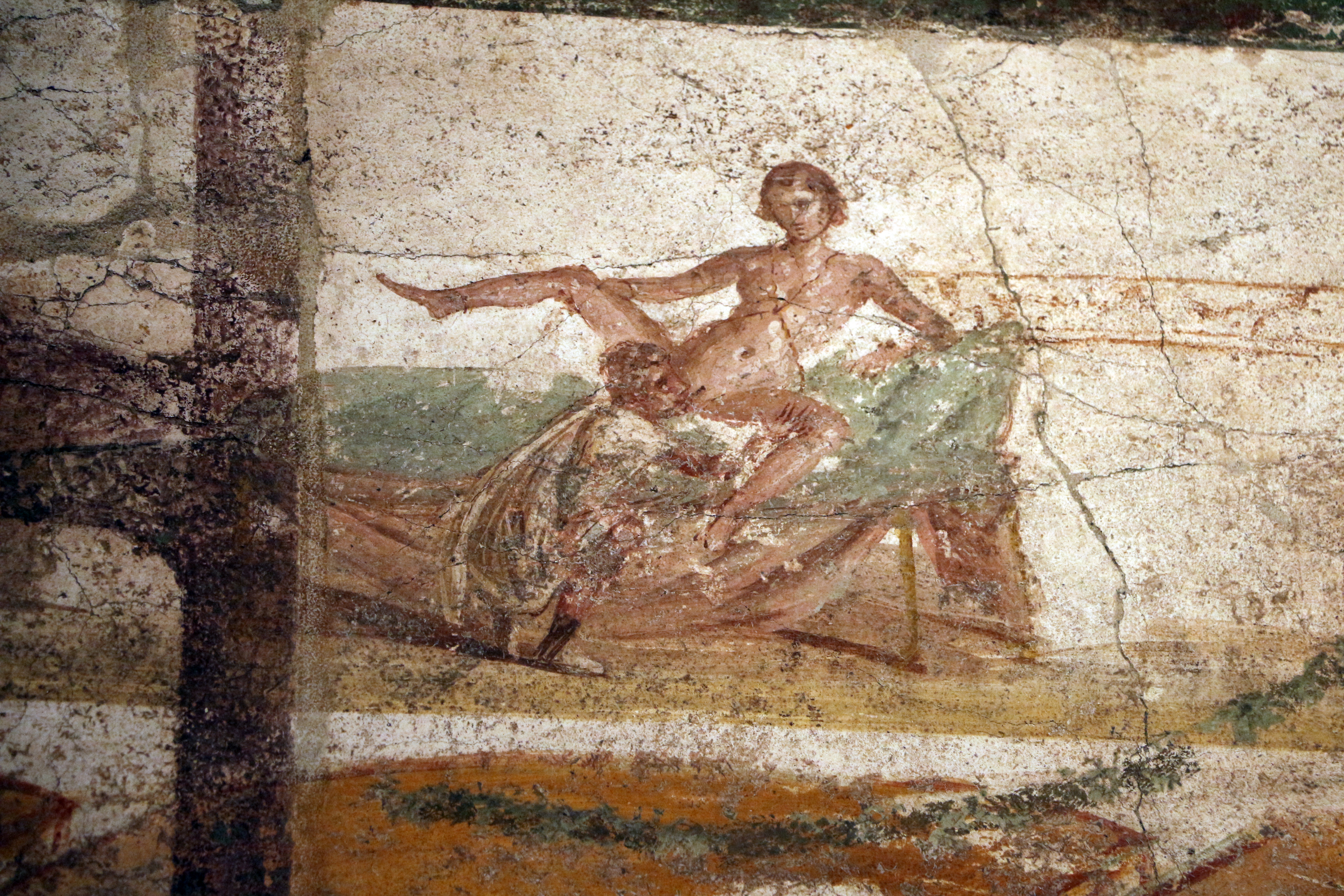
Cunnilingus. Wall painting. Suburban baths, Pompeii. 62 to 79 CE

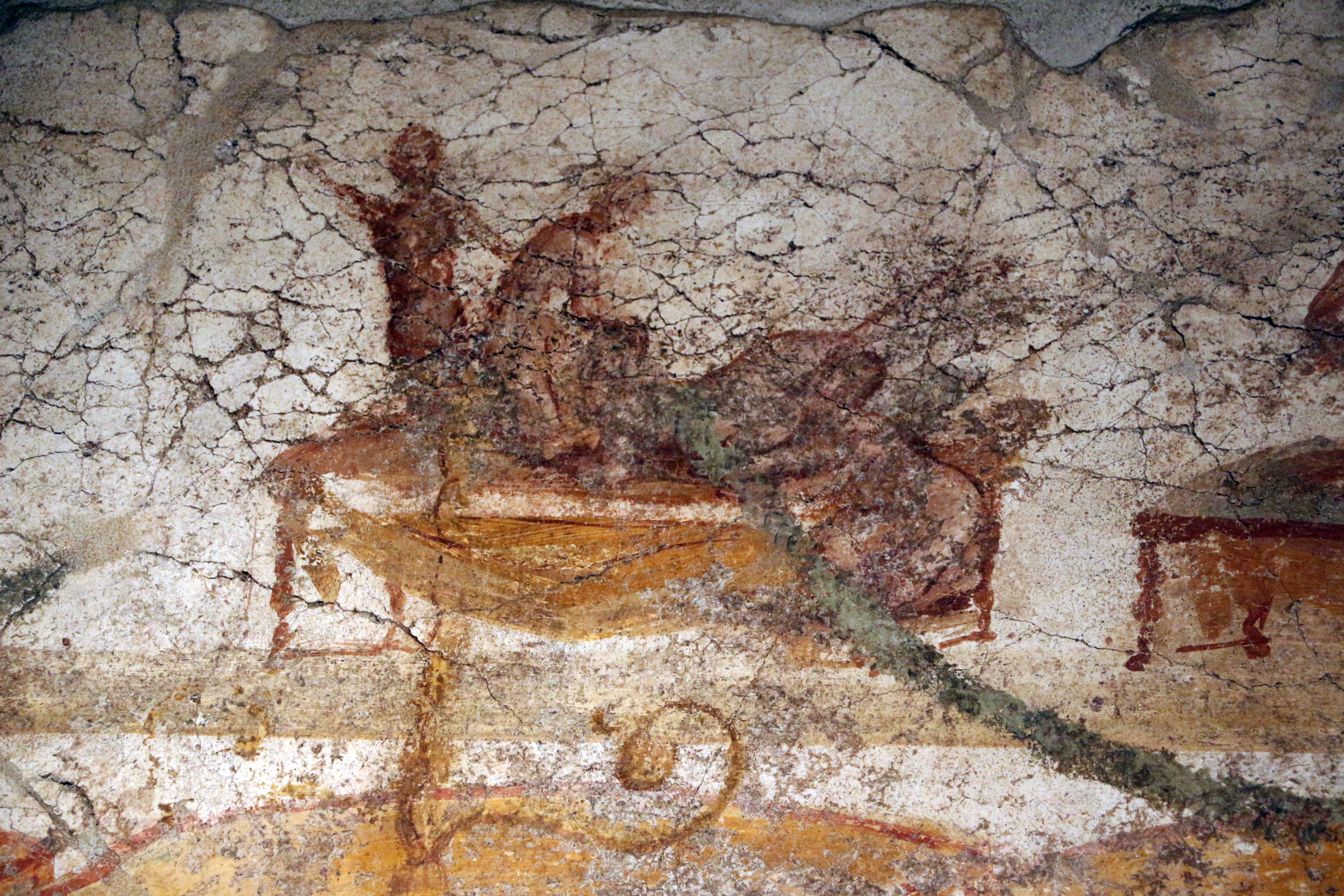
Cunnilingus, fellatio and anal sex between two females and two males. Wall painting, Suburban baths. Pompeii. 62 to 79 CE

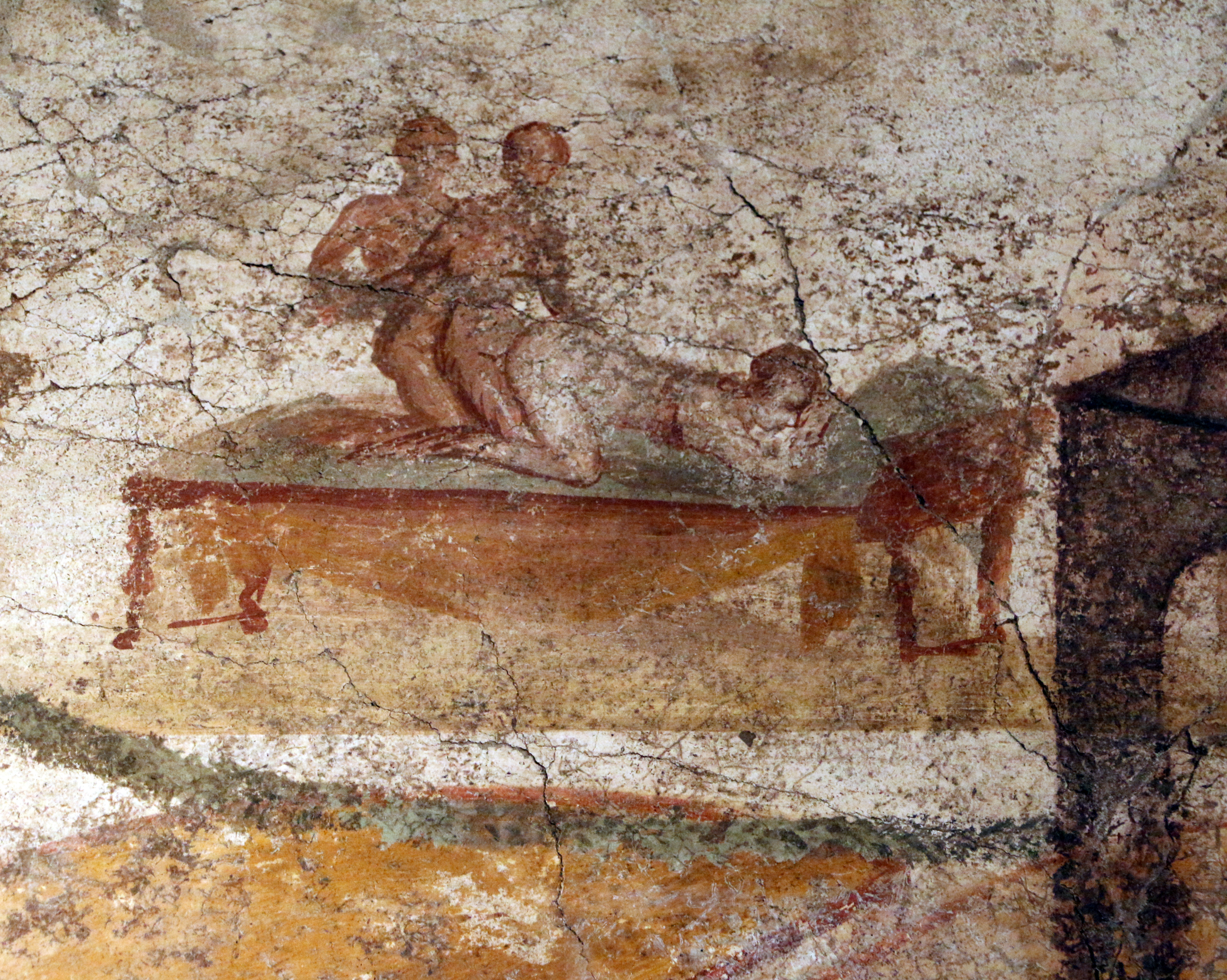
Sex between a female and two males. Wall painting. Suburban baths, Pompeii. 62 to 79 CE

Depictions of frank sexuality are abundant in Roman literature and art. The fascinum, a phallic charm, was a ubiquitous decoration. Sexual positions and scenarios are depicted in great variety among the wall paintings preserved at Pompeii and Herculaneum. Collections of poetry celebrated love affairs, and The Art of Love by the Augustan poet Ovid playfully instructed both men and women in how to attract and enjoy lovers. Elaborate theories of human sexuality based on Greek philosophy were developed by thinkers such as Lucretius and Seneca. Classical myths often deal with sexual themes such as gender identity, adultery, incest, and rape.

Like other aspects of Roman life, sexuality was supported and regulated by traditional Roman religion, both the public cult of the state and private religious practices and magic. Cicero held that the desire to procreate (libido) was "the seedbed of the republic", as it was the cause for the first form of social institution, marriage, which in turn created the family, regarded by the Romans as the building block of civilization.

Roman law penalized sex crimes (stuprum), particularly rape, as well as adultery. A Roman husband, however, committed the crime of adultery only when his sexual partner was a married woman. Prostitution was legal, public, and widespread. Entertainers of any gender were assumed to be sexually available (see infamia), and gladiators were sexually glamorous. The dissolution of Republican ideals of physical integrity in relation to political liberty has been hypothesized to contribute to and reflect the sexual license and decadence associated with the Roman Empire. Anxieties about the loss of liberty and the subordination of the citizen to the emperor were expressed by a perceived increase in passive homosexual behavior among free men. Sexual conquest was a frequent metaphor for Roman imperialism.

=== French Polynesia ===
The Islands have been noted for their sexual culture. Many sexual activities seen as taboo in western cultures were viewed as appropriate by the native culture. Contact with Western societies has changed many of these customs, so research into their pre-Western social history has to be done by reading antique writings.

Children slept in the same room as their parents and were able to witness their parents while they had sex. Intercourse simulation became real penetration as soon as boys were physically able. Adults found simulation of sex by children to be funny. As children approached 11, attitudes toward girls shifted. Premarital sex was not encouraged but was allowed in general, restrictions on adolescent sexuality were incest, exogamy regulations, and firstborn daughters of high-ranking lineage. After their firstborn child, high-ranking women were permitted extramarital affairs.

The next day, as soon as it was light, we were surrounded by a still greater multitude of these people. There were now a hundred females at least; and they practised all the arts of lewd expression and gesture, to gain admission on board. It was with difficulty I could get my crew to obey the orders I had given on this subject. Amongst these females were some not more than ten years of age. But youth, it seems, is here no test of innocence; these infants, as I may call them, rivalled their mothers in the wantonness of their motions and the arts of allurement.

— Yuri Lisyansky in his memoirs

Adam Johann von Krusenstern, in his book about the same expedition as Yuri's, reports that a father brought a 10–12-year-old girl on his ship, and she had sex with the crew. According to the book by Étienne Marchand, eight-year-old girls had sex and performed other sexual acts in public.

=== 20th century: sexual revolution ===
The second sexual revolution was a substantial change in sexual morality and sexual behaviour throughout the West in the 1960s and early 1970s. One factor in the change of values pertaining to sexual activities was the invention of new, efficient technologies for the personal control of ability to enter pregnancy. Prime among them, at that time, was the first birth control pill. Liberalized laws on abortion in many countries likewise made it possible to safely and legally break off an unwanted pregnancy without having to invoke a birth posing grave danger to the health of the mother.

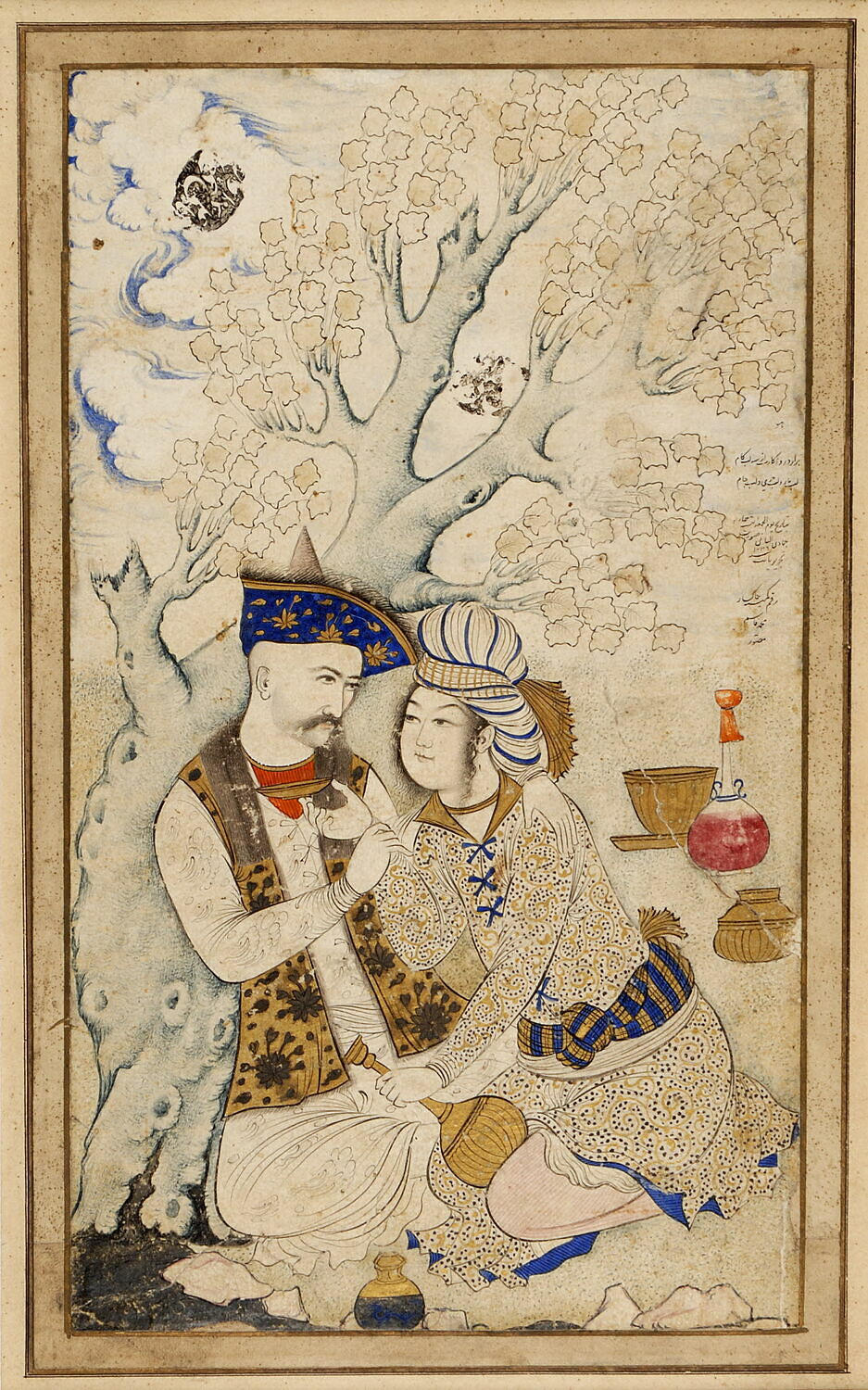
Abbas the Great embracing a wine boy. Painting by Muhammad Qasim, 1627. Louvre, Paris.

== Same-sex relations ==
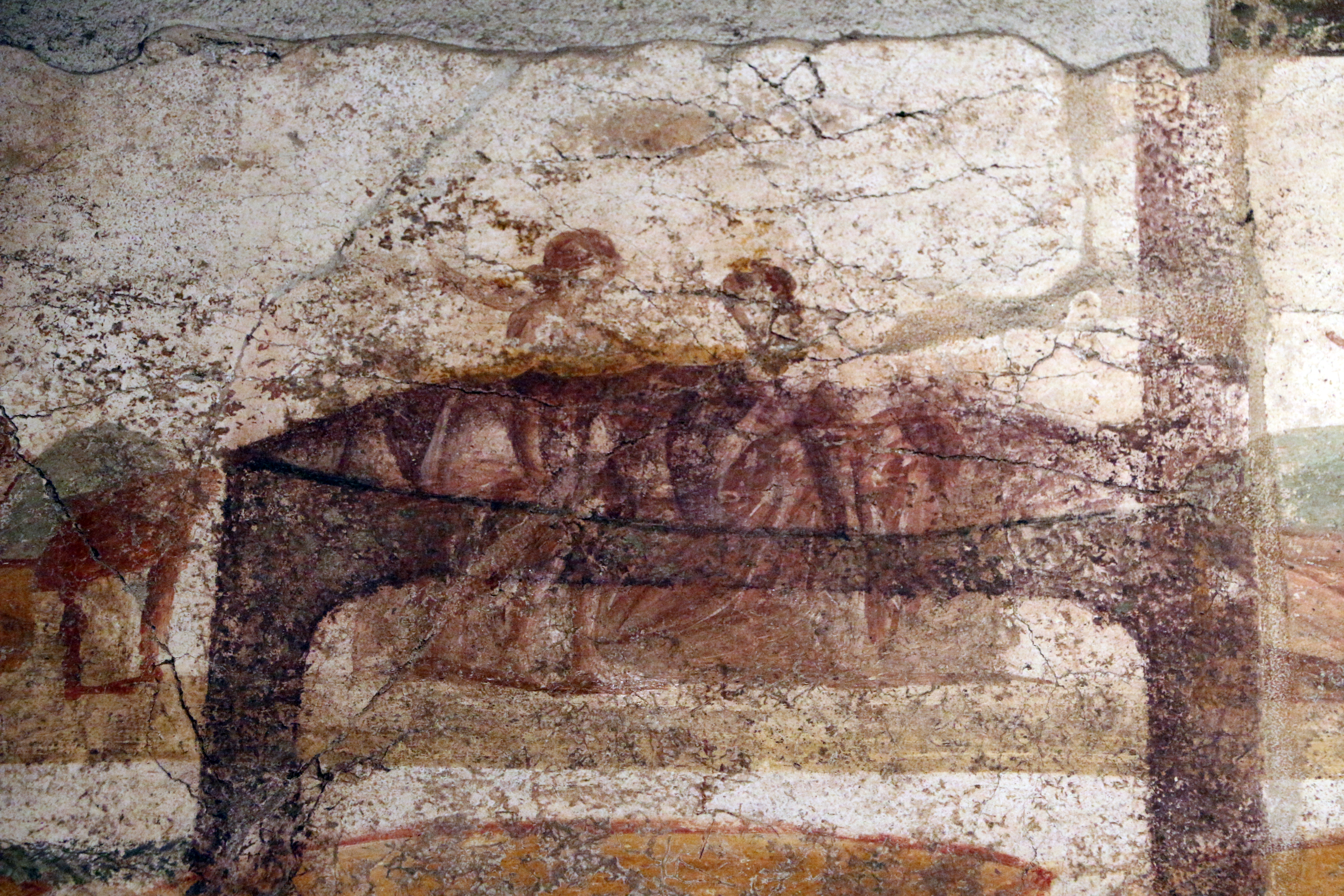
Lesbian sex scene. Wall painting. Suburban baths, Pompeii. 62 to 79 CE

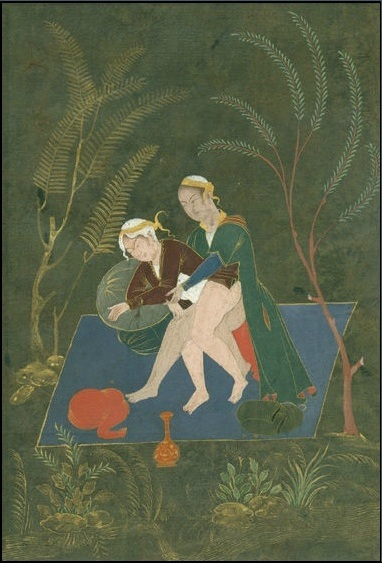
Anal sex between two males. Watercolour on paper (1880–1926)

Societal attitudes towards same-sex relationships have varied over time and place, from requiring all males to engage in same-sex relationships, to casual integration, through acceptance, to seeing the practice as a minor sin, repressing it through law enforcement and judicial mechanisms, and to proscribing it under penalty of death. In a detailed compilation of historical and ethnographic materials of pre-industrial cultures, "strong disapproval of homosexuality was reported for 41% of 42 cultures; it was accepted or ignored by 21%, and 12% reported no such concept. Of 70 ethnographies, 59% reported homosexuality absent or rare in frequency and 41% reported it present or not uncommon."

In cultures influenced by Abrahamic religions, the law and the church established sodomy as a transgression against divine law or a crime against nature. The condemnation of anal sex between males, however, predates Christian belief. It was frequent in ancient Greece; "unnatural" can be traced back to Plato.

Many historical figures, including Socrates, Lord Byron, Edward II, and Hadrian, have had terms such as gay or bisexual applied to them; some scholars, such as Michel Foucault, have regarded this as risking the anachronistic introduction of a contemporary construction of sexuality foreign to their times, though others challenge this.

A common thread of constructionist argument is that no one in antiquity or the Middle Ages experienced homosexuality as an exclusive, permanent, or defining mode of sexuality. John Boswell has countered this argument by citing ancient Greek writings by Plato, which describe individuals exhibiting exclusive homosexuality.

== Religion and sex ==
=== Abrahamic religions ===
Abrahamic religions (namely Judaism, Samaritanism, Christianity, the Baháʼí Faith, and Islam) have traditionally affirmed and endorsed a patriarchal and heteronormative approach towards human sexuality, favouring exclusively penetrative vaginal intercourse between men and women within the boundaries of marriage over all other forms of human sexual activity, including autoeroticism, masturbation, oral sex, anal sex, non-penetrative and non-heterosexual sexual intercourse (all of which have been labeled as "sodomy" at various times), believing and teaching that such behaviors are forbidden because they're considered sinful, and further compared to or derived from the behavior of the alleged residents of Sodom and Gomorrah. However, the status of LGBT people in early Christianity and early Islam is debated.

==== Judaism ====
Under Jewish law, sex is not considered intrinsically sinful or shameful when conducted in marriage, nor is it a necessary evil for the purpose of procreation. Sex is considered a private and holy act between a husband and wife. Certain deviant sexual practices, enumerated below, were considered gravely immoral "abominations" sometimes punishable by death. The residue of sex was considered ritually unclean outside the body, and required ablution.

Recently, some scholars have questioned whether the Old Testament banned all forms of homosexuality, raising issues of translation and references to ancient cultural practices. However, rabbinic Judaism had unambiguously condemned homosexuality.

- And God blessed them, and God said to them, "Be fruitful and multiply and fill the earth and subdue it, and rule over the fish of the sea and over the fowl of the sky and over all the beasts that tread upon the earth. (Genesis 1:28)

The Torah, while being quite frank in its description of various sexual acts, forbids certain relationships including adultery, all forms of incest, male homosexuality, and bestiality, and introduced the idea that one should not have sex during the wife's period:

- You shall not lie carnally with your neighbor's wife, to become defiled by her. (Lev. 18:20)
- Thou shalt not lie with mankind, as with womankind: it is abomination. (Lev. 18:22)
- And with no animal shall you cohabit, to become defiled by it. And a woman shall not stand in front of an animal to cohabit with it; this is depravity. (Lev. 18:23)
- And to a woman during the uncleanness of her separation, you shall not come near to uncover her nakedness. (Lev. 18:19)

==== Christianity ====
Christianity re-emphasised the Jewish attitudes on sexuality with two new concepts. First, there was the re-iterated idea that marriage was absolutely exclusive and indissoluble, placing further guidance on divorce and expanding on the reasons and principles behind those laws. Second, in Old Testament times marriage was almost universal, in continuity with the total matrimony in Eden, but in the New Testament, the trajectory is extended forward to the goal of no marriage in the new heavens and new earth (see Matthew 22).

The New Testament is quite clear on principles regarding sexual relations. In one of his letters to the Corinthian church, Paul directly answers some questions they had asked about this.

1 Now concerning the matters about which you wrote: 'It is well for a man not to touch a woman.' 2 But because of cases of sexual immorality, each man should have his own wife and each woman her own husband. 3 The husband should give to his wife her conjugal rights, and likewise the wife to her husband. 4 For the wife does not have authority over her own body, but the husband does; likewise the husband does not have authority over his own body, but the wife does. 5 Do not deprive one another except perhaps by agreement for a set time, to devote yourselves to prayer, and then come together again, so that Satan may not tempt you because of your lack of self-control. 6 This I say by way of concession, not of command. 7 I wish that all were as I myself am. But each has a particular gift from God, one having one kind and another a different kind." (1 Corinthians 7:1-9, NRSV)

Paul is speaking into a situation where the church was falling into lust, and some members even using prostitutes (6:16), while others advocated a 'higher spirituality' that wrongly denied pleasure from earthly things, including abstinence from sex (7:1). Paul writes to them to explain the right context for sex in marriage, and the importance of couples keeping having sex and giving each other pleasure, but encourages them to pursue celibacy (as he later explains [7:32-35], so that they may devote more time and energy to others) wherever God has granted that gift (7:7).

Many other passages refer to sex or marriage. Augustine of Hippo opined that before Adam's fall, there was no lust in the sexual act, but that it was entirely subordinate to human reason. Later theologians similarly concluded that the lust involved in sexuality was a result of original sin, but nearly all agreed that this was only a venial sin if conducted within marriage without inordinate lust.

In Reformed schools, as represented for example by the Westminster Confession, three purposes of marriage are drawn out: for mutual encouragement, support, and pleasure; for having children; and to prevent lustful sin.

==== Islam ====
In Islam, sexual intercourse is allowed only after marriage and not considered intrinsically sinful or shameful when conducted in marriage. Certain deviant sexual practices are considered gravely immoral "abominations" sometimes punishable by death. The full body ablution is required before performing prayers subsequent to coitus.

If a Muslim engaged in sexual intercourse with any other than the spouse, then this would be considered sinful, and a crime, and such extra-marital intercourse, referred to as zina in the Qur'an is punishable in few countries that fully practice Islamic law (Sharia) by corporal punishment of 100 lashes if the person is unmarried (fornication) and by death if the person is married to another (adultery). This only if the actual copulation is witnessed by four people who will attest to such, and as per Qur'an text if the accuser cannot bring four witnesses the punishment is 80 lashes for making unsubstantiated accusations. Generally this means the punishments are not carried out unless the culprits themselves confess to the sin on four separate occasions and therefore are liable to be punished for the crime.

=== Indian religions ===
==== Hinduism ====
In India, Hinduism accepted an open attitude towards sex as an art, science and spiritual practice. The most famous pieces of Indian literature on sex are Kamasutra (Aphorisms on Love) and Kamashastra (from Kama = pleasure, shastra = specialised knowledge or technique). This collection of explicit sexual writings, both spiritual and practical, covers most aspects of human courtship and sexual intercourse. It was put together in this form by the sage Vatsyayana from a 150 chapter manuscript that had itself been distilled from 300 chapters that had in turn come from a compilation of some 100,000 chapters of text. The Kamasutra is thought to have been written in its final form sometime between the third and fifth century AD, based on circumstantial evidence.

Apart from Vatsyayana's Kamashastra, which is no doubt the most famous of all such writings, there exist a number of other books, for example:

- The Ratirahasya, literal translation—secrets (rahasya) of love (rati, the union);
- The Panchasakya, or the five (panch) arrows (sakya);
- The Ratimanjari, or the garland (manjari) of love (rati, the union)
- The Ananga Ranga, or the stage of love.

== Technology and sex ==
In the mid 20th century advances in medical science and modern understanding of the menstrual cycle led to observational, surgical, chemical and laboratory techniques to allow diagnosis and the treatment of many forms of infertility. The birth control pill introduced in the 1960s allowed women to control if and when they had children which increased their freedom, both sexually and socially.

The pill was illegal in many countries, including the United States and Canada, as the notion that women could prevent pregnancy with a medication incited fear in many people due to misogynistic views on women and their roles as birth givers. The United States Supreme Court legalized the pill for unmarried people in 1974 with Eisenstadt v. Baird, and it held in 1978 that states cannot place restrictions to access of the pill to individuals.

Digital technology such as the internet, social media and mobile apps have dramatically expanded the possibly for young people to communicate and explore sexuality. Most young people access the internet on a daily basis allowing the opportunity for them to explore sexuality online. Research identifies three main ways young people mediate sexuality with technology: consumption of pornography, engagement in sexting, and use of dating apps.

Research shows that the internet not only allows people to access information it also allows them to share stories, learn from peers and understand their own experiences. Despite concerns, research on the impact of youth's use of technology for sexuality on their health and relationships is limited and ongoing.

== Zoophilia ==
Zoophilia or bestiality—sexual activity between humans and animals—probably dates back to prehistory. Depictions of humans and animals in a sexual context appear infrequently in rock art in Europe beginning around the onset of the Neolithic and the domestication of animals. Bestiality remained a common theme in mythology and folklore through the classical period and into the Middle Ages (e.g. Leda and the Swan) and several ancient authors purported to document it as a regular, accepted practice—albeit usually in "other" cultures.

Explicit legal prohibition of human sexual contact with animals is a legacy of the Abrahamic religions: the Hebrew Bible imposes the death penalty on both the person and animal involved in an act of bestiality. There are several examples known from medieval Europe of people and animals executed for committing bestiality. With the Age of Enlightenment, bestiality was subsumed with other sexual "crimes against nature" into civil sodomy laws, usually remaining a capital crime.

Bestiality remains illegal in most countries. Though religious and "crime against nature" arguments may still be used to justify this, today the central issue is the ability of non-human animals to give consent: it is argued that sex with animals is inherently abusive. In common with many paraphilias, the internet has allowed the formation of a zoophile community that has begun to lobby for zoophilia to be considered an alternative sexuality and for the legalisation of bestiality.

== Prostitution ==
Prostitution is the sale of sexual services, such as oral sex or sexual intercourse. Prostitution has been described as the "world's oldest profession". Gonorrhea infection was recorded at least 700 years ago and associated with a district in Paris formerly known as "Le Clapiers" where prostitutes often worked.

Depending on the time period and geographical location the social class and acceptance of prostitutes varied. In ancient Greece the hetaerae were often women of high social class, whereas in Rome the meretrices were of lower social order. The Devadasi, prostitutes of Hindu temples in south India, were made illegal by the Indian government in 1988.

Male prostitution has a long and varied history dating back to ancient civilizations. In classical antiquity, particularly in Greek & Roman societies, male sex work was both documented and regulated. Texts acknowledge that male prostitution as a common aspect of urban life, often involving slaves or lower class freemen for both Roman & Greek civilizations Roman male prostitutes were known as Scortum.

Limited female-female sexual relations were documented in literary and artistic sources but rarely linked explicitly to organized prostitution. Lesbianism and female homosexuality in antiquity were often stigmatized or ignored in historical records, contributing to the difficulty in identifying cases of female sex work directed toward female clients.

In South Asia, the hijra community, often considered a third gender and include transgender and intersex individuals, have a long history of sex work linked to both ritual and social roles.

In medieval Europe, male homosexual acts were criminalized and often severely punished. Despite this, male prostitution existed, often servicing elite men, soldiers, or travelers.

In the modern era LGBTQ+ sex work has continued and has been documented since the late 19th century. Gay male sex work saw a significant expansion with the urbanization and visibility of LGBTQ+ communities in the 20th century. It often flourished in underground networks due to the criminalization of homosexuality in many countries.

Transgender individuals are disproportionately represented in sex work worldwide, often due to exclusion from formal employment and social discrimination. Brazil has the highest number of transgender people murdered globally, with many transgender women engaging in sex work as a result of pervasive violence and discrimination in the country.

In the Asia-Pacific region, in countries like India, Indonesia, and Malaysia, surveys indicate 80%-90% of transgender populations report involvement in the sex trade. Countries with large transgender populations like the United States and the Philippines also report significant numbers engaged in sex work.

After the Vietnam war, Thailand became internationally known as a sex tourism destination for U.S. military personnel in the 1960s and 1970s. In the 1980s and 1990s Thailand gained a growing reputation for being a 'queer paradise' which led it being widely recognized as a global hub for transgender sex tourism. Thailand has a large and diverse transgender sex worker population, commonly referred to as "ladyboys" or kathoey. These sex workers are employed in a variety of venues, including massage parlors, go-go bars, karaoke bars, and cabaret shows. These establishments attract significant numbers of international tourists seeking transgender sex services.

== Sexually transmitted diseases ==
For much of human history, sexually transmitted diseases have been present. They raged unchecked through society until the discovery of antibiotics. The development of inexpensive condoms and education about sexually transmitted diseases has helped reduce risk of transmission.

=== AIDS ===
AIDS has profoundly changed modern sexuality. It was first noticed (although some historians think that the first case was in 1959) spreading among gay men and intravenous drug users in the 1970s and 1980s. Today, the majority of victims are heterosexual women, men, and children in developing countries due to a lack of access to healthcare and education resources. Mother-to-child transmissions also contribute to cases among children in these regions. Fear of contracting AIDS has driven a revolution in sex education, which now centers the use of protection and abstinence, and discusses sexually transmitted diseases and their prevention.

Further effects of this disease run deep, radically impacting the expected average lifespan as reported by the BBC News: "[The expected average lifespan] is falling in many African countries—a girl born today in Sierra Leone could expect only to live to 36, in contrast to Japan, where today's newborn girl might reach 85 on average."

== See also ==
- Bisexuality in the United States
- Cultural history of the buttocks
- Gay male pulp fiction
- History of bisexuality
- History of erotic depictions
- History of feminism
- History of gay men in the United States
- History of lesbianism in the United States
- History of lesbianism
- Homophobia
- Homosexuality in ancient Greece
- Homosexuality in ancient Rome
- Homosexuality in China
- Homosexuality in India
- Homosexuality in Japan
- Kagema
- Kamashastra
- Lesbian pulp fiction
- LGBT history
- LGBT history in the United States
- Pederasty
- Pederasty in ancient Greece
- Pedophilia
- Persecution of homosexuals in Nazi Germany
- Polyamory
- Pornography
- Pornocracy
- Sexual orientation
  - Asexuality
- Sexual revolution in 1960s United States
- Sexuality in ancient Rome
- Sexuality in South America
- Sexual revolution
- The History of Sexuality (book series)
- Timeline of LGBT history
- Transphobia
