= Yannick Marchand =

Yannick Marchand may refer to:

- Yannick Marchand (Belgian footballer), Belgian football full-back
- Yannick Marchand (Swiss footballer), Swiss football midfielder
