= Mercat =

Mercat may refer to:

- Mercat cross
- Mercat Press
- A marketplace

Characters:

- Mercat, a character in the series Gabby's Dollhouse

== See also ==
- Market (disambiguation)
- Mercator (disambiguation)
- Meerkat
