= Mercator =

Mercator (Latin for "merchant") often refers to the Mercator projection, a cartographic projection named after its inventor, Gerardus Mercator.

Mercator may also refer to:

== People ==
- Gerardus Mercator, 16th-century geographer, cosmographer, and cartographer
- Marius Mercator, (c. 390–451), a Catholic ecclesiastical writer
- Arnold Mercator, a 16th-century cartographer
- Rumold Mercator, a 16th-century cartographer
- Nicholas Mercator, a 17th-century mathematician
  - Mercator series, a representation of the natural logarithm

== Companies and universities ==
- Mercator (retail), a Slovenian supermarket chain
- Mercator-S, a retail company in Serbia, part of Agrokor Group
- Mercator Institute for China Studies, a German think tank with a focus on China
- Mercator Limited, a shipping company in India
- Mercator Research Institute on Global Commons and Climate Change, a German Institute for research about climate
- Mercator School of Management, University of Duisburg-Essen, Germany
- Mercator Corporation, a consulting firm and investment bank formed by James Giffen, involved with Kazakhgate

== Vehicles ==
- Mercator (ship), a barquentine museum ship in Oostende, Belgium
- P4M Mercator, a reconnaissance aircraft used by the United States Navy during the 1950s
- QinetiQ Mercator, a British unmanned aerial vehicle (UAV)
- SS Mercator and MV Mercator, a number of ships named Mercator

== Other ==
- Mercator 1569 world map, the first map in Mercator's projection
- Mercator Telescope, a Belgian telescope installed in La Palma, Canary Islands
- Mercator K55K, a type of pocketknife produced in Germany
- Mercator (play), a comedic play by Plautus
- IBM InfoSphere DataStage, software whose component DataStage TX was formerly known as Mercator and is now called WebSphere Transformation Extender
- "Mercator", a song by P-MODEL from the album Perspective II
- Mercator (crater), a lunar impact crater on the southwestern edge of Mare Nubium

== See also ==
- Kaufmann (German)
- Kofman or Koffman (Dutch)
- Marchant (French)
- Merchant (surname)
