= Taschen-Bibliothek der wichtigsten und interessantesten See- und Land-Reisen =

Taschen-Bibliothek der wichtigsten und interessantesten See- und Land-Reisen von der Erfindung der Buchdruckerkunst bis auf unsere Zeiten (Pocket Library of the most important and interesting Voyages and Travels from the Invention of the Art of Printing up to Our Times) is a German book series compiled by multiple scholars. The editor was Joachim Heinrich Jäck (1777–1847), a German Cistercian monk, librarian, local historian, and non-fiction author who served as Royal Librarian in Bamberg. It contains summaries of earlier travel accounts from the 16th to the early 19th centuries. The series comprised over 80 volumes and was published in Nuremberg by Haubenstricker and von Ebner between 1827 and 1836. The series presents reports, maps, and illustrations in German of scientific, cultural, and geographic voyages and expeditions to regions such as India, Egypt, Greece, Persia, Palestine, the Ottoman Empire, China, Africa, and the world's oceans. It includes the journeys of notable explorers such as James Cook, George Dixon, Étienne Marchand, John Turnbull, and Adam Johann von Krusenstern.

== See also ==
- Allgemeine Historie der Reisen zu Wasser und zu Lande (in German)
- General Collection of Voyages and Travels

== Bibliography ==
- Joachim Heinrich Jäck (Hrg): Taschen-Bibliothek der wichtigsten und interessantesten See- und Land-Reisen von der Erfindung der Buchdruckerkunst bis auf unsere Zeiten, Nürnberg, Haubenstricker und von Ebner 1827-1836 (digitized copies: a, b, c)
