= Marchant =

Marchant is a surname. Notable people with the surname include:

- Adio Marchant (born 1987), English singer and songwriter known professionally as Bipolar Sunshine
- Alison Marchant, Australian politician
- Cecil Marchant (1895–1965), English WW1 military pilot
- Chesten Marchant (died 1676), last monoglot Cornish speaker
- David R. Marchant, American glacial geologist
- Dougal Marchant, British motorcycle designer
- Edward Dalton Marchant (1806–1887), American artist
- George Marchant (1857–1941), Australian soft-drink manufacturer and philanthropist
- Henry Marchant (1741–1796), American lawyer and delegate to the Continental Congress (1777 to 1779)
- Sir Herbert Stanley Marchant, 20th Century British diplomat and writer
- Jeremy Marchant Forde (born 1966), English biologist
- John Le Marchant (British Army officer, born 1766) (1766–1812), English major-general
- Sir John Le Marchant (British Army officer, born 1803) (1803–1874), English general and Governor of Newfoundland
- Julio Marchant (born 1980), Argentine football (soccer) player
- Katy Marchant a(born 1993), British track cyclist
- Kenny Marchant (born 1951), Republican member of US House of Representatives
- Maria Elise Allman Marchant (1869–1919), New Zealand school principal
- Stephen Marchant (ornithologist) (1912–2003), Australian geologist and amateur ornithologist
- Stephen Marchant (actor), Irish actor
- Todd Marchant (born 1973), American ice hockey player
- Tony Marchant (playwright) (born 1959), British playwright and television dramatist
- Willim "Frenchie" Marchant, Northern Irish loyalist and Ulster Volunteer Force member

== See also ==
- Joker Marchant Stadium, baseball field located in Lakeland, Florida
- Marchant Calculator, American company, founded in 1911 by Rodney and Alfred Marchant
- Marchand, a surname
- Marchante, a surname
- Merchant (surname)
