= Marchante =

Marchante is a surnsme of Spanish origin, Notable people with that name include:

- José Ángel Gómez Marchante (born 1980), Spanish cyclist
- Karmele Marchante (born 1946), Spanish journalist and feminist

== See also ==
- Les Marchantes, a musical duo active in the 1920s
- Marchant, a surname
