= Merchant (surname) =

Merchant is a surname of Old French origin, meaning a merchant or trader, and was originally given as an occupational name to a buyer or seller of goods. The related French surname Marchand has a similar spelling. It is shared by the following people:

- Abby Shute Merchant (1882–1982), American writer
- Ajit Merchant (died 2011), Indian composer
- Ali Merchant (born 1988), Indian actor
- Andy Merchant (born 1950), American baseball player
- Anthony Merchant (1944–2025), Canadian lawyer and politician
- Cameron Merchant (born 1984), Australian cricketer
- Carolyn Merchant (born 1936), American ecofeminist philosopher and historian of science
- Firoz Merchant, Indian businessman in the United Arab Emirates
- Gary Merchant, American politician
- George Merchant (1926–2015), Scottish footballer
- Henry Merchant (1918–1982), American baseball player
- Hoshang Merchant (born 1947), Indian poet
- Ismail Merchant (1936–2005), Indian-born film producer
- J. Merchant (Sussex cricketer) (fl. 1791–1792)
- Jack Merchant (1899–1972), American athlete
- Jessica Merchant (born 1983), American softball coach
- Jimmy Merchant (born 1940), American musician
- Katherine Merchant (born 1985), English rugby union player
- Kenneth Merchant, American accounting educator
- Kishwer Merchant (born 1981), Indian actress
- Larry Merchant (born 1931), American sportswriter and commentator
- Lisa Merchant, Canadian actress
- Livingston T. Merchant (1903–1976), American diplomat
- Louis A. Merchant (1860–1950), American politician
- Mark Merchant (born 1969), American baseball player
- Minhaz Merchant, Indian journalist
- Moelwyn Merchant (1913–1997), Welsh academic, novelist, sculptor, poet and Anglican priest
- Natalie Merchant (born 1963), American musician
- Pana Merchant, (born 1943), Canadian politician
- Piers Merchant (1951–2009), British politician
- Sabeeha Merchant (born 1959), Indian-born American plant biologist
- Sabira Merchant (born 1942), Indian actress and etiquette trainer
- Salim Merchant, Indian musician
- Sally Merchant (1919–2007), Canadian television personality and politician
- Stephen Merchant (born 1974), British writer, director, and comic actor
- Sulaiman Merchant, Indian musician
- Suzy Merchant (born 1969), American basketball coach
- Tamzin Merchant (born 1987), British actress and poet
- Tanzeel Merchant, Canadian architect and urban planner
- Uday Merchant (1916–1985), Indian cricketer
- Vaibhavi Merchant (born 1975), Indian dance choreographer
- Verónica Merchant (born 1967), Mexican actress
- Vijay Merchant (1911–1987), Indian cricketer
- Vivien Merchant (1929–1982), British actress
- William Alfred Merchant (1919–2001), English clown
- Yahya Merchant (1903–1990), Indian architect
- Yasin Merchant (born 1966), Indian professional snooker player

== See also ==
- Kaufmann (in German)
- Koopman (in Dutch)
- Marchand (in French)
- Mercator (disambiguation) (in Latin)
