= Étienne Marchand =

French explorer (1755–1793)

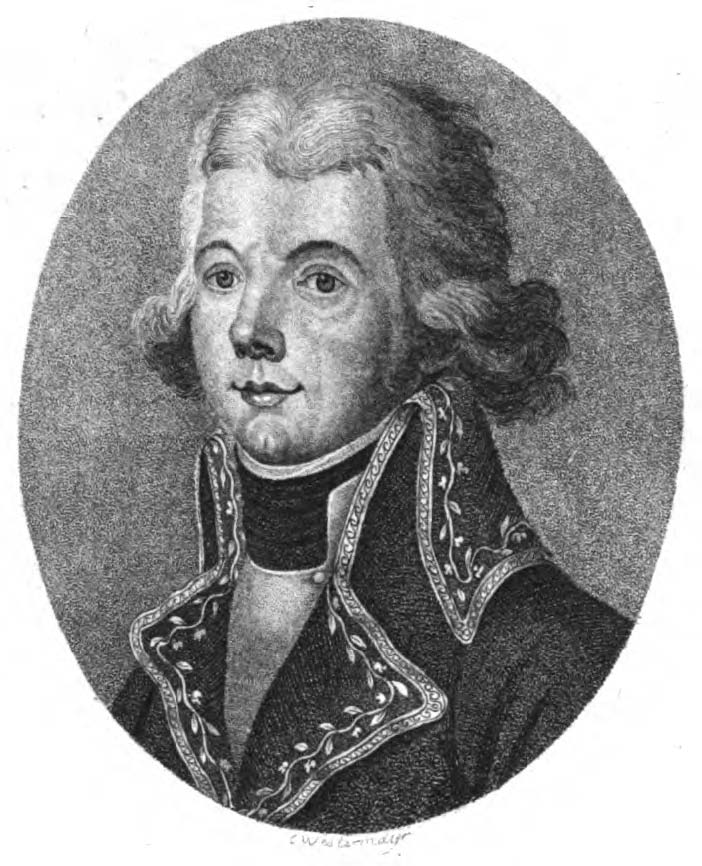
Étienne Marchand (engraved by Conrad Westermayr, 1805)

Étienne Marchand (1755–1793) was a French ship captain and explorer.

From 1790 to 1793 he undertook a commercial expedition to the Pacific, it was the first French commercial voyage to the Pacific Northwest and also the second successful circumnavigation by the French, after that by Bougainville. The main objective of the voyage was to trade fur from North America with Cantonese merchants and to return with Chinese merchandise for the home market. The Solide was a private merchant vessel fitted out in Marseille by the trading house of the brothers Jean und David Baux for a commercial voyage.

== Circumnavigation ==
Map of the Solide expedition: 1. Marseille, 2. Cape Verde, 3. Marquesas Islands, 4. Alexander Archipelago, Haida Gwaii, Vancouver Island, 5. Hawaii, 6. Macao, 7. Mauritius

The Solide left Marseille on 14 December 1790. In June 1791 Marchand reached the Marquesas Islands, where many bays were visited and surveyed and where he took possession of islands including Ua Pou and Nuku Hiva. In August 1791 he reached the northwest coast of America and traded for furs in areas including Norfolk Sound, Sitka, and Haida Gwaii. He then crossed the Pacific via the Sandwich Islands and the Marianas and arrived on 27 November 1791 in Macao, where he learned that a recently issued decree forbade the entry of any skin or fur into southern China. He left Macao on 6 December, sailed to the Île de France (Mauritius), and returned to France in August 1792.

The voyage was a commercial failure, but it provided numerous valuable observations on the Marquesas Islands and the northwest coast of America. It contained observations on navigation in the Pacific Ocean, on the peoples and the natural history of the regions visited, many of which were still unknown to earlier navigators and even to Cook. The narrative added considerably to the scanty knowledge of Northwest America and included detailed descriptions of Norfolk Sound, Sitka, and Haida Gwaii, as well as vocabularies of Marquesan languages.

Marchand died in 1793.

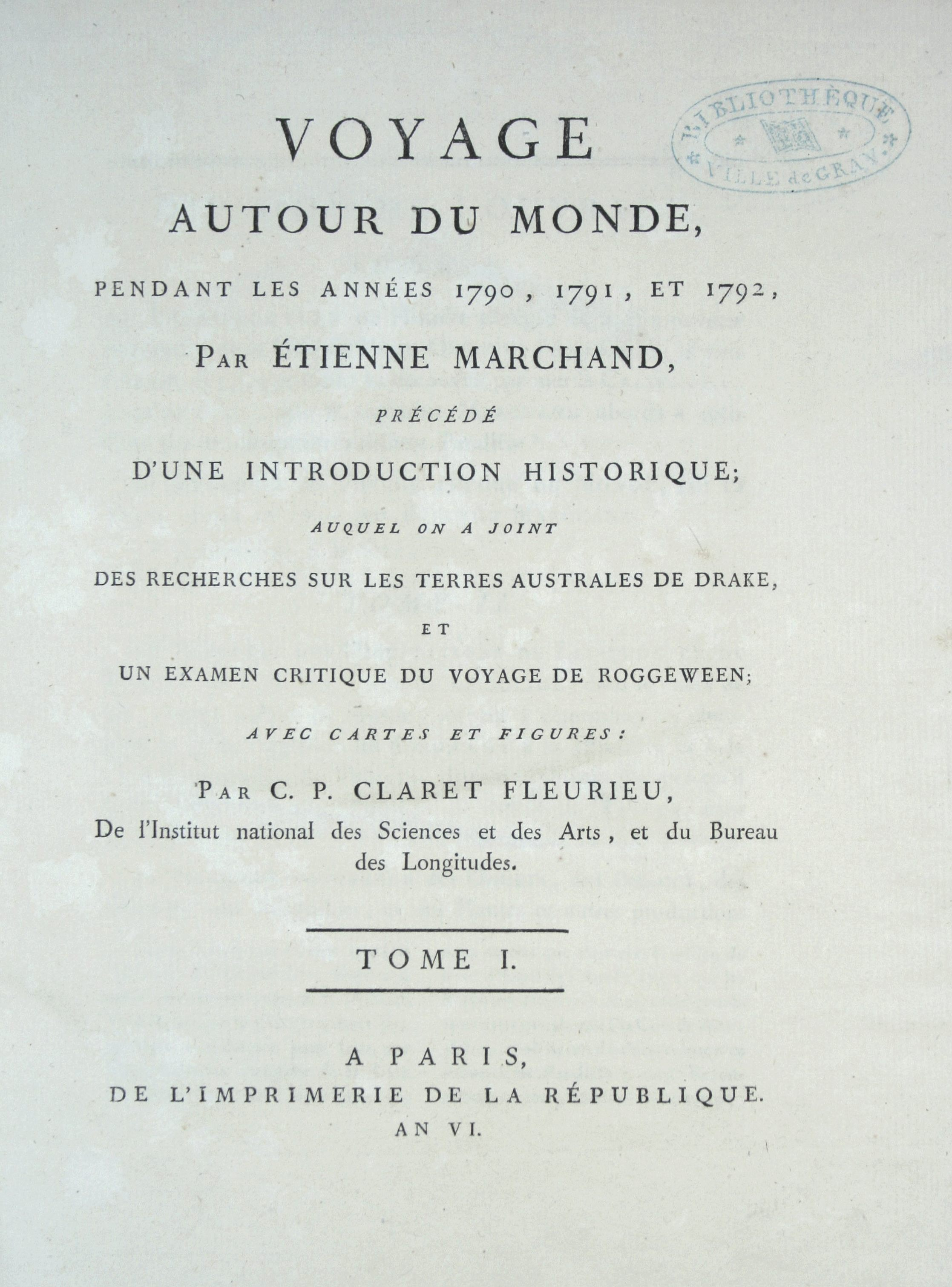
Voyage autour du monde, pendant les années 1790, 1791, et 1792, vol. 1 (title page)

The account of the voyage was published after his death as Voyage autour du monde, pendant les années 1790, 1791, et 1792 (A voyage round the world, performed during the years 1790, 1791, and 1792), edited by Charles-Pierre Claret de Fleurieu and printed in Paris by the Imprimerie de la République in 1798–1800. Fleurieu based the work primarily on the journal of Prosper Chanal, the second-in-command of the expedition, and on the notes of the ship’s surgeon Claude Roblet. The publication appeared in quarto and octavo editions with an atlas of engraved maps and charts and included historical introductions on earlier exploration of the North Pacific, a vocabulary of Vaitahu (Tahuata), hydrographic observations, and studies in natural history. The geographical, nautical, ethnographic, and zoological observations are compared with those of Spanish voyages (Mendaña and Quirós), Dutch voyages (Roggeveen), and English and American voyages (Cook, Ingraham, Hergest, and Roberts.

A Journal de bord d’Étienne Marchand, only recently published, provides insight into the scientific and commercial concerns of the merchant ship captain and reveals his naturalistic and ethnographic observations, 'echoes of contemporary texts'.

== Publications ==
- Voyage autour du monde par Étienne Marchand, précédé d'une introduction historique; auquel on a joint des recherches sur les terres australes de Drake, et un examen critique de voyage de Roggeween, avec cartes et figures, Paris, years VI-VIII, 4 vols. (1, 2, 3, 4 - Archive.org)
- Voyage autour du monde, pendant les années 1790, 1791, et 1792 par Étienne Marchand … Paris 1798 (online: Google Books: 1, 2, 3, 4, 5).
  - (English translation) A voyage round the world, performed during the years 1790, 1791, and 1792 by Etienne Marchand : preceded by a historical introduction and illustrated by charts, etc. London : Longman and Rees ... T. Cadell ... and W. Davies 1801. Fleurieu, C. P. Claret (Charles Pierre Claret), comte de, 1738-1810
  - (German translation) Die neueste Reise um die Welt in den Jahren 1790, 1791 und 1792. J. C. Hinrichs, Leipzig, 1802 (2 vols. in 1)
- Journal de bord d’Étienne Marchand. Le voyage du Solide autour du monde (1790-1792), 2 vol. 599 p. et 220 p., édition établie et présentée par Odile Gannier et Cécile Picquoin, CTHS, 2005, ISBN 978-2735505951

== See also ==
- Expédition du Solide (in French)
- Louis-Antoine-Cyprien Infernet
- La Pérouse
- Découverte de la terre : Histoire générale des grands voyages et des grands voyageurs (in French)

== Bibliography ==
- Patrick O'Reilly & Édouard Reitman: Bibliographie de Tahiti et de la Polynésie française. Ouvrage publié avec le concours du Centre National de la Recherche Scientifique. Publications de la Société des Océanistes, No. 14. Musée de l'Homme, Paris 1967 (in partial view)
- Jules Verne, Dora Leigh: The Exploration of the World: The great navigators of the eighteenth century. 1880
- Léon Guérin: Les Navigateurs français - Histoire des navigations, découvertes et colonisations françaises. Paris, Belin-Leprieur et Morizot, 1847
- F. J. A. Schneidawind: Stephan Marchand's Reise um die Welt in den Jahren 1790 bis 1792. Taschen-Bibliothek der wichtigsten und interessantesten See- und Land-Reisen, Band 76. Nürnberg 1831
