= Theodore J. Marchand =

American politician

Theodore J. Marchand is an American politician. He served as a Democratic member of the Louisiana House of Representatives from 1972 to 1976. He was arrested and charged with criminal mischief over allegations that he "verbally assaulted officers and beat on the police vehicle in a manner to be a threat" in 1973, but released on a $500 bond. In 1975, he proposed the additional funding of US$3 million to the Aid to Families with Dependent Children, which was approved by the House.
