= SS Mercator =

A number of steamships have been named Mercator, including –

- SS Mercator (1891), a Finnish cargo ship in service 1891–1916. Torpedoed and sunk in 1916.
- SS Mercator (1904), a Finnish cargo ship in service 1925–39. Torpedoed and sunk on 1 December.
- SS Mercator (1920), a Finnish cargo ship in service 1942–44, 1948–59. Scrapped in 1959.

See also

- MV Mercator (1943), a Landing Ship Tank, ex-USS LST-310. In service under this name between 1951 and 1963 for Norwegian, American and Argentinian owners.
