= Abby Shute Merchant =

American writer

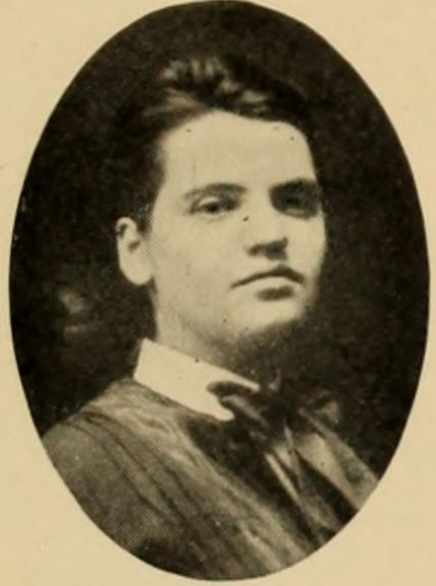
- Abby Shute Merchant, from the 1904 yearbook of Smith College
- Born: February 3, 1882; Gloucester, Massachusetts, U.S.
- Died: July 27, 1982 (age 100); Tryon, North Carolina, U.S.
- Occupations: Editor, poet, playwright

Abby Shute Merchant (February 3, 1882 – July 27, 1982) was an American editor, poet, and playwright.

== Early life and education ==
Merchant was born in Gloucester, Massachusetts, the daughter of Lewis H. Merchant and Hannah van P. Merchant. She attended Gloucester High School, where she was a friend of Bertha Mahony Miller, and graduated from Smith College in 1904. She took further courses in drama with George Pierce Baker at Harvard University.

== Career ==
Merchant was an editor at Munsey's Magazine and other magazines after college. She held a MacDowell Resident Fellowship in 1913–1914, to write a three-act play, His Womenfolk. She was briefly co-owner of the Prairie Playhouse in Galesburg, Illinois.

She returned to New York City and wrote plays, often in collaboration with Mark White Reed. Her 1922 comedy The Ever Green Lady had timely themes of tenement life, prohibition, and an influenza epidemic. Her 1941 comedy Your Loving Son starring Frankie Thomas ran for just three performances at the Little Theatre. New York critics called it "skittish but insistently dull", "silly", and "not amusing".

Merchant's stories and poems appeared in national publications including Harper's Magazine, Harper's Bazaar, Story Parade, Good Housekeeping, The Chautauquan, and New Idea.

== Works ==
=== Plays ===
- His Womenfolk (1914, play, 4 acts)
- Plus and Minus (1919, comedy, 3 acts)
- The Ever Green Lady (1922, comedy, 4 acts, also known as Irish Dew and The Topshelf)
- The New Englander (1924, drama, 4 acts)
- A New Frock for Pierrette (1933, revue)
- Your Loving Son (1941, comedy, also known as The Unbent Twig)

=== Poems, stories, and essays ===
- "A Sonnet" (1901, poem)
- "Overheard" (1902, essay)
- "Ivy Song" (1904, poem)
- "The Eternal Maternal" (1907, story)
- "Pernicious Pumps" (1908, story)
- "Marooned" (1910, essay)
- "College Girls Preferred" (1910, essay, with Annette Austin)
- "The Presentiment" (1917, story)
- "It Happened to Nickolas" (1921, novelette)
- "The House that Took a Trip" (1946, story)
- "The Stanley Squirrels" (1947, story)

== Personal life ==
Merchant and her older sister Helen retired to Tryon, North Carolina, together in 1949. She died in 1982, at the age of 100. There is a file of her typescripts at Smith College Archives.
