= Yannick Marchand (Belgian footballer) =

Belgian footballer

Personal information
- Full name: Yannick Marchand
- Date of birth: 15 August 1988 (age 38)
- Place of birth: Belgium
- Height: 1.73 m (5 ft 8 in)
- Position: Right back

Youth career
- –2008: Gent
- 2008–2009: Zulte Waregem

Senior career*
Years	Team	Apps	(Gls)
2009–2011	FCV Dender EH	30	(0)
2011–2012	KSC Grimbergen	23	(0)
2012–2014	KSK Ronse	34	
2014–2016	SV Voorde		
2016–XXXX	KSV Geraardsbergen		
- * Club domestic league appearances and goals

Yannick Marchand (born 15 August 1988) is a Belgian retired footballer.
