= Kaufmann =

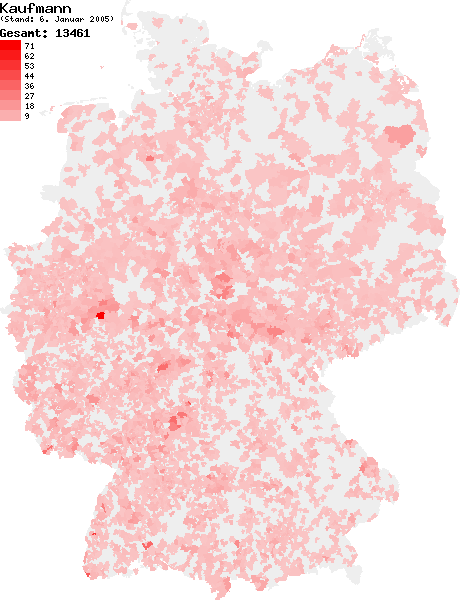
Distribution of the surname in Germany

Kaufmann is a surname with many variants such as Kauffmann, Kaufman, and Kauffman. In German, the name means merchant. It is the cognate of the English Chapman (the common noun chapman 'merchant' has fallen out of use). Kaufmann may refer to:

== Kaufmann ==
- Alexander Kaufmann (1817–1893), German poet and folklorist, brother of Leopold
- Aloys P. Kaufmann (1902–1984), Mayor of St. Louis, Missouri
- Andrea Kaufmann (born 1969), Austrian politician
- Andreas Kaufmann (born 1973), German footballer
- Andy Kaufmann (born 1967), American basketball player
- Arthur Kaufmann (1872–1938), Austrian attorney, philosopher and chess master
- Arthur Kaufmann (artist) (1888–1971), German avant-garde painter
- Bobby Kaufmann (born 1985), American politician
- Carl Kaufmann (1936–2008), West German sprint runner
- Christian Kaufmann (alpine guide) (1872–1939), Swiss mountain guide active in Canada
- Christian Kaufmann (canoeist) (born c. 1940), West German slalom canoeist
- Christine Kaufmann (1945–2017), German-Austrian actress, author, and businesswoman
- Christine Kaufmann (politician) (born 1951), Montana State Senate
- Christoph Kaufmann (1753–1795), Swiss figure of the Sturm und Drang
- Daniel Kaufmann (footballer) (born 1990), Liechtensteiner footballer
- Danielly Kaufmann (born 1984), Luxembourg-Brazilian visual artist
- David Kaufmann (1852–1899), Jewish-Austrian scholar
- Dieter Kaufmann (1941–2025), Austrian composer
- Edgar J. Kaufmann (1885–1955), US businessman and philanthropist
- Eduard Kaufmann (1860–1931), German physician and co-discoverer of the Abderhalden–Kaufmann–Lignac syndrome
- Elsie Effah Kaufmann (1969), Ghanaian academic and biomedical engineer
- Eric Kaufmann (born 1970), Canadian demographer
- Ernst Kaufmann (1895–1943), Swiss racing cyclist
- Eugen Kaufmann (1892–1984), German architect
- Evan Kaufmann (born 1984), German-American ice hockey player
- Fabio Kaufmann (born 1992), German-Italian footballer
- Felix Kaufmann (1895–1949), Austrian-American law philosopher
- Franz Kaufmann (1886–1944), German jurist and victim of the Holocaust
- Franziska Kaufmann (born 1987), Swiss curler
- Fritz Kaufmann (1905–1941), Swiss ski jumper and Nordic combined skier
- George Adams Kaufmann (1894–1963), British mathematician, translator and anthroposophist
- Gordon Kaufmann (1888–1949), English-born American architect
- Günther Kaufmann (1947–2012), German actor
- Hans Kaufmann (born 1948), Swiss politician and business consultant
- Heinz Kaufmann (1913–1997), German rower
- Herbert Kaufmann (1920–1976), German ethnologist, journalist, photographer and writer
- Hermann Kaufmann (born 1955), Austrian architect
- Hilde Kaufmann (1920–1981), German jurist and criminologist
- Isidor Kaufmann (1853–1921), Austro-Hungarian painter
- Jeff Kaufmann (born 1963), American politician
- Jonas Kaufmann (born 1969), German tenor
- Judith Kaufmann (born 1962), German cinematographer
- Julia Kaufmann (born 1984), German voice actress
- Karl Kaufmann (painter) (1843–1905), Austrian landscape and architectural painter
- Karl Kaufmann (1900–1965), German Nazi Gauleiter in Hamburg
- Karl Maria Kaufmann (1872-1951), German Biblical archaeologist
- Konstantin von Kaufmann (1818–1882), Russian general, for whom "Mount Kaufmann" (or "Peak Kaufmann", now called Lenin Peak) was named
- Klaus Kaufmann (born 1948), Austrian pianist who founded the Austrian-Chinese-Music-University
- Lars Kaufmann (born 1982), German handball player
- Leon Kaufmann (1872–1933), Polish painter and pastellist
- Leonhard Kaufmann (born 1989) Austrian footballer
- Leopold Kaufmann (1821–1898), German politician, brother of Alexander
- Malte Kaufmann (born 1976), German economist, entrepreneur and politician
- Manfred Kaufmann (born 1978), Liechtenstein politician
- Maurice Kaufmann (1927–1997), British actor
- Max R. Kaufmann, designer of the Kaufmann font family
- Max Rudolf Kaufmann (1886–1963), Swiss author, translator, and journalist
- Michael Kaufmann (born 1964), German politician
- Miranda Kaufmann (born 1982), British historian
- Myron Kaufmann (1921–2010), American author
- Nico Kaufmann (1916–1996), Swiss pianist and composer
- Oskar Kaufmann (1873–1956), Hungarian-German Jewish architect
- Patricia A. (Trish) Kaufmann of Lincoln, Delaware
- Peter Kaufmann (Alpine guide) (1872–1939), Swiss mountain guide from Grindelwald
- Peter Kaufmann (politician) (born 1947), politician and businessman in Winnipeg
- Peter Kaufmann-Bohren (1886–1971), Swiss mountain guide
- Rainer Kaufmann (born 1959), German film director
- Richard von Kaufmann (1850–1908), German jurist and art collector
- Rudolf Kaufmann (1909–1941), German palaeontologist and geologist, son of Walter (physicist)
- Sören Kaufmann (born 1971), German slalom canoeist
- Stefan Kaufmann (musician) (born 1960), German drummer
- Stefan Kaufmann (politician) (born 1969), German Bundestag member
- Stefan H.E. Kaufmann (born 1948), German microbiologist
- Stevie Kaufmann, (1913–2004), American socialite
- Sylvia-Yvonne Kaufmann (born 1955), German politician
- Theodore Kaufmann (1814–1896), German-American painter
- Ulrich Kaufmann (1840–1917), Swiss mountain guide
- Walter Kaufmann (author) (1924–2021), German-Australian writer
- Walter Kaufmann (composer) (1907–1984), Czech-born American ethnomusicologist
- Walter Kaufmann (philosopher) (1921–1980), German philosopher
- Walter Kaufmann (physicist) (1871–1947), German physicist
- William Kaufmann (1918-2008) American nuclear strategist
- William G. Kaufmann (1869–1947), American politician
- Yehezkel Kaufmann (1889–1963), Israeli philosopher and Biblical scholar

=== Given name ===
- Isaac Kaufmann Funk (1839–1912), American editor, lexicographer
- Kaufmann Kohler (1843–1926), German-born American Bible scholar, Reform rabbi and theologian

== Kauffmann ==
- Fritz Kauffmann (1855–1934), German composer and conductor
- Fritz Kauffmann (bacteriologist) (1899–1978), German-Danish bacteriologist (Kauffmann–White classification)
- Georg Friedrich Kauffmann (1679–1735), German Baroque composer
- Guinevere Kauffmann (born 1968), German-American astrophysicist
- Henrik Kauffmann (1888–1962), Danish ambassador to United States of America
- Jean-Paul Kauffmann (born 1944), French journalist and writer
- Lillian von Kauffmann (1920–2016), Danish businesswoman
- Stanley Kauffmann (1916–2013), long-time film critic for The New Republic

== Kaufman ==
- Aaron Kaufman, American mechanic and fabricator, featured on the television show Fast N' Loud
- Abraham Kaufman (1885–1971), Russian-born medical doctor, community organizer and Zionist
- Alan Kaufman (writer), American novelist and poet
- Alan S. Kaufman (born 1944), psychologist/IQ test developer
- Alexis Kaufman (born 1991), birth name of American professional wrestler Alexa Bliss
- Allen Kaufman (born 1933), chess professional
- Alvin Ratz Kaufman (1885–1979), Canadian industrialist, philanthropist, and birth control advocate
- Amie Kaufman (born 1980), an Australian author.
- Andrew Kaufman (born 1968), Canadian writer
- Andy Kaufman (1949–1984), American entertainer
- Ariel Durant (born Chaya Kaufman, 1898–1981), historian and writer, wife of Will Durant
- Arnold Kaufman (1927-1971), American political philosopher
- Bel Kaufman (1911–2014), author of Up the Down Staircase and granddaughter of Sholom Aleichem
- Benjamin Kaufman (Medal of Honor) (1894–1981), World War I Medal of Honor recipient
- Boris Kaufman (1906–1980), younger brother of Dziga Vertov
- Brandon Kaufman (born 1990), American football player
- Bruria Kaufman (1918–2010), Israeli theoretical physicist
- Charlie Kaufman (born 1958), American screenwriter, producer, director, and lyricist
- Dan Kaufman, special effects artist
- David Kaufman (actor) (born 1961), American voice actor
- David Kaufman (author), theater critic
- David S. Kaufman (1813–1851), American politician, Republic of Texas State Senator
- Donald Kaufman (collector) (1930–2009), American toy collector
- Edward E. "Ted" Kaufman (born 1939), American politician
- Elaine Kaufman (1929–2010), American restaurateur
- George S. Kaufman (1889–1961), American playwright
- Gerald Kaufman (1930–2017), British member of parliament
- Gordon D. Kaufman (1925–2011), American theologian
- Grace Kaufman (born 2002), American child actress
- Harold R. Kaufman (1926–2018), American physicist, developed Kaufman ion source
- Henry Kaufman (born 1927), German-American economist
- Herbert Kaufman (1878–1947)
- Irving Kaufman (1910–1992), American federal judge
- Irving Kaufman (singer) (1890–1976), American entertainer
- Jacob Kaufman, (1847–1920), Canadian manufacturer and industrialist
- Jake Kaufman (born 1981), American video game music composer
- James C. Kaufman, American psychologist
- James D. Kaufman, American politician
- Jane Kaufman (1938-2021), American artist
- Joan Kaufman (psychologist), American child psychologist
- Josh Kaufman (singer) (born 1976), American musician and winner of NBC's The Voice season 6
- Les Kaufman, Professor of Biology at Boston University
- Lloyd Kaufman (born 1945)
- Louis Kaufman (1905–1994), violinist
- Mel Kaufman (1958–2009), football player for the Washington Redskins
- Micha Kaufman (born 1946), Israeli Olympic sport shooter
- Millard Kaufman (1917–2009), American screenwriter and novelist
- Morris Kaufman, Manitoba judge
- Moisés Kaufman (born 1963), playwright and director
- Murray the K (Murray Kaufman, 1922–1982)
- Nadeen L. Kaufman (born 1945), psychologist/IQ test developer
- Napoleon Kaufman (born 1973), American football player
- Nikolay Kaufman (1925–2018), Bulgarian musicologist
- Philip Kaufman (born 1936), film director
- Philip A. Kaufman (Phil Kaufman), American engineer, namesake of the Phil Kaufman Award
- Robert Kaufman (1931–1991), American screenwriter and film producer
- Ruth Kaufman, British operations research specialist
- Sean Kaufman (born 2000), actor
- Smylie Kaufman (born 1991), professional golfer
- Steve Kaufman (1960–2010), artist
- Ted Kaufman (born 1939), United States Senator from Delaware from 2009 to 2010
- Terrence Kaufman (1937–2022), linguist and professor at the University of Pittsburgh
- Theodore N. Kaufman (1910–1986), businessman and writer
- Trey Kaufman-Renn (born 2002), American basketball player
- Vlodko Kaufman (born 1957), Ukrainian artist
- Wendy Kaufman (born 1958), American television personality
- William E. Kaufman (born 1938), American rabbi, philosopher
- Dr. Kaufman, a villain in Tomorrow Never Dies

== Kauffman ==
- Angelica Kauffman (1741–1807), Swiss-Austrian painter
- Bob Kauffman (1946–2015), American basketball player
- Calvin Henry Kauffman (1869–1931), American botanist and mycologist
- Claudia Kauffman, Washington State Senate (served 2007–2011)
- Craig Kauffman (1932–2010), American artist
- Doug Kauffman (born 1969), American curler and golfer
- Draper Kauffman (1911–1979), Rear Admiral, U.S. Navy and son of James L. Kauffman, with whom he was the joint namesake of USS Kauffman (FFG-59)
- Elizabeth Bush, born Kauffman
- Ewing Marion Kauffman (1916–1993), former owner of the Kansas City Royals and namesake of Kauffman Stadium
- George B. Kauffman (1930–2020), American chemist
- James Laurence Kauffman (1887–1963), United States Navy Vice Admiral and father of Draper Kauffman, with whom he was the joint namesake of USS Kauffman (FFG-59)
- John D. Kauffman (1847–1913), Amish "sleeping preacher"
- Leah Kauffman (born c.1986), American actress, singer and songwriter
- Léon Kauffman (1869–1952), 12th Prime Minister of Luxembourg
- Louis Kauffman (born 1945), American mathematician
- Marta Kauffman (born 1956), TV producer and writer
- Matthew Kauffman (born 1961), journalist
- Nehemiah Kauffman (c.1996–2016), American victim of unsolved shooting
- Sandra Kauffman (born 1933), American politician from Missouri
- Scott Kauffman (born 1956), businessman
- Stuart Kauffman (born 1939), US theoretical biologist and complex systems researcher

== See also ==
- Kauffman Amish Mennonite
- Kaufmann's (Kaufmann's Furniture Galleries), regional department store chain
- Kofman, Koffman, Yiddish equivalents
- Koopman, Dutch equivalent
