= Kofman =

Kofman is a surname. Notable people with the surname include:

- Abram Kofman, (1865–1940), Russian Esperanto poet
- Bereck Kofman (1900–1943), French rabbi
- Boaz Kofman (born 1935), Israeli footballer
- Celina Kofman (1924–2020), Argentine human rights activist
- Galina Kofman, American computer scientist
- Jeffrey Kofman (born 1959), Canadian television journalist
- Michael Kofman, American military analyst
- Roman Kofman (1936–2026), Ukrainian composer and conductor
- Sarah Kofman (1934–1994), French philosopher

== See also ==
- Kaufmann, surname
- Koffman, surname
