= Joan Kaufman =

Joan Kaufman may refer to:

- Joan Kaufman (baseball)
- Joan Kaufman (psychologist)
