= Peter Röhlinger =

German politician

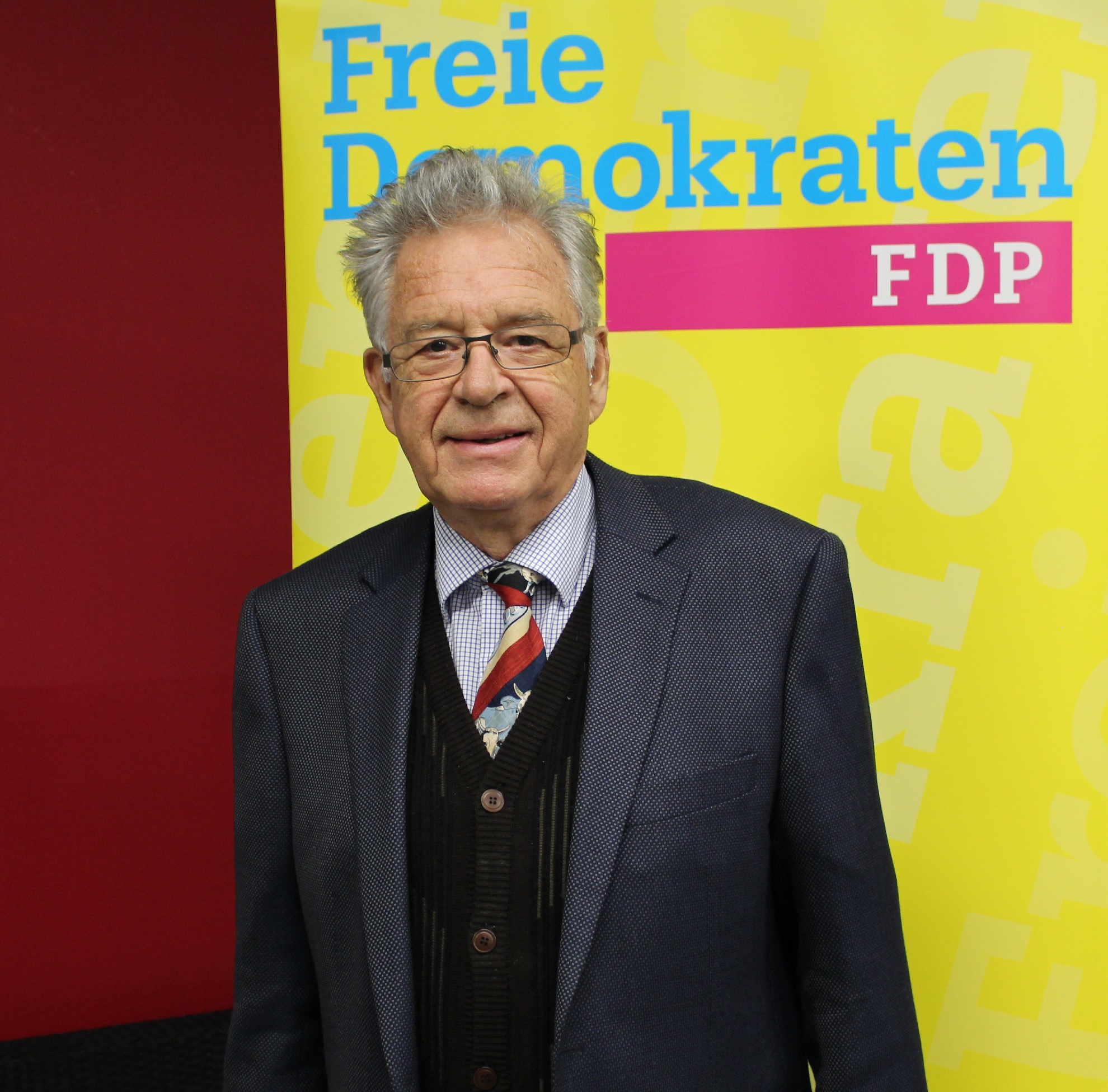
Peter Röhlinger (2017)

Peter Röhlinger (born 8 February 1939) is a German politician and member of the Free Democratic Party (FDP). From 1990 to 2006 he was the mayor (Oberbürgermeister) of the city of Jena and from 2009 to 2013 he was an elected representative in the Bundestag.

== Personal life ==
Röhlinger began his studies in veterinary medicine at the University of Leipzig in 1958, and following the successful completion of his exams in 1964 worked as a veterinarian in a state-owned veterinary practice. He was soon afterwards employed as a lecturer and scientist in the School for Veterinary Medicine (Fachschule für Veterinärmedizin) in Beichlingen. He later completed the promotion A and B from the University of Leipzig.

Röhlinger is Catholic and has three children.

== Politics ==
During the 1990 mayoral election in Jena, the main political parties agreed to a suggestion put forward by the Social Democratic Party (SPD) to throw their collective support behind Röhlinger, the FDP candidate. Röhlinger was re-elected in 1994 and 2000.

Within the Thuringian FDP, Röhlinger held the position of provincial chairman (Landesvorsitze) from 3 December 1994 to 20 March 1999. He was also a member of the FDP Friedrich Naumann Foundation. In the 2009 German federal election, Röhlinger was elected to the Bundestag on place 2 of the provincial list of FDP for Thuringia. As a FDP direct candidate in Gera – Jena – Saale-Holzland-Kreis, he received 9.7% of the first votes. He did not run again during the 2013 federal election.

On 26 February 2016, Röhlinger was awarded honorary citizenship of the city of Jena in recognition of his achievements as mayor.

| Preceded by Martin Otto | Mayor of Jena; 1990 – 2006 | Succeeded by Albrecht Schröter |
