= Koffman =

Koffman is a surname. Notable people with the surname include:

- Elliot Koffman (born 1942), computer scientist and educationist
- Laura Koffman (born Laura Bonarrigo), American actress
- Moe Koffman (1928–2001), Canadian jazz saxophonist and flautist

== See also ==
- Kofman
