= Neplachovice =

- Municipality
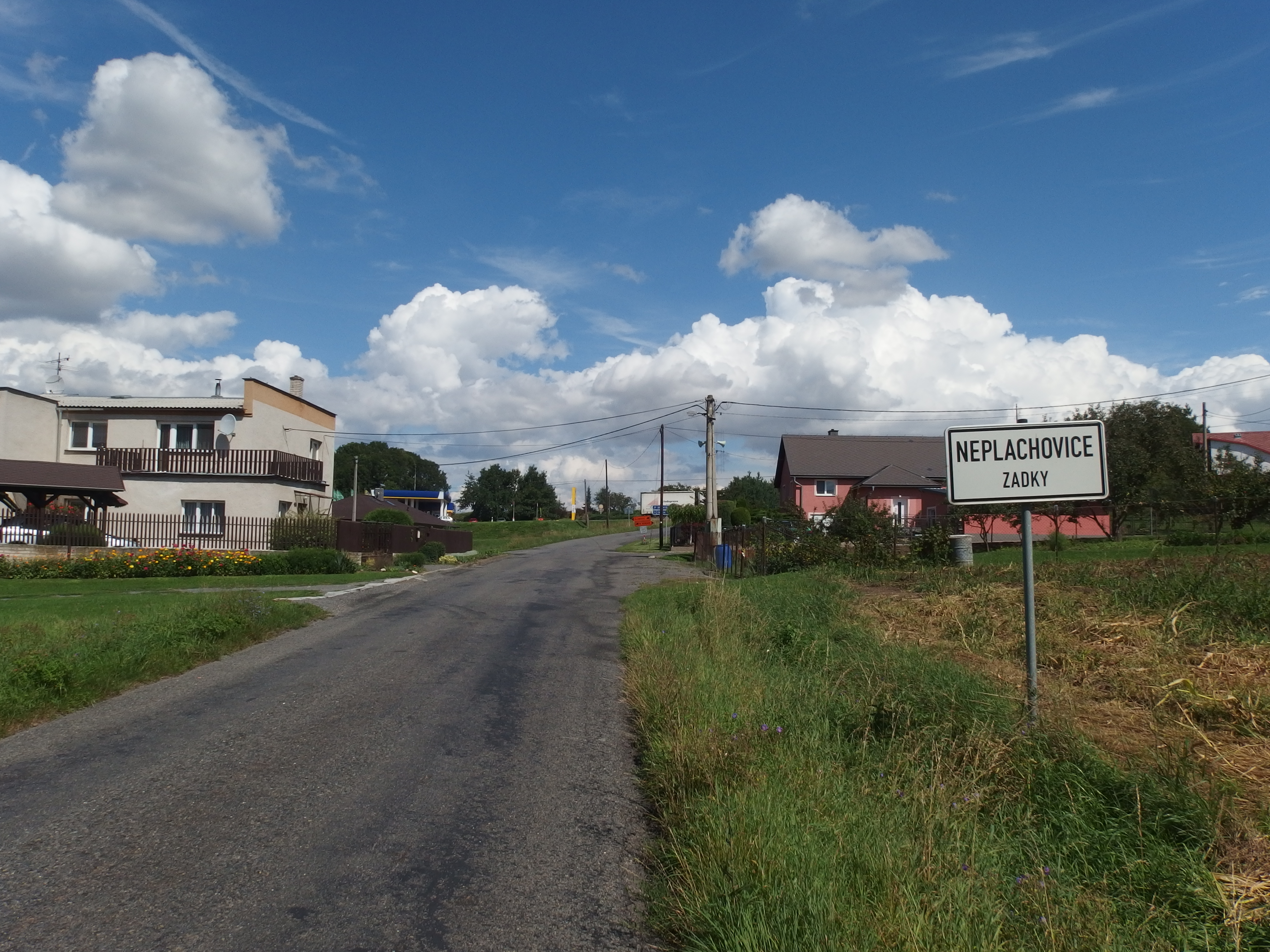
- Zadky, a part of Neplachovice

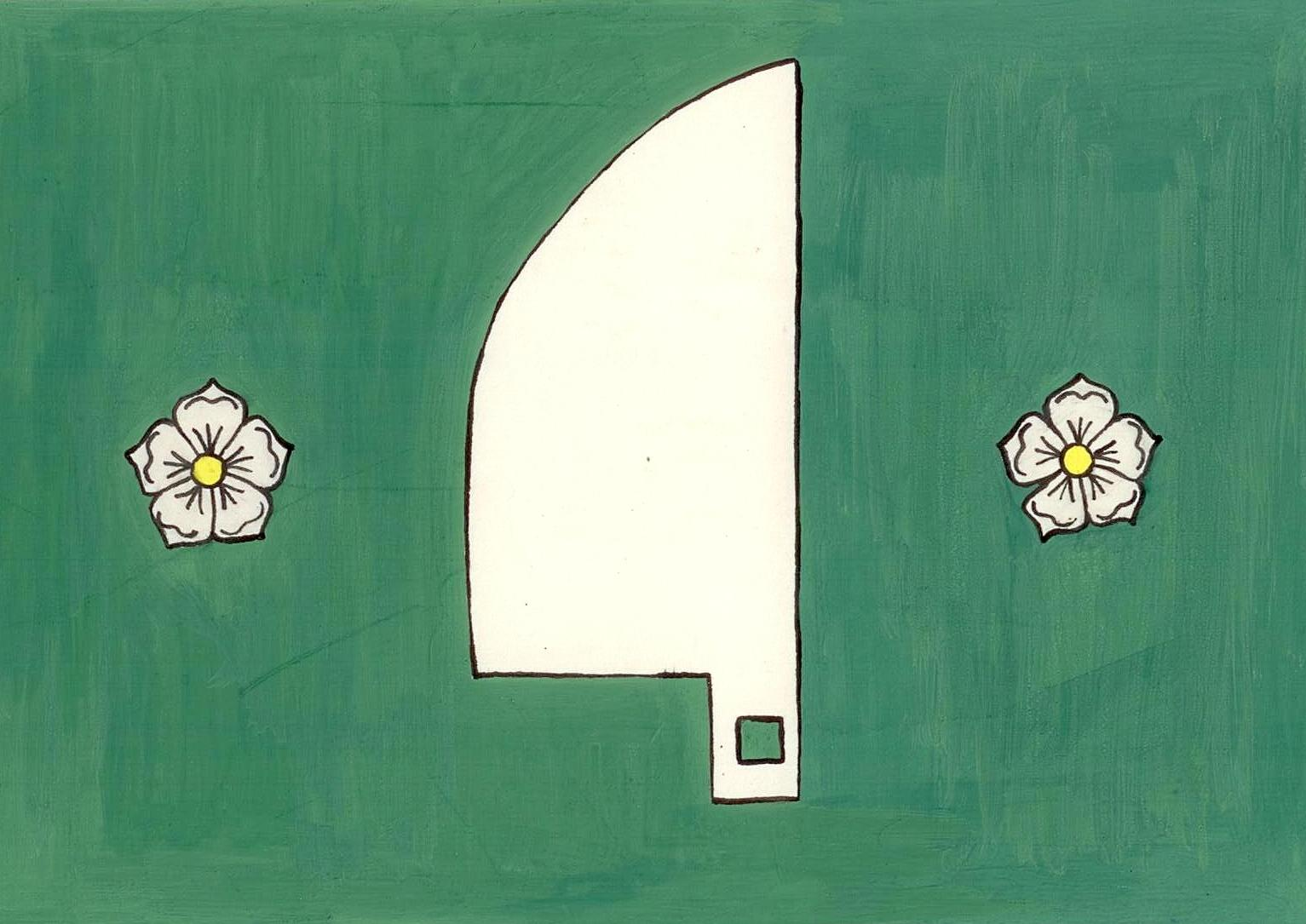
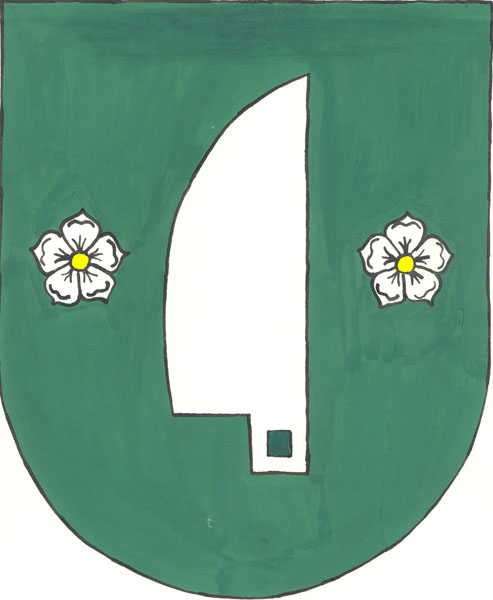
- Flag Coat of arms

- Location in the Czech Republic
- Coordinates: 49°59′32″N 17°48′36″E
- Country: Czech Republic
- Region: Moravian-Silesian
- District: Opava
- First mentioned: 1257

Area
  - Total: 5.73 km^{2} (2.21 sq mi)
- Elevation: 278 m (912 ft)

Population (2026-01-01)
  - Total: 940
  - Density: 160/km^{2} (420/sq mi)
- Time zone: UTC+1 (CET)
  - Summer (DST): UTC+2 (CEST)
- Postal code: 747 74
- Website: www.neplachovice.cz

Neplachovice (German: Neplachowitz) is a municipality and village in Opava District in the Moravian-Silesian Region of the Czech Republic. It has about 900 inhabitants.

== Administrative division ==
Neplachovice consists of two municipal parts (in brackets population according to the 2021 census):

- Neplachovice (808)
- Zadky (102)

== History ==
The first written mention of Neplachovice is from 1257.

== Demographics ==
Historical population
Year	Pop.	±%
1869	663	—
1880	722	+8.9%
1890	690	−4.4%
1900	745	+8.0%
1910	762	+2.3%
1921	732	−3.9%
1930	797	+8.9%
1950	637	−20.1%
1961	699	+9.7%
1970	670	−4.1%
1980	854	+27.5%
1991	826	−3.3%
2001	828	+0.2%
2011	901	+8.8%
2021	910	+1.0%
Source: Censuses

== Notable people ==
- Karl Kaufmann (1843–1905), Austrian painter
- Alfred Schreiber (1923–1944), German fighter pilot
