= Thomas Nitzsche =

German politician (born 1975)

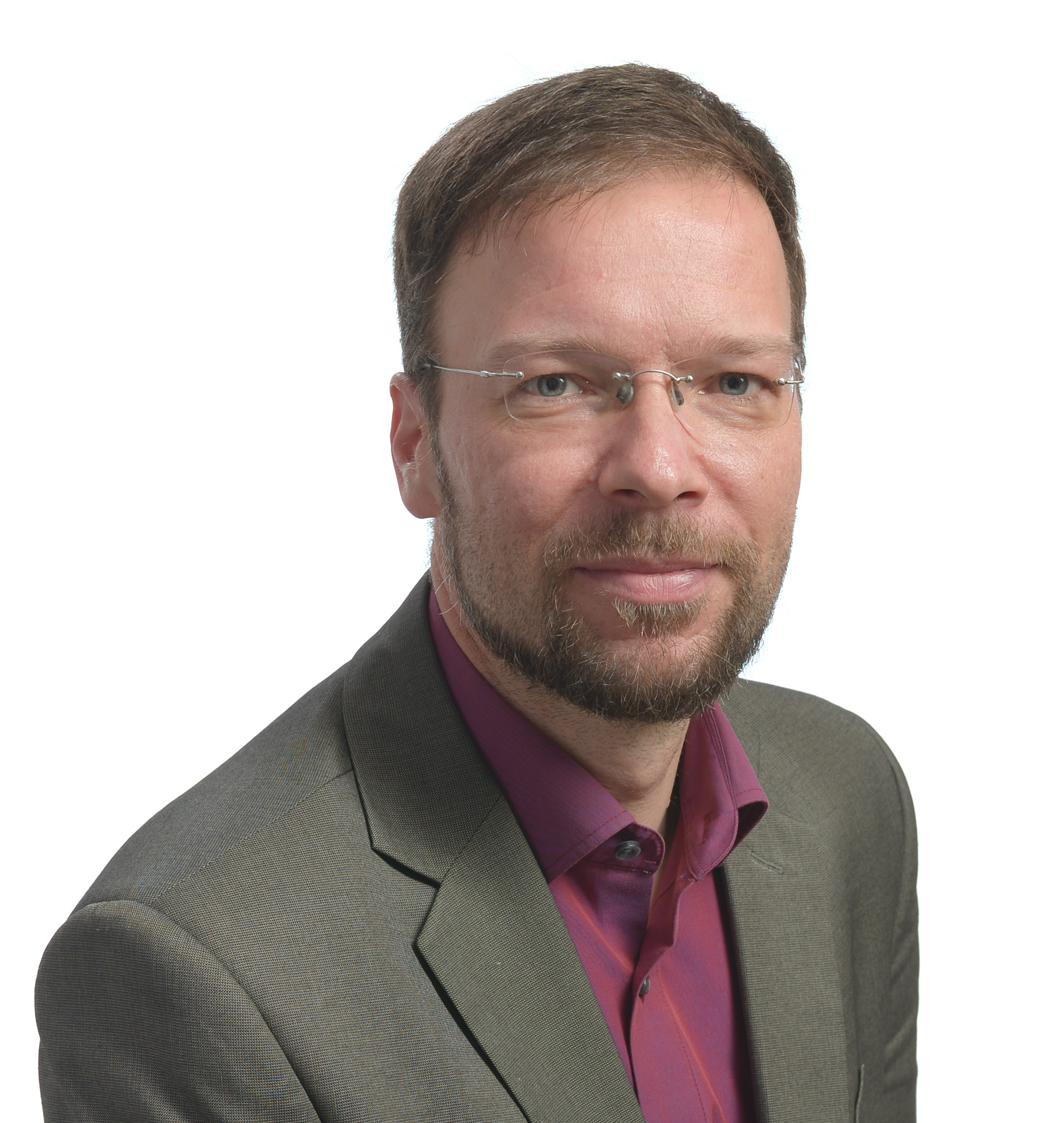
- Nitzsche in 2018

Mayor of Jena
- Incumbent
- Assumed office 1 July 2018
- Preceded by: Albrecht Schröter

Personal details
- Born: 1 December 1975 (age 50) Zeulenroda, East Germany
- Party: Free Democratic Party of Germany (FDP)
- Education: University of Jena
- Website: https://www.jena.de/de/233674

Thomas Nitzsche (born 1 December 1975 in Zeulenroda) is a German politician (FDP) and the Mayor of Jena since 1 July 2018.

== Career ==
Nitzsche attended the Hubert Westhoff Polytechnic High School in Zeulenroda from 1982 to 1991, and the Carl-Zeiss-Gymnasium in Jena from 1991 until achieving his Abitur in 1994. In 1995, he began studies in English and political science at the Friedrich Schiller University of Jena. He remained in Jena until graduation, apart from a year in Glasgow and a quarter-term in Salamanca. While at FSU Jena, Nitzsche was a research assistant to Klaus Dicke, later Rector of the university. For his graduate thesis in 2007, he wrote about the Spanish liberal politician Salvador de Madariaga. From 2008 until he took office as mayor, Nitzsche was a subject specialist (Fachreferent) at the Thuringian University and State Library (ThULB).

== Politics ==
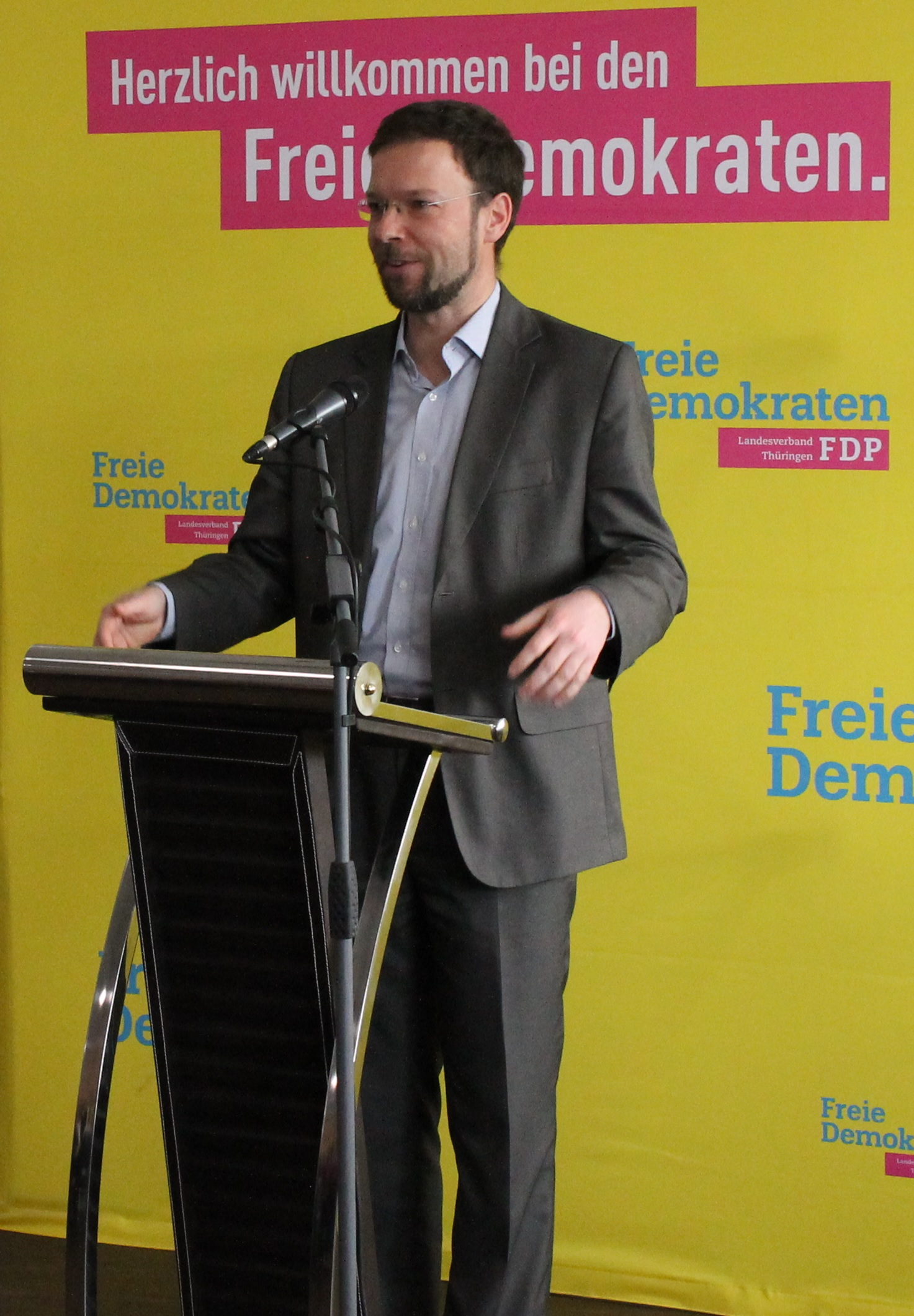
Nitzsche at a campaign event in the spring of 2018

In 2003, Nitzsche became district chairman for the Young Liberals in Jena and in 2007, he became district chairman for the FDP. Since 2009, he earned a place on the city council of Jena. In the 2012 Thuringian municipal elections, he ran for the position of Mayor of Jena for the first time and received 2.4% of the vote. In the 2013 German federal election, he ran for the FDP in the constituency Gera - Jena - Saale-Holzland-Kreis. Nitzsche is presently the acting chairman of the FDP Thuringia. In the city council of Jena, he was chairman of committees on youth welfare and school development and of the kindergarten subcommittee. Until his election, he also headed the advisory board for motor vehicle traffic in Jena and was a knowledgeable citizen member of the Urban Development Committee.

In the 2018 Thuringian municipal elections, Nitzsche ran a successful campaign as the FDP candidate for the position of Mayor of Jena. In the first ballot on 15 April 2018, he received at 26.9% the most votes of the nine candidates. In particular, he outperformed the incumbent mayor Albrecht Schröter, a result which was considered surprising to most observers. In the subsequent runoff ballot on 29 April 2018, Nitzsche defeated Schröter with 63.3% of the vote.

== Personal ==
Nitzsche has been married since 1998 and has a daughter and a son.

== Publications ==
- Thomas Nitzsche: Salvador de Madariaga: Liberaler – Spanier – Weltbürger. Der Weg eines politischen Intellektuellen durch das Europa des 20. Jahrhunderts. Univ.-Diss., Jena 2007 (in German).

Preceded by Albrecht Schröter	Mayor of Jena; 2018 – present	Incumbent
