= Curt Teichert =

American paleontologist

Curt Teichert (May 8, 1905 in Königsberg, East Prussia – May 10, 1996 in Arlington, Virginia) was a German-American palaeontologist and geologist, noted for his contributions to geology, paleozoic stratigraphy and paleontology, Cephalopoda, ancient and modern reefs, and correlation, the matching of strata of the same age in different locations.

He studied geology at universities in Munich, Freiburg and Königsberg, receiving his Ph.D. degree from Albertus University in Königsberg in 1928. The same year he married Gertrud Kaufmann, daughter of Walter Kaufmann, a physics professor in Königsberg, and sister to Rudolf Kaufmann, the tragically short-lived palaeontologist. He was appointed as assistant at Freiburg from where he went to Washington to study cephalopods on a one-year Rockefeller Foundation award in 1930. In 1931–32 he took part as geologist in a Danish expedition to Greenland. With the rise of the Nazi Party in Germany in the 1930s, he was advised by the University to divorce his wife as she had a Jewish ancestry. The couple hastily left for Copenhagen in 1933, and eked out a living there for the next four years.

A Carnegie Foundation grant in 1937 enabled the Teicherts to settle in Australia where Curt had been offered a position at the University of Western Australia in Perth. Here he was the only palaeontologist in a vast and unexplored fossil-rich area. With the outbreak of World War II the Teicherts were interned by the authorities, and were later offered a trip back to Germany in exchange for Australian prisoners of war, an offer which was politely declined. The position as research lecturer at Perth lasted from 1937 to 1945. During the war years he investigated reefs from a naval shipping point of view, and was a consultant to Caltex in their search for oil in Western Australia.

After the War he became assistant chief geologist in the Mines Department of Victoria until 1947, and lastly senior lecturer at the University of Melbourne until 1952. In 1949 Raymond C. Moore of the University of Kansas had asked Teichert to assist in compiling a volume on the Cephalopoda for the Treatise on Invertebrate Paleontology (1953–1981). A Fulbright Fellowship allowed Teichert to go on a fifty-university tour in 1951–52 to interview potential contributors to this volume.

In 1952 Teichert started work at the New Mexico School of Mines in Socorro where he studied the local Devonian age rocks, his paper being published by the U.S. Geological Survey. In 1954 he joined the USGS, setting up a laboratory and the necessary infrastructure at the Denver Federal Center. He also found time to return to Germany as guest professor of the universities of Bonn, Freiberg, and Göttingen.

The success of the Denver laboratory led to Teichert's transferring to Quetta in Pakistan in 1961, where an International Development-USGS project was improving the minerals and exploration mapping. Teichert's part in the program was a detailed study of the Permian-Triassic boundary in the Salt Range. He helped develop a National Stratigraphic Code for Pakistan, leading to stratigraphic correlations among Pakistan, Iran, and Turkey, all members of the Central Treaty Organization.

When the Pakistan project was wrapped up in 1964, Teichert became Regents’ Professor at the University of Kansas. During this period he edited seven volumes of the Treatise on Invertebrate Paleontology. He left the University of Kansas in 1977 for the University of Rochester in New York where he stayed until 1993. He left Rochester in 1995, two years after his wife's death, and moved to Arlington in Virginia to close out his final years near many of his friends and former associates.

During his career Teichert served on the faculties of seven universities on three continents. He was co-editor of the Treatise on Invertebrate Paleontology from 1964 to 1979, president of the Paleontological Society in 1971–72, and president of the International Paleontological Association between 1976 and 1980. His major moves were from Europe to Australia in 1937, and Australia to the US in 1952.

The Curt Teichert Festschrift (Ellis Yochelson, Wolfgang Struve, editor, Senckenbergiana Lethaea, v. 69, 628 p., 1988/1989) describes his many notable contributions to palaeontology. He authored or co-authored more than 325 papers during his lifetime.

== Selected papers ==
- 1928 Stratigraphische und paläontologische Untersuchungen im unteren Gotlandium (Tamsal-Stufe) des westlichen Estland und der Insel Dagö: Neues Jahrbuch für Mineralogie, Geologie und Paläontologie, Beilage-Bd. 60, Abt. B, p. 1–112.
- 1933 Untersuchungen zum Bau des kaledonischen Gebirges in Ostgrönland: Meddelelser om Grønland, v. 95, no. 1, p. 1–121.
- 1937 Ordovician and Silurian faunas from Arctic Canada: Report of the Fifth Thule Expedition 1921–1924, v. 1, no. 5, p. 1–169.
- 1940 Actinosiphonate cephalopods (Cyrtoceroida) from the Devonian of Australia: Royal Society of Western Australia Journal, v. 26, no. 2, p. 59–75.
- 1940 (with Glaessner, M. F.) Geosynclines: A fundamental concept in geology: American Journal of Science, v. 245, pt. 1, p. 465–482.
- 1947 Stratigraphy of Western Australia: American Association of Petroleum Geologists Bulletin, v. 31, no. 1, p. 1–70.
- 1953 (and Glenister, B. F.) Ordovician and Silurian cephalopods from Tasmania, Australia: Bulletins of American Paleontology, v. 34, no. 144, p. 187–248.
- 1953 Cold and deep-water coral banks: American Association of Petroleum Geologists Bulletin, v. 42, no. 5, p. 1064–1082.
- 1958 Some biostratigraphical concepts: Geological Society of America Bulletin, v. 69, no. 1, p. 99–119.
- 1959 Australia and Gondwanaland: Geologische Rundschau, v. 47, no. 2, p. 562–590.
- 1963 (with Dunkel, D. H., and Rahman, H.) Stratigraphic research as applied to mineral resources development and exploration in Pakistan: U.S. Papers prepared for U.N. Conference on Application of Science and Technology for the Benefit of Less Developed Areas, v. 2, Natural Resources, p. 173–182.
- 1964 Mollusca 3: New York, and Lawrence, Kansas, Geological Society of America and University of Kansas Press, Treatise on Invertebrate Paleontology, Part K.
- 1965 Devonian rocks and paleogeography of central Arizona: U.S. Geological Survey Professional Paper 464, 181 p.
- 1966 Nomenclature and correlation of the Permian “Productus Limestone,” Salt Range, West Pakistan: Geological Survey of Pakistan Records, v. 15, 20 p.
- 1970 (with Kümmel, B.) Stratigraphy and paleontology of the Permian-Triassic boundary beds, Salt Range and Trans-Indus ranges, West Pakistan: Earth's pre-Pleistocene glacial record, in Kümmel, B., and Teichert, C., eds., Stratigraphic boundary problems: Permian and Triassic of West Pakistan: Lawrence, University of Kansas, Department of Geology, Special Publications, no. 4, p. 1–110.
- 1971 (with Meyerhoff, A. A.) Continental drift, III: Late Paleozoic glacial centers, and Devonian-Eocene coal distribution: Journal of Geology, v. 79, no. 3, p. 285–321.
- 1976 From Karpinsky to Schindewolf—Memories of some great paleontologists: Journal of Paleontology, v. 50, no. 1, p. 1–12.
- 1978 (with Saunders, W. B., Spinosa, C., and Banks, R. C.) The jaw apparatus of Recent Nautilus and its palaeontological implications: Palaeontology, v. 21, part 1, p. 129–141.
- 1981 Permian glaciation in the Salt Range, Pakistan, in Harland, W. B., and Hambrey, M. J., eds., Earth’s Pre-Pleistocene glacial record: Cambridge, UK, Cambridge University Press, p. 278–286.
- 1981 (with Chen, Jun-yuan) Cambrian Cephalopoda of China: Palaeontographica, v. 181, Abt. A, 102 p.
- 1983 (with Chen Yun-yuan, Zhou Zhi-yi, Lin Yao Kun, Wang Zhi-hao, and Xu Jun-tao) Faunal sequence across the Cambrian-Ordovician boundary in Northern China and its international correlation: Geologica et Palaeontologica, v. 17, p. 1–15.
- 1986 (and Yochelson, E. L.) The International Palaeontological Association: Historical perspective: Episodes, v. 8, no. 4, p. 252–256.
- 1988 Main features of cephalopod evolution, in Clarke, M. R., and Trueman, E. R., eds., The Mollusca, Volume 12: New York, Academic Press, p. 11–79.
- 1990 The Permian-Triassic boundary revisited, in Kauffman E.G., and Walliser O.H., eds., Extinction events in Earth history: Lecture Notes in Earth Sciences, v. 30, p. 199–238.
- 1991 "A Geological Expedition to East Greenland 1931–1932": Earth Sciences History, v. 10, no. 2, p. 259–273.
