= Albrecht Schröter =

German politician

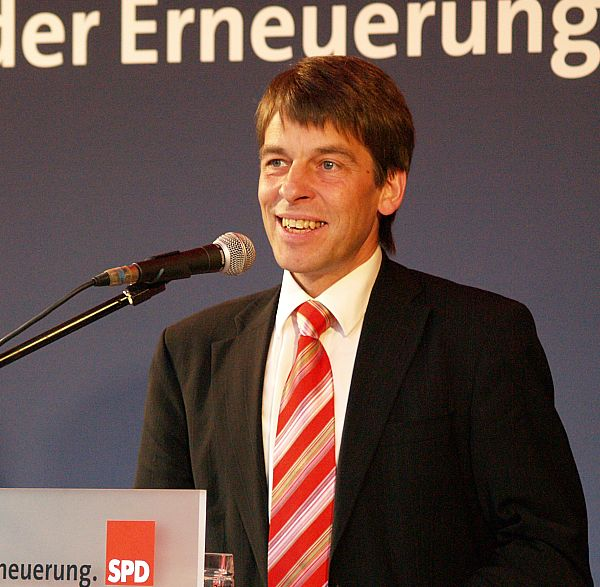
- Schröter in 2006

Mayor of Jena
- In office 1 July 2006 – 30 June 2018
- Preceded by: Peter Röhlinger
- Succeeded by: Thomas Nitzsche

Personal details
- Born: 7 April 1955 (age 71) Halle, East Germany
- Party: Social Democratic Party of Germany (SPD)
- Education: University of Halle-Wittenberg
- Website: https://www.albrecht-schroeter.de/

Albrecht Schröter (born 7 April 1955) is a German politician of the Social Democratic Party of Germany (SPD) who served as mayor (Oberbürgermeister) of Jena from 2006 to 2018.

== Early life and career ==
Schröter attended the Polytechnic Secondary School from 1962 to 1972, but was denied an Abitur for political reasons. After leaving school, he completed 2 1/2 years of training as a nurse (Krankenpfleger) in Eberswalde and in Bad Freienwalde. He then studied and received a degree in Protestant theology at the Martin Luther University of Halle-Wittenberg.

After graduating in 1980, he worked as a research assistant at the theology section and as vicar of evangelical youth work until 1984, when we took over a parish in Jena (first at the Friedenskirche and from 1986 to 1997 in the Luthersprengel). In 1985 he founded the "Jena Judaism Working Group" to document the history of the Jews of Jena and maintain the memory of the Holocaust. In 1996 he took his doctorate in theology in Halle-Wittenberg (summa cum laude). From 1997 he worked as a representative of the Free State of Thuringia for new religious movements and special communities and as a subject specialist at the Thuringian Institute for Teacher Training, Curriculum Development and Media (ThILLM) in Bad Berka.

== Political career ==
During the time of the GDR, Schröter involvement was concentrated on church youth work. On 1 October 1989 he co-founded the Democratic Awakening (Demokratischer Aufbruch, DA) in Berlin and was their spokesman in Jena. However he left the party in March 1990 as a consequence of the results of the parliamentary elections and the merger of the DA, DSU and CDU. Until his resignation in March 1990, Schröter was the personal in charge of the "round table" in Jena for planning health care reform.

In October 1990, Schröter joined the SDP, later the SPD. From 1990 to 1994 he was a member of the Jena city council and deputy chairman of the SPD parliamentary group. From 1998 to 2004 he was chairman of the Jena SPD. From 2004 to 2018 he was a member of the Regional Executive of the SPD in Thuringia. In May 2000, he was defeated in the run-off elections for mayor by the incumbent Peter Röhlinger with 47.2%. From September 2000 to June 2006 he was head of the Department for Social Affairs and Culture of the City of Jena. In 2001 he founded the Cultural Foundation Jena, which he continues to chair.

On 21 May 2006, Schröter was elected Mayor of the City of Jena with a run-off vote of 54.4%. He assumed office on 1 July 2006.

In 2010, Schröter became a member of the Presidium of the Association of German Cities. On 6 May 2012, he was re-elected with a run-off vote of 72.8%

On 3 February 2015, Schröter placed 6th out of 121 mayors from around the world in an internet poll for the title "World Mayor". The British-based City Mayors Foundation awards the title "World Mayor" every two years in order to honour the achievements of mayors.

In the 2018 election, he entered the second ballot on 29 April 2018, which he lost to FDP candidate Thomas Nitzsche. His term ended on 30 June 2018.

== Political positions ==
Schröter is a committed opponent of far-right politics. In 2009 he launched the "Communities against Right-wing Extremism" (Kommunen gegen Rechtsextremismus), establishing a network of medium German communities in the fight against neo-Nazis and offering mutual support countering Nazi rallies. On 17 November 2011, Albrecht Schröter received an award for "civil courage against right-wing extremism, anti-Semitism and racism". The Memorial to the Murdered Jews of Europe in Berlin honoured the commitment of the city of Jena against contemporary right-wing extremism.

=== Controversy ===
In September 2015, Schröter gained attention after offering an opinion on the Middle East Conflict attention by accusing Israel of partial responsibility for the Syrian refugee crisis and calling on the German foreign minister to "show less restraint" toward the Jewish state. He was then accused of Volksverhetzung ("incitement to hatred", a crime under the German criminal law) by Andreas Neumann, member of a Messianic Jewish congregation from Bavaria. The criminal prosecutor from Gera who investigated the charge announced that it would not be acted upon. The Student Council of the University of Jena passed resolutions defending Schröter against accusations of individuals from the faculty and apologized for the accusation made against him of anti-Semitism.

== Other activities ==
- Cultural Foundation of the Free State of Thuringia, Member of the Board of Trustees
- Institute for Energy Law, University of Jena, Member of the Board of Trustees
- Helaba, Member of the Advisory Board (2012-2013)

== Personal life ==
Schröter has married three times and has five children and two grandchildren. He is a descendant of Dorothea Sophie Michaelsen (née Händel) (1687–1720), a sister of George Frideric Handel.

| Preceded by Peter Röhlinger | Mayor of Jena; 2006 – 2018 | Succeeded by Thomas Nitzsche |
