= Gera – Jena – Saale-Holzland-Kreis =

Federal electoral district of Germany

Location of constituency in Thuringia

Gera – Jena – Saale-Holzland-Kreis was one of the 299 single member constituencies used for the German parliament, the Bundestag. One of nine districts covering the state of Thuringia, it covered the cities of Gera and Jena and the Saale-Holzland district.

The constituency was created for the 2005 election, expanding the Gera – Saale-Holzland-Kreis constituency by adding the city of Jena from the abolished Jena – Weimar – Weimarer Land constituency. Both the predecessor constituencies, which had been created for the 2002 election, had been won by the Social Democratic Party of Germany (SPD), and they won the new constituency in the 2005 election. However at the 2009 election the constituency was one of two in Thuringia gained by The Left and in 2013 it was one of all nine in the state won by the Christian Democratic Union (CDU). The last representative was Albert Weiler. For the 2017 election, the constituency was dissolved and not replaced. The area was assigned to neighboring constituencies. Gera went to Gera – Greiz – Altenburger Land, Jena to Jena – Sömmerda – Weimarer Land I and the Saale-Holzland district to Saalfeld-Rudolstadt – Saale-Holzland-Kreis – Saale-Orla-Kreis.

== Results ==
=== 2013 election ===
Party	Constituency results				List results		
Party	Candidate	Votes	% share	+/-	Votes	% share	+/-
Christian Democratic Union	Albert Weiler	59,731	36.1	+7.4	57,690	34.8	+7.2
The Left	Ralph Lenkert	44,657	27.0	-3.4	42,367	25.6	-4.3
Social Democratic Party of Germany	Volker Blumentritt	30,310	18.3	-3.0	26,279	15.9	-1.3
Alliance '90/The Greens	Olaf Müller	7,863	4.8	-2.3	11,435	6.9	-1.2
Alternative for Germany	Michael Heinz Kaufmann	9,126	5.5	N/A	10,988	6.6	N/A
Pirate Party	Gerald Albe	3,958	2.4	N/A	4,669	2.8	-0.6
Free Democratic Party	Thomas Nitzsche	2,755	1.7	-8.0	4,653	2.8	-7.5
National Democratic Party of Germany	Gordon Richter	4,225	2.6	-0.4	4,365	2.6	-0.1
Free Voters	Claudia Scholz	1,356	0.8	N/A	1,499	0.9	N/A
Ecological Democratic Party	Merlyn von Hugo	1,189	0.7	N/A	1,093	0.7	-0.3
Party of Reason	Jörg Brechlin	351	0.2	N/A	N/A	N/A	N/A
The Republicans	N/A	N/A	N/A	N/A	300	0.2	-0.2
Marxist–Leninist Party of Germany	N/A	N/A	N/A	N/A	241	0.1	-0.0
