= Alfred Schreiber =

- Born: 11 November 1923; Neplachovice, Czechoslovakia
- Died: 26 November 1944 (aged 21); Lechfeld Air Base, Bavaria, Germany
- Military career
- Allegiance: Weimar Republic; Nazi Germany
- Branch: Reichsheer; Luftwaffe
- Service years: 1932-1945
- Rank: Leutnant
- Conflicts: World War II

Alfred Schreiber (11 November 1923 – 26 November 1944) was a fighter pilot in the Luftwaffe during World War II. He is noted for claiming the first aerial victory by a jet fighter in aviation history.

== Biography ==
Schreiber was born on 11 November 1923 in Neplachovice. On 26 July 1944, Schreiber, a former Zerstörergeschwader 26 pilot, intercepted and attacked a Mosquito PR XVI, a photo-reconnaissance aircraft from No. 540 Squadron RAF, while flying Messerschmitt Me 262 A-1a W.Nr. 130 017. Upon returning to base, he claimed the first aerial victory by a jet fighter in aviation history. The front hatch had come off the Mosquito, hitting its wing and tail. It managed to return to an Allied held airfield in Italy where it was lost in the crash landing. Schreiber was credited with a further four aerial victories before being killed on 26 November 1944, making him the first jet ace in history. Schreiber was killed in a crash landing at Lechfeld. His aircraft wheels caught the lip of a slit trench, causing his Me 262 to cartwheel.

== Claims ==
Schreiber submitted the following claims:

Number	Date	Type
1	26 July 1944	No. 540 Squadron Royal Air Force Mosquito PR XVI
2	2 August 1944	Supermarine Spitfire
3	26 August 1944	Supermarine Spitfire
4	5 September 1944	Spitfire PR XI of the USAAF 7th Photographic Reconnaissance Group
5	28 October 1944	P-38 Lightning F-5E-3-LO of 7th PRG / 22nd PRS piloted by 2nd Lieutenant Eugene Selzer Williams (POW)
