= Albert Weiler =

German politician

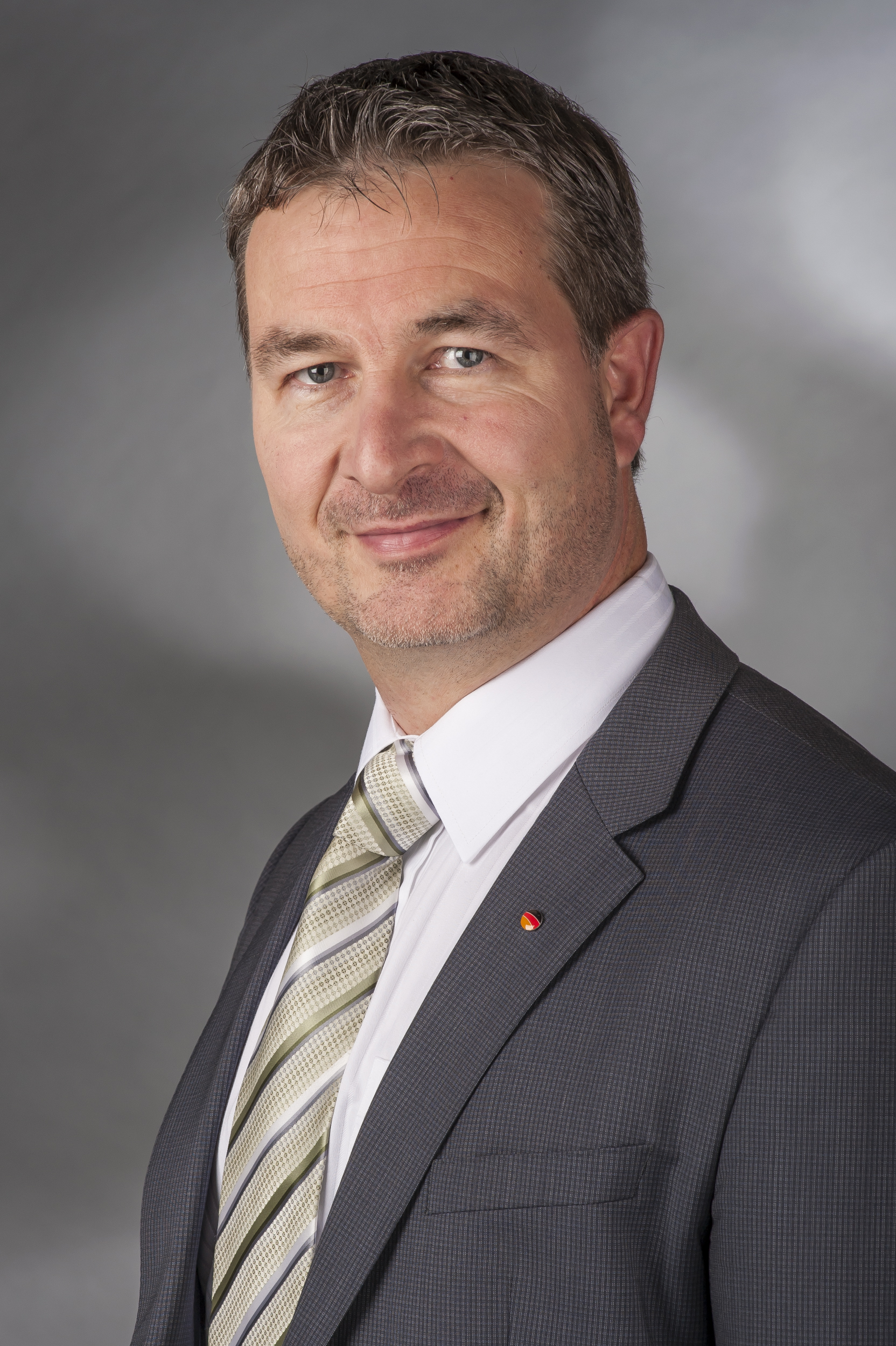

Member of the Bundestag
- In office 2013–2021
- Succeeded by: Michael Kaufmann
- Constituency: Saalfeld-Rudolstadt – Saale-Holzland-Kreis – Saale-Orla-Kreis

Personal details
- Born: 15 October 1965 (age 60) Mayen, West Germany (now Germany)
- Citizenship: German
- Party: CDU

Video introduction (in German)

Albert Helmut Weiler (born October 15, 1965 in Mayen) is a German politician of the Christian Democratic Union (CDU) who served as a member of the German Bundestag from 2013 until 2021.

== Early life and education ==
From 1982 to 1984, Weiler trained as an electrician and in 1986 as an energy plant electrician. In 1990 in Cologne he earned his Abitur with distinction at night school. He studied from 1992 to 1995 at the University of Applied Sciences for Public Administration in Brühl in the Rhineland. In 1995 he graduated with a diploma in public administration (Diplom-Verwaltungswirt). From 1996 to 2002 he studied for a business administration (REFA-Betriebswirt) with a focus on productivity improvement and process optimization at the REFA-Institut Darmstadt / Dortmund. In 1997 he trained in labour, tariff classification and legislation at the Pedagogical Institute for the Economy in Bebra.

Alongside his job at the Thuringian Institute for Curriculum Development, Teacher Training and Media (ThILLM), Weiler pursued studies from 2007 to 2009 at the Free University of Berlin, earning a master's degree in public policy. Before becoming a member of parliament in 2013, Weiler was the head of the community administration "Bergbahnregion/Schwarzatal" in Oberweißbach.

== Political career ==
In 2003, Weiler became deputy chairman of the local CDU chapter for "Gebirge/Milda" and became chairman in 2010. Since 2004 he has been the honorary mayor of Milda and since 2014 a member of the district council for Saale-Holzland-Kreis.

In the 2013 federal election, Weiler won the direct mandate for the CDU in the constituency Gera – Jena – Saale-Holzland-Kreis. He was a full member of the Committee for Labour and Social Affairs, where he served as his parliamentary group's rapporteur on unemployment insurance and public employment agencies, including the German Federal Employment Agency (BA). In addition, he served as substitute member of the Committee on Economic Affairs and Energy, substitute member of the Committee on Human Rights and Humanitarian Affairs and substitute member of the Parliamentary Advisory Board on Sustainability.

In addition to his committee assignments, Weiler served as deputy chairman of the Parliamentary Friendship Group for Relations with the States of the Southern Caucasus (2018–2021) and as member of the Parliamentary Friendship Group for Relations with the SADC States (2013-2017).

In 2017, he became MdB for Saalfeld-Rudolstadt – Saale-Holzland-Kreis – Saale-Orla-Kreis. In the 2021 German federal election, he lost his seat to Michael Kaufmann from the AfD.

== Other activities ==
=== Corporate boards ===
- Thüringer Energie AG, Member of the Advisory Board (-2015)
- Thüga AG, Member of the Advisory Board (-2015)

=== Non-profit organizations ===
- German-Armenian Forum, President

== Recognition ==
- 2016 — Honorary doctorate, National University of Architecture and Construction of Armenia (NUACA)
