= Volker Blumentritt =

German politician (born 1946)

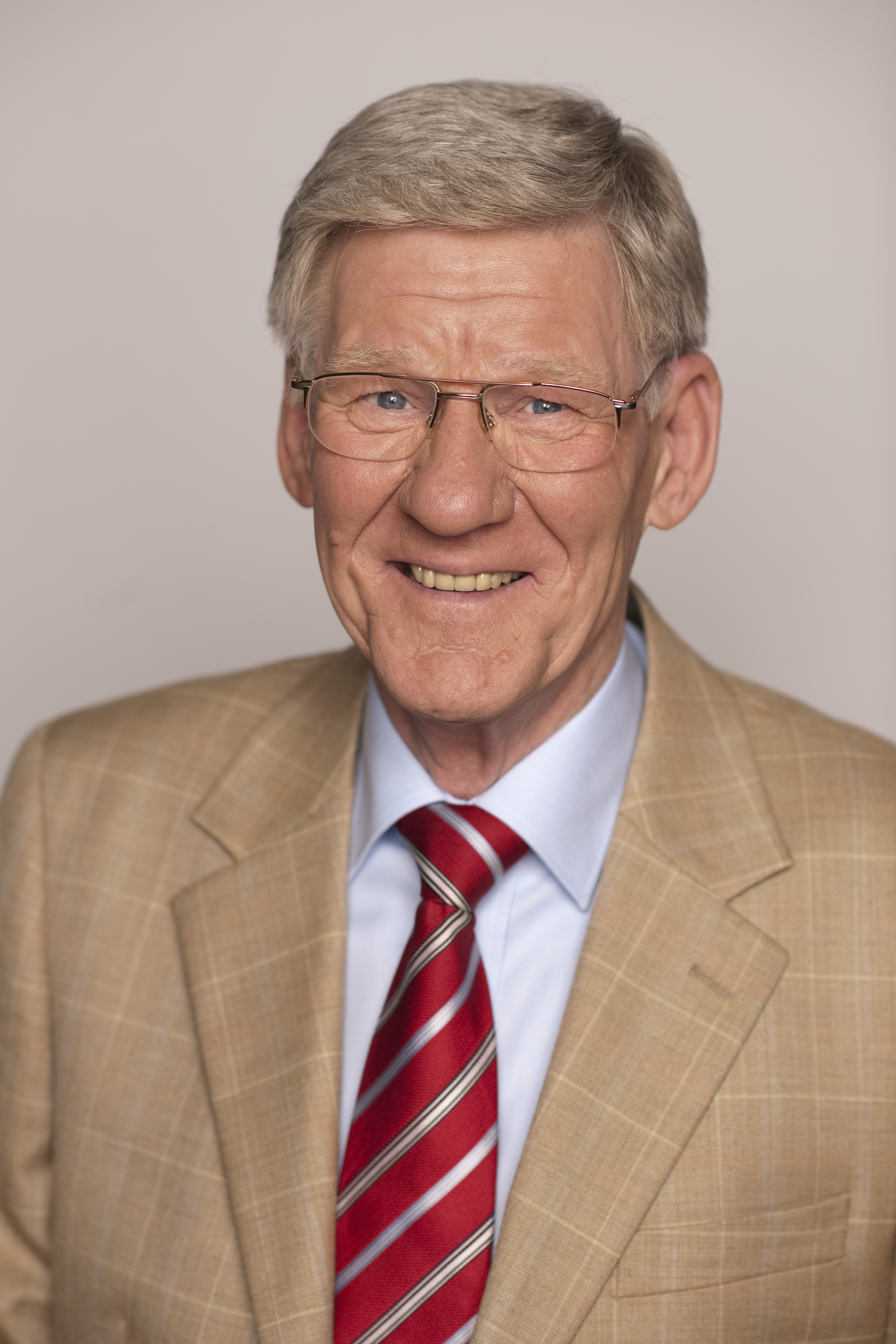
Volker Blumentritt (2013)

Volker Blumentritt (born 16 June 1946 in Jena) is a German politician and member of the SPD.

From 2005 until 2009, Blumentritt was a member of the Bundestag representing Gera – Saale-Holzland-Kreis. At the 2009 election his constituency was expanded following boundary changes to become Gera – Jena – Saale-Holzland-Kreis, which he unsuccessfully contested.

== Early life ==
After attending the Polytechnic Secondary School, Blumentritt completed an apprenticeship as a chef from 1963 to 1966 and then did his military service until 1969. Afterwards he worked from 1974 at Mitropa. From 1990 to 2003 he was chairman of the works council of Mitropa AG at the Gera site and a member of the central works council (German: Gesamtbetriebsrat).

Volker Blumentritt is married, lives separated and has two children.
