= Michael Kaufmann (politician) =

German politician (born 1964)

Michael Kaufmann MdB

Member of the Bundestag for Saalfeld-Rudolstadt – Saale-Holzland-Kreis – Saale-Orla-Kreis
- Incumbent
- Assumed office 26 October 2021
- Preceded by: Albert Weiler

Vice President of the Landtag of Thuringia
- In office 5 March 2020 – 5 November 2021
- President: Birgit Pommer

Personal details
- Born: 21 April 1964 (age 62) Gera, East Germany
- Party: AfD
- Children: 2

Michael Heinz Kaufmann (born 21 April 1964) is a German politician from the AfD. He has been Member of the German Bundestag for Saalfeld-Rudolstadt – Saale-Holzland-Kreis – Saale-Orla-Kreis since 2021.

== Early life ==
Kaufmann was born in Gera.

== Political career ==
Kaufmann was elected to the Landtag of Thuringia in 2019. On 5 March 2020 he was elected vice president of the Landtag with the narrowest possible majority, marking the first time the Thuringian AfD faction held this office. In the 2021 German federal election he defeated CDU incumbent Albert Weiler. Consequently, on 5 November 2021 Kaufmann resigned as member of the Landtag of Thuringia. Kaufmann was re-elected in the 2025 German federal election by keeping his direct mandate.

== See also ==
- List of members of the 20th Bundestag
