= Myron Kaufmann =

American novelist

Myron Kaufmann (August 27, 1921 – January 29, 2010) was an American novelist best remembered for his popular 1957 novel, Remember Me to God.

Josh Lambert writes that Remember Me To God was "hailed on publication as one of the finest novels ever written about American Jews and remained on the New York Times bestseller list for an entire year, almost no one remembers it today." Kaufmann's second novel, Thy Daughter's Nakedness, appeared in 1968, and when his third, The Love of Elspeth Baker was published in 1982, the New York Times called him "a man who takes his time." The later novels did not live up to the promise of the first.

== Early life ==
Kaufmann was raised in Belmont, Massachusetts. As a boy, he composed serial adventure stories to entertain his classmates. He was valedictorian of his Belmont High School graduating class. He attended Harvard University with a concentration in biochemistry. After graduating in 1943, he entered the U.S. Army where he was trained as a Japanese translator.

== Critical reception of "Remember Me to God" ==
Kaufmann's novel is set at Harvard. It deals with identity, assimilation, and the struggle of the son of Jewish immigrants to enter American society. At the time of his 25th Harvard reunion, he wrote:

"The existence of a vigorous orthodox Jewish community on the Harvard campus was inconceivable in our time. About two years ago I walked in on a group of Harvard students on an ordinary sabbath eve. As soon as ten were present, a service began. There followed a kosher dinner until someone began the grace-after-meals. After that psalms were sung in the original tongue. ... For the past few years Kosher TV dinners have been available in the House dining halls upon a surcharge of fifty cents ... how impossible it was twenty-five years ago for all this to exist—how impossible it was to believe it ever could exist. We had not the skill, we had not the knowledge. We had not the will."

Critic Louis Harap considers Remember Me To God to be "a memorable treatment of the problem" of Jewish identity and assimilation in America.

Today, the novel is perhaps as widely read by sociologists and historians of the American Jewish experience, as by literary critics. Sociologist Richard Alba writes:

"The second generation found a much more complex situation. Many of them believed they heard the siren call of welcome to the social cliques, clubs, and institutions of white Protestant America. After all, it was simply a matter of learning American ways, was it not, and had they not grown up as Americans and were they not culturally different from their parents, the greenhorns? Or perhaps an especially eager one reasoned, like the Jewish protagonist of Myron Kaufmann's novel, Remember Me to God, bucking for membership in the prestigious club system of Harvard undergraduate social life: If only I can go the last few steps in Ivy League manners and behavior, they will surely recognize that I am one of them and take me in. But, Brooks Brothers suit notwithstanding, the doors of the fraternity house, the city men's club, and the country club were slammed in the face of the immigrant's offspring ... And so the rebuffed one returned to the homelier but dependable comfort of the communal institutions of his ancestral group. There he found his fellows of the same generation who had never stirred from the home fires at all."

== Published works ==
- Remember Me to God (Lippincott, 1957)
- Thy Daughter's Nakedness (Lippincott, 1968)
- The Coming Destruction of Israel (Signet, 1970)
- The Love of Elspeth Baker (Arbor House, 1982)
