= Sarah Kofman =

French philosopher (1934–1994)

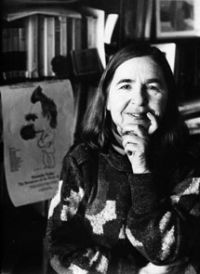
- Born: 14 September 1934; Paris, France
- Died: 15 October 1994 (aged 60); Paris, France

Education
- Education: University of Paris; École Normale Supérieure (no degree); Paris X Paris VIII
- Doctoral advisors: Gilles Deleuze; Mikel Dufrenne
- Other advisors: Jacques Derrida; Jean Hyppolite

Philosophical work
- Era: 20th-century philosophy
- Region: Western philosophy
- School: Continental philosophy French feminism Deconstruction
- Institutions: Paris I University of Geneva; University of California, Berkeley
- Main interests: Aesthetics
- Notable ideas: Nietzsche's concepts as condensed metaphors

Sarah Kofman (French: [kɔfman]; 14 September 1934 – 15 October 1994) was a French philosopher.

== Biography ==
Kofman began her teaching career in Toulouse in 1960 at the Lycée Saint-Sernin. She worked under the supervision of Jean Hyppolite, initially planning studies of Freud and art; Mikel Dufrenne, on Freud's aesthetics for her third-cycle doctoral thesis, published under the title The Childhood of Art; and then Gilles Deleuze, for her State doctorate based on published work. In 1969–69, Kofman met Jacques Derrida and began attending his seminars at the École Normale Supérieure.

Kofman did not receive tenure until 1991, when she was appointed to a chair at Paris I.

Kofman was the author of numerous books, including several on Friedrich Nietzsche and Sigmund Freud. Her book, L'énigme de la femme: La femme dans les textes de Freud (1980), is perhaps the most thorough consideration of Freud's ideas concerning female sexuality.

== Writings ==
Though many of her philosophical writings focused on Nietzsche and Freud, Kofman wrote several works in an autobiographical vein. Paroles suffoquées (1987) is dedicated to the memory of her father, rabbi Bereck Kofman, whom she saw for the last time on 16 July 1942, and who was killed at Auschwitz.

Rue Ordener, rue Labat (1994) also opens with the removal of her father by the French police, and describes what Kofman understands to have been his fate. The title refers to two Parisian streets: the address at which her family lived until her father's arrest; and the address at which she was sheltered for much of the remainder of the war. Kofman was taken in by a Parisian divorcée who became her surrogate mother and whom she called Mémé. The book tells the story of this period, and of the custody dispute between Mémé and Kofman's mother following the liberation of Paris.

== Death ==
Kofman committed suicide in 1994. She was survived by her partner of 25 years, Alexandre Kyritsos.

The fact that she died by suicide on the date of Nietzsche's 150th birthday has been seen by some writers as significant. After her death, Jacques Derrida wrote the following:

For she too was without pity, if not without mercy, in the end, for both Nietzsche and Freud, whom she knew and whose bodies of work she had read inside and out. Like no one else in this century, I dare say. She loved them pitilessly, and was implacable towards them (not to mention a few others) at the very moment when, giving them without mercy all that she could, and all that she had, she was inheriting from them and was keeping watch over what they had—what they still have—to tell us, especially regarding art and laughter.

== Bibliography ==
=== Books ===
- L'enfance de l'art: Une interprétation de l'esthétique freudienne (1970). Trans.: The Childhood of Art: An Interpretation of Freud's Aesthetics (1988).
- Nietzsche et la métaphore (1972). Trans.: Nietzsche and Metaphor (1993).
- Camera obscura: De l'idéologie (1973). Trans.: Camera Obscura: Of Ideology (1998).
- Quatre romans analytiques (1974). Trans.: Freud and Fiction (1991).
- Autobiogriffures (1976).
- Aberrations: Le devenir-femme d'Auguste Comte (1978).
- Nerval: Le charme de la répétition (1979).
- Nietzsche et la scène philosophique (1979).
- L'énigme de la femme: La femme dans les textes de Freud (1980). Trans.: The Enigma of Woman: Woman in Freud's Writings (1985).
- Le respect des femmes (Kant et Rousseau) (1982).
- Comment s'en sortir? (1983).
- Un métier impossible: Lecture de "Constructions en analyse" (1983).
- Lectures de Derrida (1984).
- Mélancholie de l'art (1985).
- Pourquoi rit-on? Freud et le mot d'esprit (1986).
- Paroles suffoquées (1987). Trans.: Smothered Words (1998).
- Conversions: Le Marchand de Venise sous le signe de Saturne (1987).
- Socrate(s) (1989). Trans.: Socrates: Fictions of a Philosopher (1998).
- Séductions: De Sartre à Héraclite (1990).
- Don Juan ou le refus de la dette (1991).
- "Il n'y a que le premier pas qui coûte": Freud et la spéculation (1991).
- Explosion I: De l'"Ecce Homo" de Nietzsche (1992).
- Explosion II: Les enfants de Nietzsche (1993).
- Le mépris des Juifs: Nietzsche, les Juifs, l'antisémitisme (1994).
- Rue Ordener, rue Labat (1994). Trans.: Rue Ordener, Rue Labat (1996).
- L'imposture de la beauté et autres textes (1995).
- Selected Writings (2007). Edited by Thomas Albrecht, Georgia Albert & Elizabeth G. Rottenberg; introduction by Jacques Derrida.

=== Articles ===
Note: this list does not include portions of books where a translation of the entire book was subsequently published.

- "No Longer Full-Fledged Autobiogriffies," SubStance 29 (1981): 3–22. From: Autobiogriffures (1976).
- "Sartre: Fort! Ou Da?", Diacritics 14, 4 (1984): 9–18.
- "Damned Food," SubStance 49 (1986): 8–9.
- "Tomb for a Proper Name," SubStance 49 (1986): 9–10.
- "Nightmare: At the Margins of Medieval Studies," SubStance 49 (1986): 10–13. From: Comment s'en sortir? (1983).
- "Prometheus, the First Philosopher," SubStance 50 (1986): 26–35. From: Comment s'en sortir? (1983).
- "Nietzsche and the Obscurity of Heraclitus," Diacritics 17, 3 (1987): 39–55. From: Séductions: De Sartre à Héraclite (1990).
- "Baubô: Theological Perversion and Fetishism," in Michael Allen Gillespie & Tracy B. Strong, Nietzsche's New Seas: Explorations in Philosophy, Aesthetics, and Politics (Chicago & London: University of Chicago Press, 1988). From: Nietzsche et la scène philosophique (1979).
- "Beyond Aporia?", in Andrew Benjamin (ed.), Post-structuralist Classics (London & New York: Routledge, 1988). From: Comment s'en sortir? (1983).
- "'Ça cloche'," in Hugh J. Silverman (ed.), Derrida and Deconstruction (New York & London: Routledge, 1989). From: Lectures de Derrida (1984). Originally delivered at the 1980 Cerisy colloquy, "Les fins de l'homme."
- "Conversions: The Merchant of Venice under the Sign of Saturn," in Peter Collier & Helga Geyer-Ryan (eds.), Literary Theory Today (Cambridge: Polity Press, 1990). From: Conversions: Le Marchand de Venise sous le signe de Saturne (1987).
- "Metaphoric Architectures," in Laurence A. Rickels (ed.), Looking After Nietzsche (Albany: State University of New York Press, 1990).
- "Descartes Entrapped," in Eduardo Cadava, Peter Connor, & Jean-Luc Nancy, Who Comes After the Subject? (New York & London: Routledge, 1991). From: Nietzsche et la scène philosophique (1979).
- "Rousseau's Phallocratic Ends," in Bartky, Sandra Lee; Fraser, Nancy (1992). Revaluing French feminism: critical essays on difference, agency, and culture. Bloomington: Indiana University Press. ISBN 9780253206824.
- "Explosion I: Of Nietzsche's Ecce Homo," Diacritics 24, 4 (1994): 50–70. From: Explosion I: De l'"Ecce Homo" de Nietzsche (1992).
- "A Fantastical Genealogy: Nietzsche's Family Romance," in Peter J. Burgard (ed.), Nietzsche and the Feminine (Charlottesville & London: University Press of Virginia, 1994). From: Explosion I: De l'"Ecce Homo" de Nietzsche (1992).
- "'It's Only the First Step That Costs'," in Sonu Shamdasani & Michael Münchow (eds.), Speculations After Freud: Psychoanalysis, Philosophy, Culture (London & New York: Routledge, 1994). From: "Il n'y a que le premier pas qui coûte": Freud et la spéculation (1991).
- "Wagner's Ascetic Ideal According to Nietzsche," in Richard Schacht (ed.), Nietzsche, Genealogy, Morality: Essays on Nietzsche's Genealogy of Morals (Berkeley: University of California Press, 1994).
- "The Psychologist of the Eternal Feminine (Why I Write Such Good Books, 5)," Yale French Studies 87 (1995): 173–89. From: Explosion II: Les enfants de Nietzsche (1993).
- "Accessories (Ecce Homo, 'Why I Write Such Good Books,' 'The Untimelies,' 3)," in Peter R. Sedgwick (ed.), Nietzsche: A Critical Reader (Oxford: Blackwell, 1995). From: Explosion II: Les enfants de Nietzsche (1993).
- "The Economy of Respect: Kant and Respect for Women," in Robin May Schott (ed.), Feminist Interpretations of Immanuel Kant (University Park, Penn.: Pennsylvania State University Press, 1997). From: Le respect des femmes (Kant et Rousseau) (1982).
- "The Imposture of Beauty: The Uncanniness of Oscar Wilde's Picture of Dorian Gray," in Penelope Deutscher & Kelly Oliver (eds.), Enigmas: Essays on Sarah Kofman (Ithaca & London: Cornell University Press, 1999). From: L'imposture de la beauté et autres textes (1995).

=== Interviews ===
- "Sarah Kofman," interview with Alice Jardine, in Alice Jardine & Anne M. Menke (eds.), Shifting Scenes: Interviews on Women, Writing, and Politics in Post-68 France (New York & Oxford: Columbia University Press, 1991).
- "Writing without Power: A Conversation with Sarah Kofman," interview with Ursula Konnertz, Women's Philosophy Review (June 1995): 5–8.

== See also ==
- List of thinkers influenced by deconstruction
