= Celina Kofman =

Argentine political activist (1924–2020)

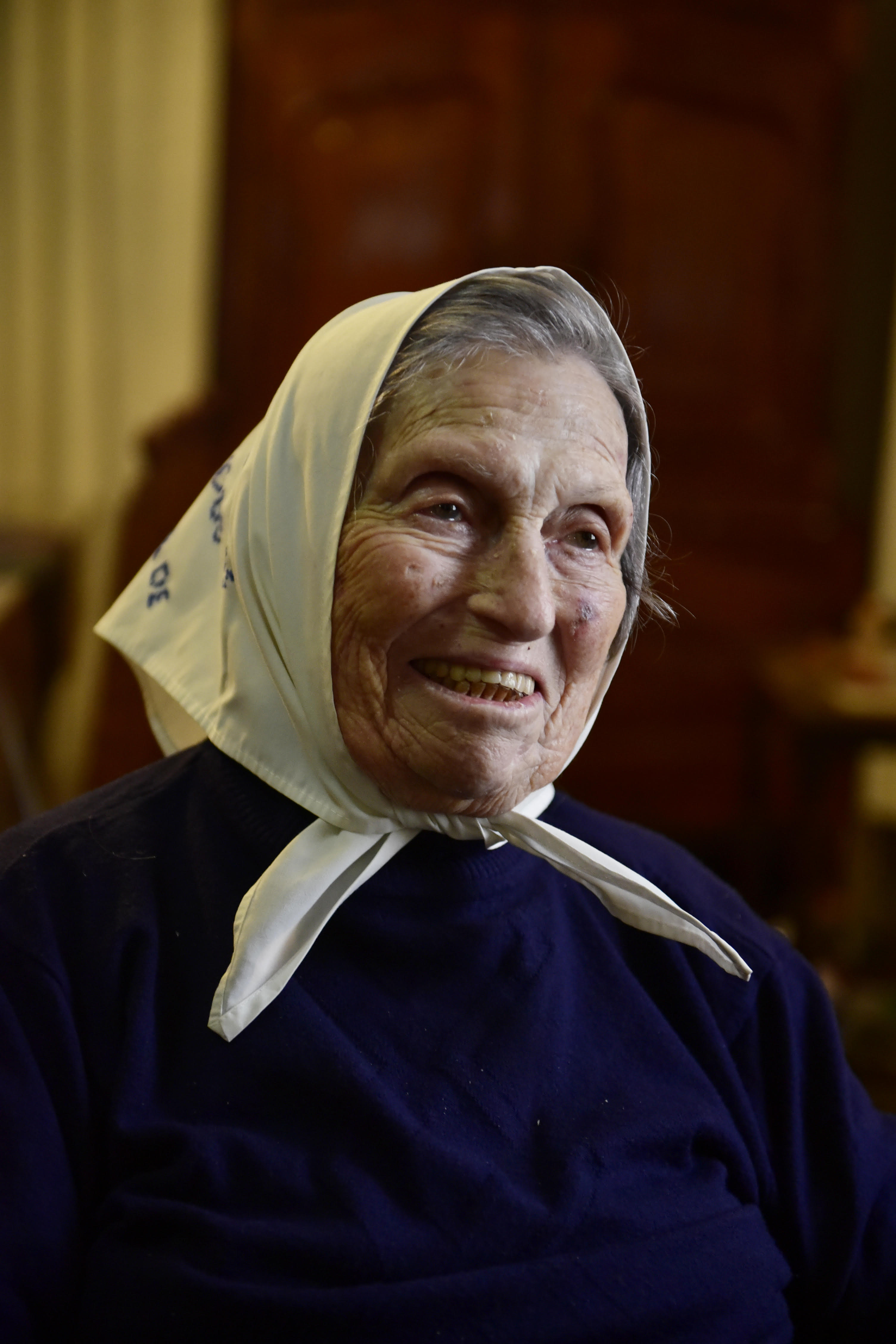
- Born: 1924; Villa Domínguez
- Died: 3 August 2020 (aged 95–96)
- Occupation: political activist

Celina Kofman (1924 – 3 August 2020) was an Argentine human rights activist. By profession, Celina Kofman was one of the important members of the organization that was launched in the 1970s in the midst of the National Reorganization Process, after her son was kidnapped. He was a member from 1978 to 2000, where he had responsibility for the former Concordia and Santa Fe subsidiaries.

== Life ==
Celina Kofman also known as "Queca" was born in Entre Ríos a town in Villa Domínguez in 1924. She dedicated her life to teaching, a profession that she practiced in the city of Concordia.

One of her sons was Jorge Oscar Kofman, a 23-year-old student and worker, the father of a child and another on the way, who was kidnapped and disappeared by murderous military men in Tucumán. He had already been detained during the so-called Argentine Revolution and was released when Héctor Cámpora took office on May 25, 1973. It is presumed that he was intercepted by a military patrol when he was traveling in a bus line from Tucumán to Córdoba on route 301. A lawyer who collaborated with his family was able to find out that he was injured in one knee, that he took refuge in the home of a family of peasants and, once restored, collaborated in cane harvesting tasks. Then they would have transferred him in a sulky to the route and began the trip to the province of Córdoba. It was the beginning of June 1975. After the kidnapping, Jorge was taken to the Famaillá School, the first clandestine detention center in the country, lodged with other illegal detainees and interrogated under torture. Between August and September, he was reportedly transferred to the Villa Urquiza prison and confined in a pavilion that at that time was intended for political prisoners (then later apparently murdered from there and his body later disappeared in the death flights which were flights that took captive activists, activists, disarmed militants, etc. and dropped them drugged to a watery death).3

Over time Celina became the Santa Fe reference of the Mothers of Plaza de Mayo whose marches had the support of great figures such as that of Alicia Moreau de Justo. She organized the families of the victims of the dictatorship, from the Assembly Permanent for Human Rights (APDH), family associations and then from Mothers of Plaza de Mayo.

In 2001 she retired from the Mothers' organization due to some disagreements with some members of the institution, among them Hebe de Bonafini. In this regard, she used to say:

"I no longer belong to the organization but all my life I will be a Mother of Plaza de Mayo. For this reason, I continue to wear the scarf. We in the interior of the country do not handle a single peso." 5 In 2008, she gave her strong opinion on the situation of hunger and children in Argentina:

"In this country where food is abundant, where there is so much talk about the distribution of wealth and where 25 children die of hunger and malnutrition per day; children march so that governments can see them and be aware." "They are our children, it is our responsibility and moral duty to demand that the authorities end this." 6 In 2010 she asked for a call for a public trial for some journalists who collaborated with the past military dictatorship.

In 2013, it was news when her house located in the province of Santa Fe, Argentina, was attacked with offensive graffiti on the day that the Mothers celebrated the 36th anniversary of their first wheel. Fact that was repudiated by the Provincial Directive Council Association of State Workers (ATSA). In that same year, the Mothers of the Plaza de Mayo were honored by SADOP at the Solar de las Artes, for International Women's Day.7

Her other son, Hugo Alberto Kofman, presented a book titled Look at the Earth until you find yourself, which recounts the vicissitudes of the investigation that allowed in 2010 to find the remains of eight popular militants in a mass grave in the San Pedro Military Camp in the province of Santa Fe. 8 Kofman died on 3 August 2020.
