= Bereck Kofman =

French rabbi

Bereck Kofman (10 October 1900 – 1943) was a French Hasidic orthodox rabbi, independent from the consistory, born in Poland, deported and murdered in Auschwitz.

Rabbi Bereck Kofman was born in Sobienie-Jeziory, located about 40 kilometers south of Warsaw, on 10 October 1900.

Bereck Kofman was the father of a family of six children, three sons and three daughters, including the future professor of philosophy at the Sorbonne, Sarah Kofman. The family settled in France in 1929 where they were granted French citizenship.

On 16 July 1942 Kofman was arrested by the Vichy police during the rafle du Vélodrome d'Hiver, together with about 13,000 other Jews, and moved to Drancy internment camp to wait for deportation. According to his daughter Sarah, her father heard about the roundup through rumours and had left his residence very early to warn the other Jews of the danger, before returning home, ready to sacrifice himself for his family. He was arrested at four in the afternoon. His family, who never saw him again, received a postcard, written by someone else, from the camp at Drancy. He was deported to Auschwitz by the Convoi (Convoy) No 12 on 29 July 1942. After the war, a death certificate was sent from Auschwitz. According to the testimony of a survivor from Auschwitz during this time, Rabbi Kofman was at the camp for one year before his murder by a Kapo on a Shabbat because he refused to work. He was beaten up with a pickax and buried alive. The perpetrator of the crime, a Jewish butcher, returned from deportation and reopened his shop, Rue des Rosiers, in the Pletzl.

Sarah Kofman has remarked that the only souvenir remaining from her father is a fountain pen and that this was the source of all her writings.

== Bibliography ==
- Serge Klarsfeld. Le Mémorial De La Déportation Des Juifs De France. Beate et Serge Klarsfeld: Paris, 1978
- Sarah Kofman. Rue Ordener. Rue Labat. Translated with an introduction by Ann Smock. University of Nebraska Press: Lincoln & London, 1996. ISBN 0-8032-7780-6
- Jacques Derrida. The Work of Mourning. University of Chicago Press: Chicago & London, 2001. (Derrida mentions the death of Sarah Kofman, p. 173)
