= Rudolf Kaufmann =

German paleontologist

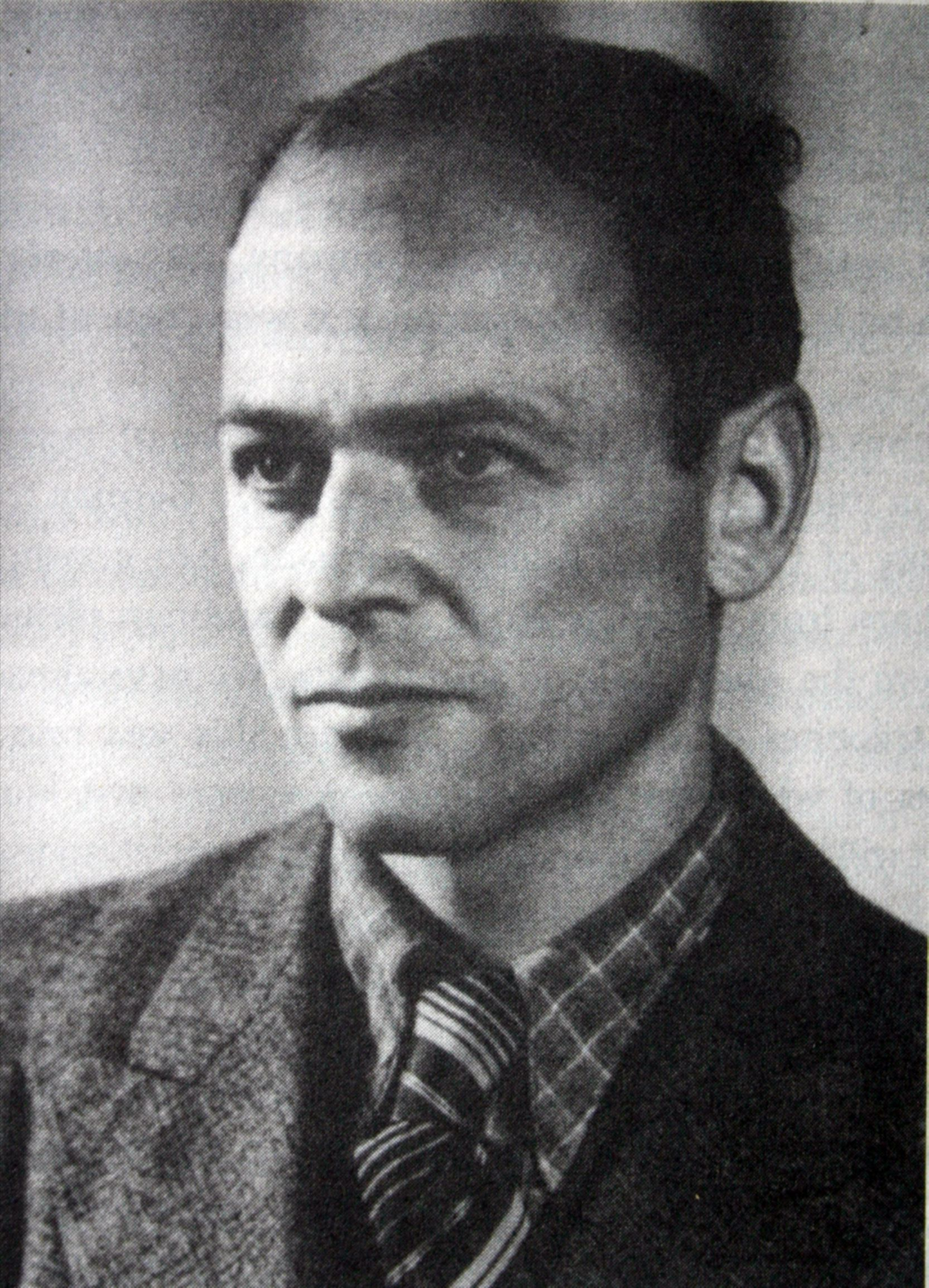
- Born: 3 April 1909; Königsberg
- Died: Summer 1941 (aged 32); German-occupied Lithuania
- Cause of death: Murder by two soldiers
- Education: Königsberg, Greifswald University
- Known for: Allopatric speciation and punctuated equilibrium trilobites
- Father: Walter Kaufmann
- Relatives: Curt Teichert (brother-in-law)
- Scientific career
- Fields: Palaeontology, geology
- Workplaces: Greifswald University
- Academic advisors: Serge von Bubnoff

Rudolf Kaufmann (3 April 1909 – c. 1941), son of the physicist Walter Kaufmann, was a palaeontologist and geologist, and is best remembered for his work on allopatric speciation and punctuated equilibrium in the trilobite genus Olenus in the Upper Cambrian of Sweden and on the island of Bornholm. He was a brother-in-law of Curt Teichert, the well-known German-American palaeontologist and geologist. Studying the Upper Cambrian alum shales in Sweden, Kaufmann found that the trilobite genus Olenus occurred in an unbroken sequence of sediments covering a considerable period of geological time. He was thereby in a position to track the phylogenetic evolution of Olenus, that is, the rise and fall of species within the genus and the changes in their morphology. He coined the idea of Artabwandlung, which is the tendency of clade elements in the same environment to show the same morphological trends.

With the 1930s onset of the Nazi regime in Germany, Kaufmann, who was a Jew, was dismissed from his position at Greifswald University. He had studied at Königsberg and at Greifswald University under Serge von Bubnoff (1888–1957). His 1933 dissertation dealt with speciation and punctuated equilibrium in Cambrian trilobites in Skåne.

He left Germany for Copenhagen in 1933. Here, he was denied employment as a geologist, and so, he worked as a photographer and gave instruction in athletics. He found himself ill at ease in Denmark, and after a spell in Italy, he returned to Germany, where, in October 1935, he started teaching at a Jewish school in Coburg, and was arrested on a charge of "Rassenschande" (he was being treated for a sexually transmitted disease acquired from an affair with an "Aryan" woman). In 1936, he was sentenced to 3 years of hard labour. On his release in 1939, Kaufmann fled to Lithuania, where he was allowed to settle and resume geological work. When Lithuania became part of the U.S.S.R. in 1940, he joined the staff of the Geological Survey at Kaunas, immersing himself in the problems of Pleistocene drift, and marrying a fellow refugee. After the German occupation of Lithuania in 1941, and now an "undesirable Jew", he was identified while cycling on a country road and murdered by two German soldiers.

Earlier, in his search for work, he had moved to Italy and found work in a photographic shop in Bologna. There, in the summer of 1935, he met Ingeborg Magnusson, a 28-year-old Swedish woman on holiday. This relationship was to last five years, during which period they spent 13 days together - he visited her once in Stockholm, and she saw him once in Germany. These details came to light in 1991, when a German stamp collector bought a package of 30 letters, written by Kaufmann to Ingeborg, at a Frankfurt stamp auction.

== Some Publications ==
- Die Klufttektonik des Kambrosilurs von Gotland, Oeland und dem Kalmargebiet. Geol. Rundschau, vol. 22, pp. 292–306. 1931.
- Ueber Jurageschiebe aus Ostpreussen. Zeitsch. f. Geschiebeforsch., vol. 8, pp. 73–75. 1932.
- Variationsstatistische Untersuchungen über die "Artabwandlung" und "Artumbildung" an der Oberkambrischen Trilobitengattung Olenus DALM. Abb. Geol.-Pal. Inst. Univ. Greifswald, Heft X. 1933. pp. 1–54.
- Die Einstufung der Olenus-Arten von Bornholm. Palaeont. Zeitsch., vol. 15, pp. 57–63. 1933.
- Exakt nachgewiesene Stammesgeschichte. Die Naturwissenschaften, vol. 22, pp. 803–807. 1933.
- Exakt-statistische Biostratigraphie der Olenus-Arten von Südöland. Geol. Foren. Stockholm Forhandl., 1935, pp. 19–28.
- Zur Tektonik des Grundgebirges von Bornholm. Geol. Rundschau, vol. 24, pp. 379–389. 1935.

== Bibliography ==
Paper Kisses - Reinhard Kaiser ISBN 1-59051-181-6 (Other Press, 2006)
