= Hilde Kaufmann =

German jurist

Hilde Kaufmann (born 28 October 1920 in Werne; died 11 January 1981 in Cologne) was a German jurist and criminologist. From 1966 to 1970, she was a professor at the University of Kiel, then from 1970 until her death a professor and director of the Criminological Research Center at the University of Cologne. Her main scientific subject was the orientation of criminology to the needs of criminal science and criminal justice.
