= Eugen Kaufmann =

German architect

- Born: 8 January 1892; Frankfurt am Main
- Died: 21 June 1984 (aged 92); London, England
- Other names: Eugene Charles Kent
- Occupation: architect
- Known for: city planning
- Notable work: New Frankfurt project

Eugen Carl Kaufmann or Eugene Charles Kent (8 January 1892 – 21 June 1984) was a German architect.

== Early life ==
Kaufmann was born 8 January 1892 in Frankfurt am Main. He trained as an architect and planner at the Technischen Hochschule in Berlin from 1910 to 1912 and the Technischen Hochschule in Munich from 1912 to 1914.

From 1925, he was engaged at the New Frankfurt project under the leadership of Ernst May. From 1931 to 1933 he worked as an architect in Kharkhov and Moscow.

== In London ==
Kaufmann moved to London and became a naturalized citizen on 28 June 1939. He opened his own architectural office there.

He died on 21 June 1984 in London.
