= Andreas Kaufmann =

German footballer

Personal information
- Date of birth: 6 October 1973 (age 53)
- Height: 1.80 m (5 ft 11 in)
- Position: Defender

Youth career
- DJK Konstanz

Senior career*
Years	Team	Apps	(Gls)
–2001	FC Konstanz		
2001–2008	SC Freiburg II		
2001–2002	SC Freiburg	3	(0)
2005–2006	SC Freiburg	2	(0)
- * Club domestic league appearances and goals

Andreas Kaufmann (born 6 October 1973) is a German former professional footballer who played as a defender. He made his debut on the professional league level in the Bundesliga with SC Freiburg on 22 September 2001 when he came on as a substitute in the 90th minute of a game against Schalke 04.
