= Julia Kaufmann =

German voice actress

Julia Kaufmann is a German voice actress. She has dubbed over a number of actresses, including Scarlett Johansson, Mischa Barton, and Elisha Cuthbert.

== Dubbing roles ==
=== Television animation ===
- Avatar: The Last Airbender (Katara (Mae Whitman) (seasons 1 & 2 & opening narration))
- Earth Maiden Arjuna (Jiyuna Ariyoshi (Mami Higashiyama))
- Elfen Lied (Yuka (Mamiko Noto))
- Love, Chunibyo & Other Delusions (Tōka Takanashi (Eri Sendai)
- Neon Genesis Evangelion (Misato Katsuragi (Kotono Mitsuishi))
- X (Satsuki Yatōji (Hōko Kuwashima))

=== Live-action ===
- 7th Heaven (Sandy Jameson (Haylie Duff))
- Charmed (Billie Jenkins (Kaley Cuoco))
- Home Alone 3 (Molly Pruitt (Scarlett Johansson))
- Joan of Arcadia (Joan Girardi (Amber Tamblyn))
- Marie Antoinette (Marie-Louise, princesse de Lamballe (Mary Nighy))
- Material Girls (Ava Marchetta (Haylie Duff))
- New York Minute (Roxy Ryan (Mary-Kate Olsen))
- The O.C. (Lindsay Wheeler-Gardner (Shannon Lucio))
- The Quiet (Nina Deer (Elisha Cuthbert))
- Sin City (Becky (Alexis Bledel))
- Skipped Parts (Maurey Pierce (Mischa Barton))
