= Saalfeld-Rudolstadt – Saale-Holzland-Kreis – Saale-Orla-Kreis =

Federal electoral district of Germany

194 Saalfeld-Rudolstadt – Saale-Holzland-Kreis – Saale-Orla-Kreis
- Electoral district for the Bundestag
- Saalfeld-Rudolstadt – Saale-Holzland-Kreis – Saale-Orla-Kreis in 2025
- State: Thuringia
- Population: 266,500 (2019)
- Electorate: 219,437 (2021)
- Major settlements: Saalfeld; Rudolstadt; Pößneck
- Area: 2,975.3 km^{2}

Current electoral district
- Created: 2002
- Party: AfD
- Member: Michael Kaufmann
- Elected: 2021, 2025

Saalfeld-Rudolstadt – Saale-Holzland-Kreis – Saale-Orla-Kreis is an electoral constituency (German: Wahlkreis) represented in the Bundestag. It elects one member via first-past-the-post voting. Under the current constituency numbering system, it is designated as constituency 194. It is located in eastern Thuringia, comprising the districts of Saalfeld-Rudolstadt, Saale-Holzland-Kreis, and Saale-Orla-Kreis.

Saalfeld-Rudolstadt – Saale-Holzland-Kreis – Saale-Orla-Kreis was created for the 2002 federal election. Since 2021, it has been represented by Michael Kaufmann of Alternative for Germany (AfD).

== Geography ==
Saalfeld-Rudolstadt – Saale-Holzland-Kreis – Saale-Orla-Kreis is located in eastern Thuringia. As of the 2021 federal election, it comprises the districts of Saalfeld-Rudolstadt, Saale-Holzland-Kreis, and Saale-Orla-Kreis.

== History ==
Saalfeld-Rudolstadt – Saale-Holzland-Kreis – Saale-Orla-Kreis was created in 2002, then known as Sonneberg – Saalfeld-Rudolstadt – Saale-Orla-Kreis. It acquired its current name in the 2017 election. In the 2002 election, it was constituency 198 in the numbering system. In the 2005 election, it was number 197. In the 2009 and 2013 elections, it was number 196. In the 2017 and 2021 elections, it was number 195. From the 2025 election, it has been number 194.

Originally, the constituency comprised the districts of Sonneberg, Saalfeld-Rudolstadt, and Saale-Orla-Kreis. It acquired its current borders in the 2017 election.

Election	No.	Name	Borders
2002	198	Sonneberg – Saalfeld-Rudolstadt – Saale-Orla-Kreis	Sonneberg district; Saalfeld-Rudolstadt district; Saale-Orla-Kreis district
2005	197	Sonneberg – Saalfeld-Rudolstadt – Saale-Orla-Kreis	Sonneberg district; Saalfeld-Rudolstadt district; Saale-Orla-Kreis district
2009	196	Sonneberg – Saalfeld-Rudolstadt – Saale-Orla-Kreis	Sonneberg district; Saalfeld-Rudolstadt district; Saale-Orla-Kreis district
2013	196	Sonneberg – Saalfeld-Rudolstadt – Saale-Orla-Kreis	Sonneberg district; Saalfeld-Rudolstadt district; Saale-Orla-Kreis district
2017	195	Saalfeld-Rudolstadt – Saale-Holzland-Kreis – Saale-Orla-Kreis	Saalfeld-Rudolstadt district; Saale-Holzland-Kreis district; Saale-Orla-Kreis district
2021	195	Saalfeld-Rudolstadt – Saale-Holzland-Kreis – Saale-Orla-Kreis	Saalfeld-Rudolstadt district; Saale-Holzland-Kreis district; Saale-Orla-Kreis district
2025	194	Saalfeld-Rudolstadt – Saale-Holzland-Kreis – Saale-Orla-Kreis	Saalfeld-Rudolstadt district; Saale-Holzland-Kreis district; Saale-Orla-Kreis district

== Members ==
The constituency was first represented by Christine Lehder of the Social Democratic Party (SPD) from 2002 to 2005, followed by Gerhard Botz of the SPD from 2005 to 2009. Carola Stauche of the Christian Democratic Union (CDU) was representative from 2009 to 2017. Albert Weiler was elected in the 2017 election. The constituency was won by Michael Kaufmann of the Alternative for Germany (AfD) in 2021.

Election	Member	Party	%
2002	Christine Lehder	SPD	41.6
2005	Gerhard Botz	SPD	30.2
2009	Carola Stauche	CDU	31.9
2013	Carola Stauche	CDU	41.1
2017	Albert Weiler	CDU	30.9
2021	Michael Kaufmann	AfD	29.3
2025	Michael Kaufmann	AfD	44.5

== Election results ==
=== 2025 election ===
Federal election (2025): Saalfeld-Rudolstadt – Saale-Holzland-Kreis – Saale-Orla-Kreis
Notes:	Blue background denotes the winner of the electorate vote. Pink background denotes a candidate elected from their party list. Yellow background denotes an electorate win by a list member, or other incumbent. A ✓ or ✗ denotes status of any incumbent, win or lose respectively.						
Party	Candidate	Votes	%	±%	Party votes	%	±%
AfD	✓ Michael Kaufmann	76,207	44.5	▲15.2	73,580	42.9	▲14.7
CDU	Diana Herbstreuth	35,224	20.6	▼0.4	30,756	17.9	▲1.5
Left	Mandy Eißing	21,113	12.3	▲0.2	23,080	13.5	▲2.2
SPD	Bastian Dohna	14,260	8.3	▼10.4	12,905	7.5	▼13.7
BSW	Jörg Lohse	12,413	7.2	New	17,012	9.9	New
Greens	Astrid Matthey	4,340	2.5	▼1.3	5,055	2.9	▼1.5
FW	Franz Gobel	3,943	2.3	▼0.8	2,822	1.6	▼0.8
FDP	Manuel Matzner	3,834	2.2	▼5.3	4,811	2.8	▼6.6
Volt					773	0.5	▲0.2
BD					470	0.3	New
MLPD					176	0.1	▼0.1
Informal votes		1,267			1,161		
Total valid votes		171,334			171,440		
Turnout		172,601	81.6	▲5.7			
AfD hold	Majority	40,983	23.9	▲15.6			

=== 2021 election ===
Federal election (2021): Saalfeld-Rudolstadt – Saale-Holzland-Kreis – Saale-Orla-Kreis
Notes:	Blue background denotes the winner of the electorate vote. Pink background denotes a candidate elected from their party list. Yellow background denotes an electorate win by a list member, or other incumbent. A ✓ or ✗ denotes status of any incumbent, win or lose respectively.						
Party	Candidate	Votes	%	±%	Party votes	%	±%
AfD	Michael Kaufmann	48,177	29.3	▲2.8	46,381	28.2	▲2.4
CDU	✗ Albert Weiler	34,489	21.0	▼10.0	27,008	16.4	▼11.8
SPD	Cordelius Ilgmann	30,791	18.7	▲7.1	35,019	21.3	▲9.2
Left	Frank Tempel	19,968	12.1	▼5.0	18,489	11.2	▼5.3
FDP	Reginald Hanke	12,343	7.5	▲1.4	15,428	9.4	▲1.6
Greens	Susanne Martin	6,292	3.8	▲0.4	7,383	4.5	▲1.5
FW	Torsten Heilmann	5,143	3.1	▼0.3	4,079	2.5	▲0.5
PARTEI	Gerry Fiedler	3,526	2.1		2,283	1.4	▼0.1
dieBasis	Saskia Graupe	2,852	1.7		2,668	1.6	
Tierschutzpartei					2,510	1.5	
Pirates					645	0.4	0.0
NPD					547	0.3	▼0.9
Menschliche Welt					493	0.3	
Volt					388	0.2	
Team Todenhöfer					374	0.2	
MLPD	Janine Walter-Rupprecht	462	0.3		338	0.2	▲0.1
ÖDP	Michael Gehrmann-Gacasa	451	0.3		293	0.2	▼0.3
Humanists					152	0.1	
V-Partei3					145	0.1	▼0.2
Informal votes		2,037			1,908		
Total valid votes		164,494			164,623		
Turnout		166,531	75.9	▲0.8			
AfD gain from CDU	Majority	13,688	8.3				

=== 2017 election ===
Federal election (2017): Saalfeld-Rudolstadt – Saale-Holzland-Kreis – Saale-Orla-Kreis
Notes:	Blue background denotes the winner of the electorate vote. Pink background denotes a candidate elected from their party list. Yellow background denotes an electorate win by a list member, or other incumbent. A ✓ or ✗ denotes status of any incumbent, win or lose respectively.						
Party	Candidate	Votes	%	±%	Party votes	%	±%
CDU	Albert Weiler	52,311	30.9	▼10.3	47,769	28.1	▼10.1
AfD	Michael Kaufmann	44,894	26.5	▲24.7	43,740	25.8	▲18.6
Left	Ralf Kalich	28,926	17.1	▼8.4	28,088	16.5	▼7.8
SPD	Alexander Meinhardt-Heib	19,753	11.7	▼7.1	20,427	12.0	▼3.2
FDP	Reginald Hanke (Note: Hanke entered the Bundestag on the FDP list after the resignation of Thomas Kemmerich in November 2019.)	10,323	6.1	▲3.9	13,209	7.8	▲5.2
Greens	Stephanie Erben	5,726	3.4	▼0.5	5,124	3.0	▼1.0
FW	Jens Streubel	5,717	3.4	▲3.0	3,300	1.9	▲0.5
PARTEI					2,494	1.5	
NPD					2,083	1.2	▼2.4
Independent	Wilfried Meißner	923	0.5				
Independent	Günter Metzler	779	0.5				
Pirates					736	0.4	▼1.9
ÖDP					733	0.4	▼0.2
DM					729	0.4	
BGE					654	0.4	
V-Partei³					425	0.3	
MLPD					240	0.1	0.0
Informal votes		2,527			2,128		
Total valid votes		169,352			169,751		
Turnout		171,879	75.0	▲5.9			
CDU hold	Majority	7,417	4.4	▼10.3			

=== 2013 election ===
Federal election (2013): Sonneberg – Saalfeld-Rudolstadt – Saale-Orla-Kreis
Notes:	Blue background denotes the winner of the electorate vote. Pink background denotes a candidate elected from their party list. Yellow background denotes an electorate win by a list member, or other incumbent. A ✓ or ✗ denotes status of any incumbent, win or lose respectively.						
Party	Candidate	Votes	%	±%	Party votes	%	±%
CDU	✓ Carola Stauche	59,153	41.1	▲9.3	54,859	37.9	▲7.5
Left	Knut Korschewsky	37,908	26.4	▼4.9	35,819	24.8	▼6.1
SPD	Christoph Majewski	28,521	19.8	▲0.9	23,002	15.9	▼1.1
AfD					9,807	6.8	
NPD	Uwe Bäz-Dölle	7,440	5.2	▲0.7	5,292	3.7	▼0.4
Greens	Stephanie Erben	5,674	3.9	▲0.1	5,442	3.8	▼0.8
FDP	Alf-Heinz Borchardt	3,279	2.3	▼6.3	3,552	2.5	▼7.3
Pirates					3,231	2.2	0.0
FW					2,065	1.4	
Independent	Meißner	1,053	0.7				
ÖDP					895	0.6	▲0.2
MLPD		835	0.6	▲0.2	349	0.2	0.0
REP					343	0.2	▼0.2
Informal votes		3,177			2,384		
Total valid votes		143,863			144,656		
Turnout		147,040	67.3	▲2.9			
CDU hold	Majority	21,245	14.7	▲14.0			

=== 2009 election ===
Federal election (2009): Sonneberg – Saalfeld-Rudolstadt – Saale-Orla-Kreis
Notes:	Blue background denotes the winner of the electorate vote. Pink background denotes a candidate elected from their party list. Yellow background denotes an electorate win by a list member, or other incumbent. A ✓ or ✗ denotes status of any incumbent, win or lose respectively.						
Party	Candidate	Votes	%	±%	Party votes	%	±%
CDU	Carola Stauche	46,726	31.9	▲5.5	44,770	30.4	▲5.5
Left	Norbert Schneider	45,820	31.2	▲5.3	45,439	30.9	▲3.1
SPD	Anette Feike	27,824	19.0	▼11.2	25,004	17.0	▼12.4
FDP	Volker Weber	12,534	8.5	▲3.6	14,342	9.8	▲2.3
NPD	Patrick Trautsch	6,574	4.5	▼0.3	5,978	4.1	▼0.5
Greens	Filip Heinlein	5,684	3.9	▲1.2	6,654	4.5	▲0.9
Pirates					3,340	2.3	
Independent	Arthur Wolfram Krauß	934	0.6				
REP					615	0.4	▼0.3
ÖDP					557	0.4	
MLPD	Andreas Eifler	582	0.4	▼0.1	395	0.3	▼0.3
Informal votes		2,261			1,845		
Total valid votes		146,678			147,094		
Turnout		148,939	64.4	▼11.1			
CDU gain from SPD	Majority	906	0.7				

=== 2005 election ===
Federal election (2005):Sonneberg – Saalfeld-Rudolstadt – Saale-Orla-Kreis
Notes:	Blue background denotes the winner of the electorate vote. Pink background denotes a candidate elected from their party list. Yellow background denotes an electorate win by a list member, or other incumbent. A ✓ or ✗ denotes status of any incumbent, win or lose respectively.						
Party	Candidate	Votes	%	±%	Party votes	%	±%
SPD	Gerhard Botz	53,561	30.2	▼11.4	52,230	29.4	▼10.7
CDU	Falk Eichhorn	46,818	26.4	▼4.8	44,322	24.9	▼4.8
Left	Roland Hahnemann	46,099	26.0	▲7.5	49,406	27.8	▲10.1
FDP	Volker Weber	8,850	5.0	▼0.7	13,278	7.5	▲2.0
NPD	Uwe Bäz-Dölle	8,520	4.8		8,164	4.6	▲3.3
Greens	Ulrike Lieberknecht	4,687	2.6	▲0.4	6,501	3.7	▲0.4
Independent	Hartmut Stein	4,685	2.6				
Independent	Andreas Scheffczyk	3,446	1.9				
GRAUEN					1,616	0.9	▲0.6
REP					1,254	0.7	▼0.3
MLPD	Andreas Eifler	806	0.5		1,089	0.6	
Informal votes		3,614			3,226		
Total valid votes		177,472			177,860		
Turnout		181,086	75.5	▲0.8			
SPD hold	Majority	6,743	3.8				
