= Danielly Kaufmann =

Luxembourg and Brazilian visual artist

- Born: 6 January 1984

Danielly Kaufmann, formerly credited as Danielly O. M. M., is a Luxembourg-Brazilian visual artist and filmmaker.

She co-directed, alongside Gregorio Gananian, the film Inaudito, a biography of Lanny Gordin.

Participated as an actress and in the art direction department in the film Alegria é a Prova dos Nove, by Helena Ignez.

Kaufmann carried out the filming and pre-production coordination of a documentary for Sensibilité Politique Piraten, her last project as a filmmaker. The documentary was not released.

== Filmography ==
=== Cinema ===
Ano	Filme	Role				
Ano	Filme	Director	Art director	Actress	Movie producer	Notes
2009	Fala Boca! Saudades do Triunfo	Yes	Yes		Yes	
2011	Vias Veias	Yes	Yes		Yes	Co-directed by Gregorio Gananian.
2017	Inaudito	Yes	Yes		Yes	Co-directed by Gregorio Gananian.
2018	Tea for Two		Yes			Short film.
2023	A alegria é a prova dos nove		Yes	Yes		
2023	Aquele que viu o abismo			Yes		
