= Elliot Koffman =

American computer scientist and educationist

Elliot Bruce Koffman
- Born: May 7, 1942 (age 83); Boston, Massachusetts
- Occupation: Computer scientist
- Known for: Educational development and textbooks

Elliot Bruce Koffman (born 7 May 1942) is a noted computer scientist and educationist. He is the author of numerous widely used introductory textbooks for more than 10 different programming languages, including Ada, BASIC, C, C++, FORTRAN, Java, Modula-2, and Pascal. Since 1974, he has been a professor of computer and information sciences at Temple University, Philadelphia, Pennsylvania.

== Education and career ==
Koffman attended the Massachusetts Institute of Technology, where he earned his Bachelor of Engineering and Master of Engineering degrees in 1964. He received his PhD in 1967 at Case Institute of Technology with a dissertation on learning games through pattern recognition.

That same year, Koffman began work at the National Security Agency in Fort Meade, Maryland as an electrical engineer. He was promoted to captain of the U.S. Army and assigned to the Defense Intelligence Agency in Washington, D.C. from 1967 to 1969.

Koffman also began his teaching career in 1967, serving as a professorial lecturer at George Washington University, Washington, D.C. (1967–1969); an Assistant Professor (1969–1972) and Associate Professor (1972–1974) in the Department of Electrical Engineering and Computer Science at the University of Connecticut; and an Associate Professor (1974–1978) and Full Professor (1978–present) in the Department of Computer and Information Sciences at Temple University.

Koffman's early research was in artificial intelligence and intelligent tutoring systems. In 1974 he began writing and co-authoring textbooks for introductory programming courses for computer science majors (CS1) in programming languages such as Ada, BASIC, C, C++, Fortran, Java, Modula-2, and Pascal. He also wrote textbooks for the first data structures course (CS2) in C++, Java, and Pascal.

In 2009 he was awarded the SIGCSE Outstanding Contribution Award "for an extraordinary record of teaching, curriculum development, publishing papers as well as numerous textbooks, and for helping to shape Computer Science education".

== Other activities ==
Koffman chaired the Association for Computing Machinery (ACM) task force to revise CS1 and CS2 courses from 1983 to 1985. He was also chairman of the ACM Special Interest Group in Computer Science Education (SIGCSE) from 1987 to 1991.

== Family ==
Koffman married Caryn Jackson in 1963. She is a photographer whose work has won awards and has been featured in a local gallery. They have three children, Richard, Deborah and Robin. They live in Elkins Park, Pennsylvania.

== Bibliography ==
- Learning Through Pattern Recognition Applied to a Class of Games. Defense Technical Information Center. 1967.
- Problem solving and structured programming in BASIC. Addison-Wesley. 1979. ISBN 0-201-03888-9. "Elliot koffman textbooks." (with Frank L. Friedman)
- Pascal: A problem solving approach. Addison-Wesley. 1982. ISBN 0-201-10341-9. "Elliot koffman textbooks."
- Problem solving and structured programming in WATFIV. Addison-Wesley. 1982. ISBN 0-201-10482-2. (with Frank L. Friedman)
- Problem solving in structured BASIC-PLUS and VAX-11 BASIC. Addison-Wesley. 1984. ISBN 0-201-10344-3. "Elliot koffman textbooks." (with Frank L. Friedman)
- Problem solving and structured programming in Pascal. Addison-Wesley. 1985. ISBN 0-201-11736-3. "Elliot koffman textbooks."
- Problem solving and structured programming in Modula-2. Addison-Wesley. 1988. ISBN 0-201-07828-7. "Elliot koffman textbooks."
- Problem solving and structured programming in FORTRAN (5th ed.). Addison-Wesley. 1993. ISBN 0-201-55875-0. (with Frank L. Friedman)
- Fortran with engineering applications. Addison-Wesley. 1993. ISBN 0-201-54274-9. "fortran with engineering applications."
- Software design and data structures in Turbo Pascal. Addison-Wesley. 1994. ISBN 0-201-15624-5. (with Bruce R. Maxim)
- Pascal (5th ed.). Addison-Wesley. 1995. ISBN 0-201-52674-3.
- Turing: Problem solving and program design. Addison-Wesley. 1995. ISBN 0-201-42640-4. (with Richard C. Holt and Chrysanne DiMarco)
- Fortran (5th ed.). Addison-Wesley. 1997. ISBN 0-201-59062-X. (with Frank L. Friedman)
- Turbo Pascal – Web Update (5th ed.). Addison-Wesley. 1998. ISBN 0-201-35086-6.
- "Ada: Problem Solving and Program Design." Feldman, Michael B. & Koffman, Elliot B., ISBN 0-201-52279-9. Addison-Wesley Publishing Company; 1992 & 1993. 795 pages.
- Ada 95: Problem solving and program design (3rd ed.). Addison-Wesley. 1999. ISBN 0-201-36123-X. (with Michael B. Feldman)
- Problem Solving, Abstraction, & Design Using C++: The Visual C++ Manual. Addison-Wesley. 2001. ISBN 0-201-75066-X. (with Frank L. Friedman)
- Problem solving with Java (2nd ed.). Addison-Wesley. 2002. ISBN 0-201-72214-3. "Elliot koffman." (with Ursula Wolz)
- C program design for engineers (2nd ed.). Addison-Wesley Longman. 2001. ISBN 0-201-70871-X. (with Jeri R. Hanly)
- Objects, abstraction, data structures and design using Java. John Wiley & Sons. 2004. ISBN 0-471-46756-1. (with Paul A. T. Wolfgang)
- Problem solving and program design in C (5th ed.). Pearson Addison-Wesley. 2007. ISBN 978-0-321-40991-1. (with Jeri R. Hanly)
- Problem Solving, Abstraction, and Design Using C++ (6th ed.). Pearson Education. 2010. ISBN 978-0-13-706781-7. (with Frank L. Friedman)
- Data Structures: Abstraction and Design Using Java (2nd ed.). Wiley. 2010. ISBN 978-0-470-12870-1. (with Paul A. T. Wolfgang)
