= Karl Kaufmann (painter) =

Austrian painter (1843–1905)

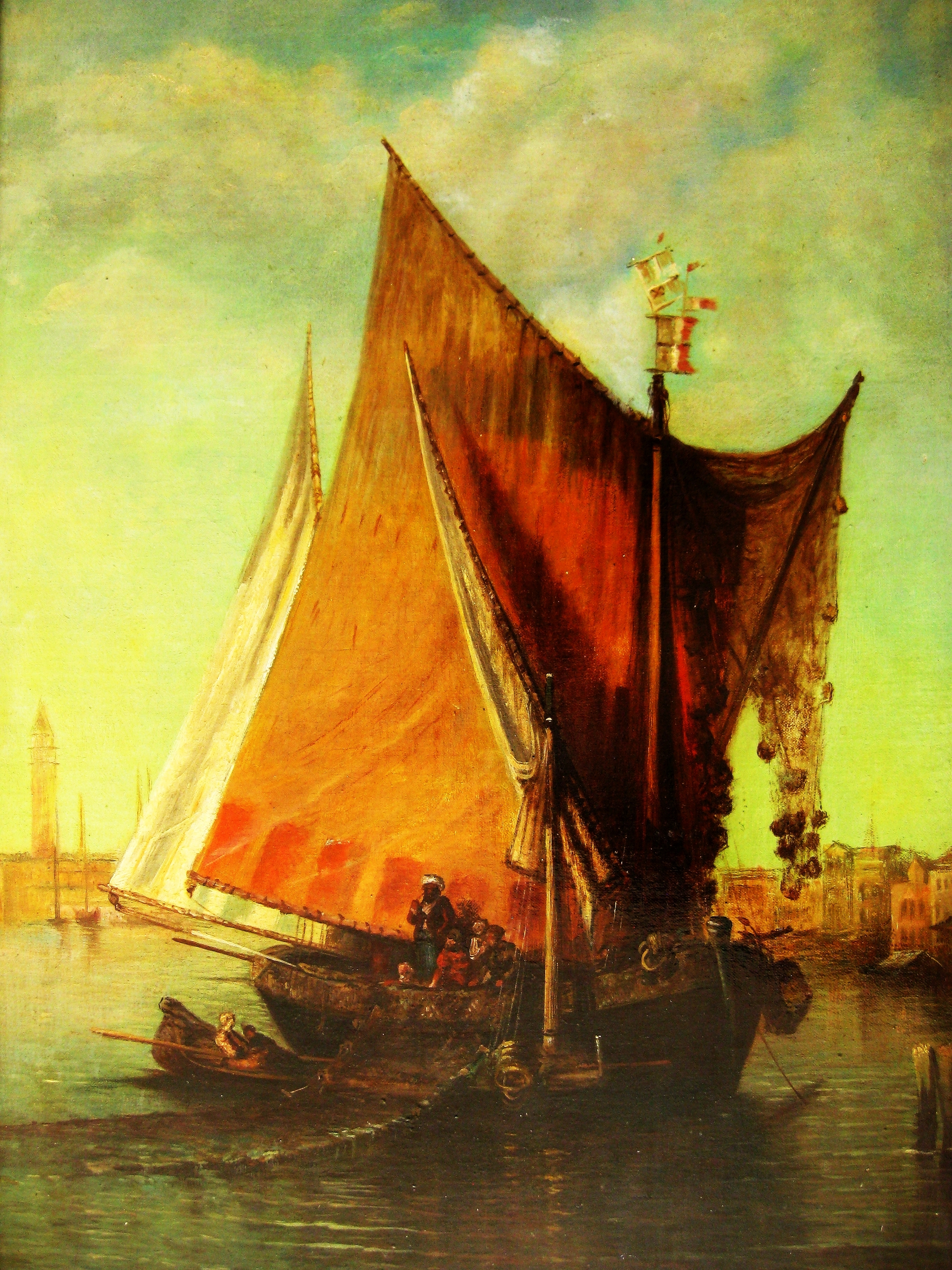
Fishermen in the Venetian Lagoon, 1884

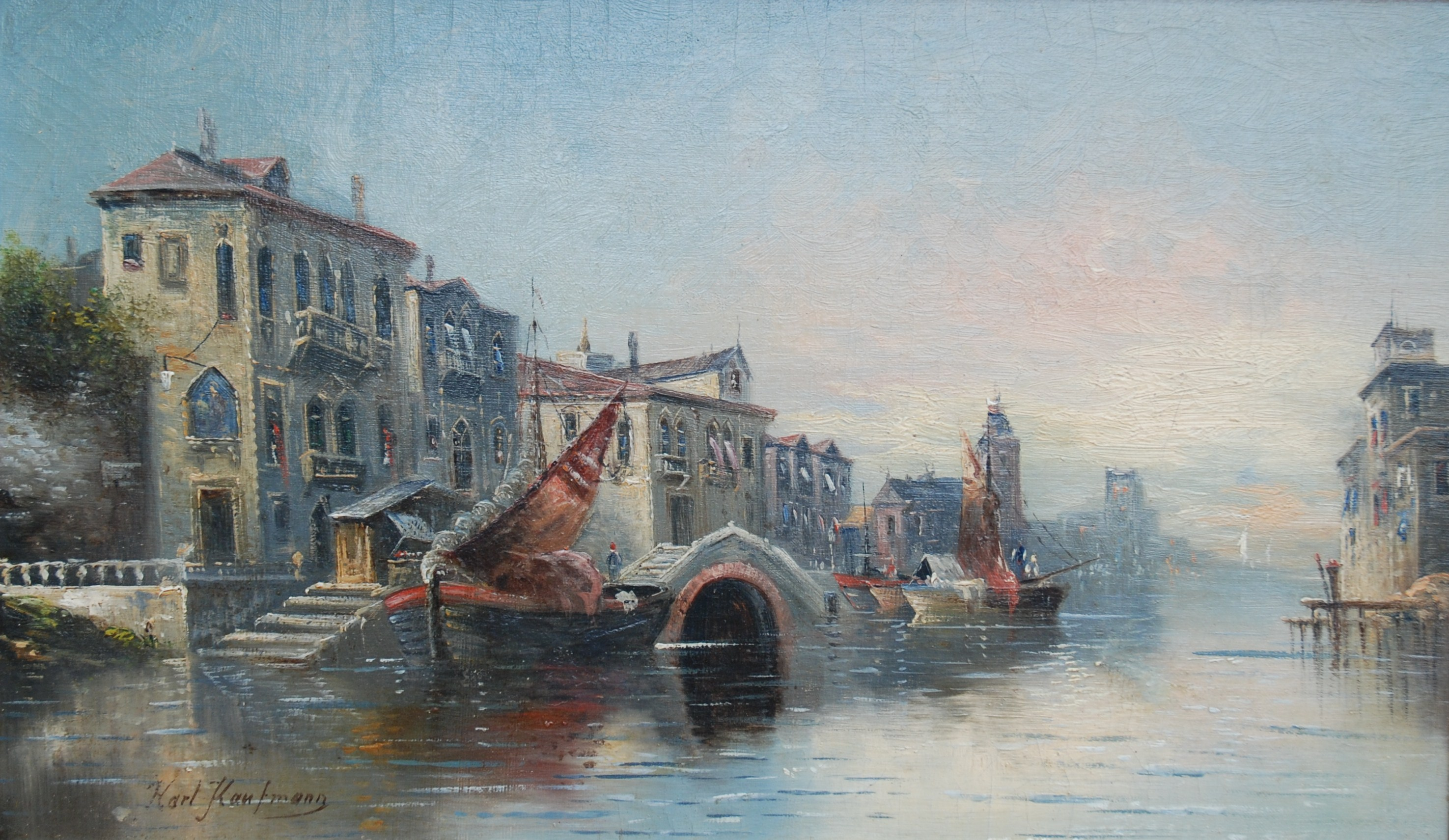
Venice – Canal Grande, c. 1890

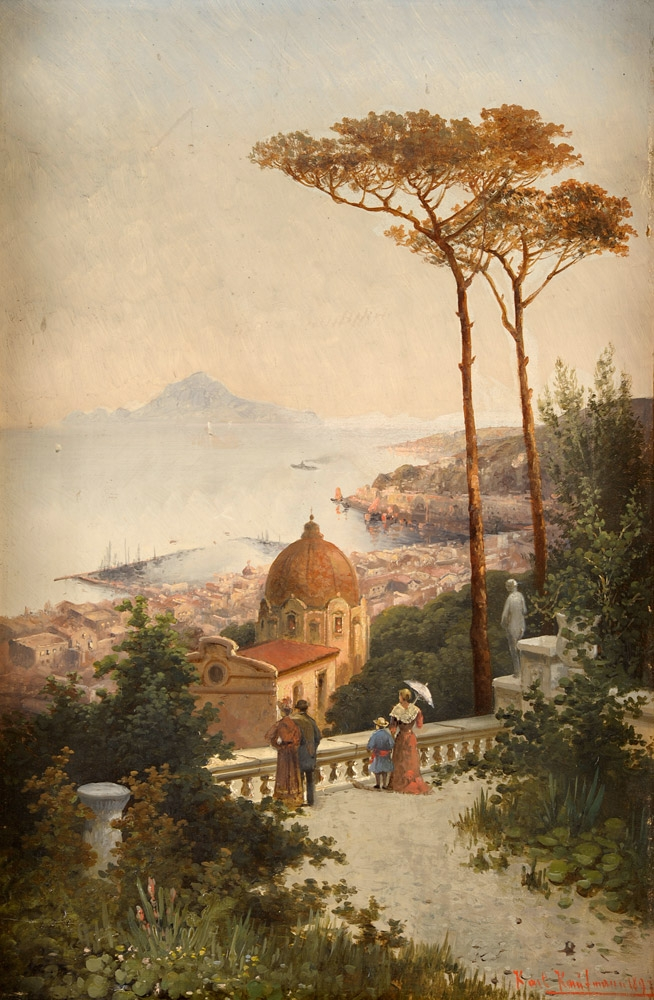
View on Capri, c. 1901

Karl Kaufmann (1843 – 27 April 1905) was an Austrian landscape and architectural painter.

== Life ==
Karl Kaufmann was born in 1843 in Neplachowitz, Austrian Silesia (now Neplachovice, Czech Republic). He was a student at the Vienna Academy. His studies in the European North (Norway), to Holland, Germany (Franconia, Danzig, Königsberg) and often to Italy (Naples, Rome, Venice) gave him the motives for his numerous landscapes, including a remarkable number of views of Venice.

From 1900, Kaufmann constantly lived in Vienna. He died on 27 April 1905 in Vienna.

== Work ==
He often signed his works using pseudonyms. Among various other names, Byon, H. Carnier, W. Carnier, C. Carlo, F. Gilbert, O. Halm, C.Charpentier, J. Holmstedt, Charles Marchand, R. Merkner, B. Lambert, E. Leutner, M. Heger, Hobart, L. van Howe / van Hove, R. Jäger, Laarsen, Lundberg, F. Marchant, J. Marchant, C. Poul, F. Rodek, J. Rollin, Taupiac, L. Voigt or R. Benda, have often been used.

Today the majority of Karl Kaufmann's paintings are privately owned. Some of his paintings have been sold in art auctions for considerable prices (32,450 GBP).
