= Klaus Kaufmann =

Austrian pianist and teacher (born 1948)

Klaus Kaufmann (born 1948 in Rosenheim) is an Austrian pianist and teacher who founded the Austrian-Chinese-Music-University, a project in which allows him to teach Chinese students from his home in Salzburg, with the aid of modern technology and airplane trips back and forth yearly.

Kaufmann has performed in various Asian countries, including China and Japan. Aside from teaching, he has been seen in numerous broadcasts and CD recordings. He mainly records for Koch-International.

Since 2000, Kaufmann is titled the Professor of Piano at the Mozarteum University for Music and the Performing Arts of Salzburg. There, in 2008, he became the head of the keyboard instruments department.
