= Joan Kaufman (psychologist) =

American child psychologist

- Born: Joan Robin Kaufman
- Education: Tufts University; Yale University
- Scientific career
- Fields: Child abuse and neglect
- Workplaces: Yale School of Medicine; Johns Hopkins School of Medicine; Kennedy Krieger Institute
- Thesis: Depressive disorders in maltreated children (1990)
- Doctoral advisor: Albert J. Solnit

Joan Robin Kaufman is an American child psychologist who researches child abuse and neglect. She is a professor of psychiatry and behavioral sciences at the Johns Hopkins School of Medicine. She is the director of research at the center for child and family traumatic stress at the Kennedy Krieger Institute. Kaufman worked at the Yale School of Medicine from 1998 to 2015.

== Life ==
Kaufman completed a B.A. from Tufts University in 1981. She earned a Ph.D. at Yale University in 1990. Her dissertation was titled, Depressive disorders in maltreated children. Albert J. Solnit was her doctoral advisor. Kaufman worked at the Yale School of Medicine in the department of psychiatry from 1998 to 2015.

In 2015, she joined the Johns Hopkins School of Medicine as a professor of psychiatry and behavioral sciences. She is director of research at the center for child and family traumatic stress at Kennedy Krieger Institute. She researches different areas of child abuse and neglect including its neurobiology and social policies.

== Selected works ==
- Kaufman, Joan (2016). Broken Three Times: A Story of Child Abuse in America. Oxford University Press. ISBN 978-0-19-939915-4.
