= Feroze =

Firouz, Firuz, Pirooz, Firoz, Pirouz, Feroz, Feroze, Phiroz, or Phiroze is a masculine given name and surname of Persian origin. It is ultimately derived from Middle Persian Pērōz (Inscriptional Pahlavi: 𐭯𐭩𐭫𐭥𐭰, Book Pahlavi:), meaning "victorious, triumphant or prosperous", mentioned as Perozes (Περόζης) in Latin and Ancient Greek sources. Notable people with the name include:

== Given name ==
=== Feroz ===
- Feroz Abbasi (born 1979), British Guantanamo detainee
- Feroz Ahmad (1938–2025), Turkish-American academic, historian, and political scientist
- Feroz Baharudin (born 2000), Malaysian footballer
- Feroz Gul (1943–1996), Pakistani musician and composer
- Feroz Khan (actor) (1935–2009), Indian actor, film editor, producer, and director
- Feroz Khan (police officer) (born 1970), South African police officer
- Feroz Abbas Khan (born 1959), Indian theatre and film director, playwright, and screenwriter
- Feroz Ahmed Khan, Indian politician
- Feroz Nizami (1910–1975), Pakistani film score composer, music director, and classical singer
- Feroz Rather, Indian-American novelist and academic
- Feroz Ahammed Shapon (born 1961), Bangladeshi politician
- Feroz Sherif (born 1971), Indian football coach and player

=== Feroze ===
- Feroze Butt (1942–2014), Pakistani cricket umpire
- Feroze Gandhi (1912–1960), Indian activist, politician, and journalist
- Feroze Ghayas (born 1973), Indian cricketer
- Feroze Gujral (born 1965), Indian philanthropist, businesswoman, columnist, media personality, and model
- Feroze Jamal Shah Kakakhel, Pakistani politician
- Feroze Khan (born 1990), Pakistani actor
- Feroze Khan (field hockey) (1904–2005), Indian field hockey player
- Feroze Khushi (born 1999), English cricketer
- Feroze Mithiborwala, Indian political activist, columnist, and commentator
- Feroze V Rasheed (born 1969), Indian cricketer

=== Firouz ===
- Firouz, Armenian Seljuk Turkish official
- Firouz Abdolmohammadian (born 1942), Iranian water polo player
- Firouz Alizadeh (1946–2005), Greco-Roman wrestler
- Firouz Bagherzadeh (1930–2021), Iranian archaeologist and art scholar
- Firouz Gahvari, American economist
- Firouz Karimi (born 1958), Iranian football coach and player
- Firouz Naderi (1946–2023), Iranian-American scientist
- Firouz Nosrat-ed-Dowleh III (1889–1937), Iranian politician
- Firouz Partovi (born 1936), Iranian-American physicist and university professor
- Firouz Pojhan (1926–1996), Iranian weightlifter

=== Firoz ===
- Firoz Ahmed (born 1975), Bangladeshi researcher, writer, and editor
- Firoz Cachalia (born 1958), South African lawyer and politician
- Firoz Chuttipara (born 1984), Indian YouTuber
- Firoz Dastur (1919–2008), Indian actor and singer
- Firoz Ghanty (1952–2019), Mauritian painter, poet, and activist
- Firoz Irani (born 1945), Indian actor, producer, director, and writer
- Firoz Kassam (born 1955), British businessman
- Firoz Khan (born 1962), Indian actor
- Firoz Mahmud (born 1974), Bangladeshi visual artist
- Firoz Merchant (born 1958), Indian businessman and philanthropist
- Firoz Khan Noon (1893–1970), Pakistani politician
- Firoz Shah (1914–2007), Pakistani Navy officer

=== Firoze ===
- Firoze Manji (born 1950), Kenyan activist

=== Firuz ===
- Firuz Aituganov (born 1990), Tajik-Russian serial killer and rapist
- Firuz Bey, Ottoman military officer and politician
- Firuz Bobiev (born 1992), Tajikistani footballer
- Firuz Husayn (died 703), Iranian aristocrat
- Firuz Kanatlı (1932–2017), Turkish businessman
- Firuz Kazemzadeh (1924–2017), Russian-American historian and academic
- Firuz Mirza (1817–1886), Qajar prince, military commander, and administrator
- Firuz Mustafa (born 1952), Azerbaijani writer, playwright, and philosopher
- Firuz Mustafayev (1933–2018), Azerbajaini politician
- Firuza Sharipova (born 1994), Kazakh boxer
- Firuz Shah Suri (1542–1554), Sultan of Hindustan
- Firuz Shah Tughlaq (1309–1388), Sultan of Delhi
- Firuza Velikhanli (born 1970), Azerbaijani chess player
- Firuz-Shah Zarrin-Kolah, Kurdish dignitary

=== Peroz ===
- Peroz (Kidarite), Kidarite ruler of Gandhara
- Peroz (Mihranid) (died 361), vice-king of Gogarene and Gardman
- Peroz of Meshan, Sasanian prince
- Peroz I (died 484), Sassanian king
- Peroz II (died 630), Sassanian king
- Peroz I Kushanshah (died 275), Kushanshah of the Kushano-Sasanian Kingdom
- Peroz II Kushanshah (died 330), Kushanshah of the Kushano-Sasanian Kingdom
- Peroz III (636–678), Sassanian king

=== Peruz ===
- Peruz (1866–1920), Ottoman kanto singer and songwriter

=== Phiroz ===
- Phiroz Mehta (1902–1994), Indian writer, lecturer, and pianist

=== Phiroze ===
- Phiroze Jamshedji Jeejeebhoy (1915–1980), Indian businessman
- Phiroze Palia (1910–1981), Indian cricketer
- Phiroze Sethna (1866–1938), Indian businessman and politician

=== Pirooz ===
- Pirooz Kalayeh, Iranian-American film director, screenwriter, and writer

=== Pirouz ===
- Pirouz Adamiat (born 1949), Iranian fencer
- Pirouz Davani (1961–1998), Iranian activist
- Pirouz Ghorbani (born 1979), Iranian football coach and player
- Pirouz Hanachi (born 1964), Iranian architect and politician
- Pirouz Joghtapour (born 1958), Iranian footballer
- Pirouz Mojtahedzadeh (1946–2026), Iranian political scientist and historian
- Pirouz Nemati (born 1987), Iranian-Canadian actor and screenwriter
- Pirouz Pirouz, Iranian-American materials scientist

=== Piruz ===
- Piruz Dilanchi (born 1965), Iranian-Azerbaijani separatist leader and poet
- Piruz Khosrow (died 642), Persian aristocrat and general

== Surname ==
=== Feroz ===
- Jam Feroz II (died 1535), ruler of the Samma dynasty

=== Firuz ===
- Ruknuddin Firuz (1211–1236), Sultan of Delhi

== Other ==
- Pirouz (cheetah), a male Asiatic cheetah

== See also ==
- Piruz, Iran, a village in Hamadan
