= Parvīz =

Parviz
- Pronunciation: Persian: [pʰæɹ.ˈviːz]
- Gender: Male

Origin
- Origin: Persian
- Meaning: "fortunate", "victorious"
- Region of origin: Persia

Parvēz, Pērvaz, Parviz or Parvīs (Persian: پرویز, پرویز in Nastaliq, meaning "fortunate, victorious"; Middle Persian: plwyc Parvēz, also ʾplwyc Abarvēz/Aparvēz), is a Persian male given name, mostly popular in Iran, Central Asia, South Asia and among Azeris. It is also a very common surname. Parvēz, Parvez, Parvīz, Parwez, Parwiz, Pervaiz, Pervaz, Pervez, Perviz, Parvase, or Purvez are usually the same name but with different spellings. Furthermore, pronunciation between these different spellings are generally extremely similar or identical. All of these are ultimately derived from the Middle Persian name Feroz, of which there are many variations, such as Piruz, Phiroze, Feroze, etc. Notable people with the name include:

== Given name ==
=== Parvej ===
- Parvej Khan (born 2004), Indian track athlete
- Parvej Musaraf (born 2003), Indian-Bengali cricketer
- Haji Parvej Ahmad (born 1963), Indian politician

=== Parvez ===
- Parvez Ahmad (born 1964), Indian politician
- Parvez Ahmed (born 1996), Indian-Bengali cricketer
- Parvez Ali, Indian politician
- Parvez Amin (born 2000), Afghan cricketer
- Parvez Aziz (born 1987), Indian-Bengali cricketer
- Parvez Butt (1942–2026), Pakistani nuclear engineer
- Parvez Dewan, Indian administrator, author, and librettist
- Parvez Diniar (born 1954), Indian basketballer
- Parvez Elahi (born 1945), Pakistani politician
- Parvez Hossain Emon (born 2002), Bangladeshi cricketer
- Parvez Haleem, Indian politician
- Parvez Haris (born 1964), Bangladeshi scientist
- Parvez Hashmi (born 1954), Indian politician
- Parvez Imroz, Indian human rights lawyer and a civil rights activist
- Parvez Rahman Jibon (born 2006), Bangladeshi cricketer
- Parvez Malik (1937–2008), Pakistani film director
- Parvez Mehdi (1947–2005), Pakistani ghazal singer
- Parvez Mir (born 1953), Pakistani TV anchor and cricketer
- Parvez Qadir, British actor
- Parvez Rasool (born 1989), Indian cricketer
- Parvez Rob (1962/63–2019), Bangladeshi composer and music director
- Parvez Sharma (born 1973), Indian film director
- Parvez Sultan (born 2003), Indian-Bengali cricketer

=== Parvis ===
- Parvis Emad (1935–2023), Iranian-American philosopher

=== Parviz ===
- Parviz Abdullayev (born 1986), Azerbaijani kickboxer
- Parviz Abnar (born 1958), Iranian sound recordist
- Parviz Aboutaleb (1942–2020), Iranian football player and manager
- Parviz Afshari (born 1955), Iranian diplomat
- Parviz Ansari (1954–2025), Iranian-American physicist and academic administrator
- Parviz Azadov (born 2000), Azerbaijani footballer
- Parviz Badpa (born 1954), Iranian boxer
- Parviz Baghirov (born 1994), Azerbaijani boxer
- Parviz Bahmani (born 1956), Iranian boxer
- Parviz Bahram (1933–2019), Iranian voice and theater actor
- Parviz Barati (born 1977), Iranian author
- Parviz Boroumand (born 1974), Iranian footballer
- Parviz Davoodi (1952–2024), Iranian politician
- Parviz Dehdari (1935–1992), Iranian footballer
- Parviz Fannizadeh (1938–1980), Iranian actor
- Parviz Farrokhi (born 1968), Iranian volleyball player
- Parviz Fattah (born 1961), Iranian politician
- Parviz Ghelichkhani (1945–2026), Iranian-French footballer
- Parviz Hadi (born 1987), Iranian wrestler
- Parviz Jalayer (1939–2019), Iranian weightlifter
- Parviz Kambin (1931–2020), American-Iranian medical doctor and surgeon
- Parviz Karami (born 1964), Iranian journalist and social scientist
- Parviz Karimi (born 1986), Iranian footballer
- Parviz Kazemi (born 1958), Iranian politician
- Parviz Kimiavi (born 1938), Iranian director and screenwriter
- Parviz Koozehkanani (1929–2025), Iranian footballer
- Parviz Mahmoud (1910–1996), Iranian composer and conductor
- Parviz Mansouri (1925–2011), Iranian musician
- Parviz Jabehdar Maralani (born 1941), Iranian electrical engineering
- Parviz Mazloumi (born 1954), Iranian footballer and manager
- Parviz Meshkatian (1955–2009), Iranian musician
- Parviz Mirza (1589–1626), Mughal noble
- Parviz Mirza (Qajar prince) (1823/24–1888), Qajar prince
- Parviz Moin (born 1952), Iranian physicist
- Parviz Nasibov (born 1998), Azerbaijani-born Ukrainian Greco-Roman wrestler
- Parviz Natel-Khanlari (1914–1990), Iranian literary scholar, linguist, author, researcher, politician, and professor
- Parviz Nikkhah (1939–1979), Iranian opposition figure
- Parviz Nouri (1938–2026), Iranian movie critic, screenwriter, and director
- Pierre Omidyar (born Parviz Omidyar) (born 1967), French-born Iranian-American entrepreneur
- Parviz Parastui (born 1955), Iranian actor
- Parviz Piran, Iranian sociologist
- Parviz Poorhosseini (1941–2020), Iranian film, theater, and television actor
- Parviz C. Radji (1936–2014), Iranian diplomat
- Parviz Rustambeyov (1922–1949), Azerbaijani saxophonist and jazz musician
- Parviz Sabeti (born 1936), Iranian lawyer
- Parviz Samedov (1970–1992), Azerbaijani war hero
- Parviz Sayyad (born 1939), Iranian actor
- Parviz Shahbazi (born 1962), Iranian filmmaker
- Parviz Shahbazov (born 1969), Azerbaijani politician
- Parviz Shapour (1924–1999), Iranian artist and man of letters
- Parviz Sobirov (born 1980), Tajik judoka
- Parviz Sorouri (born 1960), Iranian politician
- Parviz Tanavoli (born 1937), Iranian contemporary artist and sculptor
- Parviz Varjavand (1934–2007), Iranian archaeologist, researcher, university professor, and politician
- Parviz Yahaghi (1935–2007), Iranian composer and violinist
- Parviz Zafari, Iranian politician
- Parviz Zeidvand (born 1980), Iranian Greco-Roman wrestler

=== Pervez ===
- Pervez Amini Afshar (1921–1979), Iranian military officer
- Pervez Aziz (born 1975), Pakistani cricketer
- Pervez Bilgrami (born 1962), Pakistani writer
- Pervez Hoodbhoy (born 1950), Pakistani professor of nuclear physics
- Pervez Iqbal (1975–2002), Pakistani cricketer
- Pervez Kalim (born 1949), Pakistani film screenwriter and a director
- Pervez Khattak (born 1950), Pakistani politician
- Pervez Mir (born 1953), Pakistani TV anchorperson
- Pervez Musharraf (1943–2023), Pakistani politician
- Pervez Sajjad (born 1942), Pakistani cricketer
- Pervez Ali Shah (died 2021), Pakistani politician

== Surname ==
- Ahmed Pervez (1926–1979), Pakistani modernist painter
- Ansar Pervaiz, Pakistani nuclear scientist
- Anwar Pervez (born 1935), British businessman
- Aqsa Parvez (1991–2007), Pakistani-Canadian honor killing victim
- Arshad Pervez (1953–2024), Pakistani cricketer
- Fariha Pervez (born 1974), Pakistani musician
- Ghulam Ahmed Pervez (1903–1985), Pakistani Islamic scholar
- Imran Parvez (born 1977), Bangladeshi cricketer
- Masud Parvez (born 1947), Bangladeshi film actor, director and producer
- Murad Parvez (born 1972), Bangladeshi film and television director
- Saleem Pervez (1947–2013), Pakistani cricketer
- Tariq Pervez (born 1948), Pakistani policeman
- Yunus Parvez (1931–2007), Bollywood character actor
- Zeeshan Parwez, Pakistani musician
