= Feroz (disambiguation) =

Feroz (Persian, 'victorious') is a name.

Feroz or Firuz may also refer to:

== Arts and entertainment ==
- Feroz (film), a 1984 Spanish film
- Feroz (TV series), a 2010 Chilean telenovela

== Places ==
- Firuz District, Iran
- Firuz, Kerman, Iran
- Piruz, Iran, a village in Hamadan

== See also ==
- Firoza (disambiguation)
- Parviz, a related name
- Phiroze, a related name
- Feroze, a related name
- Piruzeh, Iran
