= Feroz =

Feroz or variants such as Firuz, Firuze, Peroz or Piruz (Persian, 'victorious') is a name.

== Historical people ==
- Peroz I (died 484), Sasanian emperor
- Peroz II, Sasanian emperor
- Fayruz al-Daylami, one of the companions of the Prophet
- Piruz Khosrow (died 642), Persian aristocrat who murdered Boran, the Sasanian empress
- Abu Lu'lu'a (died 644), also known as Peroz Nahavandi, a Persian slave who killed the second caliph, Umar
- Peroz III (636-679), son of Yazdegerd III, the last Sasanian emperor, who traveled to Tang China and became a general and governor
- Firouz, a wealthy Armenian Christian convert to Islam who held a high post in the Seljuk government
- Ruknuddin Firuz (1211-1236), ruled the Delhi Sultanate for a short time
- Jalal-ud-Din Khalji (1220-1296), known as Firuz al-Din Khalji (r. 1290–1296), the first Indian ruler of the Delhi Sultanate and the founder of the Khalji dynasty
- Firuz-Shah Zarrin-Kolah, 13th-century Safavid dignitary of Kurdish origin
- Shamsuddin Firuz Shah (died 1322), independent ruler of the Lakhnauti Kingdom
- Taj ud-Din Firuz Shah (died 1422), sultan of the Bahmani Sultanate in India
- Firuz Shah Tughlaq (1309-1388), Muslim ruler of the Tughlaq dynasty in India
- Firuz Shah Suri (1542-1554), 3rd ruler of the Sur Empire in India
- Alauddin Firuz Shah I, ruled the Sultanate of Bengal for a short time
- Jam Feroz (died 1535/36), last ruler of the Samma Dynasty of Sindh
- Alauddin Firuz Shah II (died 1533), three-month ruler of the Sultanate of Bengal
- Pherozeshah Mehta (1845-1915), Indian Parsi politician and lawyer
- Peruz (1866-1920), Ottoman Armenian kanto singer

== Modern-day people ==
- Fairuz (born 1934/35), a Lebanese singer
- Farooq Feroze Khan (1939-2021), a Pakistan Air Force officer
- Feroz, nickname of Arsen Goulamirian (born 1987), Armenian-born French professional boxer
- Feroz Abbasi (born 1979), a British man held in extrajudicial detention in the United States' Guantanamo Bay detainment camps
- Feroz Abbas Khan (born 1959), an Indian theatre and film director, playwright and screenwriter
- Feroz Ahmad (1938–2025), Indian-born Turkish-American academic, historian and political scientist
- Feroz Khan (disambiguation), several people
- Firuz Kanatlı (1932-2017), Turkish businessman, founder of the Eti company.
- Firuz Kazemzadeh (1924-2017), a professor emeritus of history at Yale University
- Pirouz Davani (1961-1998), an Iranian leftist activist
- Pirouz Mojtahedzadeh (born 1946), an Iranian political scientist and historian
- Piruz Dilanchi (born 1965), Azerbaijani activist
- Dinshah Pirosha Madon (1921-1994), Indian judge
- A. S. M. Feroz (born 1952), Bangladeshi chief whip
- Ahmed Firoz Kabir (born 1963), Bangladeshi politician
- KS Firoz (1946-2020), Bangladeshi actor
- Kazi Firoz Rashid (born 1947), Bangladeshi politician
- Firoz Mahmud (born 1974), Bangladeshi visual artist
- Feroz Ahammed Shapon (born 1961), Bangladeshi politician
- M. Feroze Ahmed (born 1945), Bangladeshi vice-Chancellor of Stamford University

== Fictional characters ==
- Feroz, a planeswalker in Magic: The Gathering
- Hajji Firuz, the traditional herald of Nowruz
- Firoze Contractor, a fictional character in the 2019 Indian film War

== See also ==
- Firoza (disambiguation)
- Parvīz, a related name
- Phiroze, a related name
- Feroze, a related name
- Piruzeh, Iran
- Firoz Shah palace complex, archaeological site in Hisar, Haryana, India
