= Bagherzadeh =

Bagherzadeh is an Iranian surname. Notable people with the surname include:

- Firouz Bagherzadeh (1930–2021), Iranian archaeologist and art scholar
- Gelareh Bagherzadeh (1981–2012), medical student and murder victim
- Mansoureh Khojasteh Bagherzadeh (1947–2026), wife of Supreme Leader of Iran Ali Khamenei
- Nader Bagherzadeh (born 1955), American engineer
