= International Iranian Economic Association =

- Abbreviation: IIEA
- Formation: 2010
- Type: Research and Academics
- Legal status: U.S. Public charity under 501(c)(3)
- Headquarters: London, UK
- Website: iraneconomics.org

The International Iranian Economic Association (IIEA) is a private, non-profit, and non-political organization of scholars interested in the study of economic issues concerning Iran, in the broadest sense of the term.

The objectives of the IIEA are:

1. Promotion of high standard economic scholarship and research on Iran's economy
2. Promotion of cooperation among persons and organizations committed to the objectives of IIEA
3. Facilitation of communication among scholars through its webpage, meetings and publications
4. Promotion of better understanding of Iran's economic policy challenges and opportunities.

== Board of directors ==
The Board of Directors of the International Iranian Economic Association (IIEA) consists of:

=== Executive Officers ===
Post	Name	Affiliation
President	Massoud Karshenas	SOAS, University of London
Executive Secretary	Kamiar Mohaddes	University of Cambridge and King's College, Cambridge
Treasurer	Ramin Nassehi	University College London

=== Elected Board Members ===
Name	Affiliation
Nadereh Chamlou	
Ida Mirzaei	Ohio State University
Hamed Ghodousi	Stevens Institute of Technology
Djavad Salehi-Isfahani	Virginia Tech

=== Co-opted Board Members ===
Name	Affiliation
Mohammad R. Farzanegan	Philipps-Universität Marburg

=== Previous Board Members ===
Name	Affiliation
Parvin Alizadeh	London Metropolitan University
Sohrab Behdad	Denison University
Hadi Salehi Esfahani	University of Illinois at Urbana–Champaign
Fatemeh Moghadam	Hofstra University

=== Past Presidents ===
Name	Affiliation
Hashem Pesaran	University of Cambridge and USC
Hassan Hakimian	SOAS, University of London

=== Past Executive Secretaries ===
Name	Affiliation
Hassan Hakimian	SOAS, University of London
Kamiar Mohaddes	University of Cambridge and King's College, Cambridge

=== Past Treasurers ===
Name	Affiliation
Parvin Alizadeh	London Metropolitan University

== Founding members ==
Founding members of the IIEA are:

Name	Title	Affiliation
Parvin Alizadeh	Principal Lecturer in Economics	London Metropolitan University
Jahangir Amuzegar	International Economic Consultant	
Mehdi Asali	Energy Economist	OPEC Secretariat, Vienna and International Institute for Energy Studies (IIES), Tehran
Mohsen Bahmani-Oskooee	Wilmeth Professor and UWM Distinguished Professor in Economics	University of Wisconsin–Milwaukee
Sohrab Behdad	Professor and John E. Harris Chair in Economics	Denison University
Gholamali Farjadi	Labour Economist	Managing director, Taban Kherad Consulting, Tehran
Hossein Farzin	Professor of Economics	University of California, Davis
Fereidun Fesharaki	Chairman and CEO	FACTS Global Energy
Firouz Gahvari	Leiby Hall Endowed Chair and Professor of Economics	University of Illinois at Urbana–Champaign
Nader Habibi	Henry J. Leir Professor of the Economics of the Middle East	Brandeis University
Hassan Hakimian	Director, London Middle East Institute, and Reader in Economics	SOAS, University of London
Ahmad Reza Jalali Naini	Chairman, Department of Economics	Institute for Management and Planning Studies, Tehran
Massoud Karshenas	Professor of Economics	SOAS, University of London
Esfandiar Maasoumi	Arts & Sciences Distinguished Professor of Economics	Emory University
Fatemeh Moghadam	Professor of Economics	Hofstra University
Hamid Mohtadi	Professor of Economics	University of Wisconsin–Milwaukee
Farhad Nomani	Professor of Economics	American University of Paris
Vahid Nowshirvani	Emeritus Professor of Economics	Columbia University
Jamshid Pazhooyan	Professor of Economics	Allameh Tabatabai University
Hashem Pesaran	Professor of Economics	University of Cambridge and USC
Hadi Salehi Esfahani	Professor of Economics	University of Illinois at Urbana–Champaign
Djavad Salehi-Isfahani	Professor of Economics	Virginia Tech
Hossein Samiei	Mission Chief for Portugal	International Monetary Fund
Gholam Reza Soltani	Professor of Economics	Department of Agricultural Economics, Shiraz University
Mohammad Tabibian	Emeritus Professor of Economics	Emeritus Professor, Former Director of The School of Banking, Tehran

== Conferences ==
IIEA has held a series of conferences on the Iranian Economy:

- Conference on Iran's Economy (2008), The University of Illinois at Urbana-Champaign, Illinois, USA, December 11–13, 2008
- Iranian Economy at a Crossroads: Domestic and Global Challenges (2009), University of Southern California, Los Angeles, California, USA, September 18–19, 2009
- Conference on the Iranian Economy (2010), University of Chicago, Illinois, USA, October 15–17, 2010
- First Inaugural Conference on the Iranian Economy (2011), SOAS, University of London, London, UK, December 7–8, 2011
- Second International Conference on the Iranian Economy (2013), Istanbul Bilgi University, Istanbul, Turkey, June 24–25, 2013
- Third International Conference on the Iranian Economy (2014), Boston College, Boston, Massachusetts, USA, 24–25 October 2014
- Fourth International Conference on the Iranian Economy (2016), Center for Near and Middle Eastern Studies, University of Marburg, Marburg (Germany), 17–18 June 2016
- Fifth International Conference on the Iranian Economy (2018), International Institute of Social History, Amsterdam, the Netherlands, March 8–9, 2018
- Sixth International Conference on the Iranian Economy (2019), Department of Asian, African and Mediterranean Studies, Università degli Studi di Napoli "L'Orientale", Naples, Italy, May 16–17, 2019
- Seventh International Conference on Iran’s Economy (2020), Middle Eastern Studies Department, College of Humanities and Social Sciences, Hamad Bin Khalifa University, December 15–17, 2020

== See also ==
- Economy of Iran
