= Paul O'Sullivan =

Paul O'Sullivan may refer to:

- Paul O'Sullivan (diplomat) (born 1948), Australian political adviser and diplomat
- Paul O'Sullivan (actor) (1964–2012), Canadian actor and comedian
- Paul O'Sullivan (horseman) (born 1959), New Zealand racehorse trainer
- Paul O'Sullivan (forensic investigator) (born 1955), Ireland and South African forensic investigator
- The Paul O'Sullivan Band, internationally-based pop/rock band

== See also ==
- Paul Sullivan (disambiguation)
