= M. S. Viswanathan =

Indian actor-musician

M.S.Viswanathan
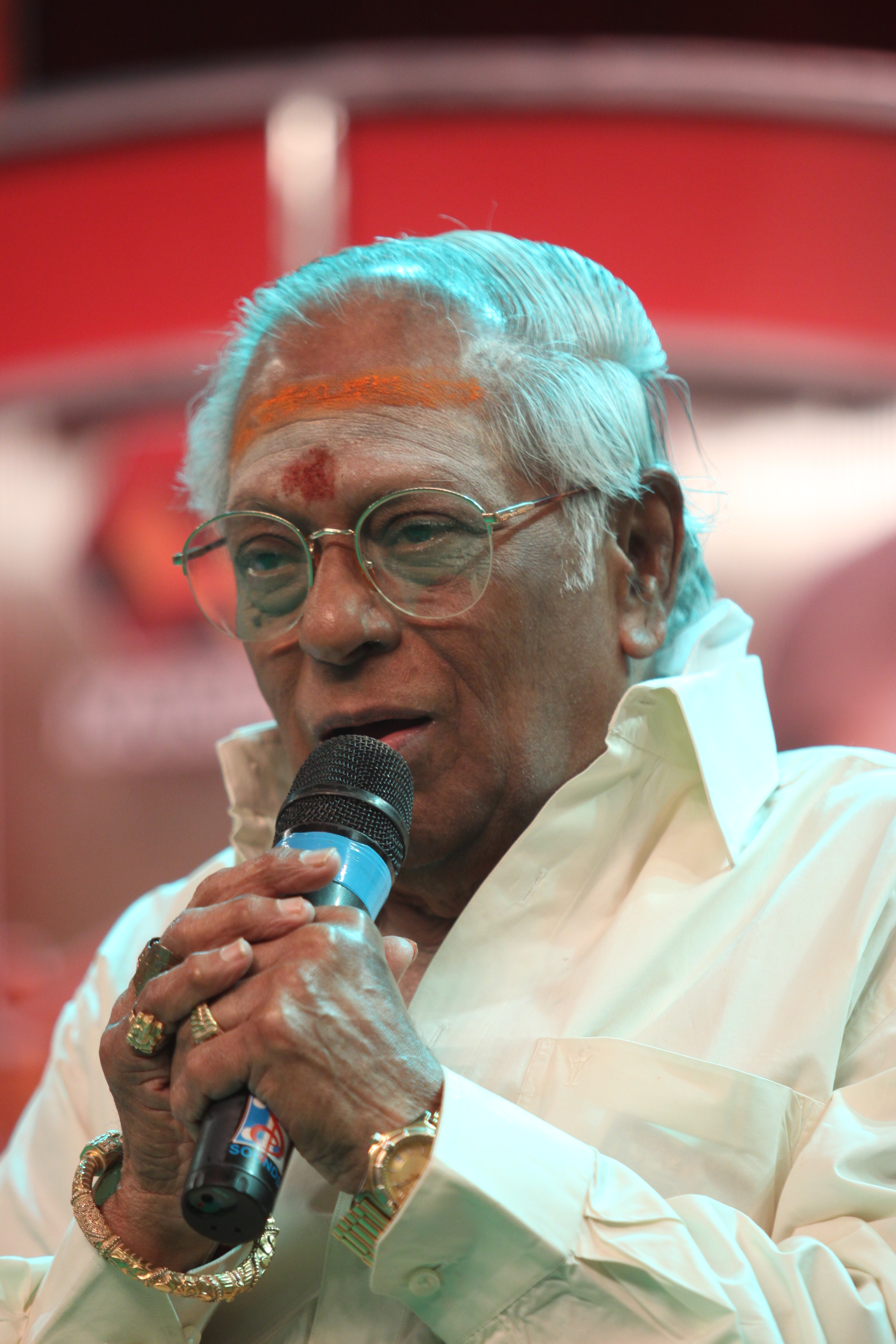
- Born: Manayangath Subramanian Viswanathan; 24 June 1928; Elappully, Malabar District, Madras Presidency, British India (now in Palakkad District, Kerala, India)
- Died: 14 July 2015 (aged 87); Chennai, Tamil Nadu, India
- Other names: M.S.V. Mellisai Mannar, Melody King, Thiraisai Chakravarthi, Isai Kadavul
- Occupations: Film score composer; singer; actor; music director
- Years active: 1940–2015
- Spouse: Yezhuvath Janaki
- Children: 7

Manayangath Subramanian Viswanathan (24 June 1928 – 14 July 2015), also known as M.S.V., was an Indian music director, singer and actor who predominantly worked in Tamil film industry. Popularly known by the sobriquet "Mellisai Mannar" (transl. King of Melody), he composed songs for more than 800 Indian films and various albums across languages primarily in Tamil, Malayalam and Telugu films. He also acted and sung in a few Tamil films. Former Chief Minister of Tamil Nadu J Jayalalithaa conferred the "Thirai Isai Chakravarthy" (transl. The Emperor of Cine Music) title on him in August 2012 and presented him with 60 gold coins and a new car.

Viswanathan composed film music together with composer and violinist T. K. Ramamoorthy from the 1950s to 1965, as Viswanathan–Ramamoorthy for 100 Films. He independently composed for 700 films from 1965 to 2015.

== Life ==
M. S. Viswanathan was born on 24 June 1928 to Manayangath Subramanian and Narayaniammal in Elappully village in Palakkad, Kerala, India (then in Malabar district, Madras Presidency, British India). His father died when Viswanathan was three years old, and subsequently his sister also died six months later. In a depressed state, Viswanathan's mother decided to kill him, and herself to escape from abject poverty and lack of support, by drowning in a pond. Both were saved at the last minute by his grandfather. His grandfather Krishnan Nair was a warden at the central jail of Kannur. After death of his father, his family moved from Palakkad to Kannur to stay with his jailor uncle. As a child, he sold refreshments in a movie theatre without any pay, so he could listen to the music in the films. He had a part in the film Kannagi produced by Jupiter Pictures.

His primary education was at Pallikunnu, Kannur. He would often play truant from school and stand outside the house of Neelakanta Bhagavathar, a local music teacher, and listen to his teaching other students. He learnt to play the harmonium, and Neelakanta Bhagavathar, who heard him play and sing on a Vijayadasami Day, was impressed and organised a three-hour concert at the Kannur town hall. He later gave his first stage performance in Trivandrum at the age of 13. He worked as an office boy for Jupiter Pictures in the 1940s, earning Rs 3 per month.

Viswanathan was married to Janaki and they have four sons and three daughters. His wife, Janaki, died on 14 May 2012. She was 77 when she died.

He is known to have looked after his original Guru, S. M. Subbaiah Naidu, when the latter fell into financial difficulties and then continued to look after his wife until her death. As a rare human approach, M. S. Viswanathan, looked after his friend J. P. Chandrababu, the great Comedian and Singer of Tamil films, when the latter fell into financial ruins. Chandrababu stayed the last few years of his life in the house of M. S. Viswanathan, and as per the request of Chandrababu, M.S.V. arranged his last rites when he died in March 1974.

== Career ==
Viswanathan had always wanted to be an actor and singer, but was not successful. He had a few small roles in stage dramas in the 1940s. The composer and violinist T. R. Papa met Viswanathan, took a liking to him and arranged a job for him as an errand boy for S. V. Venkatraman's musical troupe in 1942. In that company of musicians, Viswanathan realised that he had the inclination and the potential for composing music. He thereafter joined S. M. Subbaiah Naidu and at times assisted him. He then joined C. R. Subburaman's musical troupe as a harmonium player. Here, he met T. K. Ramamoorthy and T. G. Lingappa, the two leading violinists at that time. T. G. Lingappa also became a renowned music composer on his own in the 1950s.

=== Viswanathan–Ramamoorthy ===
In 1952, C. R. Subburaman died unexpectedly. Ramamoorthy and Viswanathan joined and completed the background music for the films Subburaman was working on, including Devadas, Chandirani and Marumagal. N. S. Krishnan knew them both fairly intimately and also their respective talents by then because of his close relationship with C.R. Subburaman, with whom he had worked earlier in several films. Meanwhile, Viswanathan also worked as the third composer for the film Genova where the other composers were M.S Gnanamani and T.K.Kalyanam. MGR, the hero of the film Genova, had reservations about the 'raw, young music director' but the reservations lasted only until he listened to the songs.MGR instantly recognised the arrival of a genius and the relationship lasted until the end of his career as a hero in 1977. Viswanathan and Ramamoorthy were asked to write the music for Panam, a 1952 film produced by A. L. Seenivasan and directed by N. S. Krishnan. Later the duo was asked to do the background score for the film Ratha Kanneer by its music composer C. S. Jayaraman.

The duo composed music for over 100 films, and they worked together from 1952 to 1965.

On 16 June 1963 at a special function M. S. Viswanathan and T. K. Ramamoorthy were each given the title of Mellisai Mannar (Kings of the Light Music). It was granted by Sivaji Ganesan at the Madras Triplicane Cultural Academy. The function was supported and facilitated by the Hindu Group of Publications, especially Mr. T. M. Ramachandran, Director C. V. Sridhar and Chitralaya Gopu.

The duo parted in 1965 after release of Ayirathil Oruvan and since then they composed for films individually. After 29 years, they rejoined in 1995 for the Tamil film Engirundho Vanthan starring Sathyaraj.

P. Susheela received her first National Award as Best Singer in 1969 for the song "Paal Polave" composed by M.S.V. in the film Uyarndha Manidhan. Immediately after recording the song, M.S.V. was so happy, he said to P. Susheela that she would be acclaimed as the Best Singer for the National Award for this song.

The duo Viswanathan Ramamoorthy were awarded an honorary doctorate by the Sathyabama Deemed University in September 2006.

J. Jayalalithaa, the Chief Minister of Tamil Nadu, conferred the title Thirai Isai Chakravarthy (Emperors of the Cine Music) on Viswanathan and Ramamoorthy in August 2012 and presented them with 60 gold coins and a new car.

Viswanathan Ramamoorthy duo were the first musicians to arrange a stage performance of the film singers and live orchestra in India. Until then only traditional Carnatic music and Hindustani classical music was performed live in any function. This became a trend setter and paved the way not only for the birth of many musical troops, but also for knowing, understanding and learning about the western instruments among millions of Indians.

=== Independent music director ===
M. S. Viswanathan began his solo career in 1965. Viswanathan is known for having incorporated various genres of world music into Indian cinema music. He used elements such as humming and whistling in his songs, and blended new trends such as western music and disco with Indian classical tunes. Some of his films as solo music composer include Idhayakani, Gallatta Kalyanam, Chandrodhyam, Kannan En Kadhalan, Dheiva Magan, Nimrundhu Nil, Rickshakaran, Ulagam Sutrum Vaaliban, and Urumai Kural. M. S. Viswanathan also scored music for many non-film albums and for political campaigns.

He also did playback singing, including 500 songs composed by himself and over 200 songs composed by music directors. He performed songs such as Sollathan Ninaikiren, Inbathilum Thunbathilun Sirithidu Magaley, Yenakkoru Kaathalai Irukindral, Sangamam and Vidaikodu Engal Nadey.

Viswanathan worked with many different film directors, including B. R. Panthulu, S. S. Vasan, B. S. Ranga, and Krishnan–Panju in the 1950s, and in later decades with C. V. Sridhar, A. Bhimsingh, Madhavan, T. R. Ramanna, A. C. Trilogchander, K. Shankar, K. Balachander, Muktha Srinivasan, Chitralaya Gopu, Cho Ramaswamy, and K. S. Gopalakrishnan from the 1960s. From the 1970s directors such as S. P. Muthuraman, Major Sundarrajan, Bhagyaraj, D. Yoganand, C. V. Rajendran, P. Madhavan, K. S. Prakash Rao, Vietnam Veedu Sundaram, N. T. Rama Rao, and I. V. Sasi frequently worked with Viswanathan; later, in the 1980s and 1990s, new directors such as Visu, Mouli, Komal Swaminathan, and K. Raghunath collaborated with Viswanathan regularly.

He worked with a number of singers, both younger artists and more established ones, including P Leela, P. Susheela, L. R. Eswari, T. M. Soundararajan, and the Malayalam singer Jayachandran. He is also considered responsible for making singers like S. P. Balasubrahmanyam and Vani Jairam, R. Balasaraswathi, S. Janaki, A. L. Raghavan, Sirkazhi Govindarajan and K. J. Yesudas popular names. He gave Swarnalatha her first job as a playback singer when she was 14 years old. M.S.V. has given great life by giving opportunity and support for many musicians, lyricists, singers etc. Lyricist Vaali quoted in 1984, "Until I met Viswanathan Sir, I had no money to have any food. But from the moment I met Viswanathan Sir I had no time to have food".

His notable musical works from 1980s to 1990s included - Polladhavan, Avan Aval Adhu, Billa, Mazhalai Pattalam, Varumayin Niram Sigappu (1980), Antha Ezhu Natkal (1981), Kizhvanam Sivakkam (1981), Thaneer Thaneer (1981), Thillu Mullu (1981), Sathyam Sundaram (1981), Simla Special (1982), Pokkiri Raja (1982), Saranalayam (1983), Mridanga Chakravarthi (1983), Puyalkadantha Boomi (1984), Idanilangal (1985), Sugamana Ragangal, Vasantha Ragam (1986), Sattam Oru Vilayattu (1987), Samrat Ashok (1992), Manikantana Mahime (1993), Vetri Vinayagar (1996), Amma Ammayiamma (1998).

M. S. Viswanathan went on to act in Tamil feature films after 1995, notably appearing in Kaadhal Mannan after being convinced to do so by actor Vivek and Director Saran while he also starred in Kamal Haasan's Kaathala Kaathala and Karthik's Rojavanam. He also made appearances in other films and television series like Kalki, since 1995.

Since 1996, Viswanathan focused on composing devotional music and serving as a judge in Malayalam and Tamil TV reality shows. He collaborated with Ilaiyaraaja in 'Mella Thiranthathu Kathathavu', 'Senthamizh Paatu', 'Vishwa Thulsi' and 'Senthamizh Selvan' starring Prashanth. He sang the song "Vidai Kodu Engal Naadae" for 2002 Tamil film "Kannathil Muthamittal" composed by A.R.Rahman. Then in 2013 he sang for the film Neelam – the song called 'Alayae o Alayae' and it was recorded in the supervision of music composer Satish Chakravarthy. According to director Kumar G. Venkatesh, this was the last song sung by M.S.V. He in 2013 composed music for the film Thillu Mullu, with Yuvan Shankar Raja While M. S. Viswanathan composed the tunes in the 2013 Thillu Mullu film, Yuvan Shankar Raja orchestrated and recorded them. He sang the song 'Saami Namba saami' penned by Snehan for the film "Mannar Valaikuda", composed by S.Siva Pragasam.

Rajnikanth said in an interview about M. S. Viswanathan, "You will rarely find someone like MSV in any industry. He lived life like a selfless saint, free from jealousy and lies. He was behind the success of legends like MGR and Sivaji. If not for MSV, the careers of filmmaker Balachander, lyricists Vaali and Kannadasan wouldn't have tasted huge success."

== Death ==
On 27 June 2015, Viswanathan was admitted to Fortis Malar hospital in Chennai with breathing difficulties. He had been undergoing a treatment at the hospital for some time. He died on 14 July 2015 due to age-related ailments, three weeks after he had turned 87. He was cremated with full state honours at Besant Nagar Electric Crematorium.

== Awards ==
M. S. Viswanathan has won many awards include the following:

- 1968: Lakshmi Kalyanam - Tamil Nadu State Film Award for Best Music Director
- 1970: Received title of Kalaimamani Award by the Government of Tamil Nadu, which is the highest state honour in the field of Arts.
- 1974: Kerala State Film Award for Best Music Director - Chandrakantham, Jeevikkan Marannupoya Sthree.
- 1978: Nandi Award for Best Music Director for Naalaga Endaro.
- 1999: Gnana Kala Bharathi by Bharat Kalachar.
- 2001: Filmfare Lifetime Achievement Award – South
- 2002: Tamil Nadu State Film Honorary Award - Kannadasan Award.
- 2002: Lifetime achievement award by Soorya Film and stage Association Kerala.
- 2004: Isai Sangam honoured him with Isai Peraringnar, meaning "Great Scholar in Music".
- 2005: Dr. Sivaji Ganesan Memorial award by Sivaji Prabhu Charitable trust.
- 2005: Won Gold Remi Award for the best music score for movie Vishwa Thulasi.
- 2006: Paramacharya Award, meaning 'The Ultimate Guru'.
- 2006: Doctorate conferred by Sathyabama University.
- Seventh Kamukura Award – given by Kerala Cultural Ministry.
- 'Sangeetha Saraswathi' by Poojya Sri Guruji Viswanath of Manava Seva Kendra.
- 2013: PBS Puraskar Award presented by Aruna Nithya Gopal Foundation awarded at Ravindra Bharati
- 2008: SICA Lifetime achievement award by SICA South India Cinematographers association.
- 2009: Isai Nayagan by Bharathi Abu Dhabi.
- 2013: Honorary doctorate from Tirunelveli-based Manonmaniam Sundaranar University (MSU).
- 2013: Asiavision Awards - Lifetime Achievement Award
