= Marianne Thamm =

South African writer and comedian

- Born: 12 March 1961 (age 65); United Kingdom
- Education: Technikon Pretoria
- Occupations: Journalist, broadcaster, author, stand-up comedian
- Employer: Daily Maverick

Marianne Thamm (born 12 March 1961) is a South African journalist, author and stand-up comedian. She is the assistant editor of the Daily Maverick and has written several books. In 2016, she released the memoir, Hitler, Verwoerd, Mandela and me.

== Background ==
Thamm was born in England where her German father had been a prisoner of war and met Thamm's mother, a Portuguese domestic worker. Thamm describes herself as a “half-Portuguese, half-German, recovering Roman Catholic atheist lesbian immigrant”. She lives in Cape Town with her partner and two daughters.

=== Madlanga Commission ===
In 2026 Thamm's name was mentioned at the Madlanga Commission relating to cross examination and evidence against suspended law enforcement officer Feroz Khan (police officer). Thamm wrote of police corruption and was one of the people whose name came up between the chats of Khan and his colleagues. Thamms home was broken into two months later after Khan's colleague sent the message that read “Counter needs to be activated on this journo.”.

== Selected works ==
List of selected works by Marianne Thamm.

- It's Me, Anna (Translator)
- I Have Life: Raped, Stabbed & Left for Dead (about Alison Botha, a rape and attempted murder survivor)
- The Lost Boys of Bird Island: A shocking exposé from within the heart of the NP government (Foreword)
- De ondraaglijke blankheid van het bestaan. Een bewogen leven in het land van Mandela
- To Catch a Cop: The Paul O'Sullivan (forensic investigator) Story
- Here I Am (with PJ Powers)
- Shooting the moon: A hostage story
- The Last Right: Craig Schonegevel’s Struggle to Live and Die with Dignity
- The How to Be a South African Handbook: An Irreverant Cultural Guide for Tourists and Confused Locals
- Trotzdem weiterleben - Eine junge Frau bewältigt die schlimmste Erfahrung ihres Lebens
- Fairlady Collection
- Mental Floss
