= Firoza =

Firoza may refer to:

== Places ==
- Firoza, Rahim Yar Khan, a town in Punjab, Pakistan

== People with the given name ==
- Firoza Begum (actress) (fl. 1930s), Jewish Indian actress
- Firoza Begum (singer) (1930–2014), Bangladeshi singer
- Firoza Zaman (fl. 1986), Bangladeshi politician

== See also ==
- Feroz (disambiguation)
- Firozabad, a city in Firozabad district, Uttar Pradesh, India
