= Palazzo Corpi =

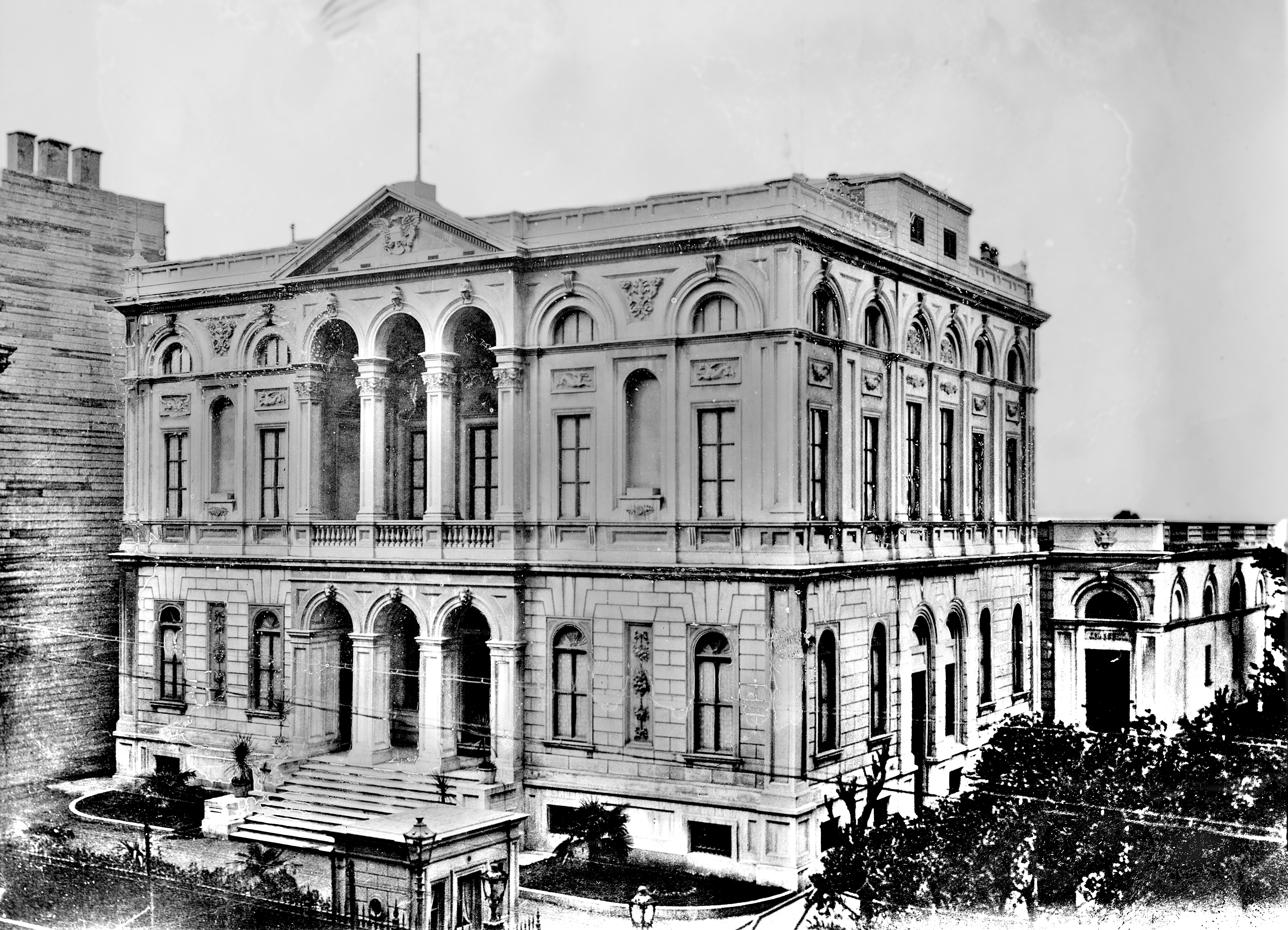
- Palazzo Corpi in 1920

General information
- Status: Hotel and conference center
- Type: Palazzo, former embassy
- Location: Evliya Çelebi Mahallesi, 34430, Beyoğlu, Istanbul, Turkey
- Current tenants: Soho House
- Construction started: 1873
- Completed: 1882
- Renovated: 1937, 2014
- Cost: 99,000 liras
- Renovation cost: $12 million
- Client: Soho House
- Owner: United States

Design and construction
- Architect: Giacomo Leoni

The Palazzo Corpi is a 19th-century palazzo in Istanbul, Turkey. The historical building was built for Genoese merchant Ignazio Corpi by Italian architect Giacomo Leoni between 1873 and 1882. The property was bought by the United States government in 1907 to serve as the American embassy in Turkey, and from 1937 to 2003 the Palazzo Corpi housed the Consulate General of the United States of America in Turkey. The US government leased the building in 2014 to Soho House, which currently occupies the structure. The palazzo holds the distinction of being the first diplomatic premises owned by the United States government in Europe, as well as being one of the first diplomatic buildings to be purchased by the United States.

== History ==
The Palazzo Corpi was built in the late 19th century at the behest of Ignazio Corpi, a wealthy Genoese shipowner who had established his business in the Beyoğlu district of Istanbul. Corpi employed Italian architect Giacomo Leoni to build the palazzo. He also commissioned Georgio Stampa, an architect who had worked on several national embassies in Istanbul, to assist Leoni. Construction began in 1873 and concluded in 1882. The costs associated with the project were recorded as being 99,000 liras. Ignazio Corpi himself died in 1882, shortly before the building was completed.

=== United States ownership ===
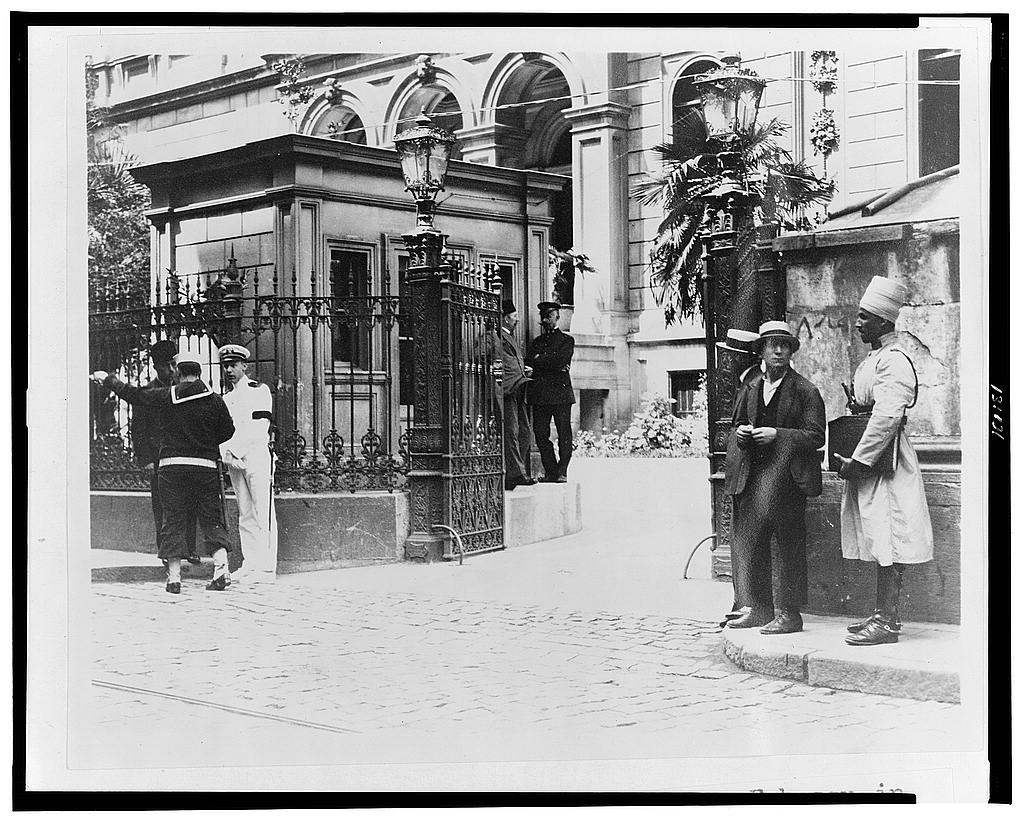
Entrance of the US Embassy in Constantinople, 1923

The United States legation to the Ottoman Empire began leasing the Palazzo Corpi from the Corpi family in 1882. The structure was purchased outright by John George Alexander Leishman in 1907, who was at the time the United States Ambassador to Turkey. Leishman bought the palazzo using 28,000 liras of his own money on the assumption that he would be reimbursed for his expenditure. However, the United States government refused to compensate Leishman for the property, considering the purchase to be a personal expense. In response, Leishman invited a number of members of Congress to a party at which a poker game was played. While playing one hand of poker, Leishman bet some of his competitors that, if he won, the government would reimburse him for his acquisition of the Palazzo Corpi. Leishman won, and the United States government reimbursed Leishman, and in doing so officially acquired the Palazzo Corpi as its embassy in Turkey. In the words of Thomas J. Carolan, Jr. of the American Foreign Service Association, "Palazzo Corpi thereby acquired the unique distinction of being the first and only U.S. diplomatic premises to be won in a poker game." In addition to becoming an administrative hub, the palazzo also became the official residence of the United States ambassador to the Ottoman Empire. In 1908 a wing of the building was converted into offices for the chancery.

Following the designation of Ankara as Turkey's capital in 1923, the United States began to transfer diplomatic facilities to the new capital. The embassy of the United States in Turkey was moved to Ankara in 1937, and the Palazzo Corpi became the U.S. Consulate General. The building continued in this role until 2003, when security risks prompted the consulate to move its location. In 2004 the Hollings Center was founded with the intent to foster dialogue between the United States and the nations of the Middle East. One of the goals of the organization is to maintain the Palazzo Corpi.

=== Current occupancy ===
In 2014 the United States agreed to lease the palazzo to Soho House, a hotel club. Soho House then refurbished parts of the building at a cost of $12 million. These renovations were finished in 2015, after which the Palazzo Corpi became a hotel and conference center. The building continues to house office space for the Hollings Center's operations in Turkey.

== Design ==
=== Exterior ===
The Palazzo Corpi was designed by Giacomo Leoni in the style of a neoclassical Italian palazzo.

=== Decoration ===
The palazzo is richly adorned with materials imported from Italy, such as marble flooring and facings from Carrara. The main hall of the residence is decorated with frescoes depicting figures from Greek and Roman mythology, as well as other classical figures. These frescoes were painted over when the building was renovated in 1937, but have since been restored.

=== As a hotel ===
As a hotel the Palazzo Corpi (in addition to adjacent buildings also leased by Soho House) features 87 rooms, two restaurants, a public space adjacent to the main building, and a bar.
