= Feroz Khan =

Feroz Khan, Firoz Khan or Feroze Khan may refer to:

- Feroz Khan (actor) (1939–2009), Indian actor and film director
- Feroz Khan (police officer), South African police officer and deputy head of intelligence
- Feroze Khan (born 1990), Pakistani VJ, television actor, and model
- Feroze Khan (field hockey) (1904–2005), Pakistani hockey player, and Olympic gold medalist
- Feroz Khan of Malerkotla (1616-1672), ruler of the Indian princely state of Malerkotla
- Firoz Khan, Indian television actor
- Feroz Abbas Khan (born 1959), Indian theatre and film director
- Farooq Feroze Khan (1939–2021), Chairman joint chiefs and the Pakistan Air Force general
- Firoz Khan, one of the perpetrators of the 1993 Bombay bombings
- Feroze Ali Khan, fictional spymaster portrayed by Danny Denzongpa in the 2015 Indian film Baby and its 2017 sequel Naam Shabana

== See also ==
- Firoz Khan Noon (1893–1970), Pakistani politician and 8th Prime Minister of Pakistan
