= Nader Habibi =

Iranian-American economist

- Citizenship: Iranian-American
- Education: Michigan State University (PhD)
- Known for: works on sanctions against Iran and impact of the Arab Spring and Middle East-China Economic Relations
- Scientific career
- Fields: economics
- Workplaces: Brandeis University; Global Insight
- Thesis: The Economic Consequences of Interest-Free (Islamic) Banking Systems (1987)
- Doctoral advisor: Norman Philip Obst

Nader Habibi is an Iranian-American economist and Henry J. Leir Professor of Practice in the Economics of the Middle East at Brandeis University.

== Career ==
Habibi received his PhD in economics from Michigan State University in 1987. Since then, He has served in academic and research institutions in Iran, Turkey and the United States. Before joining Brandeis University in June 2007, he worked at Global Insight as managing director of economic forecasting and risk analysis for Middle East and North Africa. Habibi is a member of the board of directors of Hollings Center and a founding member of International Iranian Economic Association.

== Research ==
Habibi's research focuses on the political economy of the Middle East, including international economic sanctions, labour markets, and economic relations between China and the Middle Eastern countries.

In 2025, Habibi and economist Mohammad Reza Farzanegan coauthored a study published in the European Journal of Political Economy examining the effects of international sanctions on the size of Iran's middle class.

== Books ==
- Three Stories One Middle East. Waltham: Self-published, 2014, ISBN 9781501031083
- Atul's Quest. 2014
