= Hollings Center =

American non-governmental organization

Hollings Center for International Dialogue
- Formation: 2004
- Type: NGO
- Headquarters: Washington, D.C., United States
- Executive Director: Michael J. Carroll
- Website: www.hollingscenter.org

The Hollings Center for International Dialogue is a non-profit, non-governmental organization dedicated to fostering dialogue between the United States and countries with predominantly Muslim populations in the Middle East, North Africa, South Asia, Eurasia and Europe. In pursuit of this mission, the Hollings Center convenes dialogue conferences that generate new thinking on important international issues and deepen channels of communication across opinion leaders and experts.

== History ==
The conception of the Hollings Center emerged from two primary objectives. First was the need for an organization focused on opening and reinforcing networks and connections between the US and the predominantly Muslim world, particularly in the post-9/11 environment. Second was a strong desire to preserve the Palazzo Corpi, the historic former U.S. Consulate in Istanbul, Turkey. The Hollings Center was established as a non-governmental organization by the U.S. Congress in 2004, primarily through the efforts of Senators Ernest F. Hollings (D-SC) and Judd Gregg (R-NH). Specifically, Congress called on the center to "develop programs of cooperative study, training and research for students and scholars to exchange views and ideas" between the United States and the Muslim world. Congress also specifically designated that this center would occupy the Palazzo Corpi. Located in Istanbul's historic Beyoğlu neighborhood (formerly Pera), the Palazzo Corpi housed the official U.S. presence in Istanbul until 2003. It is one of the US' oldest diplomatic holdings and the Hollings Center was created in part to ensure that the historic Palazzo would remain part of the United States' international heritage.

A steering committee, led by the Council of American Overseas Research Centers, developed a series of dialogue conferences to serve as the Hollings Center's signature program. Three categories of dialogue conferences emerged: Next Generation Dialogues, Regional Policy Dialogues and Higher Education Dialogues. In addition, a small grants program was created in conjunction with dialogue conferences, awarding conference participants modest sums to fund projects building on dialogue topics. More recently, the center has begun a Speaker Series to expand upon dialogue outcomes to a broader public audience.

The center began operations in 2005, holding its first dialogue conference in May of that year. Since then, the Hollings Center has held roughly 30 Dialogue Conferences, hosting over 600 participants from about 40 countries. The Hollings Center has awarded over US$200000 to previous participants to fund more than 25 small grants, establishing networks with hundreds of additional stakeholders. Officially named the International Center for Middle Eastern-Western Dialogue, the center is more commonly known as the Hollings Center, in recognition of Senator Hollings whose efforts were crucial to its foundation. Senator Hollings retired in 2005 having achieved a notable 39-year career in the U.S. Senate.

The Hollings Center is registered as a non-profit, tax-exempt 501(c)(3) organization in the United States and as a foreign non-profit organization in Turkey. The board of directors is currently led by Ambassador Nicholas A. Veliotes, former Assistant Secretary of State for Near Eastern Affairs.

== Members of the Board of Directors ==
=== Emeritus Members ===
- Ernest F. Hollings (Hon., Founding Chair)
- Stephen J. Solarz (Hon.)

=== Active Members ===
- Deborah K. Jones (Ambassador, retired, chair)
- Kate Eltrich (Treasurer)
- Richard A. Detweiler
- John A. Gastright
- Nader Habibi
- Steve Hartell

== Namesake ==
The center is named for the late U.S. Senator Ernest F. "Fritz" Hollings
