= Eti (company) =

Turkish food company

Eti Food Producing and Trade S.A
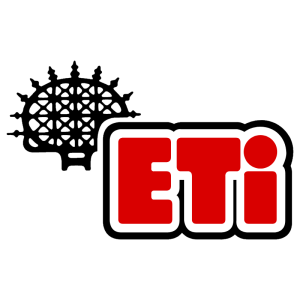
- Type: Anonim şirket
- Industry: Biscuits, waffers, chocolate, breakfast foods
- Founded: 1962; 64 years ago
- Headquarters: Eskişehir, Turkey
- Key people: Firuz Kanatlı
- Revenue: ▲$1.3 billion (2023)
- Number of employees: 7,438 (2023)
- Website: etietieti.com

Eti or legally Eti Food Producing and Trade S.A (Turkish: Eti Gıda Sanayi ve Ticaret A.Ş.) is a Turkish food company that was founded by Firuz Kanatlı in 1962.

== History ==
Eti was founded in 1962 by Firuz Kanatlı. The company uses the Hittite sun disk as their logo. The name "Eti" is also a synonym for Hittite in Turkish.

In 2003, Kanatlı started "a new era" in production facilities to improve efficiency, which he called a "civil war".

During his only interview, Firuz Kanatlı explained that in 1996, the company was required to ask permission and pay taxes to the Gülen movement if they wanted to continue selling their products in Istanbul. The company changed their distributor in the city to avoid the movement.

Since the death of Firuz Kanatlı in October 2017, his son Firuzhan Kanatlı has been the chairman of the company.

In 2021, the company had 9 production facilities and employed over 7,000 workers.

It is mainly known for Turkey's first fibrous biscuit Burçak and small-sized cake Eti Popkek. Eti started producing dairy products in 2014. Eti owns milk products such as Süt Burger, Pastamia, Sosbom and Mousse. Eti has more than 150 different types of products.

In December 2021, Eti changed the name of one of its products called Negro, a cream-filled chocolate biscuit similar to Oreo, to Nero. The change was made because the word was "used as an expression of discrimination in some countries." The previous name meant "black" in Spanish, while the new one means the same in Italian.

In November 2025, Eti acquired the Vancouver-headquartered plant-based snack company, Trubar for approximately $142 million.

== Awards and sponsorships ==
Eti won the "Most Loved Companies" awards organized by the Capital magazine in 2013 and 2014 as the most loved chocolate and biscuit company. Eti sponsors the Turkish football team Eskişehirspor.
