= Phiroze =

Phiroze is a male Indian Parsi name derived from middle Persian Pērōz (meaning victorious, triumphant or prosperous). The spelling of the name has many variations such as Pheroz, Pheroze, Phiroz, etc. but their pronunciation is the same.

== People named Phiroze ==
- Phiroze Jamshedji Jeejeebhoy (1915–1980), Indian businessman
- Phiroze Palia (1910–1981), Indian cricketer
- Phiroze Sethna (1866–1938), Indian politician
- Phiroz Mehta (1902–1994), Indian writer
- Pherozeshah Mehta (1845–1915), Indian politician

== See also ==
- Piruz (disambiguation)
- Peroz (disambiguation)
- Parviz
- Feroz
