= Paul Sullivan =

Paul Sullivan may refer to:

- Paul Sullivan (composer) (born 1955), American composer and writer
- Paul Sullivan (footballer) (1937–2023), Australian footballer
- Paul Sullivan (radio) (1957–2007), former radio talk show host for WBZ in Boston
- Paul Sullivan (tennis) (born 1941), American tennis player
- Paul E. Sullivan, U.S. Navy admiral

== See also ==
- Paul O'Sullivan (disambiguation)
