= Firoz Chuttipara =

Indian YouTuber

- Born: Firoz Chuttipara; 5 May 1984 (age 42), Elappully, Palakkad, Kerala, India
- Occupation: YouTuber

YouTube information
- Channels: Village Food Channel; Travel Master
- Years active: 2018–present
- Genre: Cooking
- Subscribers: 9.16 million (Village Food Channel); 1.84 million (Travel Master)
- Views: 2.08 billion (Village Food Channel); 123 million (Travel Master)
- Last updated: 19 June 2026

Firoz Chuttipara (born 5 May 1984) is an Indian YouTuber from Kerala, India. He is known for his YouTube channel Village Food Channel, where he makes food-related videos.

== Early life and career ==
Chuttipara was born in Elappully village in Palakkad, Kerala. Firoz worked as a welder in Saudi Arabia from 2007 to 2012. After returning home in 2012, he did not feel like going back. Then he started a photostat shop in his hometown. In 2018, he launched a YouTube channel called Craft Media but the revenue from the shop was not enough.

He started publishing cooking videos on his channel and the channel grew quickly. Months later, the Craft Media channel was renamed the Village Food Channel. Later he started another YouTube channel called Travel Master and started making travel-related videos. In 2021, he won the award for best food vlogger in the 24 News Social Media Awards.

== Awards ==
Year	Award	Category	Result	Ref.
2021	24 News Social Media Awards	Best Food Vlogger	Won	
