= Firuz Husayn =

7th century Iranian aristocrat

Firuz Husayn was an Iranian aristocrat, who was a key figure in the rebellion of Abd al-Rahman ibn Muhammad ibn al-Ash'ath, which lasted from 700 to 703.

== Biography ==
A native of Sistan, Firuz Husayn belonged to a "munificent and well-known" family, which it traced its descent back to the Sasanian era. Firuz Husayn is first mentioned as a client and secretary of Husayn ibn Abd-Allah al-Anbari of the Banu Tamim. He later adopted his patron's name, hence the name "Husayn". Firuz Husayn later became a client of Abd al-Rahman ibn Muhammad ibn al-Ash'ath. In 700, Abd al-Rahman ibn Muhammad ibn al-Ash'ath rebelled against the Umayyad Caliphate, with Firuz Husayn leading the rebels. This made the Arab statesman al-Hajjaj ibn Yusuf put a price (10,000 dirhams) on Firuz Husayn's head. After Ibn al-Ash'ath was defeated in 703, Firuz Husayn retreated to Khurasan, but was captured by Yazid ibn al-Muhallab and sent to al-Hajjaj, who had him tortured to death.

== Sources ==
- Zakeri, Mohsen (1995). Sasanid Soldiers in Early Muslim Society: The Origins of 'Ayyārān and Futuwwa. Otto Harrassowitz Verlag. pp. 1–391. ISBN 3447036524.
