= Pirooz Kalayeh =

American film director

- Occupations: Film director, screenwriter, writer
- Years active: 1996–present

Pirooz Kalayeh is an Iranian-American film director, screenwriter, and writer. He is known for The Human War (2011), Shoplifting from American Apparel (2012), Brad Warner's Hardcore Zen (2013), Zombie Bounty Hunter M.D. (2015), and Sometimes I Dream in Farsi (2021).

== Career ==
Kalayeh's early interest was in music and he sang for Cecil’s Water, playing shows with The Toasters, Ruder Than You, The Verge, and Spindrift—the latter of which appear in his film Zombie Bounty Hunter M.D. and who he has also directed in several music videos, including "Jackhammer" for their Classic Soundtracks Vol. 3 with Alternative Tenetacles.

In 2008, Pirooz left Hollywood for a two-year exploration of South Korea, where he produced Transistor Radio with musical group The Slipshod Swingers, interviewed artists and filmmakers on his blog Shikow, and wrote the screenplay that would lead to his eventual return stateside for a directorial debut.

In 2012, Pirooz's first feature SHOPLIFTING FROM AMERICAN APPAREL was released by Indie Screen and played to select theaters across America. The film received mixed reviews for its meta-approach: Benoit Lelievre extolled the film for requiring "every bit of your wits" and not being a "sit-and-watch, turn-your-brain-off movie"; VICE criticized the film "as a total lack of substance covered up with gimmicks"; The Village Voice commented that "Kalayeh and co. can be credited with capturing much of the tone of the novella".

His documentary feature about Buddhist teacher Brad Warner BRAD WARNER’S HARDCORE ZEN (2013) premiered at the Buddhist Film Festival in Amsterdam on 5 October 2013, and played in select theaters across the United States and Europe, and was featured in major Buddhist publications and city papers, such as Lion's Roar, The Daily Camera, and Nomos Journal.

THE HUMAN WAR (2011) was co-produced and co-directed by Pirooz Kalayeh and Thomas Henwood and premiered at the Beloit International Film Festival on 21 February 2014. The film received a Best Screenplay Award and played in double screenings across America with Hardcore Zen.

ZOMBIE BOUNTY HUNTER M.D. premiered at On Vous Ment Film Festival in Lyon, France on 24 May 2016.

His documentary feature SOMETIMES I DREAM IN FARSI has garnered several awards, including Best Refugee, Indigenous, Storytelling at the Social Change International Film Festival, Best Participatory Documentary Feature at the Lonely Wolf International Film Festival, and Best Documentary Feature at the Katra Film Series.

Coinciding with his professional work in film and television, Pirooz has continued to teach screenwriting, cinema studies, creative writing, acting, and film production courses to a diverse array of students around the globe, including UCLA Extension, Southern Illinois University, The American Musical and Dramatic Academy, and Yonsei University. He is currently an Assistant Professor of Scriptwriting and Film and Media Production at The University of Rochester.

== Filmography ==
Year	English title
2011	The Human War
2012	Shoplifting From American Apparel
2013	Brad Werner's Hardcore Zen
2013	Brunch on the Fourth of July
2014	Zombie Hunter M.D.
2017	Ctrl Alt Del
2017	Blush
2021	Sometimes I Dream in Farsi
