= Parvez Mir =

Pakistani cricketer and television anchor (born 1953)

Cricket information
- Batting: Right-handed
- Bowling: Right-arm fast-medium

International information
- National side: Pakistan

Career statistics
Competition	ODI
Matches	3
Runs scored	26
Batting average	13.00
100s/50s	0/0
Top score	18
Balls bowled	122
Wickets	3
Bowling average	25.66
5 wickets in innings	0
10 wickets in match	0
Best bowling	1/17
Catches/stumpings	2/–
- Source: CricInfo, 3 May 2006

Parvez Jamil Mir (born 24 September 1953) is a Pakistani TV anchor and former professional cricketer who played in the Central Lancashire Leagues for Crompton CC, and in the Bolton League for Egerton, Walkden and Kearsley Cricket Clubs. In amateur club cricket he has played for Vauxhall Mallards, Ingham, and Horsford Cricket Clubs in Norfolk.

Born at Sutrapur in Dacca in what was then East Pakistan, Mir is a journalist and has interviewed many prominent Pakistani politicians and international celebrities. Mir hosts current affairs talk show Q & A With PJ Mir.

His cricket career included three One Day Internationals for Pakistan, two of those appearances at the 1975 World Cup, as well as 80 first-class matches for various teams in Pakistan and England.

He was also the spokesperson for Pakistan's cricket team at the 2007 Cricket World Cup.
