= Parviz Barati =

Iranian author (born 1977)

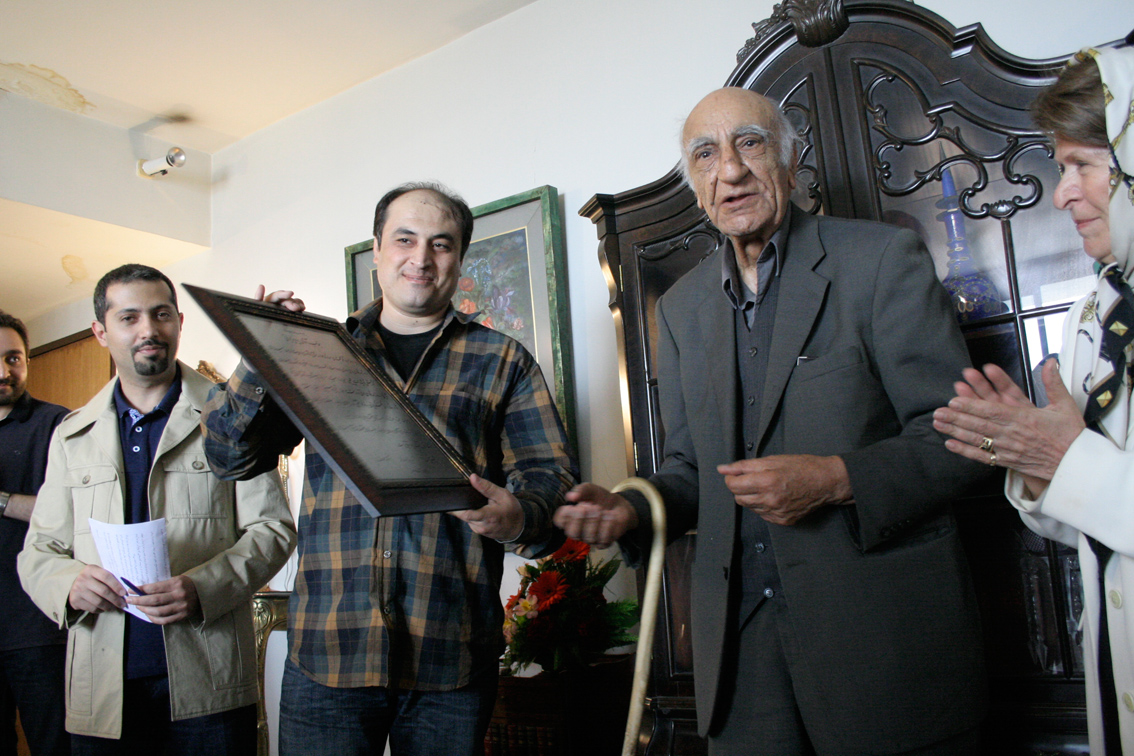
Parviz Barati received the Omid Journalism Prize in 2013 in memory of Dr. Mehdi Samsar for his distinguished role in art journalism.

Parviz Barati (Persian: پرویز براتی, born 22 March 1977) is an Iranian author from Abadan city in the southwest of Iran.

== Early life and education ==
Parviz Barati was born in 1977 in Abadan on the shores of the Persian Gulf, his deep connection to the sea has continuously shaped his interest in maritime narratives and cultural heritage. He is an independent author and researcher specializing in fantastic and folkloric literature, occultism, and wonder writing. His professional journey reflects a lifelong dedication to literature, folklore, and the mystical dimensions of storytelling traditions.

== Career ==
Barati has focused his career on exploring the themes of marvels, occultism, and folkloric literature. His work is recognized for its originality and depth, contributing significantly to the fields of literary analysis and cultural narratives.
