= Pirouz Pirouz =

- Born: Tehran, Iran
- Citizenship: Iranian-American
- Education: Imperial College London (B.Sc., M.Phil., Ph.D.)
- Occupation: Materials scientist
- Known for: Research in electron microscopy, dislocation theory, semiconductor defects, and epitaxial growth
- Scientific career
- Fields: Materials science, electron microscopy, semiconductor materials

Pirouz Pirouz is an Iranian-American materials scientist. He served as Professor of Materials Science and Engineering at Case Western Reserve University from 1990 until his retirement in 2015, after previously serving as associate professor at the same institution. His research has focused on the mechanical and electronic properties of semiconductors and covalent ceramics, high-resolution electron microscopy, and interfaces in advanced materials systems.

== Early life and education ==
Pirouz received his B.Sc., M.Phil., and Ph.D. degrees between 1965 and 1973 from the Department of Metallurgy and Science of Materials at Imperial College London, then part of the University of London. His doctoral research focused on pseudo-Kikuchi patterns in scanning electron microscopy and the dynamical theory of electron diffraction. His Ph.D. thesis examined the geometry and physics of pseudo-Kikuchi patterns, now commonly known as electron backscatter diffraction patterns.

== Career ==
=== Early research career ===
Following completion of his doctorate, Pirouz worked from 1973 to 1974 as a postdoctoral research fellow at the Laboratoire de Thermodynamique et Physico-Chimie Métallurgique, École Nationale Supérieure d'Électrochimie et d'Électrométallurgie, Institut National Polytechnique de Grenoble in France. During this period, he conducted research on weak-beam electron imaging techniques and further developed expertise in transmission electron microscopy.

In 1974, he returned to Iran and joined the University of Tehran as an assistant professor in the Department of Metallurgy, Faculty of Engineering. While teaching metallurgy and materials science courses, he continued to publish work on scanning electron microscopy and diffraction analysis.

=== Stanford University and Oxford ===
In 1978, Pirouz joined Stanford University as a visiting scholar in the Department of Materials Science and Engineering. At Stanford, he conducted research in high-resolution transmission electron microscopy (HRTEM), particularly studying imaging conditions under which HRTEM images correspond closely to atomic arrangements in crystalline materials. Following the Iranian Revolution in 1979, he remained outside Iran and moved to the University of Oxford in 1980 first as a Venture Research Fellow and then as a College Lecturer in Physics.

=== Case Western Reserve University ===
Pirouz joined Case Western Reserve University in 1985 as an associate professor in the Department of Materials Science and Engineering. He was promoted to professor in 1990 and remained at the university until his retirement as an emeritus professor in 2015.

== Research ==
Pirouz's research interests have included the plasticity and fracture of semiconductors, dislocation theory, contrast theory in electron microscopy, heteroepitaxial growth of wide-bandgap semiconductors, and defects in crystalline materials. He has contributed to the understanding of electron diffraction phenomena, semiconductor deformation mechanisms, and imaging methods in high-resolution electron microscopy.

== Awards ==
Fellow of the Royal Microscopy Society

== Selected publications ==
- Pirouz, P.; Cockayne, D. J. H.; Sumida, N.; Hirsch, Peter; Lang, A. R. (April 8, 1983). "Dissociation of Dislocations in Diamond". Proceedings of the Royal Society of London. Series A, Mathematical and Physical Sciences. 386 (1791). The Royal Society: 241–249.
- Hirsch, P.; Pirouz, P.; Roberts, S.; Warren, P. (1986). "Effects of Doping on Mechanical Properties of Semiconductor". Physics, Materials Science, Engineering.
- Pirouz, P. (1989). "Thin Crystal Approximations in Structure Imaging". Acta Crystallographica. 37: 461–471.
- Pirouz, P. (1991). "On Twinning and Polymorphic Transformations in Compound Semiconductors". Scripta Metallurgica. 23: 401–406.
- Pirouz, P.; Hazzledine, P. M. (1991). "Cross-Slip and Twinning in Semiconductors". Scripta Metallurgica et Materialia. 25: 1167–1172.
- Pirouz, P.; Bilde-Sorensen, J.; Lawlor, B.; Geipel, T.; Heuer, A.; Lagerlof, K. P. D. "On Basal Slip and Basal Twinning in Sapphire (Al2O3)". Acta Materialia.
- Pirouz, P. (1993). "Polytypic Transformations in SiC". Ultramicroscopy. 51: 189–214.
- Pirouz, P. (1997). "Polytypic Transformations". Solid State Phenomena. 56: 107–132.
- Pirouz, P.; Chaim, R.; Dahmen, U.; Westmacott, K. H. "Diamond Cubic to Hexagonal Martensitic Transformation in Silicon I". Acta Metallurgica et Materialia: 313–322.
- Pirouz, P.; Chaim, R.; Dahmen, U.; Westmacott, K. H. "Diamond Cubic to Hexagonal Martensitic Transformation in Silicon II". Acta Metallurgica et Materialia: 323–338.
- Pirouz, P.; Chaim, R.; Dahmen, U.; Westmacott, K. H. "Diamond Cubic to Hexagonal Martensitic Transformation in Silicon III". Acta Metallurgica et Materialia: 329–336.
- Pirouz, P.; Samant, A. V.; Hong, M. H.; Moulin; Kubin, L. P. "On Temperature Dependence of Deformation Mechanism and the Brittle–Ductile Transition in Semiconductors". Acta Metallurgica et Materialia.
