= Feroz Rather =

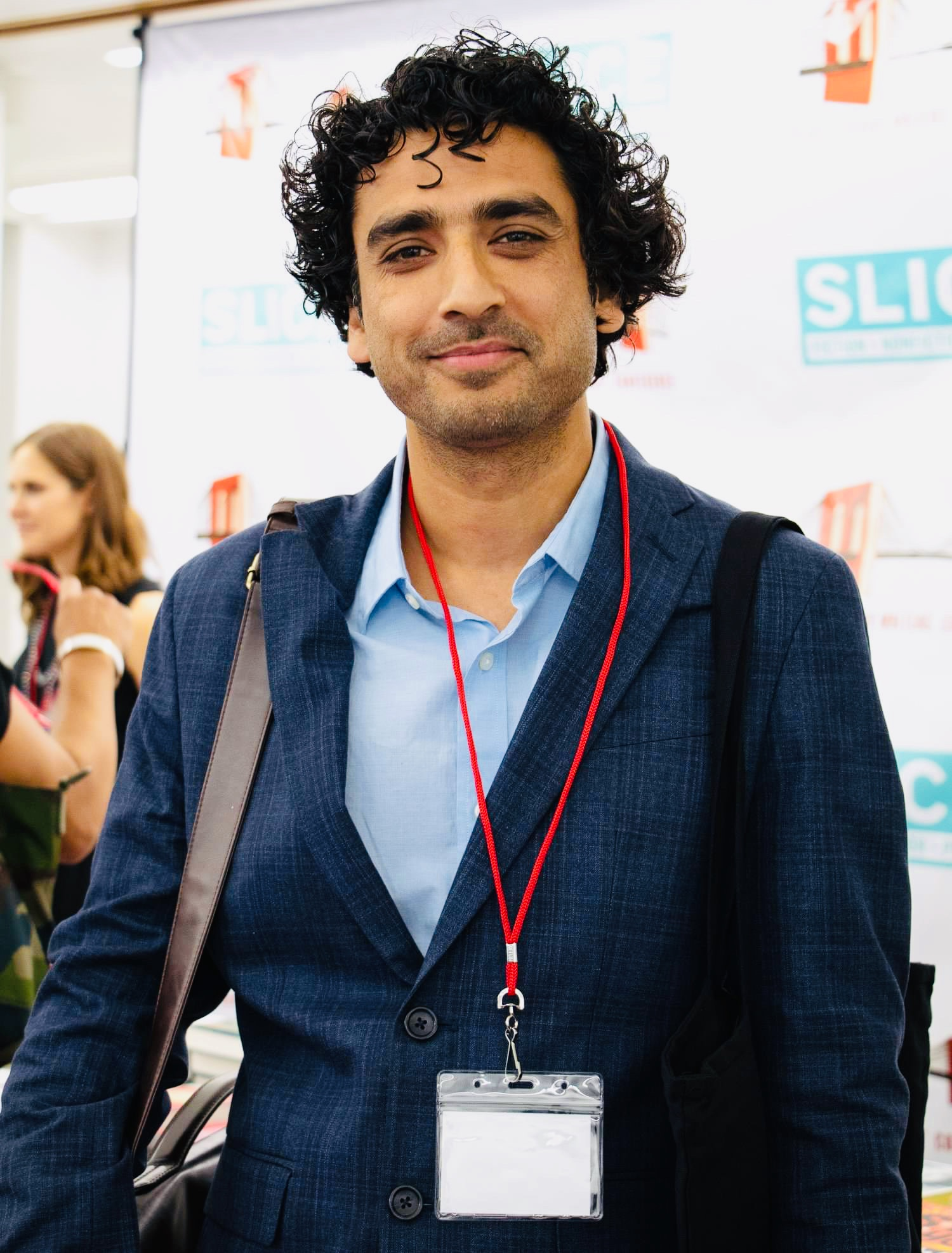
- Rather in New York
- Education: Aligarh Muslim University; Jamia Millia Islamia; California State University Fresno
- Occupation: Fiction writer
- Known for: The Night of the Broken Glass (2018)

Feroz Rather is a novelist and academic who was born in Bumthan, South Kashmir but now lives in Boston.

== Education and career ==
Feroz Rather studied Psychology at Aligarh Muslim University and English literature at Jamia Millia Islamia in New Delhi. He later worked with Random House and wrote features for magazines such as Tehelka and the Caravan before leaving for the US, where he procured his MFA in Creative Writing from California State University Fresno. While working with Palestinian-Egyptian novelist and writer, Randa Jarrar, and Alex Espinoza, he was awarded a William Saroyan Prize in fiction, a Susan O. Memorial Scholarship, a Benck Family Scholarship, and nominated for the Dean's Medalist award for his professional achievements and his excellent dissertation, "The Last Candle and Other Stories," a collection of short stories about Kashmir.

Rather later earned a Ph.D. in creative writing from Florida State University under the guidance of Skip Horack and Elizabeth-Stuckey French. He also attended the workshop of the Pulitzer laureate, Robert Olen Butler, completing his debut novel, The Night of Broken Glass, that was published by HarperCollins in South Asia and nominated for the Tata Literature Live First Book Award by the Ninth Mumbai International Literary Festival.

Rather has served as the Interviews Editor of the Southeast Review and held faculty positions at Ashoka University and Florida State University. Rather is currently a creative writing professor at the Department of Literature and Writing at Simmons University.

== Writing ==
Rather's debut The Night of the Broken Glass, a novel in stories, was released in India in 2018 to positive reviews and lauded by many publications around the world including The Guardian, Literary Hub and The Johannesburg Review of Books. His fiction has been translated to Bengali and more recently to Hebrew by Granta.

Rather has also written biographical essays on Agha Shahid Ali, including "Elephants in Manhattan" in Himal, and "Poet in Srinagar," published in the Michigan University Press anthology, Mad Heart Be Brave.

Among Rather’s more recent contributions is his short story "The Reading Room", which was nominated as a finalist by the prestigious DISQUIETInternational Literary Award. His stories, essays and interviews have appeared in World Literature Today, Carve, Chicago Review of Books, The Common, Kenyon Review, The Ploughshares Blog, The Millions, The Rumpus, and Caravan.

Rather is currently working on a novel project, The Derby Shoe, for which he was awarded a Hazel Dick Leonard Faculty fellowship by Simmons University.

== Books ==
- The Night of Broken Glass (2018), ISBN 978-9352641611
