= Feroz Khan (police officer) =

South African police officer

Major General Feroz Khan (born c. 1970) is a former senior South African law enforcement official who served as the deputy head of Crime Intelligence within the South African Police Service (SAPS). In 2026, Khan became a central figure in a high-profile national security and corruption investigation overseen by the Madlanga Commission of Inquiry.

== Career ==
Khan joined South African Police Services in September 1991 as a constable and rose through the crime intelligence structures, skipping the rank of brigadier to that of major general in 2017. Khan has over three decades in intelligence and has managed sensitive portfolios, including the Undercover Agent Program; Protection and Security Services; Gauteng Crime Intelligence; the Undercover Agent Program (2010-17); head of Operational Intelligence Support; and eventually head of Counter and Security Intelligence from 2019 onward.

== Institutional rivalries ==
In July 2025, KwaZulu-Natal commissioner general Nhlanhla Mkhwanazi made allegations against high-ranking police officials and politicians, including police minister Senzu Mchunu, accusing them of aiding criminal syndicates, involving themselves in investigations, and obstructing justice. This led to Cyril Ramaphosa establishing a parliamentary ad hoc team to probe the allegations, and that's where Khan's name was first mentioned. Mkhwanazi was heading the specialized Political Killings Task Team (PKTT) that has been instrumental in exposing internal SAPS corruption and seizing highly sensitive electronics from compromised senior officials, and this task team was about to be disbanded with 121 case dockets being taken from them. PKTT's rival was the Independent Directorate Against Corruption (IDAC), a permanent investigative arm of the National Prosecuting Authority (NPA) who seemed to be in cahoots with criminal syndicates.

Parliamentary ad hoc hearings have highlighted how these structures have repeatedly clashed over turfs, mandate overlaps, accusations of information leaks to politicians, and reciprocal arrests of rival intelligence heads over control of the multi-million rand crime intelligence secret service slush fund.

== Corruption allegations and arrest ==
Khan was suspended from SAPS following serious criminal allegations detailing complicity in transnational smuggling rings and the manipulation of police operations. He was dismissed from his position on 06 September 2026 after failing to appear at an internal disciplinary hearing. Evidence presented to the Madlanga Commission alleged that Khan maintained a corrupt relationship with prominent tobacco syndicates. Further Whatsapp messages read out in the commission revealed Khan assisted businessman Mohamed "Mo" Sayed to pursue SAPS Covid-19 supply contracts. Other messages between Khan and Sayed mentioned and threatened amongst others, eNCA Crime Watch presenter, anti-crime activist and Tax Justice South Africa founder Yusuf Abramjee. The insulting texts directed to him follow his long criticism of the illicit cigarette trade.

Witness I, a Hawks officer, testified at the Madlanga Commission, implicating Khan over his presence at a July 2021 drug bust in Aeroton, Johannesburg, where a shipping container from Brazil was busted with 715 kg of cocaine worth R286-million. Forensic investigator Paul O’Sullivan also alleged illegal activities by Khan at the commission. Daily Maverick journalist Marianne Thamm, also wrote of police corruption, was one of the people whose name came up between the chats; her home was broken into two months later after Khan's colleague sent the message that read “Counter needs to be activated on this journo.” No one was arrested, and the case was closed. Another WhatsApp message between Khan and Ismail Vally mentions President Cyril Ramaphosa in a vulgar way.

On 10 May 2026, Khan was arrested by a counterintelligence operational unit. He was charged with corruption, defeating the ends of justice, and violating the Precious Metals Act for allegedly running an illicit gold syndicate and falsifying undercover credentials to protect a smuggling suspect. He was released on R20,000 bail.

== Madlanga Commission and 2026 attempted assassination ==
Following his arrest, the PKTT seized Khan's personal electronic devices. Khan launched an urgent High Court application to block investigators from accessing the electronics, claiming they contained sensitive state secrets that could jeopardize national security if leaked. The application was struck from the roll after the devices were legally handed over to the Madlanga Commission of Inquiry. Khan subsequently withdrew all legal challenges and agreed to testify openly.

On Sunday night, 28 June 2026, three days before he was scheduled to give his testimony regarding cartel infiltration and political protection within SAPS at the Madlanga Commission, Khan was ambushed and his vehicle shot at. Assailants in a white Mercedes-Benz pulled alongside his vehicle on Third Avenue in Houghton, Johannesburg, firing multiple rounds into his lower body and abdomen. A handwritten note was recovered at the accident scene and called for criminal cases to be opened against Colonel Khoromi and General Khumalo. Khan survived the attack and was rushed to Netcare Milpark Hospital in critical condition, where he underwent emergency surgery and remained under police guard.

Khan was mentioned during the testimony of the former IDAC boss, Andrea Johnson, where WhatsApp messages suggested that they had a very close relationship. In one of the messages, Khan calls Johnson "Hi, gorgeous." Johnson acknowledged before the Commission that she and Khan had maintained a personal relationship over several years, but this didn't interfere with their duties. Johnson has since asked President Ramaphosa to accept her resignation with immediate effect, which was granted. Khan was expected to make an appearance before the Madlanga Commission on 1 September 2026 and he didn't. On 30 October 2026, Khan and Johnson appeared in the Pretoria Magistrate Court charged with defeating the ends of justice.

== See also ==
- South African Police Service
- Madlanga Commission
- Nhlanhla Mkhwanazi
- Corruption in South Africa
- Andrea Johnson
