= Firoza Zaman =

Bangladeshi politician

Member of Bangladesh Parliament
- In office 1986–1988

Personal details
- Died: 16 January 2016
- Party: Jatiya Party (Ershad)

Firoza Zaman (Bengali: ফিরোজা জামান) was a Jatiya Party (Ershad) politician and member of the Bangladesh Parliament from a reserved women's seat.

== Career ==
Zaman was elected to parliament from a reserved women's seat as a Jatiya Party candidate in 1986. She died on 16 January 2016.
