= Firuz, Kerman =

Firuz فيروز
- Village
- Location within Iran
- Coordinates: 29°04′00″N 57°01′00″E
- Country: Iran
- Province: Kerman
- County: Rabor
- Bakhsh: Hanza
- Rural District: Javaran

Population (2006)
  - Total: 87
- Time zone: UTC+3:30 (IRST)
  - Summer (DST): UTC+4:30 (IRDT)

Firuz (Persian: فيروز, also Romanized as Fīrūz; also known as Pādah Buland, Padeh Boland, and Pādeh Buland) is a village in Javaran Rural District, Hanza District, Rabor County, Kerman Province, Iran. At the 2006 census, its population was 87, in 17 families.
