= Parviz Piran =

Parviz Piran, a sociologist and community development specialist presently is a faculty member of Social Research Department, Allameh Tabatabai University Tehran, Iran. He is also an official scientific board member of the Swiss Academy for Development & a member of Global Network of Government Innovations Network, John F. Kennedy School of Government, Harvard University.

== Publications ==
He has published seven books in English including; Poverty Alleviation in Sistan and Baluchestan: the Case of Shirabad, UNDP, 2002 and Socio-cultural Factors, the Reproductive Health: the Case of Rural Communities, UNFPA& CWP, 2005, Vulnerable Children in Tehran: Status, Problems, Needs and Services Offered CPI, 2007 .

== Activities and Honors ==
He has received a number of awards including UNDP Award for his contributions to community development and poverty alleviation. Dr. Piran has designed and executed a number of participatory projects such as School Mayors of Iran and the Neighborhood Councils now in operation in Tehran and eight other cities. He has published extensively in areas such as Informal settlements, Local Development and Social Participation among Youth. Recently he has introduced his Geo-strategic and Geopolitical Theory of Iranian Society.
