= Firoz Merchant =

Indian businessman and philanthropist

- Born: 1958 (age 67–68); India
- Occupations: Founder and Chairman of Pure Gold Jewellers
- Known for: Pure Gold Jewellers

Firoz Merchant (born 1958) is an Indian businessman, and philanthropist based in the United Arab Emirates. He is the Founder and Chairman of Pure Gold Group, which consists of FGM Holding, Pure Gold Jewellers, Pure Gold Real Estate Development, La Moda, and Pure Gold Manufacturing.

== Early life ==
After he left India, he expressed his desire to his father to move to Dubai and try his hand at the gold business, and in 1989, he moved to Dubai to set up his own gold and diamonds trading business, Pure Gold Jewellers.

== Philanthropy ==
Merchant has been involved in a number of philanthropic activities that have provided help and support for various communities. Merchant has contributed towards correctional institutions in order to release prisoners belonging to various nationalities jailed in the UAE. Merchant announced he will spend 1 million US dollars (3.8 million dirhams) to help free prisoners who are behind bars in UAE due to non-payment of debts. He has already paid 150,000 dirhams for the release of 132 prisoners from Ajman Central jail.

== Awards ==
- 2017, Community Service Medal/ Award by Sheikh Saif Bin Zayed Al Nahyan; Deputy Prime Minister and Ministry of Interior
- 2017, Business Excellence Award by the Indian Business and Professional Council (IBPC)
- 2017, Philanthropic Icon Award by the Indian Business and Professional Council (IBPC)
- 2016, Philanthropic of the year by Indian CEO Awards by ITP

== Personal life ==
As of 2021, Merchant resides in Dubai with his family and spends his leisure time in horse riding.
