= Parviz Karami =

Academic (b. 1964)

secretary of the knowledge-based economy and culture-building technologies

Personal details
- Born: June 3, 1964 (age 62) Hamadan, Imperial State of Iran

Military service
- Allegiance: Iran

Parviz Karami (Persian: پرویز کرمی; born May 31, 1964) is an Iranian journalist and social scientist. He is a University of Tehran faculty member.

He is the chairman of the board of the public relations association (AFRA), a member of the board of directors of the Association of Public Relations Specialists, and advisor to Sorena Sattari, the vice president for science and technology affairs, during the presidency of Hasan Rouhani. Karami is the secretary of the knowledge-based economy and culture-building technologies development headquarters.

Karami is the head of the information and communications center of the Vice-President for Science and Technology Affairs.

== Early life ==
He graduated from the University of Tehran in the field of Social Sciences. His brother Saeed became his knowledge-based executive director.

== Career ==
During 2002–2005, Karami was the managing director of Javan Newspaper, deputy of Alireza Sheikh Attar, and editor-in-chief of Hamshahri Newspaper and founder of Honor Press, the first art news agency of Iran.

He served as deputy of Mohammad Hossein Safar Harandi, the minister of culture and Islamic guidance, in the ninth government and Seyed Mohammad Hosseini, the ministry of culture of the 10th Government of the Islamic Republic of Iran.

During the work of Mehrdad Bazrpash, Karami became the deputy of the national youth organization..

In 2010, Karami became CEO and head of Borna News Agency, affiliated with the ministry of sports and youth. Karami was the director general of general relations and international affairs and advisor to Mohammad Ali Zam in Tehran Municipality's culture and art organization during his presidency. Karami was director general of relations of the Vice-Presidency for science and technology affairs and advisor to Nasrin Soltankhah, the vice president for science and technology affairs in the second term of Iranian President Mahmoud Ahmadinejad.

He was also the plenipotentiary of the Vice-Presidency for science and technology affairs in the Islamic Republic of Iran Broadcasting (IRIB).

In an interview with Shargh Newspaper, Karami described the disturbing statistics regarding the emigration of many elites from the country as false, presenting valid statistics and numbers presented by international institutions.

The national, cultural, and art festival of Made in Iran is held by the knowledge-based economy and culture-building technologies development center with the support of the government of Iran to develop the support of Iranian products. Parviz Karami is the secretary of this event.
