= Parviz Ansari =

Iranian-American physicist and academic administrator

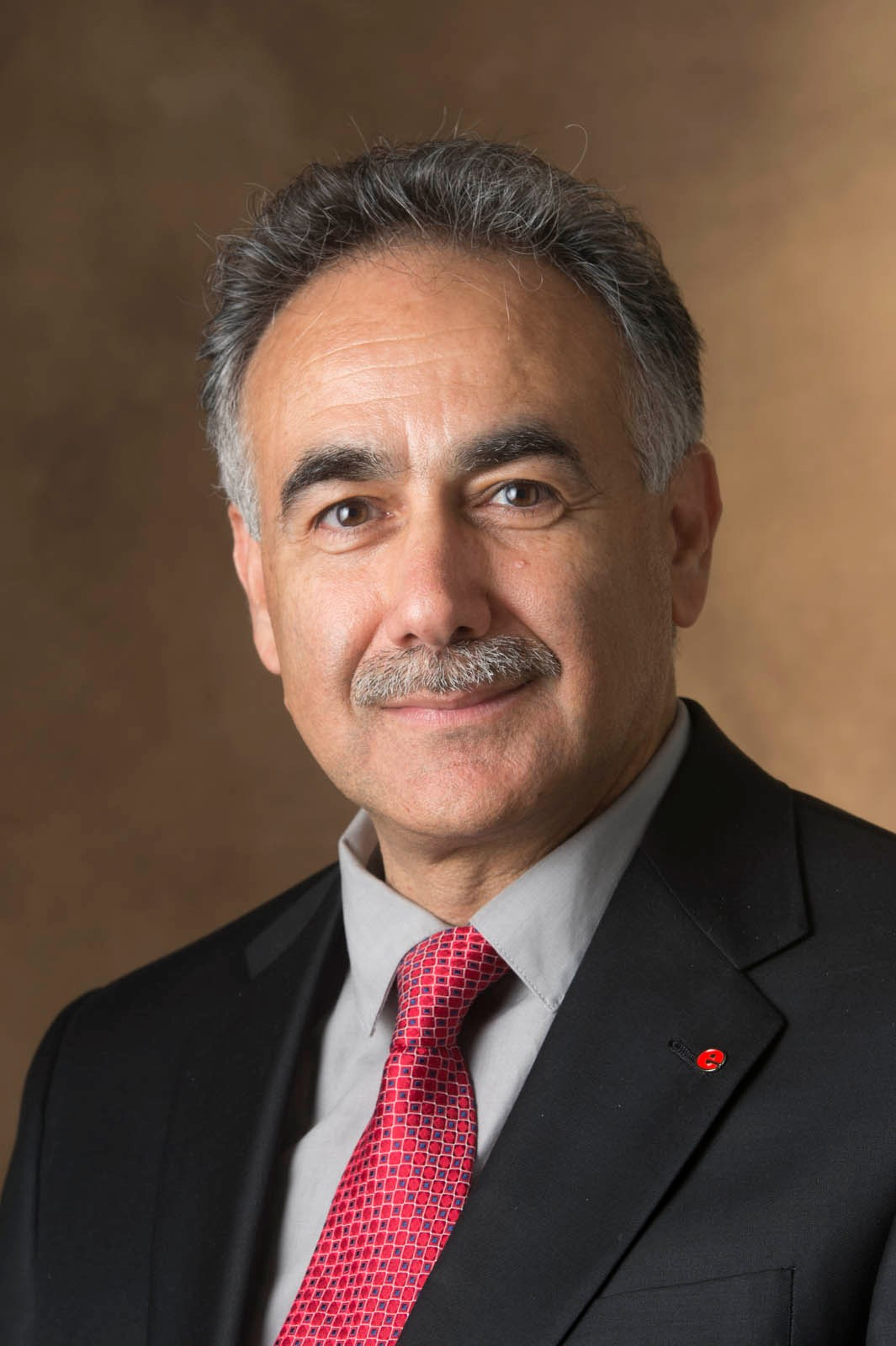
- Born: July 25, 1954; Shiraz, Iran
- Died: July 27, 2025 (aged 71); Boston, Massachusetts, U.S.
- Education: Pahlavi University (B.S.), Tufts University (M.S., Ph.D.)
- Children: 2
- Scientific career
- Fields: Physics, academic administration
- Workplaces: Westfield State University, Southern Illinois University Edwardsville, Rowan University, Seton Hall University

Parviz Ansari (July 25, 1954 – July 27, 2025) was an Iranian-American physicist and academic administrator. He held several senior positions in higher education, including Provost and Vice President for Academic Affairs at Westfield State University, Provost and Vice Chancellor for academic affairs at Southern Illinois University Edwardsville, and Dean of the College of Liberal Arts and Sciences at Rowan University.

== Early life and education ==
Parviz Ansari was born in Shiraz, Iran, on July 25, 1954. He earned a B.S. in Physics from Pahlavi University (now Shiraz University) in 1976. He later moved to the United States with a full scholarship for graduate studies at Tufts University, where he completed his M.S. (1978) and Ph.D. (1983) in Physics and Astronomy.

== Career ==
Ansari was a professor at Seton Hall University from 1983 to 2009. He chaired the Physics Department (1994–2005) and later became Associate Dean of the College of Arts and Sciences.

In 2009, he was appointed Dean of the College of Liberal Arts and Sciences at Rowan University and later became the Founding Dean of the School of Biomedical Sciences. Ansari launched new doctoral and graduate programs including:

- Ph.D. in Clinical Psychology
- M.S. in Bioinformatics
- M.S. in Health Data Analytics

Ansari served as Provost and Vice Chancellor for Academic Affairs at Southern Illinois University Edwardsville (SIUE). During his tenure, new degree programs were introduced in Mechatronics, Pharmaceutical Sciences, and Business Analytics.

He also created the Division of International Affairs and improved faculty diversity through strategic hiring.

At Westfield State University, Ansari served as Provost and Vice President for Academic Affairs.

== Personal life ==
He married in 1979 and is survived by his wife, a son and daughter. His interests included astronomy, physics, and Persian poetry.

In February 2019, Ansari was diagnosed with glioblastoma multiforme (GBM), an aggressive form of brain cancer. Following intensive treatment and a period of remission, in October 2024 he was then diagnosed with small cell neuroendocrine carcinoma (SCNC), a rare and fast-progressing malignancy. He died on July 27, 2025 in Boston, Massachusetts.

== Honors and affiliations ==
His honors and affiliations include:

- American Council on Education (ACE) Fellow, 2005–2006
- Leadership New Jersey Fellow, 2008
- Phi Kappa Phi and Sigma Pi Sigma Honor Societies
- Service awards from Seton Hall and Rowan Universities
- Founding member of the New Jersey Big Data Alliance
- Board member, St. Louis Academy of Science, Council of Colleges of Arts and Sciences (CCAS)

== Research and publications ==
Ansari’s scientific research was in condensed matter physics and x-ray absorption spectroscopy. He conducted research at Cornell University's CHESS Lab and Brookhaven National Laboratory. He published various peer-reviewed articles on topics such as superconductivity in rare-earth materials, thin film ferroelectrics, and multilayer magnetic structures in journals such as:

- Physical Review B
- Journal of Applied Physics
- Materials Research Society Proceedings

Some of his articles include:

- Ansari, P.H. et al. (1994). “Effect of Pressure on the Reentrant Superconducting Phase Boundaries...” Physical Review B, 49(6), 3894.
- Ansari, P.H. et al. (1997). “Fe-fcc Layer Stabilization in [111]-Textured Fe/Pt Multilayers.” Nanostructured Materials, 9(1–8), 413.
- Ansari, P.H. et al. (2005). “Clustering Analysis in Boron and Phosphorus Implanted Germanium.” MRS Proceedings, 864.
