= Firuz Mustafa =

- Born: February 18, 1952 (age 74); Isali, Gadabay District, Azerbaijan Soviet Socialist Republic, Soviet Union
- Education: Azerbaijan State Pedagogical University
- Writing career
- Language: Azerbaijani

Firuz Mustafa (Azerbaijani: Firuz Qədimalı oğlu Mustafayev; February 18, 1952, Isali, Gadabay District) is an Azerbaijani writer, playwright, philosopher, Honored Artist of the Republic of Azerbaijan (2019).

== Biography ==
Born on February 18, 1952 in the village of Isali, Gadabay region of the Republic of Azerbaijan, in the family of a teacher. (But some documents indicate that he was born in June or July).

In 1975 he graduated from the Faculty of Philology of the Azerbaijan State Pedagogical University. He taught in schools in the Saatli district for two years.

Served in the army.

Firuz Mustafa graduated from graduate school and defended his candidate and doctoral dissertations in philosophy.

For many years he taught philosophy, world literature, and cultural studies to undergraduate, graduate, and doctoral students. He worked as editor-in-chief of the newspapers “Medeniyet” (“Culture”), “Maarifchi” (“Enlightener”), the magazine “Theater” and hosted popular TV shows such as “Ilgym”. (“Mirage”), “Idrak” (“Cognition”).

Head of the drama sector of the Azerbaijan Writers Union.

== Creation ==
Firuz Mustafa is the author of more than a hundred fiction and scientific books. His scientific work is related to the study of globalization and cultural issues.

Firuz Mustafa's first book (“The Grove of Thorns. Stories”) was published in 1985.

His works have been translated into many languages. Dozens of his plays have been staged in many theaters around the world.

The novels “The Door”, “Flower of Paradise”, “Sea Caravan” have been translated into many languages.

== Awards ==
Firuza Mustafa is a laureate of the Jabbarli and Humay awards.

== Family ==
Wife - Hadzhar Huseynova (1960) teacher, daughter - Guntekin Mustafaeva (1987) psychologist, son - Agshin Mustafa (1990) programmer.
