= Phiroz Mehta =

- Phiroz Mehta outside his London home, Dilkusha
- Born: Phirozshah Dorabji Mehta; 1 October 1902; Cambay, Gujarat, India
- Died: 2 May 1994 (aged 91); London, England
- Occupations: Pianist, Author, Lecturer
- Writing career
- Notable works: Early Indian Religious Thought, Zarathushtra: The Transcendental Vision, The Heart of Religion, Buddhahood
- Website: beingtrulyhuman.org

Phirozshah Dorabji Mehta (2 October 1902 – 2 May 1994) was an Indian writer, lecturer (primarily on religious topics), and pianist. His other academic interests included subjects such as astronomy, poetry, and philosophy.

== Early life ==
Mehta was born to Parsi Zoroastrian parents in Cambay, Gujarat, India.

== Education ==
After his schooling at Royal College, Colombo, he won a scholarship to Trinity College, Cambridge where he studied Natural Sciences and History. Due to the lack of a birth certificate in his home state of Gujarat, he was not allowed to apply for the scholarship. Although the matter was brought before the House of Lords, no grant was ultimately provided. However, through private sponsorship, he eventually obtained the necessary funding and was able to begin his studies. Unfortunately, during his last year at Cambridge, he fell ill and was unable to finish his academic pursuits. Twenty-six years later, after studying intensively for only ten weeks, he took the final exam in history and was awarded his master's degree.

== Pianist ==
From 1924 until 1932 he studied the piano with the world-renowned pianist Solomon, giving recitals in India and Britain. Due to illness, he was unable to follow his chosen career as a concert pianist and piano teacher. The conductor Zubin Mehta was one of his early piano pupils.

== Philosophy ==
He devised his own system of physical education to promote health and self-expression through rhythmic movement and breathing and taught this method for fifteen years. People as diverse as C.B. Fry, the England cricket captain, and Douglas Kennedy, president of the English Folk Dance and Song Society, came to him for lessons.

From early childhood, Phiroz Mehta had a burning interest in religion and philosophy and he was closely involved with the Theosophical Society for many years. At the age of 16, he was running the Colombo branch.

In 1956 his first major book, Early Indian Religious Thought, was published. It was not however until 1976, after extensive study, research, and travel in India that he completed The Heart of Religion, a profound study of the essence which is common to all religious experience. During these years a frequent visitor to his south London home, Dilkusha, for advice on Eastern religions was Fritjof Capra, author of The Tao of Physics et alia. Mehta subsequently published three more books, Zarathushtra (1985), Buddhahood (1988), and Holistic Consciousness (1989).

During his lifetime he gave over three thousand lectures on religion and Indian culture to learned societies, university students, schools, and conference centres in England, the Netherlands, Germany, India and at his London home, Dilkusha.

Phiroz Mehta always insisted that he was not to be regarded as a guru or as a leader of any movement but essentially as a fellow student. He regarded every person as being unique, discovering truth through his or her own way of life.

He died on May 2, 1994, and his funeral, held at Gloucester Crematorium, was conducted in the traditional manner by Zoroastrian priests.

== Bibliography ==
- Early Indian Religious Thought (1956)
- The Heart of Religion (1976)
- Zarathushtra: The Transcendental Vision (1985)
- Buddhahood (1988)
- Holistic Consciousness (1989)

=== Posthumous publications ===
- Insight into Individual Living (1995)
- The Oakroom Talks on Buddhism (1998)
