= Firuz Kanatlı =

Turkish businessman (1932–2017)

- Born: 1932; Eskişehir, Turkey
- Died: 18 October 2017 (aged 84–85); Eskişehir, Turkey
- Education: Galatasaray High School
- Alma mater: University of Geneva
- Occupation: Businessman
- Organization: Eti
- Known for: Eti
- Spouse: Gülay Kanatlı (1958–2015)

Firuz Kanatlı (1932 – 18 October 2017) was a Turkish businessman and founder and honorary president of the food company Eti.

He was born in Eskişehir, Turkey, in 1932. He attended primary school until the third school year, after which he went to Galatasaray High School in Istanbul and graduated from there. He studied business administration at the University of Geneva in Switzerland. When he returned home, he started to work in his father's flour mill, the "Gümülcineli Flour Mill". The factory would later be renamed to "Kanatlı Flour Mill".

The dream of establishing his own business lead Kanatlı to search for a work branch. His grandparents' first millstone-flour mill "Gümülcine" (Turkish for Komotini, a city in East Macedonia and Thrace of Greece) led him to reconnect with his family history, and led him to the idea to produce pasta. As sugar was easy to find in the sugar refinery nearby, he decided to branch out into the biscuit business.

The only biscuit brands in Turkey at the time were "Arı", "Ülker", "Besler", "Haylayf" and "İdeal", whose factories were all in Istanbul. His business brought biscuit production to Central Anatolia. He wanted to bring his business onto the market under the name Bal (Honey), which had its trademark rights claimed by another business. He opted to create the brand under "Eti" (Turkish for Hittites) instead, and began production under the name in 1962.

== Personal life ==
Firuz Kanatlı's wife, Gülay Kanatlı, died on 4 August 2015 at the age of 73.

== Sources ==
- "Firuz Kanatlı kimdir?". Yeni Şafak. 18 October 2017.
- "Firuz Kanatlı anlatıyor: Sabri Ülker'le ilk görüşmemizde tartıştık". Sözcü. 19 October 2017.
- "ETİ'nin kurucusu Firuz Kanatlı hayatını kaybetti (Firuz Kanatlı kimdir?)". NTV. 18 October 2017.
