= Firouz Bagherzadeh =

Iranian archaeologist, Islamic art scholar (1930–2021)

- Born: 31 May 1930; Tabriz, Iran
- Died: 4 February 2021 (aged 90); Paris, France
- Awards: Fulbright Scholarship for postgraduate studies

Academic background
- Education: Sorbonne
- Doctoral advisor: Gaston Wiet

Academic work
- Discipline: Islamic archaeology and art
- Notable works: Establishment of the Archaeological Center of Iran; Abolishment of the law on the division of archaeological finds resulting from the surveys and excavations of joint Iranian and foreign delegations; establishment of a laboratory for the restoration of archaeological finds; the inscription of the three Iranian monuments in the World Heritage List

Firouz Bagherzadeh (31 May 1930 – 4 February 2021) was an Iranian archaeologist, Islamic art scholar, and expert on ceramics and Islamic inscriptions. Farr- e Firouz is a collection of essays in honor of Firouz Bagherzadeh. This book was edited by Shahin Aryamanesh.

Bagherzadeh was born on 31 May 1930, in Tabriz, Iran. He received his B.A. degree from Tehran University in 1954. In 1956 he joined the Department of Fine Arts where he founded the periodical Honar va Mardom (Art and Ethnography), of which he was the editor until he obtained a Fulbright Scholarship for postgraduate studies in the U.S., where he read art history at the University of Southern Illinois (1959–60) and received his master's degree in art history. He started his specialization in Islamic art and archaeology at the School of Oriental and African Studies of the University of London (1960–62) under Storm Rice. He went to Paris, where he worked at the Sorbonne (1962–67) under the tutorship of Gaston Wiet, at the same time reading Islamic art and archaeology at the Ecole du Louvre under the late Jean David Weil.

In 1967 he was admitted to the CNRS as a researcher in Oriental cultures, and he worked there until he was commissioned by the Iranian Ministry of Culture and Arts in 1971 to return home and prepare the project for the Iranian Centre for Archaeological Research (ICAR). He founded the ICAR in 1972 and was its director-general until 1978. He initiated the Annual Symposium on Archaeological Research in Iran and is the editor of the proceedings thereof. In June 1977 he was elected the first president of the World Committee of Cultural and Natural Heritage (UNESCO).

== Influence and legacy ==
Abolishment of the law on the division of archaeological finds resulting from the surveys and excavations of joint Iranian and foreign delegations, the establishment of a laboratory for the restoration of archaeological finds, the inscription of the three Iranian monuments in the World Heritage List (Chogha Zanbil, Persepolis, and Naqsh-e Jahan Square) in collaboration with Shahriyar Adl are among his most important works.

== Festschrift ==
Farr- e Firouz, Distinguished Scholars of cultural heritage of iran (Vol. 5) Special edition in honor of Dr. Firouz Bagherzadeh is a collection of essays in honor of Firouz Bagherzadeh. This book was edited by Shahin Aryamanesh.

== Published works ==
- Bagherzadeh, F.(ed.), 1972. Proceedings of the 1st Annual Symposium of Archaeological Research in Iran, Tehran, 1972.
- Bagherzadeh, F.(ed.), 1973. Proceedings of the IInd annual symposium on archaeological research in Iran: 29 October – 1 November 1973, Tehran, 1973
- Bagherzadeh, F.(ed.), 1974. Proceedings of the IIIrd Annual Symposium on Archaeological Research in Iran, 2–7 November 1974, Tehran, 1974.
- Bagherzadeh, F.(ed.), 1975. Proceedings of the IVth annual symposium on archaeological research in Iran: 3–8 November 1975, Tehran, 1975.
- Bagherzadeh, F.(ed.), 1979. The World’s Great Collections. Oriental Ceramics IV: Iran Bastan Museum, Tehran, Tokyo.

== See also ==
- Medieval Persia
- National Museum of Iran
