= Elappully =

Gram Panchayat in Palakkad district of Kerala, India

Elappully is a village panchayat in the Palakkad district, state of Kerala, India. It is a local government organisation that serves the villages of Elappully-I and Elappully-II.

== Demographics ==
As of 2011 India census, Elappully-I had a population of 18,175 with 8,905 males and 9,270 females.

As of 2011 India census, Elappully-II had a population of 20,857 with 10,286 males and 10,571 females.
