= Piruz Dilanchi =

Iranian-Azerbaijani separatist leader

Piruz Dilanchi پيروز ديلنچی
- Dilanchi (right) and Heydar Aliyev in Baku

Personal details
- Born: Ali Ismayilfiruz, علی اسماعيل فيروز; 16 May 1965 (age 61) Tehran, Iran
- Citizenship: Iran; Azerbaijan; Canada
- Party: South Azerbaijan National Liberation Movement (SANLM) or (CAMAH)
- Spouse: Aynura Karimova
- Children: 2
- Website: www.piruzdilanchi.com

Pirouz Dilanchi (Azerbaijani: Piruz Dilənçi, پیروز دیلنچی, Iranian Azeri pronunciation [piˈruːz diːlænˈt͡ʃi], Soviet Azeri pronunciation [piˈrus dilænˈt͡ʃi]; born Ali (Baratali oglu) Ismayilfiruz, (Azerbaijani: Əli (Baratəli oğlu) İsmayılfiruz, علی اسماعیل فیروز, Soviet Azeri pronunciation [æˈli bɑrɑtæˈli ɔˈɣlu iˌsmɑj(ə)lfiˈrus]; May 1965 in Tehran, Iran) is an Iranian-Azerbaijani separatist leader.

He has also written multiple poems and is the author of eight books in Azerbaijani and Persian.

== Biography ==
Dilanchi's scientific, literary, social, and political articles have been published in publications such as Yeni Musavat, Keyhan, Azadliq, 525-ci qezet, Edebiyyat ve Incesenet, Ettelaat in Iran and Azerbaijan.

He was purportedly arrested and tortured for his views and for participating in left-wing organizations by the Iranian government after the revolution. He then fled to the Azerbaijani SSR in 1990 to escape persecution.

He is currently a Canadian citizen and lives in Toronto, Canada.

== Writing ==
In 1991, he created a section in the newspaper "Literature and Art" named "Literary Tabriz", which was included in every issue for a year. Later, at the initiative of Pirouz Dilanchi, a number of programs with names such as "Araz-South literature" and "Shahriyar-South literature" were shown on Azerbaijan State Television.

Pirouz Dilanchi is a member of the Union of Azerbaijani Writers. He also claims to have written nearly 100 songs. One of his most famous is "Yada sal məni" (Don't Forget About Me), a song about the First Karabakh War, which was adapted to music by Eldar Mansurov and sung by Mubariz Tagiyev.

== Politics ==
He is one of the founders of the South Azerbaijan National Liberation Movement and its leader.

He brought the idea of separation of "South Azerbaijan" from Iran to the attention of government officials in Azerbaijan. Because of this, Pirouz Dilanchi became the most dangerous political figure for the Iranian Government between the years 1994-2001. He has been a victim of different attacks by the Iranian government since he became very popular and important political figure acting against Iran. Once, a special terrorist group from Iran attacked him midnight in his apartment in Baku trying to kill him. After the attack terrorist group were able to escape before Azerbaijan Intelligence Officers came to the place of incident along with Azerbaijan Police.

Dilanchi collected about 3000 signatures in 2000 and suggested his candidacy to the Azerbaijan Republic Parliament in order to participate in the next election. His candidacy was officially registered but was denied before the elections by pressure from the mafia responsible for elections. Central Elections Committee ignored the registered candidacy of Dilanchi, citing unfair and contradicting pretexts.

== Kidnapping ==
Dilanchi was kidnapped by an unknown group in front of his house on 5 December 2002. As a result of pressure, the media kept his location secret for 21 days, however, the Press Secretary of the Internal Affairs Ministry declared that he was in jail. After being kept for some weeks in the cold underground in inhumane conditions, Dilanchi was sent to Shuvalan prison. After 38 days in prison, having been arrested without reason, he was allowed to be transferred to house arrest. After three months, he was freed.
