= Firouz Gahvari =

American economist

Firouz Gahvari is an American economist, focusing in public economics and optimal taxation, currently the Leiby Hall Distinguished Professor of Economics at University of Illinois Urbana-Champaign.

== Bibliography ==
- Janet M. Currie; Firouz Gahvari (2007). Transfers in Cash and in Kind: Theory Meets the Data. National Bureau of Economic Research.
- Helmuth Cremer; Firouz Gahvari; Pierre Pestieau (2010). Accidental Bequests: A Curse for the Rich and a Boon for the Poor. Univ., Center for Economic Studies.
- "Firouz Gahvari". EconPapers.
