= Paul O'Sullivan (forensic investigator) =

South African private investigator and anti-corruption activist

- Born: Paul Robert O'Sullivan; 26 August 1955 (age 71); Dublin, Ireland
- Citizenship: Ireland; South Africa
- Occupations: Forensic investigator, security consultant
- Years active: 1980s–present
- Website: O’Sullivan Brosnan and Associates

Paul Robert O’Sullivan (born 26 August 1955) is an Ireland and South African forensic investigator, security consultant, and prominent anti-corruption activist. He is widely known for conducting investigations into alleged misconduct by senior officials in the South African Police Service (SAPS) and for his outspoken public stance on corruption.

== Early years ==
Paul O'Sullivan was born on February 17, 1953, in Dublin, Ireland. Paul moved to South Africa in the late 1980s.

== Career ==
O’Sullivan has led several high-profile investigations into corruption within the criminal justice system. He has frequently made public submissions, media statements, and legal complaints relating to alleged wrongdoing by senior police officials.

In July 2025, O’Sullivan publicly called for the suspension of KwaZulu-Natal Police Commissioner, Lieutenant General Nhlanhla Mkhwanazi, accusing him of unlawful conduct relating to public disclosures about ongoing investigations.

O’Sullivan has participated in numerous public hearings, inquiries, and investigations, claiming to expose systemic corruption within the SAPS and related institutions. He was also arrested at some point.

In January 2003, O’Sullivan, then a board member at Airports Company South Africa, opened a criminal docket against Jackie Selebi, South Africa's chief of police and global head of Interpol, after discovering that Selebi was on the payroll of notorious drug trafficker Glenn Agliotti. Selebi was convicted of corruption and sentenced to fifteen years in prison in 2010.

In October 2012, O’Sullivan opened a criminal docket against Crime Intelligence boss Richard Mdluli and National Prosecuting Authority (NPA) bosses Lawrence Mrwebi and Nomgcobo Jiba. Jiba was later fired from the NPA, and both Mrwebi and Mdluli were suspended from their positions. Mdluli went on to be convicted of unrelated offenses and was sent to prison.

== Legal disputes ==
=== Defamation suit by Lt-Gen Mkhwanazi ===
In September 2025, KwaZulu-Natal Police Commissioner Lt-Gen Mkhwanazi filed a R5 million defamation lawsuit against O’Sullivan, alleging that O’Sullivan made several damaging public claims accusing him of corruption and misuse of public resources.

=== O’Sullivan’s R10 million counterclaim ===
In October 2025, O’Sullivan filed a R10 million counterclaim against Mkhwanazi, accusing him of making defamatory statements during the Madlanga Commission of Inquiry and during parliamentary testimony.

O’Sullivan disputed claims that he had opened a criminal case in KwaZulu-Natal and denied allegations that he “ran IPID operations” from his home.

== Involvement in commissions and inquiries ==
O’Sullivan has indicated willingness to present evidence to the Madlanga Commission of Inquiry, which is investigating corruption and political interference in the criminal justice sector. His earlier complaints and statements also appear in evidence presented to the Zondo Commission related to procurement irregularities in forensic services at SAPS.

== Public profile and advocacy ==
O’Sullivan is often described as an outspoken whistleblower. He has stated that his work aims to expose corruption and is not motivated by personal or political interests.

He has also warned that certain allegations he has uncovered “may shock the nation” if left unaddressed.

O’Sullivan's confrontational style has drawn mixed public reaction. Some commentators regard him as a fearless anti-corruption advocate, while others argue that his public accusations may overstep legal boundaries or risk defamation. He has been involved in multiple legal disputes, and his critics argue that his methods can escalate political tensions within the police and justice system. While giving evidence to the parliament ad hoc task team, Cedrick Nkabinde, suspended Police Minister Senzo Mchunu’s chief of staff, claimed and read a threatening message received from O'Sullivan to which MPs reacted strongly and said they would investigate possible witness intimidation.

== Court cases ==
Between March 2015 and February 2016, O’Sullivan exited and entered South Africa on his Irish passport, allegedly contravening Section 26 (b) of the South African Citizenship Act. He became the first person in the country to ever be charged with the offense. O'Sullivan had also been charged with other cases, such as the Bramley case of fraud and extortion, a Rosebank case of kidnapping, the immigration case, and a Kempton Park case of extortion, fraud, and intimidation.

== Personal life ==
Court documents from 2025 indicate that O’Sullivan owns a substantial property portfolio and has funded parts of his investigative work using personal resources.
