= Politics of Thuringia =

German state government and politics

The politics of Thuringia takes place within a framework of a federal parliamentary representative democratic republic, where the Federal Government of Germany exercises sovereign rights with certain powers reserved to the states of Germany including Thuringia. The four main parties, following the 2024 elections, are the far-right Alternative for Germany (AfD), the centre-right Christian Democratic Union, the populist left Sahra Wagenknecht Alliance (BSW), and the left-wing Left Party.

Every five years, all Germans residing in the State over the age of 18 elect the members of the Landtag of Thuringia. This regional parliament or legislature then elects the Minister-President and confirms the cabinet members.

The Alternative for Germany (AfD) is currently largest party in the Landtag following the 2024 Thuringian state election.

Thuringia is notable for being the first and only state in Germany where The Left (Die Linke) and the Alternative for Germany (AfD) have seen its first-ever first place finish in a state election. Die Linke in 2019 and the AfD in 2024.

Thuringia in 1930 saw the first Nazi to hold a ministerial-level post at any level in Germany, with Wilhelm Frick as state Minister of the Interior.

== List of minister-presidents of Thuringia ==
1. 1990 - 1992: Josef Duchač (CDU)
2. 1992 - 2003: Bernhard Vogel (CDU)
3. 2003 - 2009: Dieter Althaus (CDU)
4. 2009 - 2014: Christine Lieberknecht (CDU)
5. 2014 - 2020: Bodo Ramelow (Left)
6. 2020: Thomas Kemmerich (FDP)
7. 2020 - 2024: Bodo Ramelow (Left)
8. Since 2024: Mario Voigt (CDU)

== Landtag of Thuringia ==
=== Party strength in the Landtag ===
Election year	Total seats	Seats won							
Election year	Total seats	CDU	SPD	PDS	FDP	Grüne	Linke	AfD	BSW
1990	89	44	21	9	9	6			
1994	88	42	29	17					
1999	88	49	18	21					
2004	88	45	15	28					
2009	88	30	18		7	6	27		
2014	91	34	12			6	28	11	
2019	90	21	8		5	5	29	22	
2024	88	23	6				12	32	15

=== Legislative compositions ===
1990 Thuringian state election

1994 Thuringian state election

1999 Thuringian state election

2004 Thuringian state election

2009 Thuringian state election

2014 Thuringian state election

2019 Thuringian state election

2024 Thuringian state election

=== State election result maps ===
1990 Thuringian state election - Black is CDU

1994 Thuringian state election - Black is CDU, Red is SPD

1999 Thuringian state election - Black is CDU

2004 Thuringian state election - Black is CDU, Pink is Left

2009 Thuringian state election - Black is CDU, Pink is Left, Red is SPD

2014 Thuringian state election - Black is CDU, Pink is Left, Red is SPD

2019 Thuringian state election - Black is CDU, Blue is AfD, Pink is Left, Red is SPD

2024 Thuringian state election - Blue is AfD, Black is CDU, Pink is Left

=== Constituencies in the Landtag ===
No	Constituency	Member	2024	2019	2014	2009	2004	1999	1994
1	Eichsfeld I	Thadäus König	CDU	CDU	CDU	CDU	CDU	CDU	CDU
2	Eichsfeld II	Christina Tasch	CDU	CDU	CDU	CDU	CDU	CDU	CDU
3	Nordhausen I	Joerg Prophet	AfD	Left	CDU	CDU	CDU	CDU	CDU
4	Nordhausen II	Kerstin Düben-Schaumann	AfD	Left	Left	CDU	CDU	CDU	CDU
5	Wartburgkreis I	Uwe Krell	AfD	CDU	CDU	CDU	CDU	CDU	CDU
6	Wartburgkreis II – Eisenach	Ulrike Jary	CDU	CDU	CDU	Left	CDU	CDU	CDU
7	Wartburgkreis III	Marcus Malsch	CDU	CDU	CDU	CDU	CDU	CDU	CDU
8	Unstrut-Hainich-Kreis I	Jonas Urbach	CDU	CDU	CDU	CDU	CDU	CDU	CDU
9	Unstrut-Hainich-Kreis II	Stefan Möller	AfD	AfD	CDU	CDU	CDU	CDU	CDU
10	Kyffhäuserkreis I – Eichsfeld III	Stefan Schard	CDU	CDU	CDU	CDU	CDU	CDU	CDU
11	Kyffhäuserkreis II	Jens Cotta	AfD	AfD	CDU	CDU	CDU	CDU	CDU
12	Schmalkalden-Meiningen I	Vivien Rottstedt	AfD	CDU	CDU	CDU	CDU	CDU	CDU
13	Schmalkalden-Meiningen II	Jan Abicht	AfD	AfD	CDU	Left	CDU	CDU	CDU
14	Gotha I	Marcel Kramer	AfD	AfD	CDU	CDU	CDU	CDU	CDU
15	Gotha II	Stephan Steinbrück	AfD	SPD	SPD	SPD	CDU	CDU	CDU
16	Sömmerda I – Gotha III	Daniel Haseloff	AfD	CDU	CDU	CDU	CDU	CDU	CDU
17	Sömmerda II	Torsten Czuppon	AfD	AfD	CDU	CDU	CDU	CDU	CDU
18	Hildburghausen I – Schmalkalden-Meiningen III	Nadine Hoffmann	AfD	AfD	CDU	Left	CDU	CDU	CDU
19	Sonneberg I	Jürgen Treutler	AfD	AfD	CDU	CDU	CDU	CDU	CDU
20	Hildburghausen II – Sonneberg II	Melanie Berger	AfD	CDU	CDU	CDU	CDU	CDU	CDU
21	Suhl – Schmalkalden-Meiningen IV	Torsten Czuppon	AfD	Left	Left	Left	PDS	CDU	CDU
22	Ilm-Kreis I	Andreas Bühl	CDU	CDU	CDU	Left	CDU	CDU	CDU
23	Ilm-Kreis II	Olaf Kießling	AfD	AfD	CDU	CDU	CDU	CDU	CDU
24	Erfurt I	Sascha Castles	AfD	Left	Left	Left	PDS	CDU	CDU
25	Erfurt II	Torsten Czuppon	CDU	Left	Left	Left	CDU	CDU	CDU
26	Erfurt III	Bodo Ramelow	Left	Left	CDU	Left	CDU	CDU	CDU
27	Erfurt IV	Torsten Czuppon	AfD	Left	Left	Left	PDS	CDU	CDU
28	Saalfeld-Rudolstadt I	Thomas Benninghaus	AfD	AfD	CDU	CDU	CDU	CDU	CDU
29	Saalfeld-Rudolstadt II	Denis Häußer	AfD	CDU	CDU	CDU	CDU	CDU	CDU
30	Weimarer Land I – Saalfeld-Rudolstadt III	Torsten Czuppon	AfD	CDU	CDU	CDU	CDU	CDU	CDU
31	Weimar I – Weimarer Land II	Peter Gerhardt	AfD	CDU	CDU	CDU	CDU	CDU	CDU
32	Weimar II	Ulrike Grosse-Röthig	Left	Left	CDU	Left	CDU	CDU	CDU
33	Saale-Orla-Kreis I	Uwe Thrum	AfD	AfD	CDU	CDU	CDU	CDU	CDU
34	Saale-Orla-Kreis II	Ringo Mühlmann	AfD	CDU	CDU	Left	CDU	CDU	CDU
35	Saale-Holzland-Kreis I	Stephan Tiesler	CDU	CDU	CDU	CDU	CDU	CDU	CDU
36	Saale-Holzland-Kreis II	Wiebke Muhsal	AfD	CDU	CDU	CDU	CDU	CDU	CDU
37	Jena I	Jens Thomas	Left	Left	Left	SPD	CDU	CDU	SPD
38	Jena II	Lena Saniye Güngör	Left	Left	Left	Left	CDU	CDU	SPD
39	Greiz I	Martina Schweinsburg	CDU	CDU	CDU	CDU	CDU	CDU	CDU
40	Greiz II	Christian Tischner	CDU	CDU	CDU	CDU	CDU	CDU	CDU
41	Gera I	Torsten Czuppon	AfD	Left	Left	Left	PDS	CDU	CDU
42	Gera II	Wolfganf Lauerwald	AfD	AfD	Left	Left	PDS	CDU	CDU
43	Altenburger Land I	Thomas Hoffmann	AfD	AfD	CDU	CDU	CDU	CDU	CDU
44	Altenburger Land II	Torben Braga	AfD	CDU	CDU	CDU	CDU	CDU	CDU

== Constituencies in the Bundestag ==
No	Constituency	Member	2021	Voters	2017	2013	2009	2005	2002	1998	1994	1990
188	Eichsfeld – Nordhausen – Kyffhäuserkreis	Manfred Grund	CDU	209,203	CDU	CDU	CDU	CDU	CDU	CDU	CDU	CDU
189	Eisenach – Wartburgkreis – Unstrut-Hainich-Kreis	Klaus Stöber	AfD	212,267	CDU	CDU	CDU	SPD	SPD	SPD	CDU	CDU
190	Jena – Sömmerda – Weimarer Land I	Holger Becker	SPD	198,697	CDU	CDU	CDU	CDU	SPD	SPD	CDU	CDU
191	Gotha – Ilm-Kreis	Marcus Bühl	AfD	190,519	CDU	CDU	CDU	SPD	SPD	SPD	CDU	CDU
192	Erfurt – Weimar – Weimarer Land II	Carsten Schneider	SPD	217,944	CDU	CDU	CDU	SPD	Created for 2005 election			
193	Gera – Greiz – Altenburger Land	Stephan Brandner	AfD	229,588	CDU	CDU	CDU	CDU	SPD	SPD	CDU	CDU
194	Saalfeld-Rudolstadt – Saale-Holzland-Kreis – Saale-Orla-Kreis	Michael Kaufmann	AfD	219,437	CDU	CDU	CDU	SPD	SPD	Created for 2002 election		
195	Suhl – Schmalkalden-Meiningen – Hildburghausen – Sonneberg	Frank Ullrich	SPD	230,071	CDU	CDU	Left	SPD	SPD	SPD	CDU	CDU

=== Bundestag election results ===
Election year	% won	% won								
Election year	% won	CDU	SPD	PDS	FDP	Grüne	NDP	Linke	AfD	BSW
1990	100	45.2	21.9	8.3	14.6	6.1				
1994	100	41.0	30.2	17.2	4.1	4.9				
1998	100	28.9	34.5	21.2	3.4	3.9				
2002	100	29.4	39.9	17.0	5.9	4.3				
2005	100	25.7	29.8		7.9	4.8	3.7	26.1		
2009	100	31.2	17.6		9.8	6.0		28.8		
2013	100	38.8	16.1		2.6	4.9		23.4	6.2	
2017	100	28.8	13.2		7.8	4.1		16.9	22.7	
2021	100	16.9	23.4		9.0	6.6		11.4	24.0	
2025	100	18.6	8.8		2.8	4.2		15.2	38.6	9.4

== See also ==
- Landtag of Thuringia
- 1990 Thuringian state election
- 1994 Thuringian state election
- 1999 Thuringian state election
- 2004 Thuringia state election
- 2009 Thuringia state election
- 2014 Thuringian state election
- 2019 Thuringian state election
- 2024 Thuringian state election
- New states of Germany
- Politics of East Germany
