= Erfurt III =

Electoral constituency in Thuringia, Germany

Erfurt III is an electoral constituency (German: Wahlkreis) represented in the Landtag of Thuringia. It elects one member via first-past-the-post voting. Under the current constituency numbering system, it is designated as constituency 26. It contains central and southwestern parts of Erfurt, the capital and largest city of Thuringia.

Erfurt III was created in 1990 for the first state election. Since 2019, it has been represented by Bodo Ramelow of The Left.

== Geography ==
As of the 2019 state election, Erfurt III is located entirely within the urban district of Erfurt. It covers the central and southwestern part of the city, specifically the city districts (Stadtteile) of Altstadt, Bischleben-Stedten, Frienstedt, Hochheim, Johannesvorstadt, Krämpfervorstadt, Löbervorstadt, Möbisburg-Rhoda, Molsdorf, and Schmira.

== Members ==
The constituency was held by the Christian Democratic Union (CDU) from its creation in 1990 until 2009, during which time it was represented by Jörg Kallenbach (1990–2004) and Marion Walsmann (2004–2009). Bodo Ramelow of The Left narrowly defeated incumbent Walsmann in 2009; he was in turn defeated by Walsmann in 2014. Walsmann retired from state politics before the 2019 election, and Ramelow won the seat for a second time.

Election	Member	Party	%
1990	Jörg Kallenbach	CDU	39.1
1994	Jörg Kallenbach	CDU	38.4
1999	Jörg Kallenbach	CDU	48.8
2004	Marion Walsmann	CDU	36.0
2009	Bodo Ramelow	LINKE	26.8
2014	Marion Walsmann	CDU	33.8
2019	Bodo Ramelow	LINKE	42.1
2024	Bodo Ramelow	LINKE	42.4

== Election results ==
=== 2024 election ===
State election (2024): Erfurt III
Notes:	Blue background denotes the winner of the electorate vote. Pink background denotes a candidate elected from their party list. Yellow background denotes an electorate win by a list member, or other incumbent. A ✓ or ✗ denotes status of any incumbent, win or lose respectively.						
Party	Candidate	Votes	%	±%	Party votes	%	±%
Left	✓ Bodo Ramelow	15,111	42.4	▲0.3	5,891	16.4	▼13.8
CDU	Wolfgang Weißkopf	8,507	23.9	▲7.6	8,080	22.5	▲5.5
AfD	Alexander Claus	7,142	20.0	▲6.0	6,440	17.9	▲3.6
BSW					4,909	13.7	
SPD	Denny Möller	2,633	7.4	Steady	4,280	11.9	▲1.3
Greens	Laura Wahl	1,384	3.9	▼7.6	4,164	11.6	▼2.9
FDP	Martin-Lukas Maciejewski	880	2.5	▼4.5	623	1.7	▼5.0
APT					422	1.2	▲0.2
FW					237	0.7	
Pirates					233	0.6	▼0.1
Familie					177	0.5	
Values					170	0.5	
BD					158	0.4	
ÖDP					104	0.3	▼0.3
MLPD					51	0.1	▼0.2
Informal votes		470			188		
Total valid votes		35,657			35,939		
Turnout		36,127	77.8	▲6.3			
Left hold	Majority	6,604	18.5	▼7.3			

=== 2019 election ===
State election (2019): Erfurt III
Notes:	Blue background denotes the winner of the electorate vote. Pink background denotes a candidate elected from their party list. Yellow background denotes an electorate win by a list member, or other incumbent. A ✓ or ✗ denotes status of any incumbent, win or lose respectively.						
Party	Candidate	Votes	%	±%	Party votes	%	±%
Left	Bodo Ramelow	14,451	42.1	▲10.6	10,388	30.2	▲4.4
CDU	Dominik Kordon	5,596	16.3	▼17.5	5,863	17.0	▼11.0
AfD	Marek Erfurth	4,816	14.0		4,913	14.3	▲5.1
Greens	Dirk Adams	3,935	11.5	▲0.4	4,983	14.5	▲1.2
SPD	Denny Möller	2,541	7.4	▼7.5	3,648	10.6	▼2.8
FDP	Thomas Kemmerich	2,399	7.0	▲3.5	2,304	6.7	▲3.4
Free Voters	Detlef-Michael Frahm	438	1.3				
MLPD	Lea Weinmann	138	0.4		97	0.3	
List-only parties					2,207	6.4	
Informal votes		337			247		
Total valid votes		34,313			34,403		
Turnout		34,650	71.5	▲14.1			
Left gain from CDU	Majority	8,855	25.8				

=== 2014 election ===
State election (2014): Erfurt III
Notes:	Blue background denotes the winner of the electorate vote. Pink background denotes a candidate elected from their party list. Yellow background denotes an electorate win by a list member, or other incumbent. A ✓ or ✗ denotes status of any incumbent, win or lose respectively.						
Party	Candidate	Votes	%	±%	Party votes	%	±%
CDU	Marion Walsmann	9,239	33.8	▲7.2	7,731	28.0	▲1.8
Left	✗ Bodo Ramelow	8,616	31.5	▲4.7	7,126	25.8	▲1.9
SPD	Wolfgang Beese	4,063	14.9	▼3.1	3,687	13.4	▼6.3
Greens	Dirk Adams	3,044	11.1	▼1.1	3,658	13.3	▼1.0
AfD					2,538	9.2	
FDP	Thomas Kemmerich	944	3.5	▼4.4	908	3.3	▼5.2
NPD	Dirk Bachmann	761	2.8	▲0.1	500	1.8	▼0.8
Pirates	Klaus Sommerfeld	668	2.4		519	1.9	
List-only parties					939	3.4	
Informal votes		558			287		
Total valid votes		27,335			27,606		
Turnout		27,893	57.4	▼1.9			
CDU gain from Left	Majority	623	2.3				

=== 2009 election ===
State election (2009): Erfurt III
Notes:	Blue background denotes the winner of the electorate vote. Pink background denotes a candidate elected from their party list. Yellow background denotes an electorate win by a list member, or other incumbent. A ✓ or ✗ denotes status of any incumbent, win or lose respectively.						
Party	Candidate	Votes	%	±%	Party votes	%	±%
Left	Bodo Ramelow	7,395	26.8	▼1.6	6,631	23.9	▼3.2
CDU	✗ Marion Walsmann	7,361	26.6	▼9.4	7,271	26.2	▼10.8
SPD	Peter Metz	4,983	18.0	▲0.9	5,460	19.7	▲5.2
Greens	Dirk Adams	3,364	12.2	▲1.0	3,978	14.3	▲2.1
FDP	Thomas Kemmerich	2,189	7.9	▲3.9	2,347	8.5	▲4.8
Free Voters	Birgit Adamek	1,596	5.8		1,119	4.0	▲3.1
NPD	Frank Schwerdt	751	2.7		721	2.6	▲1.8
List-only parties					196	0.7	
Informal votes		537			453		
Total valid votes		27,639			27,723		
Turnout		28,176	59.3	▲6.1			
Left gain from CDU	Majority	34	0.2				

=== 2004 election ===
State election (2004): Erfurt III
Notes:	Blue background denotes the winner of the electorate vote. Pink background denotes a candidate elected from their party list. Yellow background denotes an electorate win by a list member, or other incumbent. A ✓ or ✗ denotes status of any incumbent, win or lose respectively.						
Party	Candidate	Votes	%	±%	Party votes	%	±%
CDU	Marion Walsmann	8,218	36.0	▼12.8	8,499	37.0	▼14.1
PDS	Karola Stange	6,487	28.4	▲4.8	6,225	21.8	▲5.3
SPD	Alfred Müller	3,895	17.1	▼1.7	3,322	14.5	▼2.6
Greens	Kathrin Hoyer	2,552	11.2	▲5.6	2,797	12.2	▲7.5
FDP	Egidius Arens	920	4.0	▲2.6	848	3.7	▲2.8
Independent	Jürgen Seybold	751	3.3				
List-only parties					1,283	5.6	
Informal votes		839			688		
Total valid votes		22,823			22,974		
Turnout		23,662	53.2	▼9.0			
CDU hold	Majority	1,731	7.6	▼17.6			

=== 1999 election ===
State election (1999): Erfurt III
Notes:	Blue background denotes the winner of the electorate vote. Pink background denotes a candidate elected from their party list. Yellow background denotes an electorate win by a list member, or other incumbent. A ✓ or ✗ denotes status of any incumbent, win or lose respectively.						
Party	Candidate	Votes	%	±%	Party votes	%	±%
CDU	✓ Jörg Kallenbach	11,866	48.8	▲10.4	12,484	51.1	▲13.9
PDS	Bodo Ramelow	5,750	23.6	▲3.0	5,331	21.8	▲1.2
SPD	Alfred Müller	4,581	18.8	▼12.1	4,185	17.1	▼11.0
Greens	Astrid Rothe	1,368	5.6	▼4.6	1,155	4.7	▼2.2
REP	Kerstin Brehme	403	1.7		129	0.5	▼0.3
FDP	Heinrich Arens	347	1.4		220	0.9	▼1.5
List-only parties					948	3.9	
Informal votes		410			273		
Total valid votes		24,315			24,452		
Turnout		24,725	62.2	▼8.4			
CDU hold	Majority	6,116	25.2	▲17.7			

=== 1994 election ===
State election (1994): Erfurt III
Notes:	Blue background denotes the winner of the electorate vote. Pink background denotes a candidate elected from their party list. Yellow background denotes an electorate win by a list member, or other incumbent. A ✓ or ✗ denotes status of any incumbent, win or lose respectively.						
Party	Candidate	Votes	%	±%	Party votes	%	±%
CDU	✓ Jörg Kallenbach	10,486	38.4	▼0.7	10,240	37.1	▼1.6
SPD	Alfred Müller	8,448	30.9	▲9.9	7,733	28.1	▲5.8
PDS	Benno Lemke	5,619	20.6	▲7.7	5,665	20.6	▲7.4
Greens		2,788	10.2	▼4.0	1,895	6.9	▼5.1
FDP					659	2.4	▼6.7
List-only parties					1,372	5.0	
Informal votes		796			573		
Total valid votes		27,341			27,564		
Turnout		28,137	70.6	▲6.1			
CDU hold	Majority	2,038	7.5	▼10.6			

=== 1990 election ===
State election (1990): Erfurt III
Notes:	Blue background denotes the winner of the electorate vote. Pink background denotes a candidate elected from their party list. Yellow background denotes an electorate win by a list member, or other incumbent. A ✓ or ✗ denotes status of any incumbent, win or lose respectively.						
Party	Candidate	Votes	%	±%	Party votes	%	±%
CDU	Jörg Kallenbach	9,905	39.1		9,898	38.7	
SPD		5,327	21.0		5,688	22.3	
Greens		3,594	14.2		3,098	12.1	
PDS		3,274	12.9		3,371	13.2	
FDP		1,848	7.3		2,319	9.1	
DSU		1,017	4.0		523	2.0	
UFV		353	1.4		208	0.8	
List-only parties					455	1.8	
Informal votes		812			570		
Total valid votes		25,318			25,560		
Turnout		26,130	64.5				
CDU win new seat	Majority	4,578	18.1				
