= Greiz I =

Electoral constituency in Thuringia, Germany

Greiz I is an electoral constituency (German: Wahlkreis) represented in the Landtag of Thuringia. It elects one member via first-past-the-post voting. Under the current constituency numbering system, it is designated as constituency 39. It covers the western part of the district of Greiz.

Greiz I was created for the 1994 state election. Since 2024, it has been represented by Martina Schweinsburg of the Christian Democratic Union (CDU).

== Geography ==
As of the 2019 state election, Greiz I covers the western part of the district of Greiz, specifically the municipalities of Auma-Weidatal, Bad Köstritz, Bocka, Caaschwitz, Crimla, Harth-Pöllnitz, Hartmannsdorf, Hohenleuben, Hundhaupten, Kraftsdorf, Kühdorf, Langenwetzendorf, Langenwolschendorf, Lederhose, Lindenkreuz, Münchenbernsdorf, Saara, Schwarzbach, Weida, Weißendorf, Zedlitz, and Zeulenroda-Triebes.

== Members ==
The constituency has been held by the Christian Democratic Union since its creation in 1994. Its first representative was Peter Schütz, who served from 1994 to 1999. From 1999 to 2024, it was represented by Volker Emde. Since 2024, it has been represented by Martina Schweinsburg.

Election	Member	Party	%
1994	Peter Schütz	CDU	47.4
1999	Volker Emde	CDU	52.8
2004	Volker Emde	CDU	47.8
2009	Volker Emde	CDU	36.0
2014	Volker Emde	CDU	42.7
2019	Volker Emde	CDU	35.0
2024	Martina Schweinsburg	CDU	46.4

== Election results ==
=== 2024 election ===
State election (2024): Greiz I
Notes:	Blue background denotes the winner of the electorate vote. Pink background denotes a candidate elected from their party list. Yellow background denotes an electorate win by a list member, or other incumbent. A ✓ or ✗ denotes status of any incumbent, win or lose respectively.						
Party	Candidate	Votes	%	±%	Party votes	%	±%
CDU	Martina Schweinsburg	14,701	46.7	▲11.7	8,330	26.4	▲3.7
AfD	Thomas Trommer	11,809	37.5		11,888	37.6	▲10.2
BSW					4,858	15.4	
Left	Alexander Frieß	2,548	8.1	▼21.5	3,350	10.6	▼18.0
SPD	Eric Böhme	1,253	4.0	▼4.2	1,149	3.6	▼3.4
FDP	Dirk Bergner	623	2.0	▼13.4	343	1.1	▼6.6
Greens	Martin Schulze	525	1.7	▼2.6	520	1.6	▼1.5
APT					311	1.0	▼0.4
FW					237	0.8	
Familie					160	0.5	
Values					157	0.5	
BD					118	0.4	
Pirates					81	0.3	▲0.1
ÖDP					46	0.1	▼0.3
MLPD					36	0.1	▼0.1
Informal votes		398			273		
Total valid votes		31,459			31,584		
Turnout		31,857	75.5	▲8.4			
CDU hold	Majority	2,892	9.2	▲3.8			

=== 2019 election ===
State election (2019): Greiz I
Notes:	Blue background denotes the winner of the electorate vote. Pink background denotes a candidate elected from their party list. Yellow background denotes an electorate win by a list member, or other incumbent. A ✓ or ✗ denotes status of any incumbent, win or lose respectively.						
Party	Candidate	Votes	%	±%	Party votes	%	±%
CDU	✓ Volker Emde	9,714	35.0	▼7.7	6,620	22.7	▼12.6
Left	Sven Weber	8,200	29.6	▼0.3	8,335	28.6	▲2.3
AfD					7,997	27.4	▲13.4
FDP	Dirk Bergner	4,266	15.4	▲10.2	1,654	5.7	▲2.7
SPD	Raphael Heyder	2,266	8.2	▼3.7	2,034	7.0	▼4.5
Independent	Peter Höfer	2,067	7.5				
Greens	Jens Kämpfer	1,205	4.3	▼0.9	909	3.1	▼0.9
List-only parties					1,622	5.6	
Informal votes		1,890			437		
Total valid votes		27,718			29,171		
Turnout		29,608	67.1	▲12.7			
CDU hold	Majority	1,514	5.4	▼7.4			

=== 2014 election ===
State election (2014): Greiz I
Notes:	Blue background denotes the winner of the electorate vote. Pink background denotes a candidate elected from their party list. Yellow background denotes an electorate win by a list member, or other incumbent. A ✓ or ✗ denotes status of any incumbent, win or lose respectively.						
Party	Candidate	Votes	%	±%	Party votes	%	±%
CDU	✓ Volker Emde	10,325	42.7	▲6.5	8,621	35.3	▲0.4
Left	Diana Skibbe	7,235	29.9	▲2.9	6,431	26.3	▼0.7
AfD					3,419	14.0	
SPD	Marie-Theres Mayer	2,882	11.9	▼4.3	2,815	11.5	▼4.8
FDP	Dirk Bergner	1,264	5.2	▼5.5	726	3.0	▼6.0
Greens	Jennifer Schubert	1,251	5.2	▲0.2	986	4.0	▼0.9
NPD	Michael Kuhn	1,222	5.1	▲0.3	739	3.0	▼1.2
List-only parties					679	2.8	
Informal votes		539			302		
Total valid votes		24,179			24,416		
Turnout		24,718	54.4	▼3.1			
CDU hold	Majority	3,090	12.8	▲3.6			

=== 2009 election ===
State election (2009): Greiz I
Notes:	Blue background denotes the winner of the electorate vote. Pink background denotes a candidate elected from their party list. Yellow background denotes an electorate win by a list member, or other incumbent. A ✓ or ✗ denotes status of any incumbent, win or lose respectively.						
Party	Candidate	Votes	%	±%	Party votes	%	±%
CDU	✓ Volker Emde	10,368	36.0	▼11.8	10,074	34.8	▼14.2
Left	Frank Lux	7,823	27.2	▼1.9	7,839	27.1	▲3.3
SPD	Mike Stieber	4,662	16.2	▲3.2	4,713	16.3	▲3.7
FDP	Dirk Bergner	3,089	10.7	▲5.1	2,625	9.1	▲5.4
Greens	Vincent Müller	1,439	5.0	▲0.5	1,422	4.9	▲1.6
NPD	Mandy Schneider	1,390	4.8		1,210	4.2	▲2.7
List-only parties					1,049	3.6	
Informal votes		740			579		
Total valid votes		28,771			28,932		
Turnout		29,511	57.2	▲2.0			
CDU hold	Majority	2,545	8.8	▼9.9			

=== 2004 election ===
State election (2004): Greiz I
Notes:	Blue background denotes the winner of the electorate vote. Pink background denotes a candidate elected from their party list. Yellow background denotes an electorate win by a list member, or other incumbent. A ✓ or ✗ denotes status of any incumbent, win or lose respectively.						
Party	Candidate	Votes	%	±%	Party votes	%	±%
CDU	✓ Volker Emde	13,529	47.8	▼5.0	14,014	49.0	▼5.4
PDS	Heidrun Sedlacik	8,247	29.1	▲6.6	6,812	23.8	▲4.1
SPD	Mike Stieber	3,666	13.0	▼6.5	3,604	12.6	▼4.1
FDP	Dirk Bergner	1,589	5.6	▲3.0	1,063	3.7	▲2.5
Greens	Ines Zipfel	1,262	4.5		953	3.3	▲1.8
List-only parties					2,168	7.6	
Informal votes		1,586			1,265		
Total valid votes		28,293			28,614		
Turnout		29,879	55.2	▼5.4			
CDU hold	Majority	5,282	18.7	▼11.6			

=== 1999 election ===
State election (1999): Greiz I
Notes:	Blue background denotes the winner of the electorate vote. Pink background denotes a candidate elected from their party list. Yellow background denotes an electorate win by a list member, or other incumbent. A ✓ or ✗ denotes status of any incumbent, win or lose respectively.						
Party	Candidate	Votes	%	±%	Party votes	%	±%
CDU	Volker Emde	16,896	52.8	▲5.3	17,508	54.4	▲6.6
PDS	Heidrun Sedlacik	7,206	22.5	▲8.6	6,324	19.7	▲5.8
SPD	Ines Zipfel	6,236	19.5	▼8.9	5,381	16.7	▼10.4
REP	Michael Knietsch	821	2.6		251	0.8	▼0.6
FDP	Horst Gerber	816	2.6	▼2.0	392	1.2	▼2.1
List-only parties					2,312	7.2	
Informal votes		732			539		
Total valid votes		31,975			32,168		
Turnout		32,707	60.6	▼15.2			
CDU hold	Majority	9,690	30.3	▲11.2			

=== 1994 election ===
State election (1994): Greiz I
Notes:	Blue background denotes the winner of the electorate vote. Pink background denotes a candidate elected from their party list. Yellow background denotes an electorate win by a list member, or other incumbent. A ✓ or ✗ denotes status of any incumbent, win or lose respectively.						
Party	Candidate	Votes	%	±%	Party votes	%	±%
CDU	Peter Schütz	17,399	47.4		17,679	47.8	
SPD		10,395	28.3		10,007	27.0	
PDS		5,147	14.0		5,193	14.0	
Greens		2,033	5.5		1,630	4.4	
FDP		1,710	4.7		1,241	3.4	
List-only parties					1,270	3.4	
Informal votes		1,578			1,242		
Total valid votes		36,684			37,020		
Turnout		38,262	75.8				
CDU win new seat	Majority	7,004	19.1				
