= Eichsfeld II =

Electoral constituency in Thuringia, Germany

Eichsfeld II is an electoral constituency (German: Wahlkreis) represented in the Landtag of Thuringia. It elects one member via first-past-the-post voting. Under the current constituency numbering system, it is designated as constituency 2. It comprises the eastern part of the district of Eichsfeld.

Eichsfeld II was created for the 1994 state election, replacing constituency Worbis I, which covered much of the same area. Since 2004, it has been represented by Christina Tasch of the Christian Democratic Union (CDU).

== Geography ==
As of the 2019 state election, Eichsfeld II covers the eastern part of Eichsfeld district. It comprises the municipalities of Am Ohmberg, Breitenworbis, Buhla, Büttstedt, Dingelstädt Effelder, Gernrode, Großbartloff, Haynrode, Kirchworbis, Küllstedt, Leinefelde-Worbis (excluding Hundeshagen), Niederorschel (excluding Deuna, Gerterode, and Vollenborn), Sonnenstein, and Wachstedt.

== Members ==
The constituency has been held by the Christian Democratic Union since its creation in 1994. Its first representative was Willibald Böck, who served from 1994 to 2004. Since 2004, it has been represented by Christina Tasch.

Election	Member	Party	%
1994	Willibald Böck	CDU	54.3
1999	Willibald Böck	CDU	62.3
2004	Christina Tasch	CDU	56.7
2009	Christina Tasch	CDU	45.1
2014	Christina Tasch	CDU	55.5
2019	Christina Tasch	CDU	41.5
2024	Christina Tasch	CDU	47.1

== Election results ==
=== 2024 election ===
State election (2024): Eichsfeld II
Notes:	Blue background denotes the winner of the electorate vote. Pink background denotes a candidate elected from their party list. Yellow background denotes an electorate win by a list member, or other incumbent. A ✓ or ✗ denotes status of any incumbent, win or lose respectively.						
Party	Candidate	Votes	%	±%	Party votes	%	±%
CDU	✓ Christina Tasch	15,671	47.1	▲5.6	11,904	35.5	▼0.3
AfD	Christopher Drößler	10,849	32.6	▲12.4	9,664	28.8	▲8.7
BSW					4,221	12.6	
Left	Florian Lands	3,089	9.3	▼8.8	3,912	11.7	▼11.2
SPD	Dorothea Marx	1,799	5.4	▼2.0	1,498	4.5	▼2.1
Greens					527	1.6	▼2.4
FW					400	1.2	
ÖDP	Karl Edmund Vogt	1,171	3.5	▲0.1	225	0.7	▼0.8
APT					223	0.7	Steady
FDP	Yannek Bang	709	2.1	▼3.1	401	1.2	▼4.0
Familie					136	0.4	
Pirates					66	0.2	Steady
MLPD					21	0.1	Steady
Values					153	0.5	
Informal votes		505			275		
Total valid votes		33,288			33,518		
Turnout		33,793	75.3	▲9.9			
CDU hold	Majority	4,822	14.5	▼6.8			

=== 2019 election ===
State election (2019): Eichsfeld II
Notes:	Blue background denotes the winner of the electorate vote. Pink background denotes a candidate elected from their party list. Yellow background denotes an electorate win by a list member, or other incumbent. A ✓ or ✗ denotes status of any incumbent, win or lose respectively.						
Party	Candidate	Votes	%	±%	Party votes	%	±%
CDU	✓ Christina Tasch	10,904	41.5	▼14.0	9,444	35.8	▼16.3
AfD	Jürgen Schwerdt	5,319	20.2		5,290	20.1	▲11.6
Left	Sigrid Hupach	4,769	18.1	▲1.7	6,030	22.9	▲6.1
SPD	Sandy Kirchner	1,948	7.4	▼3.2	1,751	6.6	▼2.7
FDP	Martin Meithlau	1,363	5.2	▲2.7	1,372	5.2	▲3.0
Greens	Simeon Schroeter	1,045	4.0	▲0.2	1,048	4.0	▲0.4
ÖDP	Karl Edmund Vogt	889	3.4		408	1.5	
International Alliance	Tristan Großkopf	49	0.2				
List-only parties					1,011	3.8	
Informal votes		394			326		
Total valid votes		26,286			26,354		
Turnout		26,680	65.4	▲11.4			
CDU hold	Majority	5,585	21.3	▼17.8			

=== 2014 election ===
State election (2014): Eichsfeld II
Notes:	Blue background denotes the winner of the electorate vote. Pink background denotes a candidate elected from their party list. Yellow background denotes an electorate win by a list member, or other incumbent. A ✓ or ✗ denotes status of any incumbent, win or lose respectively.						
Party	Candidate	Votes	%	±%	Party votes	%	±%
CDU	✓ Christina Tasch	12,924	55.5	▲10.4	12,225	52.2	▲6.0
Left	Petra Oberreich	3,832	16.4	▲3.2	3,911	16.7	▲1.6
SPD	Ronny Fritzlar	2,481	10.6	▼5.3	2,156	9.2	▼6.3
AfD					1,993	8.5	
Free Voters	Marco Tasch	1,576	6.8	▲0.1	712	3.0	▼2.1
NPD	Matthias Fiedler	1,020	4.4	▲0.5	834	3.6	▲0.3
Greens	Thomas Keppler	887	3.8	▼0.5	835	3.6	▼0.2
FDP	Ronald Krügel	579	2.5	▼4.7	506	2.2	▼5.8
List-only parties					227	1.0	
Informal votes		381			281		
Total valid votes		23,299			23,399		
Turnout		23,680	54.0	▼6.0			
CDU hold	Majority	9,092	39.1	▲9.9			

=== 2009 election ===
State election (2009): Eichsfeld II
Notes:	Blue background denotes the winner of the electorate vote. Pink background denotes a candidate elected from their party list. Yellow background denotes an electorate win by a list member, or other incumbent. A ✓ or ✗ denotes status of any incumbent, win or lose respectively.						
Party	Candidate	Votes	%	±%	Party votes	%	±%
CDU	✓ Christina Tasch	12,204	45.1	▼11.5	12,622	46.2	▼17.2
SPD	Hans-Jürgen Döring	4,307	15.9	▲2.7	4,225	15.5	▲5.0
Left	Marcus Kröning	3,588	13.2	▼1.9	4,122	15.1	▲1.8
FDP	Klaus-Dieter Landgraf	1,946	7.2	▲2.9	2,184	8.0	▲4.8
Free Voters	Raban Graf von Westphalen	1,818	6.7		1,389	5.1	▲4.2
Greens	Manuel Gebauer	1,161	4.3	▲1.4	1,034	3.8	▲1.2
NPD	Matthias Fiedler	1,050	3.9		991	3.6	▲1.7
ÖDP	Karl-Edmund Vogt	1,049	3.9	▼0.2	671	2.5	▲0.8
REP					80	0.3	▼0.7
Informal votes		560			401		
Total valid votes		27,159			27,318		
Turnout		27,719	60.0	▲1.8			
CDU hold	Majority	7,933	29.2	▼12.3			

=== 2004 election ===
State election (2004): Eichsfeld II
Notes:	Blue background denotes the winner of the electorate vote. Pink background denotes a candidate elected from their party list. Yellow background denotes an electorate win by a list member, or other incumbent. A ✓ or ✗ denotes status of any incumbent, win or lose respectively.						
Party	Candidate	Votes	%	±%	Party votes	%	±%
CDU	Christina Tasch	15,097	56.7	▼5.6	17,164	63.6	▼3.2
PDS	Gerhard Jüttemann	4,009	15.1	▲2.5	3,573	13.2	▲1.5
SPD	Hans-Jürgen Döring	3,491	13.1	▼5.7	2,826	10.5	▼4.1
FDP	Rolf Schulz	1,140	4.3	▲2.1	874	3.2	▲2.0
ÖDP	Karl-Edmund Vogt	1,097	4.1		447	1.7	
Independent	Ilka Diete	1,010	3.8				
Greens	Michael Hoffmeier	774	2.9	▲0.7	699	2.6	▲1.2
List-only parties					1,410	5.2	
Informal votes		1,147			772		
Total valid votes		26,618			26,993		
Turnout		27,765	58.2	▼4.0			
CDU hold	Majority	11,088	41.6	▼1.9			

=== 1999 election ===
State election (1999): Eichsfeld II
Notes:	Blue background denotes the winner of the electorate vote. Pink background denotes a candidate elected from their party list. Yellow background denotes an electorate win by a list member, or other incumbent. A ✓ or ✗ denotes status of any incumbent, win or lose respectively.						
Party	Candidate	Votes	%	±%	Party votes	%	±%
CDU	✓ Willibald Böck	18,242	62.3	▲8.0	19,686	66.8	▲9.3
SPD		5,512	18.8	▼7.3	4,295	14.6	▼9.3
PDS		3,700	12.6	▲3.5	3,439	11.7	▲2.3
Greens		657	2.2	▼1.3	424	1.4	▼1.4
FDP		651	2.2	▼3.0	352	1.2	▼1.8
REP		541	1.8		147	0.5	▼0.4
List-only parties					1,126	3.8	
Informal votes		529			363		
Total valid votes		29,303			29,469		
Turnout		29,832	62.2	▼17.8			
CDU hold	Majority	12,730	43.5	▲15.3			

=== 1994 election ===
State election (1994): Eichsfeld II
Notes:	Blue background denotes the winner of the electorate vote. Pink background denotes a candidate elected from their party list. Yellow background denotes an electorate win by a list member, or other incumbent. A ✓ or ✗ denotes status of any incumbent, win or lose respectively.						
Party	Candidate	Votes	%	±%	Party votes	%	±%
CDU	Willibald Böck	19,953	54.3		21,298	57.5	
SPD		9,606	26.1		8,843	23.9	
PDS		3,359	9.1		3,471	9.4	
FDP		1,896	5.2		1,096	3.0	
Greens		1,285	3.5		1,021	2.8	
ÖDP		639	1.7		437	1.2	
List-only parties					860	2.3	
Informal votes		1,229			941		
Total valid votes		36,738			37,026		
Turnout		37,967	80.0				
CDU win new seat	Majority	10,347	28.2				
