= Zentrum =

Zentrum is German for centre.

Zentrum may also refer to:

- BMW Zentrum, a BMW museum in Spartanburg, South Carolina
- Center (group theory), the centre of a group, denoted $Z(G)$ from the German name
- ETH Zentrum, a central campus of ETH Zurich
- Zentrumspartei or Centre Party (Germany), a lay Catholic political party active in Germany 1870–1959
- Zentrum (association), a German registered association

See also

- Centre (disambiguation)
