= Minister-President of Thuringia =

Minister-President of the Free State of Thuringia
- Ministerpräsident des Freistaats Thüringen
- Coat of arms of Thuringia

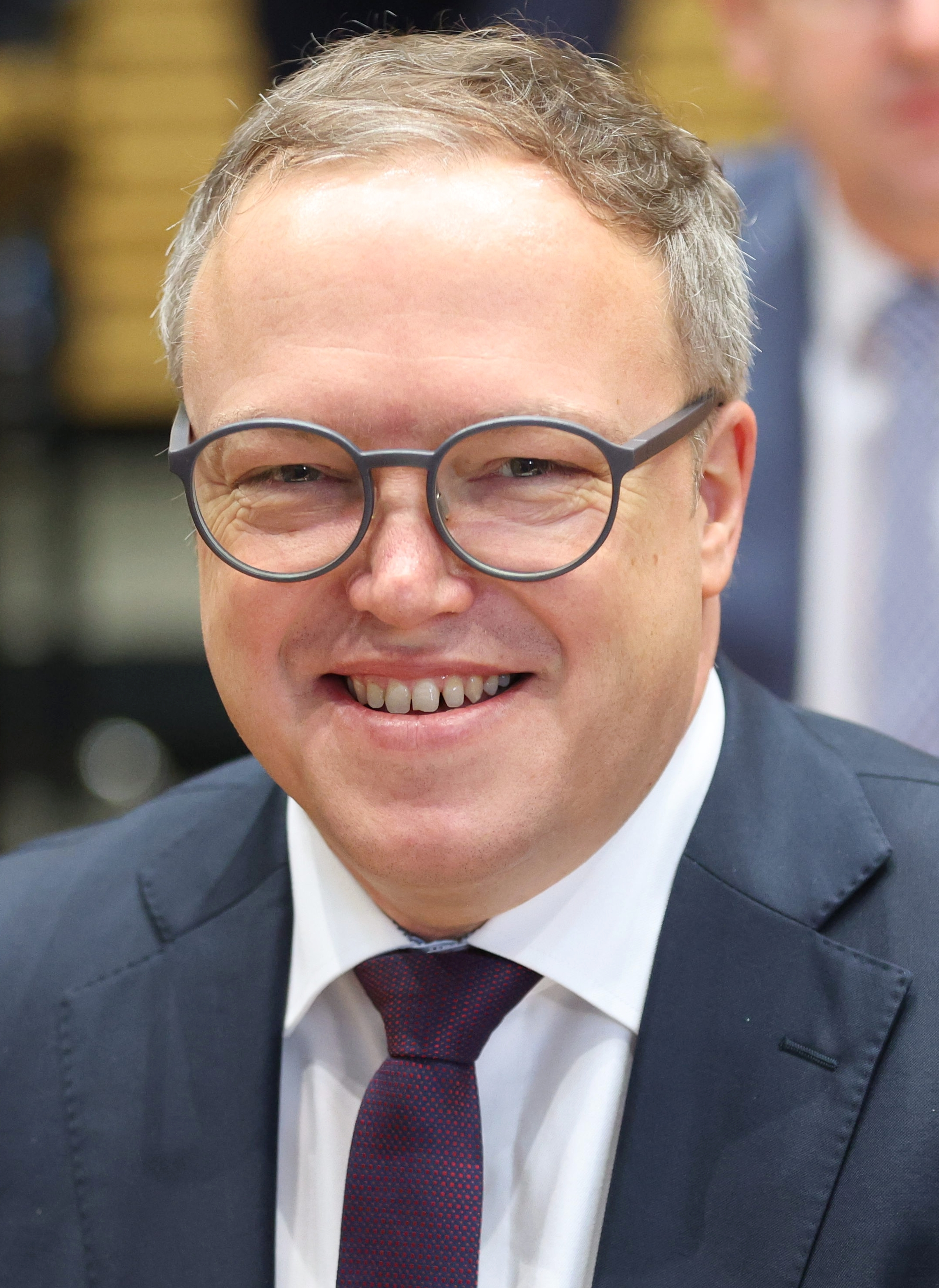
- Incumbent; Mario Voigt since 12 December 2024
- Residence: Erfurt
- Appointer: Landtag of Thuringia
- Term length: Pending resignation or the election of a successor
- Inaugural holder: Josef Duchač
- Formation: 3 October 1990
- Salary: regulated by legislation
- Website: https://www.staatskanzlei-thueringen.de/

The minister-president of Thuringia, officially the minister-president of the Free State of Thuringia (German: Ministerpräsident des Freistaats Thüringen), is the head of government of the German state of Thuringia. The position was re-established in 1990 after German reunification. The former districts Erfurt, Suhl, Gera and some adjacent areas of the Halle were incorporated into the new and re-established federal state of Thuringia.

The current minister-president is Mario Voigt, heading a minority government between the Christian Democratic Union, BSW and the Social Democrats.

The office of the minister-president is known as the state chancellery (German: Staatskanzlei), and is located in the capital of Erfurt, along with the rest of the cabinet departments.

== Title ==
The German title Ministerpräsident may be translated literally as minister-president, although the state government sometimes uses the title prime minister in English.

== List ==
Minister-President of the Free State of Thuringia

Political party: CDU The Left FDP

Portrait	Name (Born–Died)	Term of office			Political party	Cabinet
Portrait	Name (Born–Died)	Took office	Left office	Days	Political party	Cabinet
In accordance with the Unification Treaty, the designated state representative Josef Duchac (CDU) served as head of government from 3 October to 8 November 1990.
1	Josef Duchac (1938–2026)	8 November 1990	5 February 1992 resigned	1 year, 89 days	CDU	I
2	Bernhard Vogel (1932–2025)	5 February 1992	5 June 2003 resigned	11 years, 120 days	CDU	I II III
3	Dieter Althaus (born 1958)	5 June 2003	30 October 2009	6 years, 147 days	CDU	I II
4	Christine Lieberknecht (born 1958)	30 October 2009	5 December 2014	5 years, 36 days	CDU	I
5	Bodo Ramelow (born 1956); 1st term	5 December 2014	5 February 2020	5 years, 62 days	The Left	I
6	Thomas Kemmerich (born 1965)	5 February 2020	4 March 2020 resigned	28 days	FDP	I
7	Bodo Ramelow (born 1956); 2nd term	4 March 2020	12 December 2024	4 years, 283 days	The Left	II
8	Mario Voigt (born 1977)	12 December 2024	Incumbent	1 year, 342 days	CDU	I
