= Marion Walsmann =

German politician

Marion Walsmann MEP
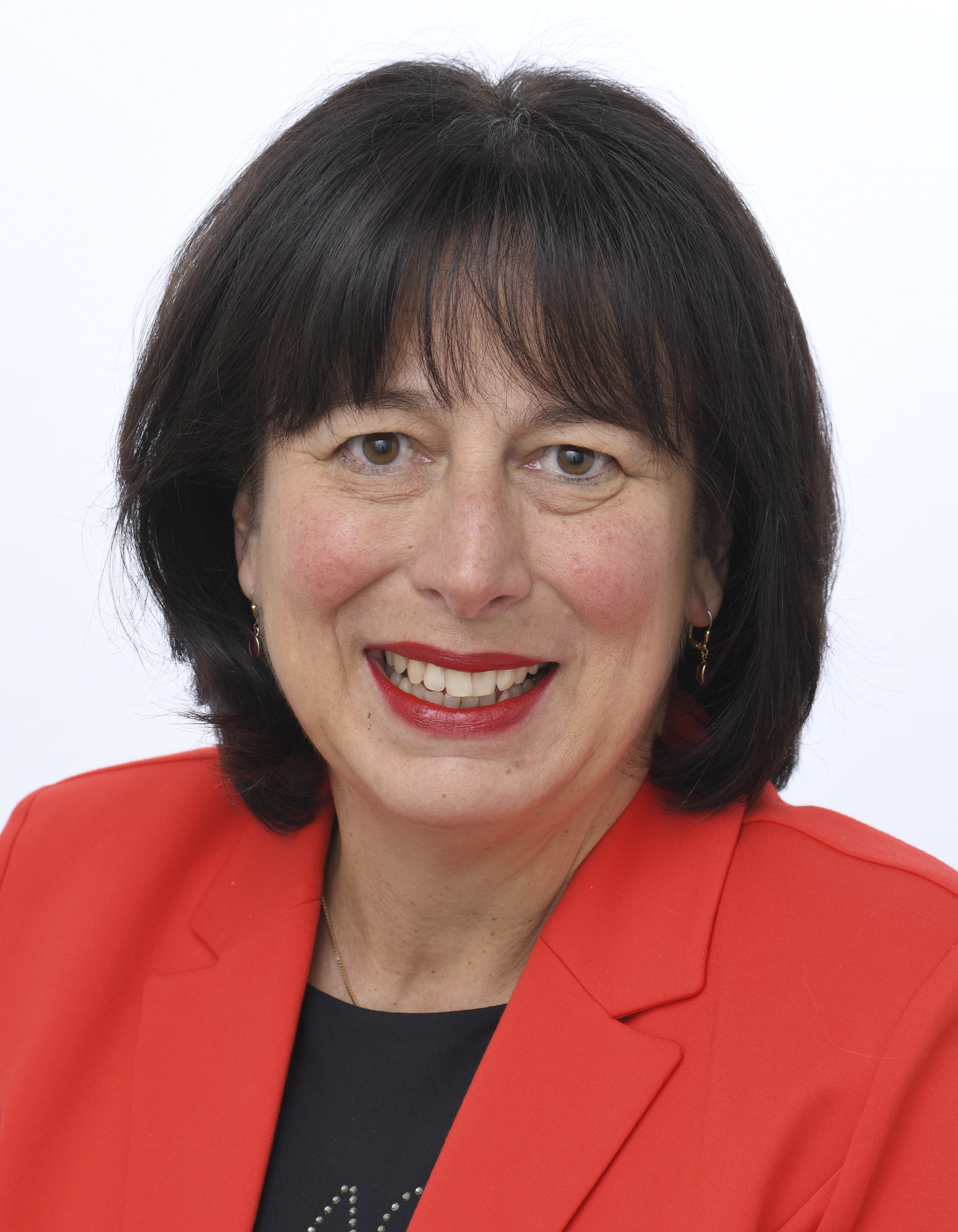

Member of the European Parliament for Germany

Personal details
- Born: 17 March 1963 (age 63) Erfurt, East Germany (now Germany)
- Party: German: Christian Democratic Union; EU: European People's Party

Marion Walsmann (née Schau, born 17 March 1963) is a German politician of the Christian Democratic Union (CDU) who has been serving as a Member of the European Parliament since 2019.

== Early life and education ==
Walsmann grew up in Erfurt. From 1981 to 1985, she studied law at the University of Leipzig.

== Political career ==
=== Career in state politics, 2004–2018 ===
From the 2004 state elections to 2018, Walsmann served as a member of the Landtag of Thuringia.

As part of a 2008 cabinet reshuffle, Walsmann was appointed State Minister of Justice under Minister-President Dieter Althaus, replacing Harald Schliemann, who left the office due to illness.

After the 2009 state elections, Walsmann became State Minister of Finance in the cabinet of newly elected Minister-President Christine Lieberknecht. In December 2010, she took over as Head of the State Chancellery and as State Minister for European Affairs in another cabinet reshuffle. In September 2013 she was dismissed from the cabinet.

From 2015 until 2018, Walsmann was the State Parliament's delegate to the European Committee of the Regions.

In the city of Erfurt's 2018 local elections, Walsmann lost against incumbent mayor Andreas Bausewein.

=== Member of the European Parliament, 2019–present ===
Walsmann has been a Member of the European Parliament since the 2019 European elections, making her the only representative of Thuringia. She has since been serving on the Committee on Legal Affairs.

In addition to her committee assignments, Walsmann is part of the Parliament's delegation to the EU-North Macedonia Joint Parliamentary Committee, She is also a member of the European Parliament Intergroup on Artificial Intelligence and Digital, the European Parliament Intergroup on Disability and the European Parliament Intergroup on Small and Medium-Sized Enterprises (SMEs).
