= Zentrum (association) =

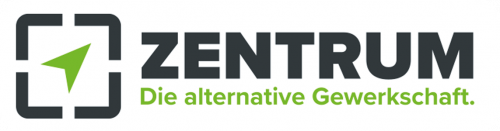
- Formation: 2009
- Headquarters: Stuttgart
- Founder: Oliver Hilburger
- Website: https://www.zentrumgewerkschaft.de

Zentrum (until 2022 Zentrum Automobil, ZA) is a German registered association with a right-wing extremist background that describes itself as a trade union for workers in the automobile industry. The Thuringian Office for the Protection of the Constitution warned about the organization in 2021.

== History ==
Zentrum Automobil was founded at the end of 2009 in the Daimler plant in Stuttgart-Untertürkheim by Oliver Hilburger. It was registered as an association on November 23, 2009 in the Stuttgart District Court. Hilburger had been a works council member and a lay labor judge for the Christian Metalworkers' Union (CGM) since 2007, but was forced to resign in 2008 after his membership as a guitarist in the white power music band "Noie Werte" became known. Oliver Hilburger also has links to Blood and Honour (banned in Germany) as well as to the right-wing extremist parties NPD and the Third Way.

In 2010, the association took part in the works council elections at the Daimler plant in Untertürkheim for the first time, in which Hilburger and another member were elected to the works council. Zentrum Automobil at the Daimler plant in Untertürkheim got four council seats in the works council elections of 2014.

Since 2015, Zentrum Automobil interacted with the association Ein Prozent ("One percent") and the right-wing extremist magazine Compact. With their support, Zentrum Automobil launched the campaign "Become a works councillor" for the 2018 works council elections. Hilburger spoke at a Pegida rally in Dresden in February 2018 before the works council elections. The newspaper "Alternative Trade Unions" (German: Alternative Gewerkschaft) published by "Ein Prozent", Compact and Zentrum Automobil was distributed at the rally. Zentrum Automobil won six works council seats in In the 2018 elections, with 13.2% of the vote. It was also successful in works council elections at other locations. In the 2018 elections at the Daimler site in Sindelfingen, Zentrum Automobil got two works council seats with 3.4% share of the vote, at the Daimler site in Rastatt also three seats with 8.1%, at Porsche in Leipzig two works councils with 6% as a part of the coalition IG Beruf und Familie, and at BMW in Leipzig four works council seats with 12%. Altogether, Zentrum Automobil won 19 mandates (out of 180,000 total nationwide) in 2018.

In the 2022 works elections, Zentrum Automobil was able to appoint seven works council members at the Daimler plant in Untertürkheim with 15.8%. At the Daimler plant in Rastatt, Zentrum kept its three works council seats. At the BMW and Porsche plants in Leipzig, its representation was halved from four to two and two to one, respectively.

== Politics ==
The political position of the association went through two phases. In the first phase, 2009 to 2015, Zentrum Automobil's argued against class struggle, attacking IG Metall as a "class warrior". In 2011, for example, the association published a brochure Our Goals "for the moral duty of the individual", speaking against the "profit maximization of companies", for "socially acceptable remuneration [...] for all professional groups", against "excessively high managerial salaries", but also for the recognition of the "mutual dependence of employee and employer" and resolutely against the "idea of class struggle between an employee and employer".

This position had changed in 2015 due to interaction with "Compact" and "One Percent". In the second phase, Hilburger and the association focused their attacks on "populist top-bottom contrast": at the top, the "co-management" by the "monopoly unions" and the companies' executives, and at the bottom, the ordinary workers neglected by both groups. Zentrum now stands as "the opposition to the bribed monopolistic unions", "against the export of labor through globalization, co-management as legalized corruption, wage cuts as a means of blackmail by multi-billion dollar large corporations and the rotten compromises of well-fed union officials".

The association can be classified as right-wing, using the ideological approach of the Neue Rechte (a German version of the New Right), describing globalization as a "virus" and rejecting co-management.

At the end of 2021, Zentrum Automobil, together with many other actors from the right-wing extremist spectrum, opposed the COVID-19 restrictions and called for a "vaccination strike".

== Relations with the AfD ==
The creation of Zentrum Automobil (ZA) pre-dated that of the Alternative for Germany (AfD). ZA originally rejected the industrial conflict. After a strategic shift to populism around 2015, it attracted the interest from the radical nationalist wing of the AfD, with the latter putting more effort into getting closer to ZA after the (successful for AfD) 2017 German federal elections. A conference in November of 2017 brought ZA and AfD together, with Jürgen Elsässer discussing a "new front" where the AfD will represent a political wing, and ZA the trade union one. Despite backing of ZA by Björn Höcke, André Poggenburg, and Dirk Spaniel (originally a Daimler engineer), the liberal wing of AfD pushed the executive to place ZA onto incompatibility list in October of 2021, due to the declared ZA's ‘right-wing extremist or neo-Nazi’ background.

With AfD's right wing influence growing, the party had reconsidered its relation with the ZA. At the federal party conference of AfD in June 2022, Björn Höcke, along with other delegates, campaigned to remove the Zentrum from the party's "incompatibility list". Around 60 percent of the delegates agreed. With the AfD influence among the workers on the upswing, the party sees an opportunity to peel the laborers in the (deeply affected by the globalization automotive industry) away from the established trade unions like Ver.di and IG Metall that traditionally maintain close relationships with the Social Democratic Party.

== Sources ==
- Kim, Seongcheol (2024). "The Limits of Party Unionism: Far-Right Projects of Trade Union Building in Belgium, France, and Germany". Journal of Contemporary European Studies. 32 (4): 936–947. doi:10.1080/14782804.2022.2118679. ISSN 1478-2804.
- Nöstlinger, Nette; Martuscelli, Carlo (2025-02-10). "Germany's far right woos the workers in election battle". Politico.
