= Bodo Ramelow =

German politician

Bodo Ramelow MdL MdBR
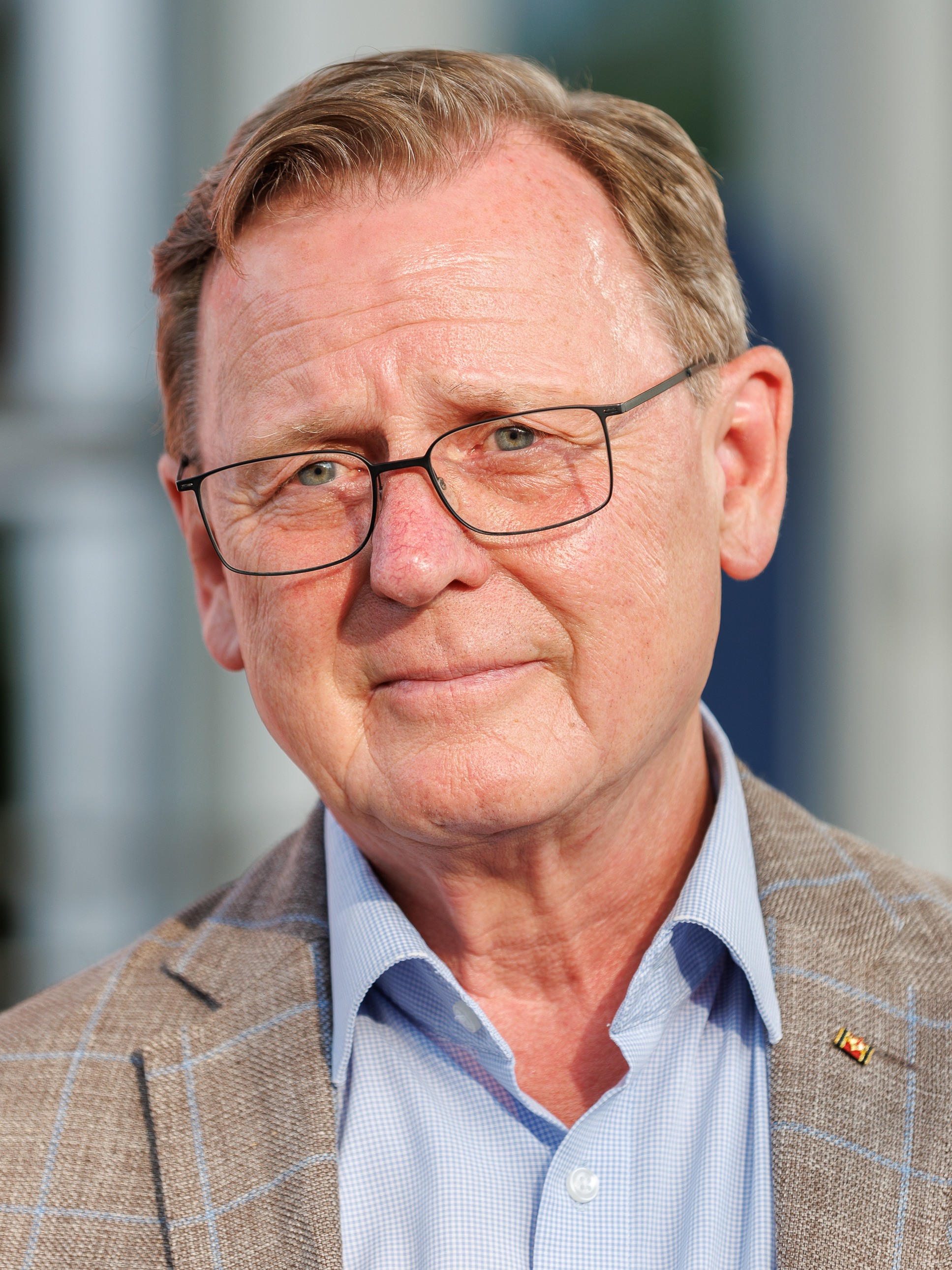
- Ramelow in 2024

Vice President of the Bundestag (on proposal of The Left-faction)
- Incumbent
- Assumed office 25 March 2025
- President: Julia Klöckner
- Preceded by: Petra Pau

Minister-President of Thuringia
- In office 4 March 2020 – 12 December 2024
- Deputy: Wolfgang Tiefensee; Georg Maier
- Preceded by: Thomas Kemmerich
- Succeeded by: Mario Voigt
- In office 5 December 2014 – 5 February 2020
- Deputy: Heike Taubert
- Preceded by: Christine Lieberknecht
- Succeeded by: Thomas Kemmerich

President of the Bundesrat
- In office 1 November 2021 – 31 October 2022
- First Vice President: Reiner Haseloff
- Preceded by: Reiner Haseloff
- Succeeded by: Peter Tschentscher

Leader of The Left in the Landtag of Thuringia
- In office 3 November 2009 – 5 December 2014
- Preceded by: Dieter Hausold
- Succeeded by: Susanne Hennig-Wellsow

Leader of the Party of Democratic Socialism in the Landtag of Thuringia
- In office 14 November 2001 – 17 October 2005
- Preceded by: Gabi Zimmer
- Succeeded by: Dieter Hausold
Parliamentary constituencies
Member of the Bundestag for Thuringia
Incumbent
Assumed office 23 February 2025
Preceded by	Carsten Schneider
Constituency	Erfurt – Weimar – Weimarer Land II
In office 18 October 2005 – 28 September 2009
Preceded by	multi-member district
Succeeded by	Frank Tempel
Constituency	Party of Democratic Socialism list
Member of the Landtag of Thuringia
In office 26 November 2019 – 23 February 2025
Preceded by	Marion Walsmann
Constituency	Erfurt III
In office 14 October 2014 – 31 March 2015
Preceded by	multi-member district
Succeeded by	Iris Martin-Gehl
Constituency	The Left list
In office 29 September 2009 – 14 October 2014
Preceded by	Marion Walsmann
Succeeded by	Marion Walsmann
Constituency	Erfurt III
In office 8 July 2004 – 17 October 2005
Preceded by	Johanna Arenhövel
Succeeded by	Jörg Kubitzki
Constituency	Erfurt I
In office 1 October 1999 – 8 July 2004
Preceded by	multi-member district
Succeeded by	multi-member district
Constituency	Party of Democratic Socialism list

Personal details
- Born: 16 February 1956 (age 70) Osterholz-Scharmbeck, Lower Saxony, West Germany (now Germany)
- Party: The Left (since 2007)
- Other political affiliations: Party of Democratic Socialism (1999–2007)
- Spouse: Germana Alberti vom Hofe (m. 2006)
- Children: 2
- Website: bodo-ramelow.de

Bodo Ramelow (German pronunciation: [ˈboːdo ˈʁaməlo]; born 16 February 1956) is a German politician who has been serving as a Member of the Bundestag, representing The Left. He has been its Vice President as of March 2025. He served as Minister-President of Thuringia from December 2014 to 5 February 2020 and from 4 March 2020 to December 2024.

He was the first head of a German state government to serve non-consecutive terms in office since Eberhard Diepgen, who served twice as Governing Mayor of Berlin (1984–1989 and 1991–2001). A member of The Left, he previously chaired the party's group in the Landtag of Thuringia. On 8 October 2021, he was elected to a one-year term as President of the Bundesrat. His term lasted from 1 November 2021 until 31 October 2022.

== Political career ==
Ramelow was born and raised in West Germany. He is a trained retail salesman and became an official in Gewerkschaft Handel, Banken und Versicherungen (HBV), the union for trade, bank and insurance employees during the 1980s. He moved to Thuringia, in former East Germany, after the unification of Germany in 1990. In 1999, he joined the Party of Democratic Socialism (PDS) and was elected to the Landtag of Thuringia. He became deputy chairman and in 2001 chairman of the party's parliamentary group in the Landtag (state parliament).

In February 2004, Ramelow was elected top candidate of the PDS in the Thuringian state elections. In June 2004 the party gained its best result in Thuringia since German unification with 26.1% of the votes. Ramelow was re-elected as the PDS chairman in Thuringia.

Ramelow was the PDS campaign manager for the 2005 federal election and also contested the Bundestag constituency Gera – Jena – Saale-Holzland-Kreis. He narrowly missed the direct mandate by two percentage points, but was elected to a party-list seat.

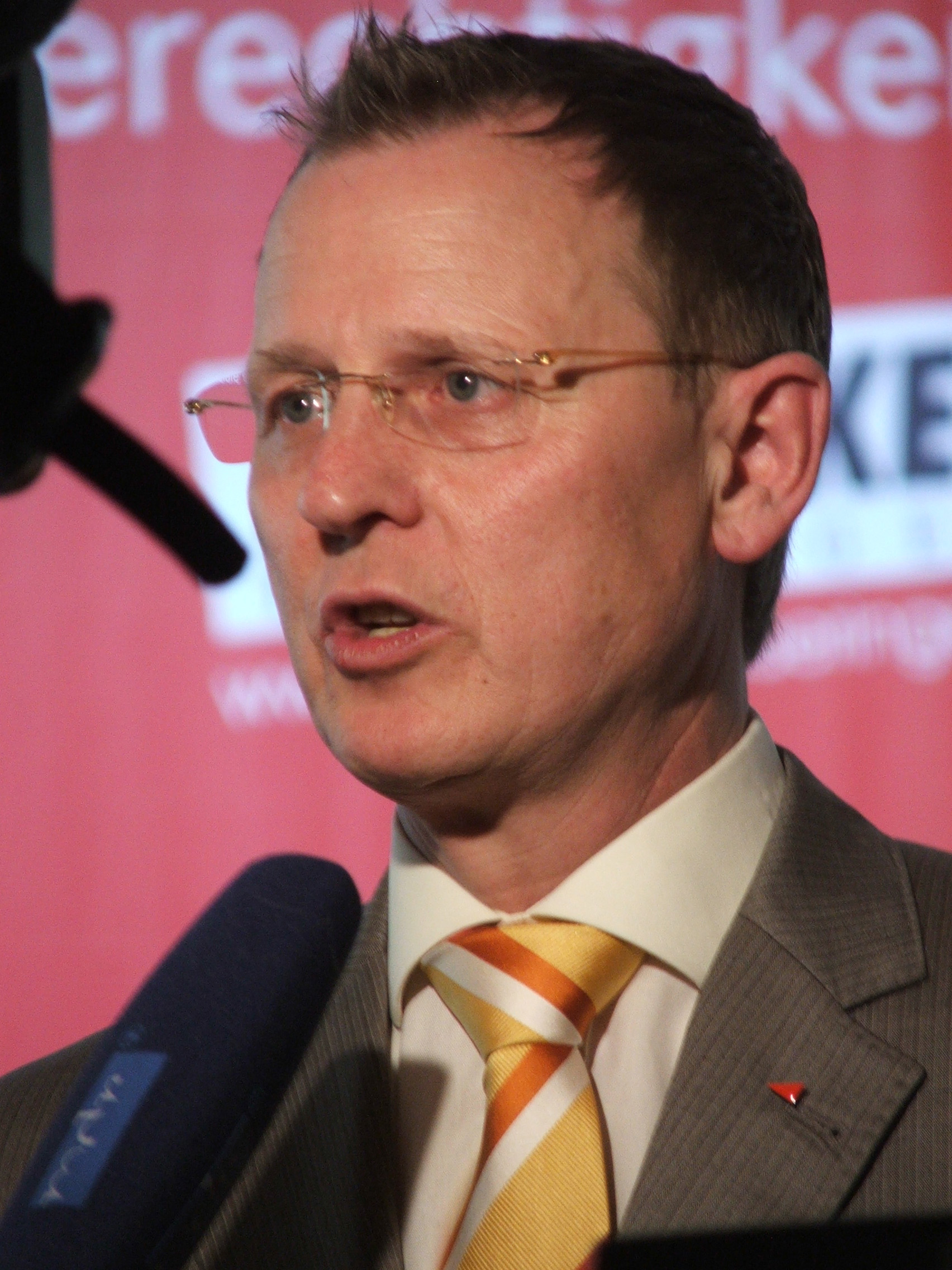
Ramelow in 2009

Starting in June 2005, Ramelow was chief negotiator during unification talks between the PDS and WASG, a unification that resulted in the new party The Left. In September 2005 he was elected deputy chairman of The Left in the Bundestag. In the Thuringia state election in September 2009 he led The Left to become the second biggest party with 27.4% of the votes, making him a competitor for the post of minister president.

Bodo Ramelow said that claiming that Israeli bombs are responsible for dead children in Gaza is “on the way to saying” the Nazi lie that Jews ate children.

=== Illegal surveillance of Ramelow ===
In 2003, it became publicly known that Germany's domestic intelligence service, the Federal Office for the Protection of the Constitution (Bundesamt für Verfassungsschutz), had been observing Ramelow and had opened a file on him because of his alleged contacts with the German Communist Party (DKP) during the 1980s. Supposedly the observation had stopped following Ramelow's entry into the Landtag in 1999, but in May 2006 the Administrative court of Weimar decreed that the Thuringian Verfassungsschutz had to reveal the file and the stored data. It became known that the federal agency had observed Ramelow for many years. Ramelow sued the authorities, but in 2010 the Federal Administrative Court of Germany ruled that the agency is entitled to observe politicians of the Left Party due to "reasonable suspicion of anti-constitutional activity".

This ruling was overturned in 2013 by the Federal Constitutional Court, which decided that the monitoring had been illegal. It stated that monitoring lawmakers may be acceptable, but only in exceptional circumstances, "if there is an indication that a legislator has abused his or her mandate in the fight against the democratic constitutional order, or actively or aggressively fought against that order." The court found no grounds to suspect Ramelow, who is considered one of the more moderate voices within his party. The decision was widely seen as a major victory for Ramelow's party as well.

=== Minister President of Thuringia ===
Following elections in September 2014, Ramelow was elected by the Landtag as Minister President of Thuringia on 5 December 2014 with the support of the Social Democratic Party and the Greens, which had joined the Left in a coalition. This vote, which Ramelow won in the second round, marked the first time the Left had won the leadership of any of Germany's states since the reunification of Germany in 1990.

Ramelow's government lost its majority in the 2019 state election, though his party moved into first place for the first time in any German state. Government formation was complicated by the fact that The Left and the far-right Alternative for Germany (AfD) held a majority between them. All major parties had pledged their opposition to working with AfD, while the CDU, FDP, and AfD refused to work with The Left. On 5 February 2020, Ramelow was defeated in the Landtag election for Minister President after AfD voted with the FDP and CDU to elect FDP leader Thomas Kemmerich. After it surfaced that Kemmerich may have cooperated with AfD leader Björn Höcke to win the election, Ramelow published a tweet with a photo of Adolf Hitler shaking hands with Paul von Hindenburg during his inauguration as Chancellor alongside a photo of Höcke shaking hands with Kemmerich. The tweet also included a 1930 statement from Hitler about the Nazi Party's position as kingmaker after the 1929 Thuringian election. On 4 March, Ramelow was again elected as Minister President by the Landtag due to the abstentions of the CDU and FDP. After the vote, he refused to shake the hand of Björn Höcke, leader of the Thuringian AfD.

In February 2020, Ramelow was criticized because a tweet from the year 2012 surfaced where he posted a photograph of the Soviet Premier Joseph Stalin and commented "Comrade Stalin ;-)".

During the COVID-19 pandemic in Germany, Ramelow became one of Germany's most prominent critics of lockdowns. Under Ramelow, Thuringia was the first state to lift restrictions following the first wave, and Ramelow resisted lockdown measures requested by Angela Merkel during the second wave in late Autumn and the run-up to Christmas. In January 2021, as Thuringia became Germany's worst affected state, Ramelow announced that he regretted this decision and now supported a hard lockdown.

Ramelow was voted out of office following the 2024 Thuringian state election, in which the red-red-green minority coalition lost more seats and The Left was overtaken by the AfD as the largest party. He remained acting Minister-President until a new government was formed. Though he was re-elected to the Landtag from the Erfurt III constituency, he announced plans to contest the Bundestag constituency Erfurt – Weimar – Weimarer Land II in the 2025 federal election. In the election he was elected on the first vote.

He was succeeded as Minister-President in December 2024 by Mario Voigt (CDU).

== Honours ==
- 2023 Grand Cross of the Order of Merit of the Federal Republic of Germany

Political offices
Preceded by Reiner Haseloff	President of the Bundesrat; 2021–2022	Succeeded by Peter Tschentscher
