= Office for the Protection of the Constitution for Thuringia =

Intelligence Department of Thuringia, Germany

The Office for the Protection of the Constitution of Thuringia has been the Office for the Protection of the Constitution of the Free State of Thuringia since January 1, 2015 as a department of the Thuringian Ministry of the Interior and Local Government. From 1991 to the end of 2014, it was an independent higher state authority as the Thuringian State Office for the Protection of the Constitution. It uses intelligence resources for its tasks.

== Order ==
The task of the Office for the Protection of the Constitution is to enable the responsible authorities to take the necessary measures in good time to avert threats to the free democratic basic order, the existence and security of the Federation and the states.

== Construction ==
The following organizational units are subordinate to the President as head of the office:

- Staff unit: Controlling
- Section 50: Policy and legal matters, G 10, committee work
- Section 51: Press office, information and public relations
- Section 52: Evaluation, TIAZ
- Section 53: Procurement
- Section 54: Cross-sectional tasks, personnel/material security, counter-espionage. The AfV had around 98 employees in 2017.

Budget of the former Thuringian State Office for the Protection of the Constitution:

== Management of the office ==
On 2 September 1992, Prime Minister Bernhard Vogel ordered that the head of the agency bear the official title “President of the State Office for the Protection of the Constitution”.

Zeitraum	Name	Funktion	Bemerkung
bis 1994	Harm Winkler	Head of Office, President of the State Office for the Protection of the Constitution	
1994–2000	Helmut Roewer	President of the Office for the Protection of the Constitution of Thuringia	Initially suspended and then retired due to, among other things, an embezzlement scandal involving the front company Heron Verlagsgesellschaft.
2000–2012	Thomas Sippel	President of the Office for the Protection of the Constitution of Thuringia	Placed into temporary retirement because of his information policy on the National Socialist underground.
2012–2015	Roger Derichs	Deputy President of the TLfV (until 31 December 2014) Vice President (since 1 January 2015)	From July 2012 to November 2015, the office of President was vacant; the authority was headed by the Vice President on an interim basis.
seit 2015	Stephan J. Kramer	Präsident des AfV	Der ehemalige Generalsekretär des Zentralrats der Juden in Deutschland wurde am 19. November 2015 von Innenminister Holger Poppenhäger als neuer Präsident des AfV vorgestellt. Er trat das Amt am 1. Dezember an.

== Legal basis ==
The legal basis for the work of the AfV is the Thuringian Constitution Protection Act (ThürVerfSchG) of 8 August 2014 (GVBl. 2014, 529).

== Control ==
The work of the departments in the AfV is subject to ongoing monitoring by the Controlling Office, which reports directly to the President. Parliamentary monitoring is carried out by the minister informing the Parliamentary Control Commission of the State Parliament and the so-called G10 Commission. In special cases, the Parliamentary Control Commission can also request direct reporting by the Controlling Office.

== Known informants ==
- Kai-Uwe Trinkaus, was district chairman of the NPD-Erfurt in 2007 and 2008 and has been state chairman of the DVU since the end of 2008. He worked on behalf of the Thuringian State Office for the Protection of the Constitution between May 2006 and September 2007. In 2012, he publicly revealed his identity in conversations with journalists and stated that his undercover agent had given him a list of addresses and names of eleven anti-fascists, which was published on the Erfurt NPD website. The Erfurt public prosecutor's office was unable to clarify how these names had come to the NPD from police investigations. He also stated that he had instructed the neo-Nazi Andy F., who had already been exposed in 2007 and who had spied on the Left Party in the Thuringian state parliament and the state association of the Jusos as an intern, to do this and that he had also discussed this with the State Office for the Protection of the Constitution. However, the TLfV claims not to have known anything about this in advance either.
- Tino Brandt, worked for the Thuringian State Office for the Protection of the Constitution from 1994 to 2001; driving force in the neo-Nazi comradeship network “Thuringian Homeland Protection”; in the NPD since 1999; deputy state chairman of the NPD since April 2000.
- Marcel Degner, treasurer and section leader of Blood and Honour
- Thomas Dienel founded the German National Party (DNP) and was an undercover agent until 2000. In 1992, Federal Minister of the Interior Rudolf Seiters filed an application with the Federal Constitutional Court to deprive him of his fundamental rights under Article 18 of the Basic Law However, the application was rejected by the Federal Constitutional Court. At this point, the Federal Ministry of the Interior was suddenly convinced that it posed no threat to the free and democratic basic order.
- Manfred Reich

In March 2015, the red-red-green state government decided to shut down all undercover agents of the Office for the Protection of the Constitution. However, there are exceptions for specific terrorist threats, which the Prime Minister and the Minister of the Interior can agree on in consultation with the parliamentary control commission of the state parliament; in 2015, there are no longer any informants in the right-wing scene, but there are among Salafists and in the vicinity of the Kurdish PKK.

== Affairs ==
The “Franconian Homeland Protection”, founded in the Coburg area in the mid-1990s, was led by an undercover agent from the Thuringian Office for the Protection of the Constitution.

At the end of the 1990s, the State Office spent considerable money on numerous undercover agents in the right-wing extremist scene (see also the costly but ineffective "Operation Rennsteig"). One of the undercover agents, Tino Brandt, headed the Thuringian Homeland Security, from which three members, Uwe Mundlos, Uwe Böhnhardt and Beate Zschäpe, formed the terrorist organization National Socialist Underground (NSU) in 1998 after a number of planned bomb attacks. The NSU carried out a series of murders against nine migrants between 2000 and 2006. In addition to the execution-style murders, Mundlos and Böhnhardt carried out three bomb attacks, including the nail bomb attack in Cologne, and 15 bank robberies (see NSU crimes). While in hiding, Brandt maintained contact with the NSU trio and in 1998 was commissioned by the State Office to approach the NSU trio in return for special remuneration; Among other things, he received money that he was supposed to give to the NSU trio in exchange for fake passports. During a telephone conversation between Brandt and the NSU in March 1999, the State Office for the Protection of the Constitution failed to listen in on the conversation and inform the State Criminal Police Office. By 2001, the State Office had received a total of 47 source references to the NSU trio, most of which were provided by Brandt, but it cannot be proven whether any of the informants had knowledge of the crimes or even of their whereabouts. In 2018, NSU expert Tanjev Schultz judged that the State Office had made poor use of its many informants in the right-wing scene; things had gone "haywire" in the agency.

The surveillance of the current Thuringian Minister-President Bodo Ramelow by the intelligence services also began under Roewer in the 1990s. The surveillance of the parliamentarian by the state office was later stopped by the Interior Ministry at Ramelow's insistence and was found unconstitutional by the Federal Office for the Protection of the Constitution and the Federal Constitutional Court in October 2013.

In 2000, on behalf of the Thuringian Minister of the Interior, Christian Köckert (CDU), the former Hessian Secretary of State for Justice, Karl Heinz Gasser (CDU), investigated the conduct of the then President of the Office for the Protection of the Constitution, Helmut Roewer. Gasser identified serious errors in the selection, structure and management of personnel, so that he described the reorientation of the state office between 1994 and 1999 as a failure. The hiring of young university graduates as managers led to constant disputes between long-serving secret service agents and their new superiors. For example, an official who criticized a decision made by his boss as absurd was soon required by Roewer to submit an hourly written report on his work. Technical supervision by the Ministry of the Interior was practically eliminated for years, as Roewer insisted on reporting exclusively to Köckert's predecessor, Richard Dewes (SPD), without the responsible supervisory department being informed of the content of the discussions. Dewe's successor Köckert also failed to react to the chaotic situation in Roewer's office despite an urgent letter from the staff council. The report initially remained classified, but Roewer was suspended in the same year due to an embezzlement scandal involving the front company Heron-Verlag. It was only when Roewer returned to public attention in the wake of the NSU affair that the Gasser report reached the media.

The Thuringian NSU investigation committee believes that official sabotage in the exchange of information between the Thuringian Office for the Protection of the Constitution and the State Criminal Police Office is possible. Undercover agents are said to have been warned of impending police searches in the right-wing scene.

In March 2012, several extensive house searches were carried out on former informants of the Thuringian Office for the Protection of the Constitution on the grounds of commercial gang fraud; Brandt is among the accused.
