= Thomas Kemmerich =

German politician (born 1965)

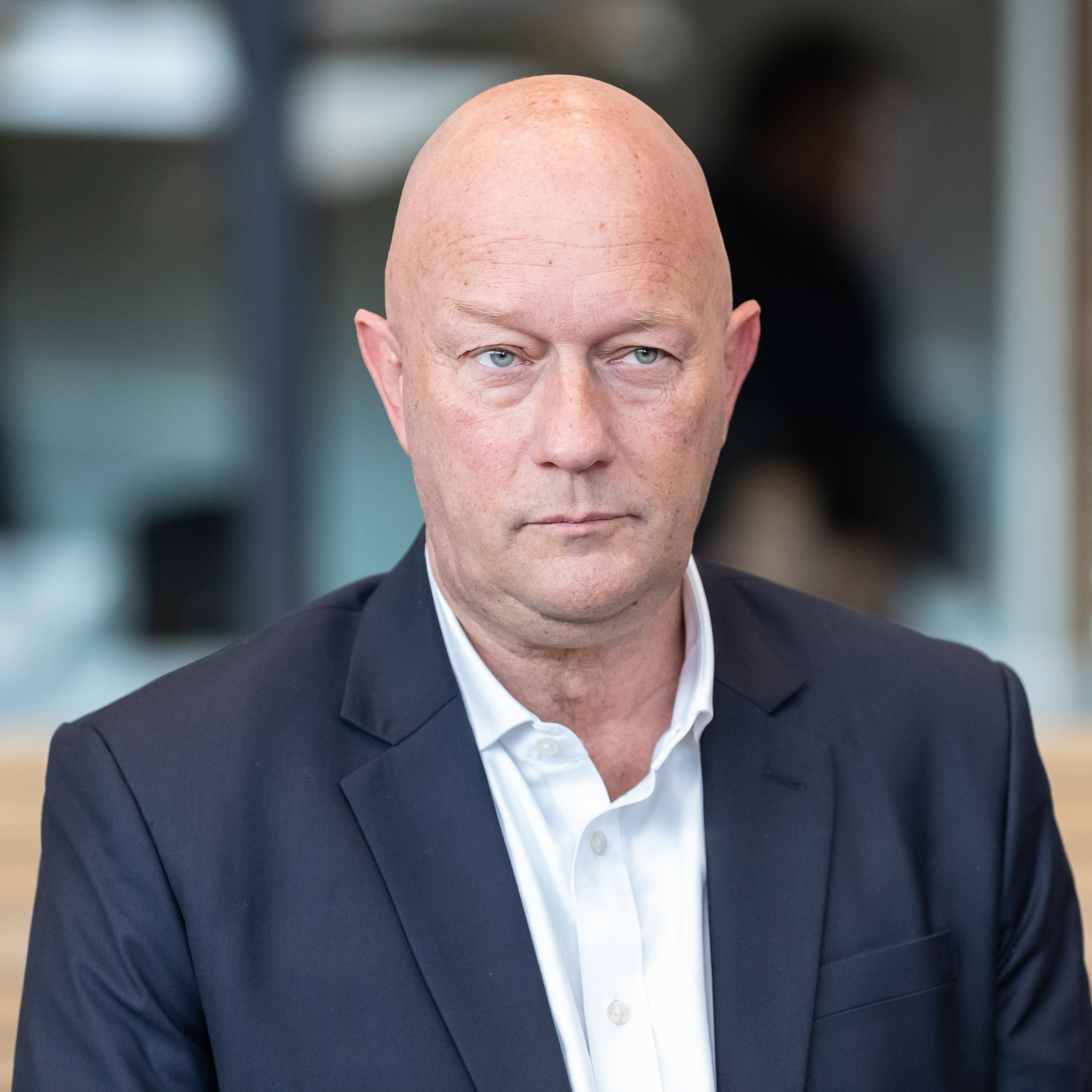

Minister-President of Thuringia
- In office 5 February 2020 – 4 March 2020
- Deputy: vacant
- Preceded by: Bodo Ramelow
- Succeeded by: Bodo Ramelow

Leader of the Free Democratic Party in the Landtag of Thuringia
- In office 26 November 2019 – 1 September 2024
- Chief Whip: Robert-Martin Montag
- Deputy: Dirk Bergner
- Preceded by: Uwe Barth (2014)

Leader of the Free Democratic Party in Thuringia
- Incumbent
- Assumed office 29 November 2015
- General Secretary: Robert-Martin Montag
- Deputy: Dirk Bergner; Thomas Nitzsche; Gerald Ullrich
- Preceded by: Dirk Bergner (acting)
Parliamentary constituencies
Member of the Landtag of Thuringia
In office 26 November 2019 – 1 September 2024
Preceded by	multi-member district
Succeeded by	multi-member district
Constituency	FDP List
In office 30 October 2009 – 14 October 2014
Preceded by	multi-member district
Succeeded by	multi-member district
Constituency	FDP List
Member of the Bundestag for Thuringia
In office 24 October 2017 – 14 November 2019
Preceded by	Patrick Kurth (2013)
Succeeded by	Reginald Hanke
Constituency	FDP List

Personal details
- Born: Thomas Karl Leonard Kemmerich; 20 February 1965 (age 61) Aachen, West Germany
- Party: Free Democratic Party (until 2025)
- Children: 6
- Education: University of Bonn
- Occupation: Politician; Businessman; Lawyer
- Website: Landtag website

Thomas Karl Leonard Kemmerich (born 20 February 1965) is a German politician, formerly of the Free Democratic Party (FDP) who served as the Minister-President of Thuringia from 5 February to 4 March 2020. With a tenure of only 28 days (3 days if his time as acting officeholder is excluded), he has been both the shortest-serving Minister-President of Thuringia and the shortest-serving head of a state government in the Federal Republic of Germany (as of 2024).

After Reinhold Maier, who had served as minister-president of Württemberg-Baden (1945–1952) and, after the state's fusion with two other southwestern states, of the new state Baden-Württemberg (1952–1953), he was the second minister-president from the FDP in German history. In September 2025, Kemmerich left the FDP.

== Life ==
Kemmerich was born in Aachen, West Germany. He is Roman Catholic, married, and father of six children. He completed his law studies at the University of Bonn in 1989. In January 1990, just after the Peaceful Revolution in East Germany, he moved to Erfurt and became the manager of a hairdresser's chain in Thuringia.

=== Political career ===
He served as a member of the Thuringian Landtag (state parliament) from 2009 to 2014. He became the leader of Thuringia's Free Democratic Party in 2015, and was a member of the Bundestag (federal parliament) from 2017 to 2019. He returned to the Landtag after the 2019 state election (where the FDP passed the five-percent threshold by a mere 45 votes) and served as the leader of the FDP parliamentary group consisting of five lawmakers. After the 2024 state election, Kemmerich called for the federal FDP to leave the governing coalition. The party lost all its seats in Thuringia.

=== Election controversy and premiership ===
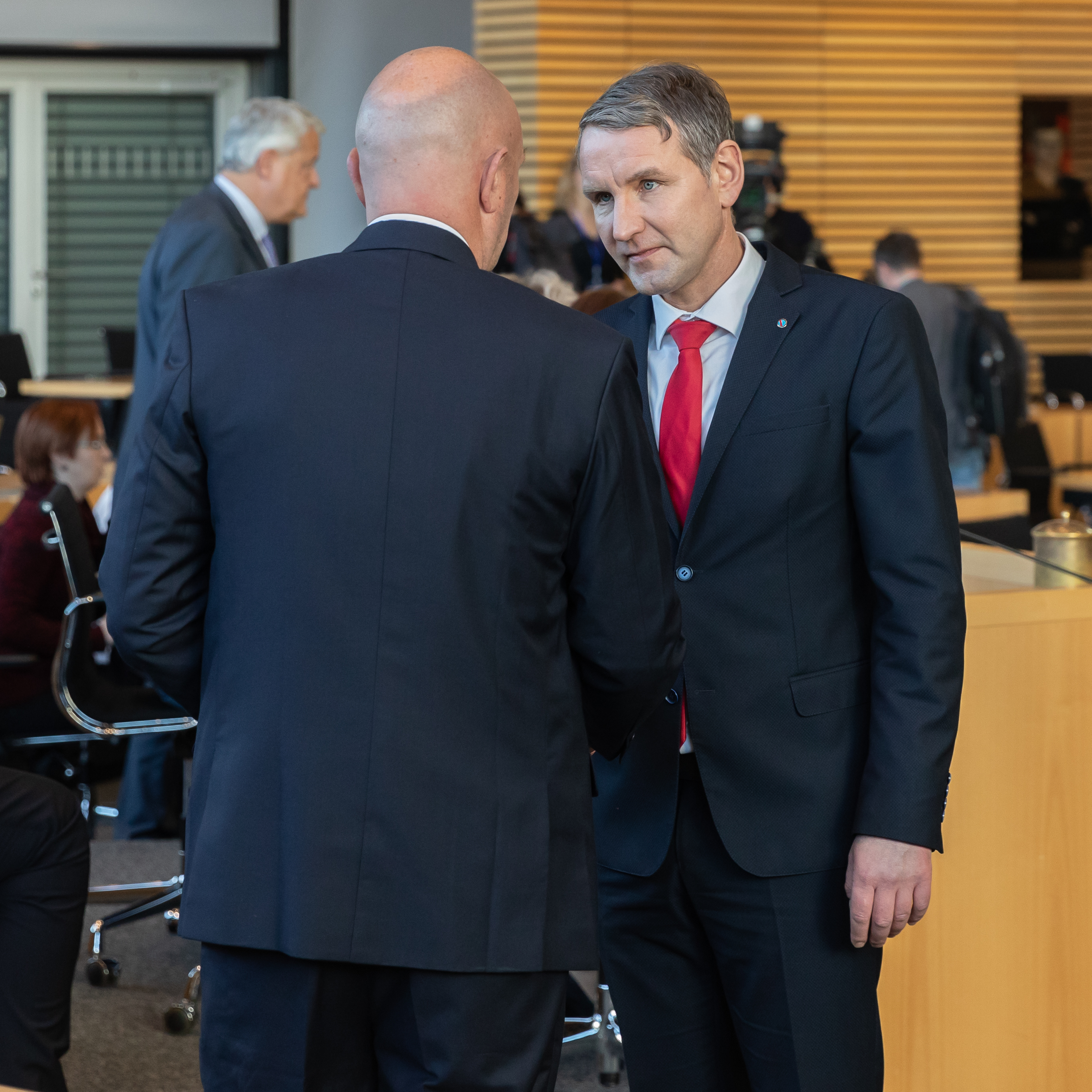
AfD Leader Björn Höcke congratulates Kemmerich on his election.

On 5 February 2020, Kemmerich was elected to the position of minister-president in the third ballot, with the support of his FDP (being the smallest group in the state parliament) as well as lawmakers of the centre-right CDU and the far-right AfD. Incumbent minister-president Bodo Ramelow of The Left had failed to win a majority in the first two ballots. The AfD had nominated its own candidate, but abandoned him in favour of Kemmerich in the third ballot, to the surprise of CDU and FDP deputies. Kemmerich's election with AfD support violated a convention among all mainstream German political parties to refuse any co-operation with the AfD, and attracted immediate fierce criticism throughout Germany and beyond.

On 6 February, one day after his election, Kemmerich delivered a statement, in which he described his position as untenable and announced a motion for the dissolution of the state parliament in order to bring about new elections. Under the provisions of the Thuringia state constitution, in order to dissolve the state parliament, a two-thirds-majority is needed, but the Thuringia AfD and CDU have both ruled out supporting a dissolution-motion. On 7 February, Kemmerich met with Birgit Keller, the President of the Landtag of Thuringia, to discuss possibilities for a swift transfer of power to a new minister-president. Kemmerich announced he would stay in office until the matter is resolved in order to secure political stability for the state.

On 8 February, he resigned his post but stayed in office as acting minister-president until the election of a successor, as mandated by the state constitution. As Kemmerich had not appointed any ministers, he was called a "one-man government". For the time being, the ministries were directed by state secretaries appointed under the Ramelow government. Kemmerich stayed away from the Bundesrat session on 14 February 2020, despite him being the only officeholder allowed to represent Thuringia in the chamber. Thus, the state was unrepresented for the first time since its accession to the Federal Republic in 1990. On 4 March 2020, Kemmerich was succeeded by Bodo Ramelow who was re-elected minister-president by a plurality of votes. The FDP group did not participate in this election.
