= 1999 Thuringian state election =

State election in Thuringia, Germany

1999 Thuringia state election
← 1994	12 September 1999	2004 →

All 88 seats of the Landtag of Thuringia 45 seats needed for a majority
- Turnout: 1,161,181 (59.9%) ▼14.9 pp
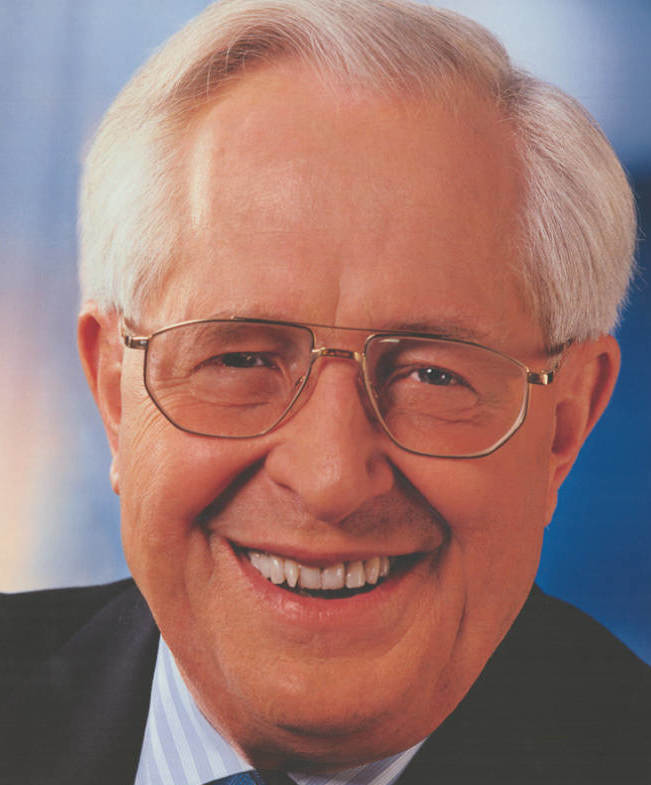

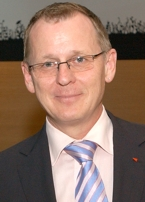
	First party	Second party	Third party
Leader	Bernhard Vogel	Bodo Ramelow	Richard Dewes
Party	CDU	PDS	SPD
Last election	42 seats, 42.6%	17 seats, 16.6%	29 seats, 29.6%
Seats won	49	21	18
Seat change	▲7	▲4	▼11
Popular vote	592,474	247,906	214,801
Percentage	51.0%	21.3%	18.5%
Swing	▲8.4 pp	▲4.7 pp	▼11.1 pp
- Results for the single-member constituencies
Minister-President before election
Bernhard Vogel
CDU
Elected Minister-President
Bernhard Vogel
CDU

The 1999 Thuringian state election was held on 12 September 1999 to elect the members of the 3rd Landtag of Thuringia. The incumbent government was a grand coalition of the Christian Democratic Union (CDU) and Social Democratic Party (SPD) led by Minister-President Bernhard Vogel. The CDU won an absolute majority in the election and formed government alone; Vogel continued as Minister-President.

As of 2024, this is the most recent Thuringian state election, where a party received more than 50% of the vote.

== Parties ==
The table below lists parties represented in the 2nd Landtag of Thuringia.

Name		Ideology	Leader(s)	1994 result	
Name		Ideology	Leader(s)	Votes (%)	Seats
CDU	Christian Democratic Union of Germany; Christlich Demokratische Union Deutschlands	Christian democracy	Bernhard Vogel	42.6%	42 / 88
SPD	Social Democratic Party of Germany; Sozialdemokratische Partei Deutschlands	Social democracy	Richard Dewes	29.6%	29 / 88
PDS	Party of Democratic Socialism; Partei des Demokratischen Sozialismus	Democratic socialism	Bodo Ramelow	16.6%	17 / 88

== Election result ==
Composition of the Landtag

Summary of the 12 September 1999 election results for the Landtag of Thuringia
Party	Votes	%	+/-	Seats	+/-	Seats %
Christian Democratic Union (CDU)	592,474	51.0	▲8.4	49	▲7	55.7
Party of Democratic Socialism (PDS)	247,906	21.3	▲4.7	21	▲4	23.9
Social Democratic Party (SPD)	214,801	18.5	▼11.1	18	▼11	20.5
German People's Union (DVU)	36,386	3.1	▲3.1	0	±0	0
Alliance 90/The Greens (Grüne)	21,617	1.9	▼2.6	0	±0	0
Free Democratic Party (FDP)	13,001	1.1	▼2.1	0	±0	0
Others	34,996	3.0		0	±0	0
Total	1,161,181	100.0		88	±0	
Voter turnout		59.9	▼14.9			

Popular Vote
CDU	51.02%
PDS	21.35%
SPD	18.50%
DVU	3.13%
B'90/GRÜNE	1.86%
FDP	1.12%
Other	3.01%

Landtag seats
CDU	55.68%
PDS	23.86%
SPD	20.45%

== Sources ==
- Landtagswahl 1999 in Thüringen - endgültiges Ergebnis
