= List of minister-presidents of Thuringia =

The office of Minister-President of Thuringia was established at the state's first formation in 1920. On 23 July 1952 the state, then part of the socialist German Democratic Republic (East Germany), was abolished. On 3 October 1990, the state was re-established and joined the Federal Republic of Germany; since then it has been one of the country's sixteen constituent states (Länder).

== State of Thuringia (1920–1945) ==
Minister-President of the State of Thuringia

Political Party: SPD DDP Military DVP Landbund NSDAP

Portrait	Name (Born–Died)	Term of office			Political party
Portrait	Name (Born–Died)	Took office	Left office	Days	Political party
State of the German Reich
1	Arnold Paulssen (1864–1942); First term	11 November 1920	6 October 1921	329	German Democratic Party
2 (1)	August Frölich (1867–1964); Second term	7 October 1921	21 February 1924	867	Social Democratic Party
–	Paul Hasse (1864–1945) as Military Administrator	8 November 1923	24 February 1924	108	Martial law enforced by Reichswehr
3	Richard Leutheußer (1867–1942)	21 February 1924	6 November 1928	1720	German People's Party
4 (2)	Arnold Paulssen (1864–1942); Second term	6 November 1928	22 January 1930	442	German Democratic Party
5	Erwin Baum (1868–1950)	23 January 1930	26 August 1932	946	Landbund
6	Fritz Sauckel (1894–1946)	26 August 1932	8 May 1933	255	National Socialist German Workers' Party
7	Willy Marschler (1893–1952)	8 May 1933	12 April 1945	4357	National Socialist German Workers' Party

== Thuringia (1945–1952) ==
Political Party: SPD SED

Portrait	Name (Born–Died)	Term of office			Political party
Portrait	Name (Born–Died)	Took office	Left office	Days	Political party
Thuringia (1945–1949)
Soviet occupation zone in Allied-occupied Germany
1	Hermann Brill (1895–1959) as District President	7 May 1945	16 July 1945 (removed by the Soviets)	70	Social Democratic Party
2	Rudolf Paul (1893–1978) as State President	16 July 1945	1 September 1947 (fled from the Soviets)	777	Non-partisan (until 1946)
2	Rudolf Paul (1893–1978) as State President	16 July 1945	1 September 1947 (fled from the Soviets)	777	Socialist Unity Party (1946–1947)
3	Werner Eggerath (1900–1977) as Minister-President	2 September 1947	7 October 1949	766	Socialist Unity Party
Thuringia (1949–1952)
State of the German Democratic Republic
(3)	Werner Eggerath (1900–1977) as Minister-President	7 October 1949	23 July 1952	1020	Socialist Unity Party
From 23 July 1952 until 3 October 1990, Thuringia was abolished.

== Free State of Thuringia (1990–present) ==
Minister-President of the Free State of Thuringia

Political Party: CDU The Left FDP

Portrait	Name (Born–Died)	Term of office			Political party
Portrait	Name (Born–Died)	Took office	Left office	Days	Political party
Thuringia (1990–present)
State of the Federal Republic of Germany
1	Josef Duchač (1938–2026)	8 November 1990 (Note: Duchač previously acted before as the state commissioner from 3 October to 8 November 1990.)	5 February 1992 (resigned)	454	Christian Democratic Union
2	Bernhard Vogel (1932–2025)	5 February 1992	5 June 2003 (resigned)	4138	Christian Democratic Union
3	Dieter Althaus (born 1958)	5 June 2003	30 October 2009 (resigned)	2339	Christian Democratic Union
4	Christine Lieberknecht (born 1958)	30 October 2009	5 December 2014	1862	Christian Democratic Union
5	Bodo Ramelow (born 1956); First term	5 December 2014	5 February 2020	1888	The Left
6	Thomas Kemmerich (born 1965)	5 February 2020	4 March 2020 (resigned)	28	Free Democratic Party
7 (5)	Bodo Ramelow (born 1956); Second term	4 March 2020	12 December 2024	1744	The Left
8	Mario Voigt (born 1977)	12 December 2024	Incumbent	683	Christian Democratic Union

== See also ==
- Thuringia
- Landtag of Thuringia
