= 2014 Thuringian state election =

State election in Thuringia, Germany

- 14 September 2014

All 91 seats of the Landtag of Thuringia 46 seats needed for a majority
- Registered: 1,812,370 ▼5.1%
- Turnout: 941,719 (52.7%) ▼3.5 pp
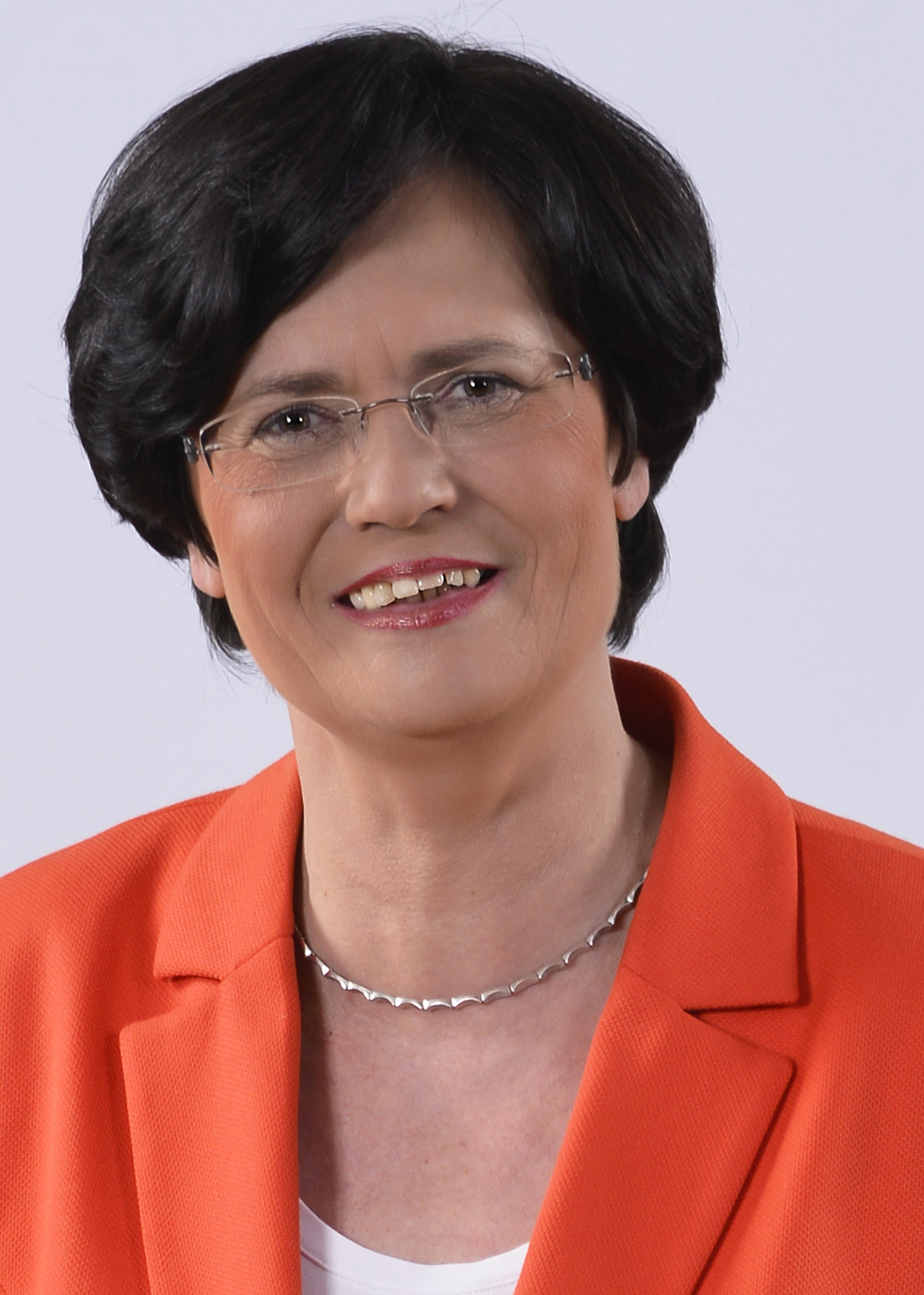

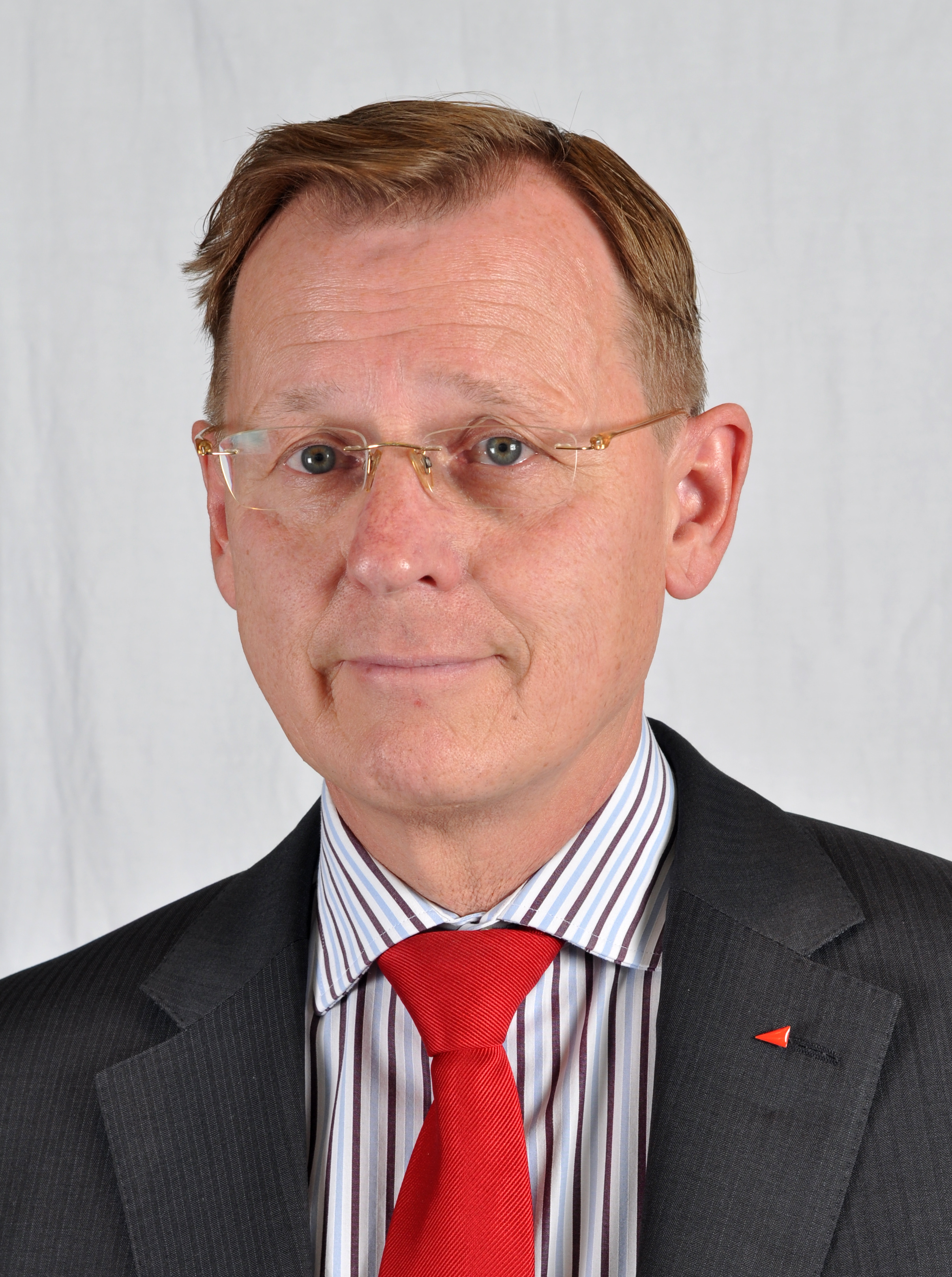

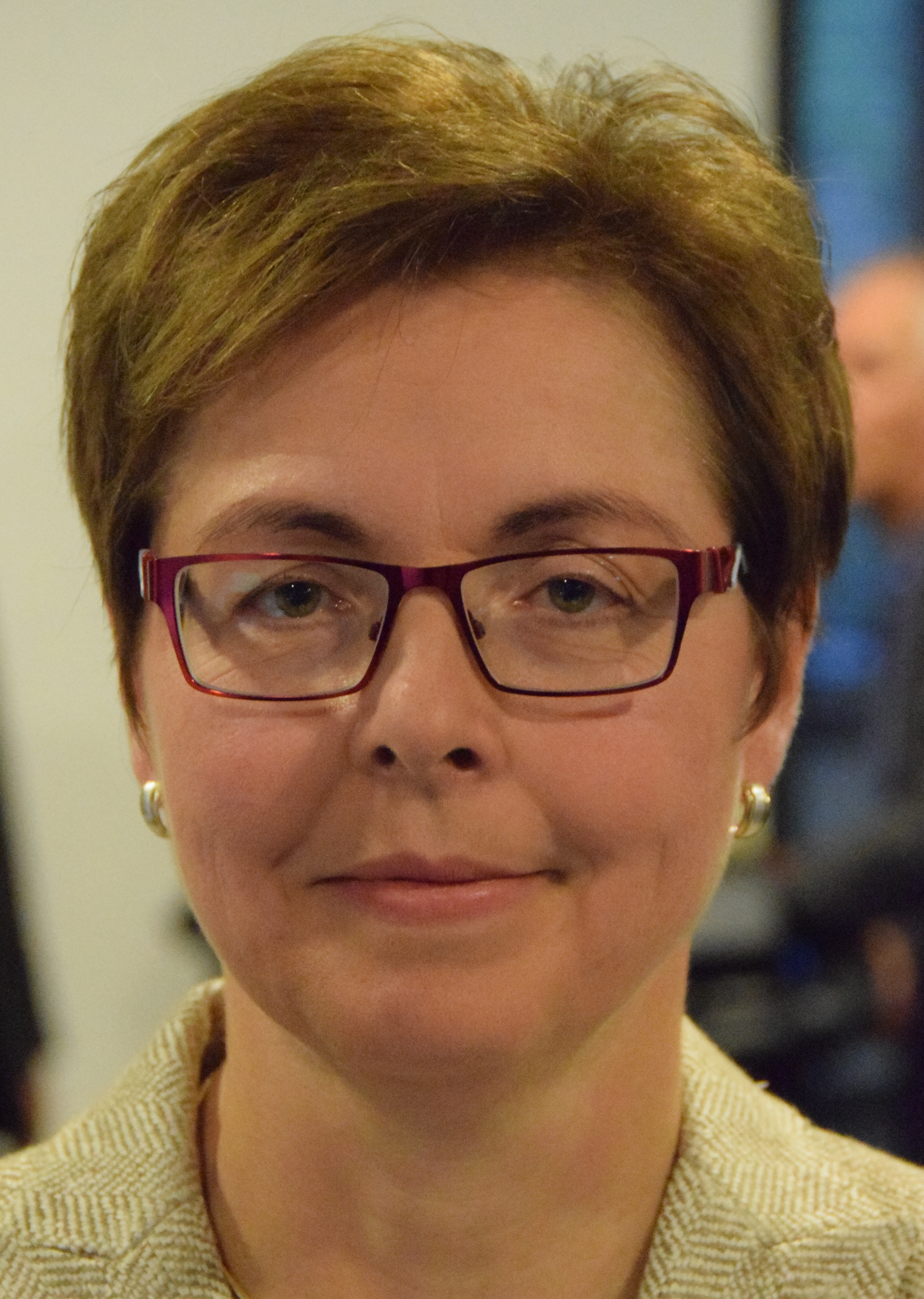

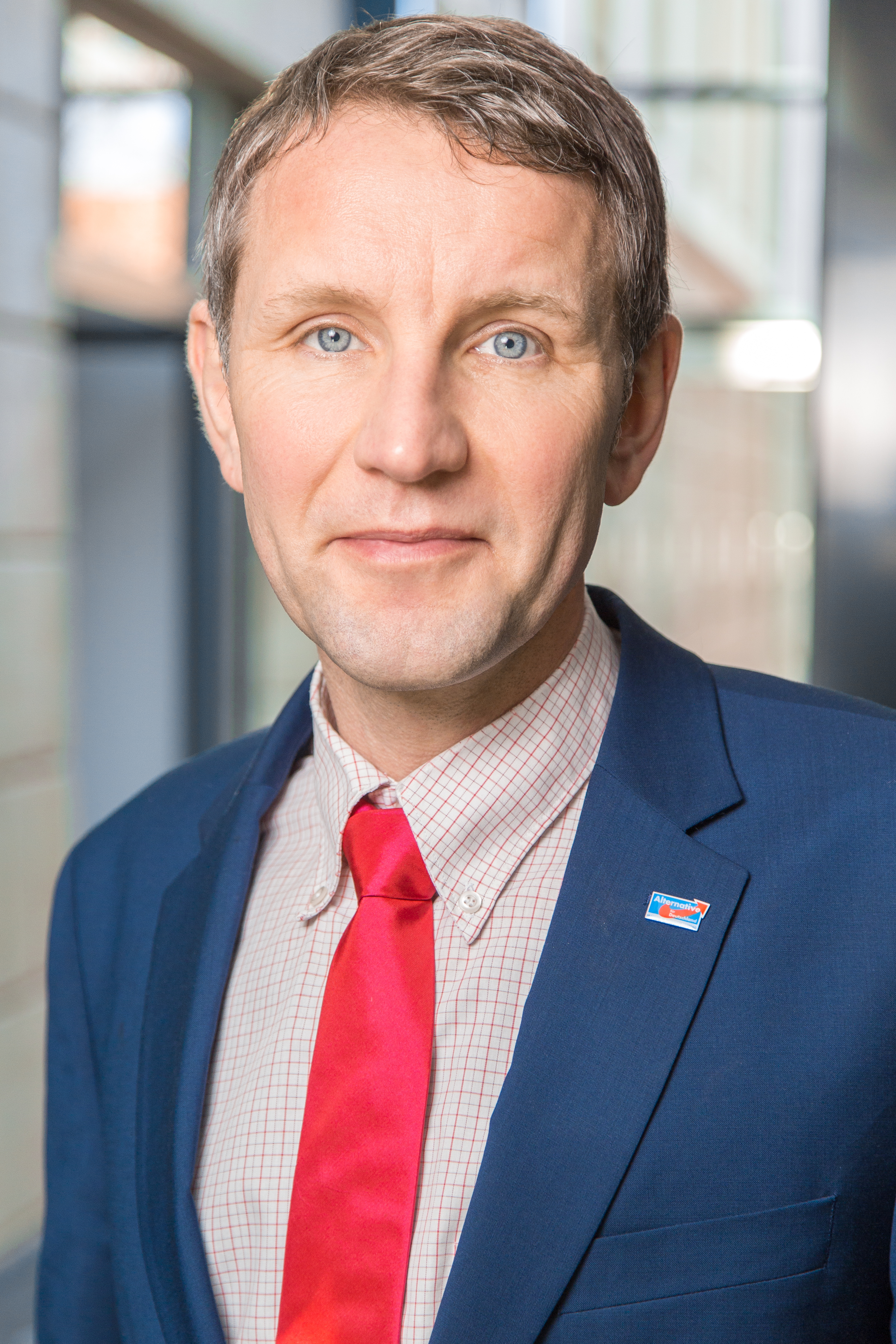

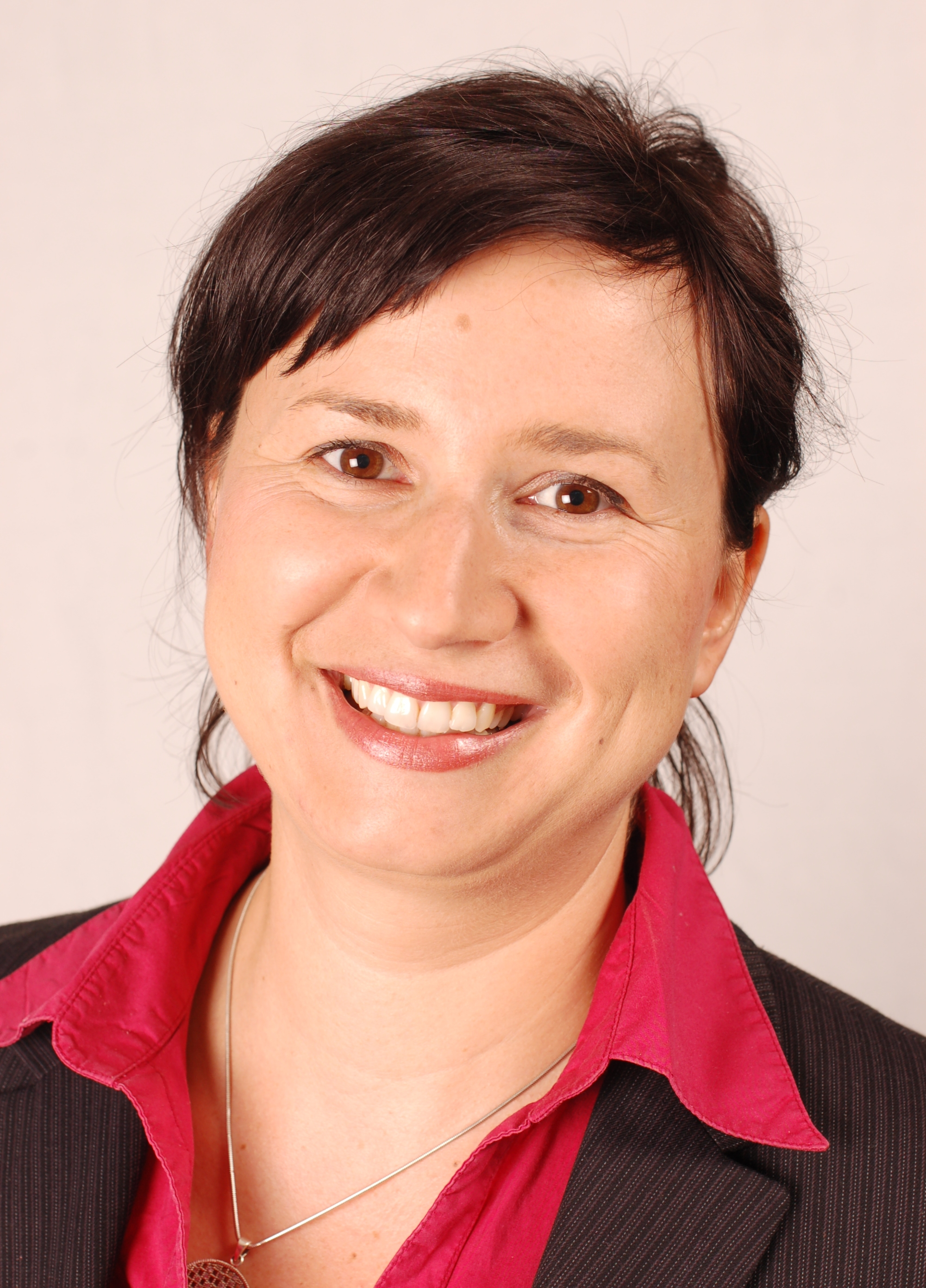

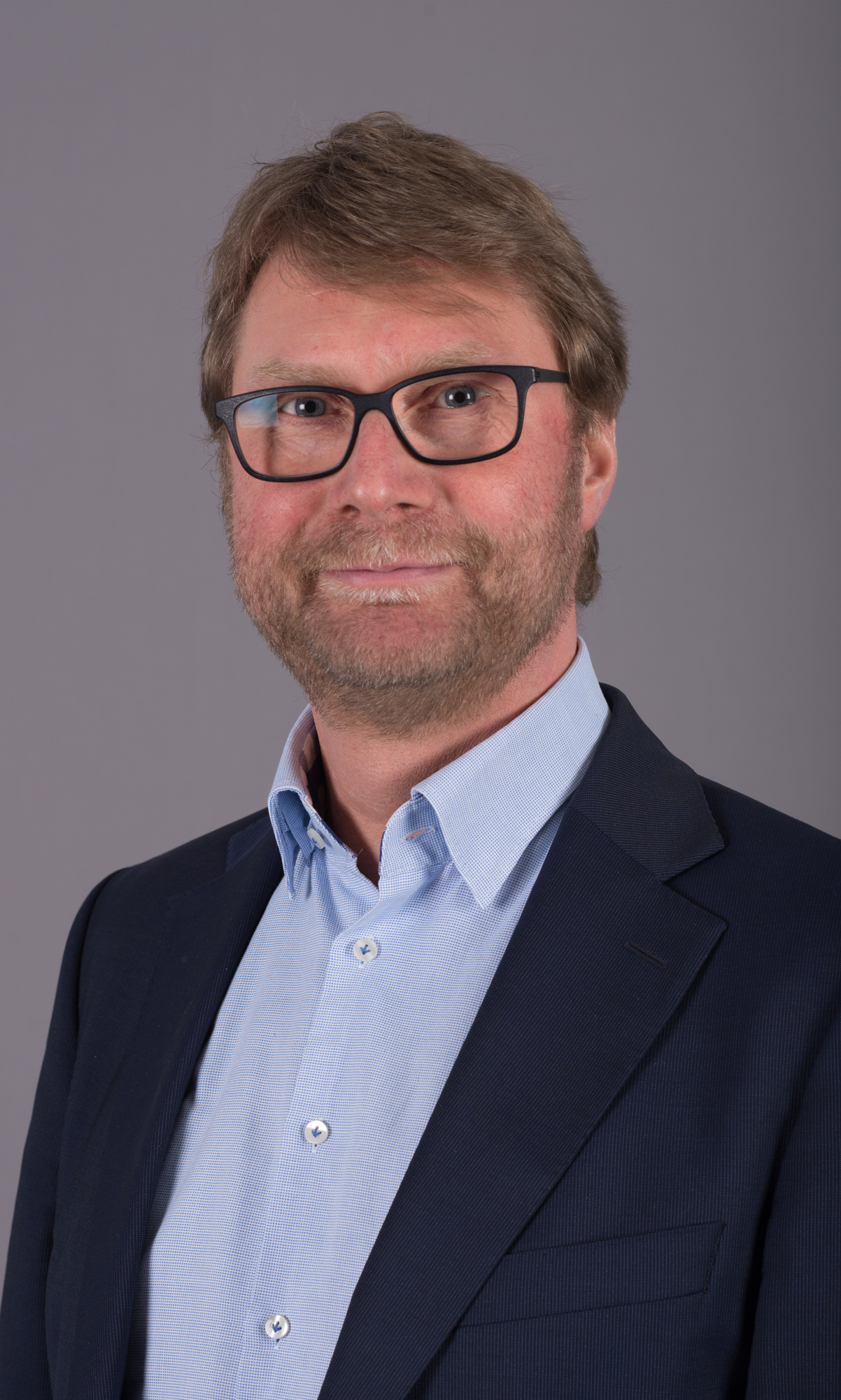
	First party	Second party	Third party
Leader	Christine Lieberknecht	Bodo Ramelow	Heike Taubert
Party	CDU	Left	SPD
Leader's seat	Weimar I – Weimarer Land II	List (Note: Lost re-election in Erfurt III.)	List (Note: Ran in Greiz II (lost).)
Last election	30 seats, 31.2%	27 seats, 27.4%	18 seats, 18.5%
Seats won	34	28	12
Seat change	▲4	▲1	▼6
Popular vote	315,104	265,428	116,889
Percentage	33.5%	28.2%	12.4%
Swing	▲2.3 pp	▲0.8 pp	▼6.1 pp
	Fourth party	Fifth party
Leader	Björn Höcke	Anja Siegesmund & Dirk Adams
Party	AfD	Greens
Leader's seat	List (Note: Ran in Eichsfeld I (lost).)	List (Note: Ran in Jena I (lost).)
Last election	Did not exist	6 seats, 6.2%
Seats won	11	6
Seat change	▲11	0
Popular vote	99,545	53,407
Percentage	10.6%	5.7%
Swing	New party	▼0.5 pp
- Results for the single-member constituencies
Minister-President before election
Christine Lieberknecht
CDU
Elected Minister-President
Bodo Ramelow
Left

The 2014 Thuringian state election was held on 14 September 2014 to elect the members of the 6th Landtag of Thuringia. The government prior to the election was a grand coalition of the Christian Democratic Union (CDU) and Social Democratic Party (SPD) led by Minister-President Christine Lieberknecht. The government narrowly retained its majority. However, the SPD chose not to renew the coalition, instead pursuing an agreement to enter as a junior partner in a coalition with The Left and The Greens. After a vote of the SPD membership showed a majority in favour, the SPD went ahead with the agreement.

On 5 December the red-red-green coalition, led by The Left's Bodo Ramelow, was elected by the Landtag with 46 out of 91 votes. This was the first time in its history that The Left had become the leading party of a governing coalition in Germany. Ramelow became The Left's first ever head of a state government.

== Parties ==
The table below lists parties represented in the 5th Landtag of Thuringia.

Name		Ideology	Leader(s)	2009 result	
Name		Ideology	Leader(s)	Votes (%)	Seats
CDU	Christian Democratic Union of Germany; Christlich Demokratische Union Deutschlands	Christian democracy	Christine Lieberknecht	31.2%	30 / 88
Linke	The Left; Die Linke	Democratic socialism	Bodo Ramelow	27.4%	27 / 88
SPD	Social Democratic Party of Germany; Sozialdemokratische Partei Deutschlands	Social democracy	Heike Taubert	18.5%	18 / 88
FDP	Free Democratic Party; Freie Demokratische Partei	Classical liberalism	Uwe Barth	7.6%	7 / 88
Grüne	Alliance 90/The Greens; Bündnis 90/Die Grünen	Green politics	Anja Siegesmund	6.2%	6 / 88

== Opinion polling ==
Polling firm	Fieldwork date	Sample size	CDU	Linke	SPD	FDP	Grüne	NPD	FW	Piraten	AfD	Others	Lead
2014 state election	14 Sep 2014	–	33.5	28.2	12.4	2.5	5.7	3.6	1.7	1.0	10.6	0.9	5.3
Forschungsgruppe Wahlen	10–11 Sep 2014	949	36.0	26.0	16.0	–	5.5	–	–	–	8.0	8.5	10.0
Infratest dimap	2–4 Sep 2014	1,001	34	28	16	3	5	4	–	–	7	3	6
Forschungsgruppe Wahlen	1–3 Sep 2014	1,002	36	26	16	–	6	–	–	–	8	8	10
INSA	23 Jul–1 Aug 2014	500	34	26	19	4	6	–	–	–	5	6	8
Infratest dimap	9–13 Jul 2014	1,000	36	27	19	2	6	2	–	–	4	4	9
INSA	5 Jun–1 Jul 2014	2,009	33	25	18	3	6	–	2	2	7	4	8
2014 European election	25 May 2014	–	31.8	22.5	18.4	2.1	5.0	3.4	1.8	1.4	7.4	6.2	9.3
Infratest dimap	7–11 May 2014	1,001	36	28	19	2	5	3	–	–	4	3	8
Infratest dimap	6–10 Mar 2014	1,000	38	28	17	2	6	–	–	–	5	4	10
INSA	20 Feb 2014	1,000	35	25	20	3	5	–	2	–	5	5	10
aproxima	17–21 Jan 2014	505	27	28	22	3	11	1	2	2	3	1	1
INSA	19–25 Nov 2013	1,002	35	27	18	2	7	–	–	–	5	6	8
INSA	5–8 Nov 2013	1,000	36	27	14	2	6	–	–	–	6	9	13
Emnid	9–23 Oct 2013	1,000	39	26	17	1	5	2	–	–	7	3	13
2013 federal election	22 Sep 2013	–	38.8	23.4	16.1	2.6	4.9	3.2	1.4	2.4	6.2	0.9	15.4
Infratest dimap	9–15 Aug 2013	1,002	43	20	20	2	7	–	–	–	–	8	23
Infratest dimap	27–30 Jun 2013	1,000	41	21	20	3	8	–	–	3	–	4	20
Infratest dimap	10–15 May 2012	1,000	35	23	24	2	6	–	–	6	–	4	11
IfM Leipzig	3–8 Aug 2011	1,005	33	25	20	4	11	–	–	–	–	7	8
Infratest dimap	28 Apr–2 May 2010	1,000	32	29	21	5	6	–	–	–	–	7	3
2009 federal election	27 Sep 2009	–	31.2	28.8	17.6	9.8	6.0	3.2	–	2.5	–	1.0	2.4
2009 state election	30 Aug 2009	–	31.2	27.4	18.5	7.6	6.2	4.3	3.9	–	–	0.9	3.7

== Results ==
Summary of the 2014 Landtag of Thuringia elections results
Party	Votes	%	+/–	Seats	+/–
Christian Democratic Union	315,096	33.46	▲2.3	34	▲4
The Left	265,425	28.19	▲0.8	28	▲1
Social Democratic Party	116,889	12.41	▼6.1	12	▼6
Alternative for Germany	99,548	10.57	New	11	New
Alliance 90/The Greens	53,395	5.67	▼0.5	6	Steady
National Democratic Party	34,018	3.61	▼0.7	0	Steady
Free Democratic Party	23,352	2.48	▼5.1	0	▼7
Others	33,969	3.61	▼1.3	0	Steady
Total	941,692	100.00	–	91	–
Valid votes	941,692	98.61	▲0.4		
Invalid/blank votes	13,271	1.39	▼0.4		
Total votes	954,963	100.00	–		
Registered voters/turnout	1,812,249	52.69	▼3.5		

Popular Vote
CDU	33.46%
DIE LINKE	28.19%
SPD	12.41%
AfD	10.57%
B'90/GRÜNE	5.67%
NPD	3.61%
FDP	2.48%
FW	1.68%
PIRATEN	1.03%
Other	0.90%

Landtag seats
CDU	37.36%
DIE LINKE	30.77%
SPD	13.19%
AfD	12.09%
B'90/GRÜNE	6.59%

The Left (Die Linke): 28 seats
Social Democratic Party (SPD): 12 seats
Alliance 90/The Greens (Grüne): 6 seats
Christian Democratic Union (CDU): 34 seats
Alternative for Germany (AfD): 11 seats

== Outcome ==
While the incumbent grand coalition narrowly retained its majority, both parties underperformed expectations. This was especially true for the SPD, which recorded a result worse than it had polled at any point during the preceding five-year parliamentary term. For this reason, the SPD leadership decided to leave the coalition and seek other options. The most clear choice was a "red-red-green coalition" with The Left and Greens. Though this arrangement had successfully governed other states in the past, such a government had always been led by the SPD. Due to the dominance of The Left in Thuringia, however, the only viable option would be a government headed by Bodo Ramelow, leader of The Left. This was a highly controversial prospect due to the party's status as the successor of the Socialist Unity Party, the former ruling party of East Germany. Nonetheless, the SPD pursued the option. They resolved to seek approval from their party membership before signing any agreements, however, and held among the party membership for this purpose; 69.9% were in favour. The SPD therefore moved ahead with plans.

On 4 December, Ramelow was elected Minister-President by the Landtag on the second ballot, with a bare majority of 46 votes out of 91. Prior to the vote, thousands assembled outside the Landtag to protest the investiture of the government. Former East German dissidents were among the demonstrators, with some shouting "Stasi out!" and "The Social Democrats have betrayed us".
