= Christine Lieberknecht =

German politician

Christine Lieberknecht Ministerpräsidentin a. D.
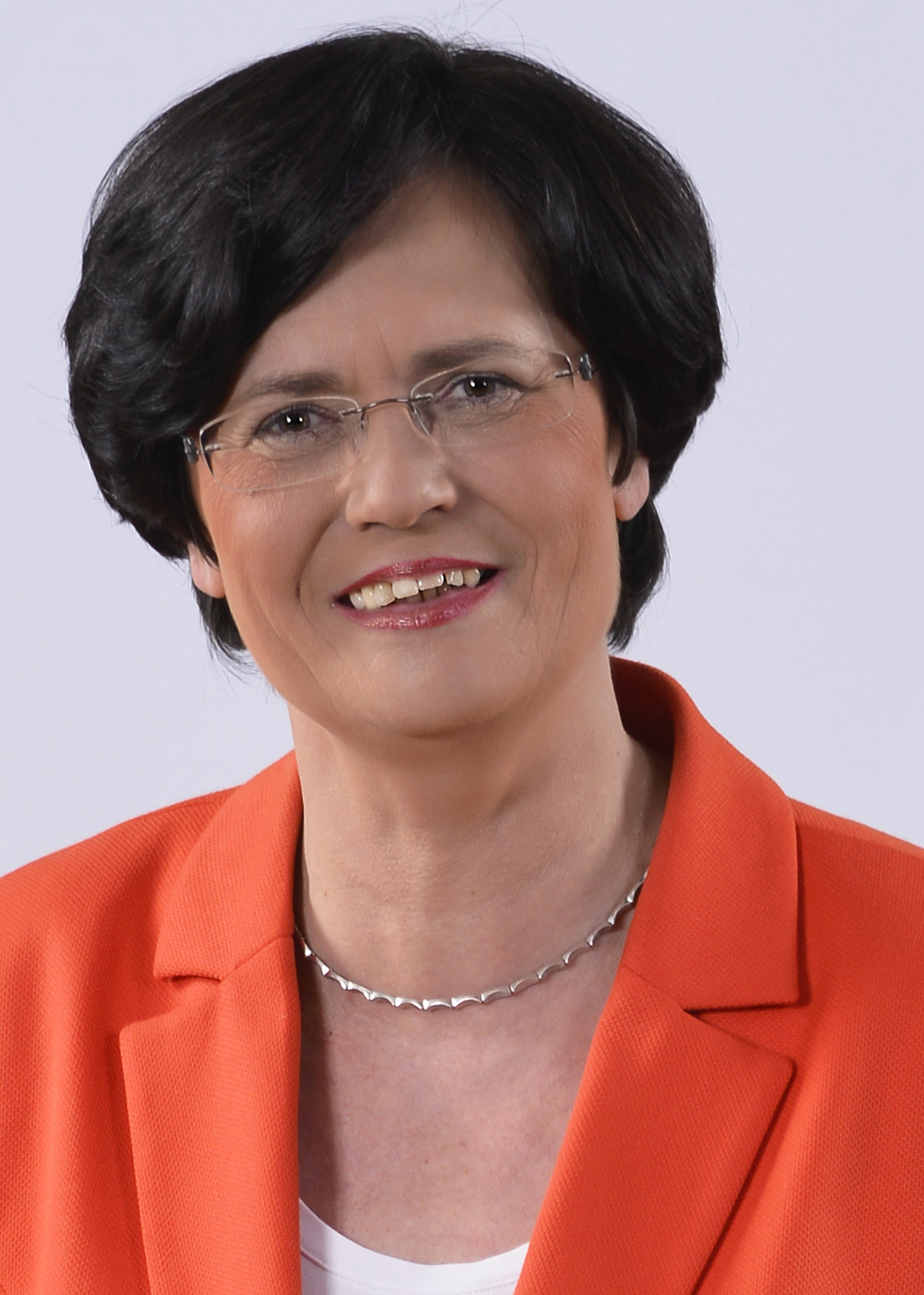

Minister-President of Thuringia
- In office 30 October 2009 – 5 December 2014
- President: Horst Köhler; Christian Wulff; Joachim Gauck
- Chancellor: Angela Merkel
- Preceded by: Dieter Althaus
- Succeeded by: Bodo Ramelow

Member of the Landtag of Thuringia
- In office 16 October 1994 – 27 October 2019
- Preceded by: New seat
- Succeeded by: Thomas Gottweis
- Constituency: Weimar I – Weimarer Land II
- In office 19 March 1991 – 16 October 1994
- Constituency: List

Personal details
- Born: 7 May 1958 (age 67) Weimar, East Germany
- Party: Christian Democratic Union (1990-present)
- Other political affiliations: Christian Democratic Union (East) (1981–1990)
- Spouse: Martin Lieberknecht

Christine Lieberknecht (born Determann 7 May 1958 in Weimar) is a German politician of the Christian Democratic Union (CDU). From 2009 to 2014, she served as the Minister President of Thuringia. Lieberknecht was the first woman to become head of government in Thuringia and only the second woman to govern a German state.

== Family, Education and Work ==
Christine Lieberknecht grew up as the oldest of four siblings. Her father was Protestant-Lutheran pastor. After graduation in 1976 she studied Protestant theology at the Friedrich-Schiller-University Jena:

- 1982 first theological examination
- 1982 Vicariate with the Evangelical Lutheran Church of Thuringia
- 1984 second theological examination
- from 1984 until 1990 Pastor in the Church District of Weimar

== Political career ==
Lieberknecht co-chaired the CDU's national conventions in Düsseldorf (2004), Hanover (2007), Karlsruhe (2010) and in Berlin (2014). After serving as

- Thuringian Minister of Education and Cultural Affairs (1990 to 1992)
- Thuringian Minister for Federal and European Affairs (1992 to 1994)
- Thuringian Minister for Federal Affairs with the State Chancellery (1994 to 1999)
- Speaker of the Thuringian Parliament (1999 to 2004)
- Chairperson of the CDU Faction of the Thuringian Parliament (2004 to 2008)
- Thuringian Minister for Social Affairs, Family and Health (2008 to 2009)

Lieberknecht was the 4th Minister President of the state of Thuringia from 2009 to 2014, and served as chairwoman of the CDU state party in Thuringia from 2009 to 2014.

Lieberknecht has been representing the constituency Weimarer Land II in the Landtag of Thuringia since 1991.

Lieberknecht served as a CDU delegate to the Federal Convention for the purpose of electing the President of Germany in 2012, 2017 and 2022.

In 2019, Lieberknecht was appointed by the Federal Ministry of the Interior, Building and Community to serve on the committee that oversaw the preparations for the 30th anniversary of German reunification.

== Other activities (selection) ==
- Federal Foundation for the Reappraisal of the SED Dictatorship, Member of the Board (since 2016)
- German Children and Youth Foundation (DKJS), Member of the Board of Trustees (since 2010)
- Deutsches Museum, Member of the Board of Trustees (since 2009)
- Evangelical Church in Germany (EKD), Member of the Committee on the Social Order
- Evangelical Working Group of the CDU/CSU, Deputy Chairwoman (since 1991)
- Konrad Adenauer Foundation (KAS), Member
