= 2004 Thuringian state election =

State election in Thuringia, Germany

2004 Thuringia state election
- 13 June 2004

All 88 seats of the Landtag of Thuringia 45 seats needed for a majority
- Registered: 1,958,401 ▼0.4%
- Turnout: 1,010,578 (53.8%) ▼6.1 pp
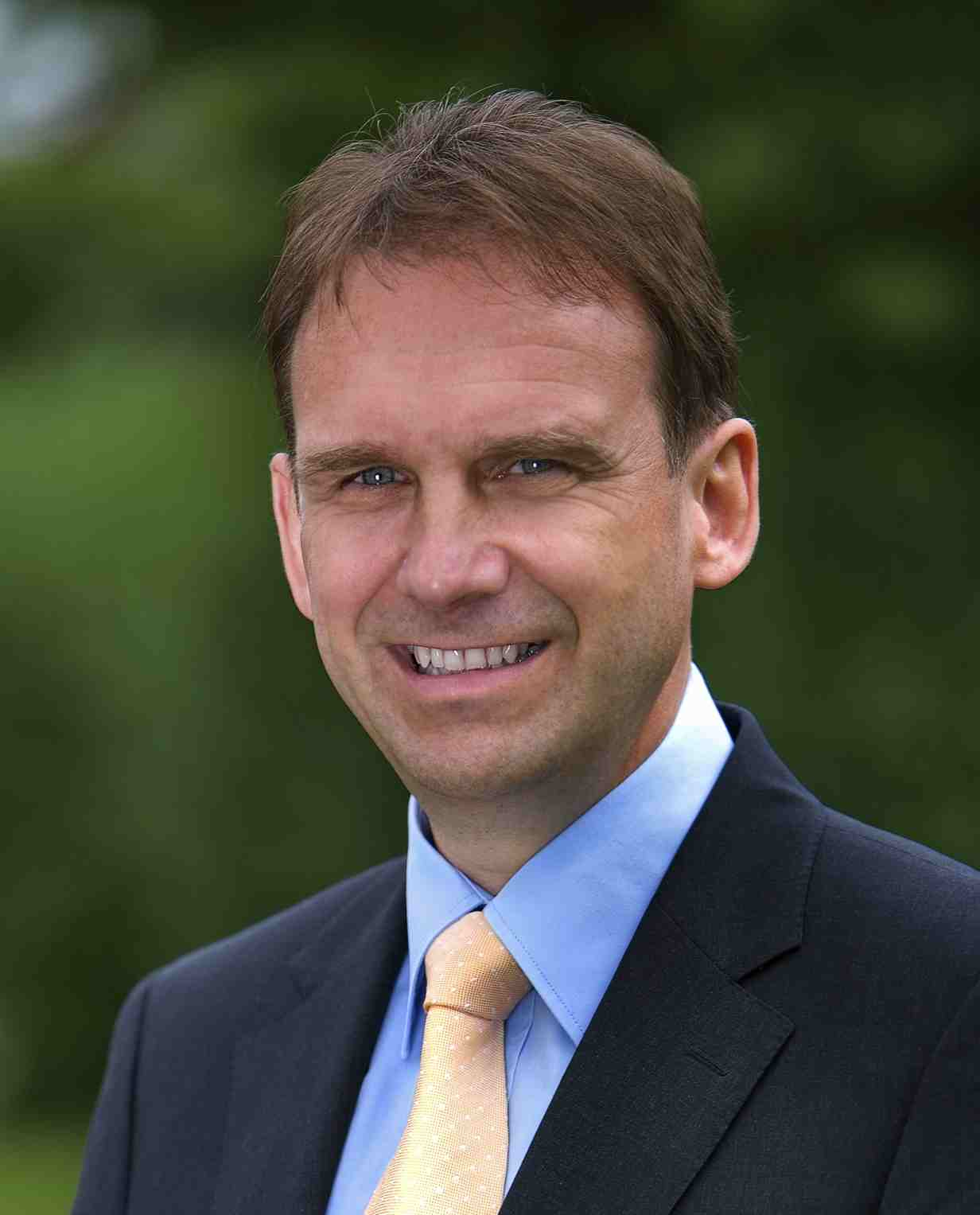

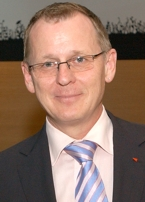

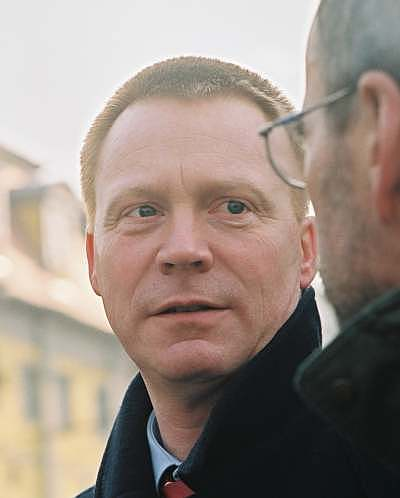
	First party	Second party	Third party
Leader	Dieter Althaus	Bodo Ramelow	Christoph Matschie
Party	CDU	PDS	SPD
Last election	49 seats, 51.0%	21 seats, 21.3%	18 seats, 18.5%
Seats won	45	28	15
Seat change	▼4	▲7	▼3
Popular vote	434,088	263,717	146,297
Percentage	43.0%	26.1%	14.5%
Swing	▼8.0 pp	▲4.8 pp	▼4.0 pp
- Results for the single-member constituencies
Minister-President before election
Dieter Althaus
CDU
Elected Minister-President
Dieter Althaus
CDU

The 2004 Thuringian state election was held on 13 June 2004 to elect the members of the 4th Landtag of Thuringia. The incumbent Christian Democratic Union (CDU) government led by Minister-President Dieter Althaus retained its majority and continued in office.

== Parties ==
The table below lists parties represented in the 3rd Landtag of Thuringia.

Name		Ideology	Leader(s)	1999 result	
Name		Ideology	Leader(s)	Votes (%)	Seats
CDU	Christian Democratic Union of Germany; Christlich Demokratische Union Deutschlands	Christian democracy	Dieter Althaus	51.0%	49 / 88
PDS	Party of Democratic Socialism; Partei des Demokratischen Sozialismus	Democratic socialism	Bodo Ramelow	21.3%	21 / 88
SPD	Social Democratic Party of Germany; Sozialdemokratische Partei Deutschlands	Social democracy	Christoph Matschie	18.5%	18 / 88

== Opinion polling ==
Date	Polling Firm	CDU	PDS	SPD	Grüne	FDP	Others	Lead
13 Jun 2004	2004 state election	43.0	26.1	14.5	4.5	3.6	8.3	16.9
3 Jun	IfM	49.0	21.0	20.0	4.0	3.0	3.0	28.0
1-3 Jun	FGW	44.0	21.0	22.0	5.0	5.0	3.0	22.0
29 May-3 Jun	Infratest dimap	45.0	22.0	20.0	4.5	4.0	4.5	23.0
25–29 May	aproxima	42.0	21.0	24.0	7.0	3.0	3.0	18.0
25–29 May	Infratest dimap	45.0	21.0	21.0	4.0	4.0	5.0	24.0
26–28 May	Forsa	43.0	23.0	20.0	6.0	3.0	5.0	20.0
30 Apr	aproxima	45.0	20.0	23.0	7.0	3.0	2.0	22.0
18-23 Mar	Infratest dimap	48.0	20.0	21.0	4.0	3.0	4.0	27.0
17-23 Mar	aproxima	45.0	21.0	24.0	7.0	3.0	0.0	21.0
9 Mar	aproxima	42.0	22.0	23.0	7.0	6.0	0.0	19.0
28 Feb	IfM	50.0	18.0	19.0	7.0	4.0	2.0	31.0
2004
6 Dec	apropro!	43.0	22.0	24.0	6.0	5.0	0.0	19.0
8 Nov	apropro!	45.0	19.0	23.0	8.0	4.0	1.0	22.0
16 Oct	IfM	55.0	15.0	22.0	3.0	3.0	2.0	33.0
18 Jul	IfM	45.0	15.0	28.0	5.0	4.0	3.0	17.0
5 Jul	apropro!	38.0	18.0	31.0	8.0	4.0	1.0	7.0
20 Jun	Projekt Contor	45.0	17.0	25.0	7.0	5.0	1.0	20.0
8 Apr	IfM	41.0	16.0	31.0	5.0	4.0	3.0	10.0
8 Mar	apropro!	41.0	19.0	26.0	7.0	6.0	1.0	15.0
24 Jan	IfM	48.0	15.0	26.0	5.0	4.0	3.0	22.0
2003
22 Oct	IfM	39.0	11.5	41.0	4.5	2.0	2.0	2.0
22 Sep 2002	2002 federal election	29.4	17.0	39.9	4.3	5.9	3.6	10.5
9 Jul	IfM	43.0	19.0	29.0	2.0	6.0	1.0	14.0
22 Apr	apropro!	42.0	20.0	27.0	3.0	6.0	2.0	15.0
20 Apr	IfM	42.0	20.0	27.0	3.0	6.0	2.0	15.0
2002
21 Dec	IfM	41.0	21.0	30.0	2.0	4.0	2.0	11.0
3 Nov	apropro!	34.0	27.0	30.0	2.0	6.0	1.0	4.0
27 Oct	IfM	39.0	21.0	32.0	3.0	2.0	3.0	7.0
10 Jul	IfM	46.0	23.0	23.0	2.0	1.0	5.0	23.0
2001
2000
12 Sep 1999	1999 state election	51.0	21.3	18.5	1.9	1.1	6.1	29.7

== Election result ==
Summary of the 13 June 2004 election results for the Landtag of Thuringia
Party	Votes	%	+/–	Seats	+/–
Christian Democratic Union (CDU)	434,088	42.95	▼8.0	45	▼4
Party of Democratic Socialism (PDS)	263,717	26.10	▲4.8	28	▲7
Social Democratic Party (SPD)	146,297	14.48	▼4.0	15	▼3
Alliance '90/The Greens (Grüne)	45,649	4.52	▲2.6	0	Steady
Free Democratic Party (FDP)	36,483	3.61	▲2.5	0	Steady
Free Voters (FW)	26,302	2.60	▲2.6	0	Steady
The Republicans (REP)	19,797	1.96	▲1.2	0	Steady
National Democratic Party (NPD)	15,695	1.55	▲1.4	0	Steady
Others	22,550	2.23		0	Steady
Total	1,010,578	100.00	–	88	–

Popular Vote
CDU	42.95%
PDS	26.10%
SPD	14.48%
B'90/GRÜNE	4.52%
FDP	3.61%
FW	2.60%
REP	1.96%
NPD	1.55%
Other	2.23%

Landtag seats
CDU	51.14%
PDS	31.82%
SPD	17.05%

== Sources ==
- The Federal Returning Officer
