= Bernhard Stengele =

German director, actor, and politician

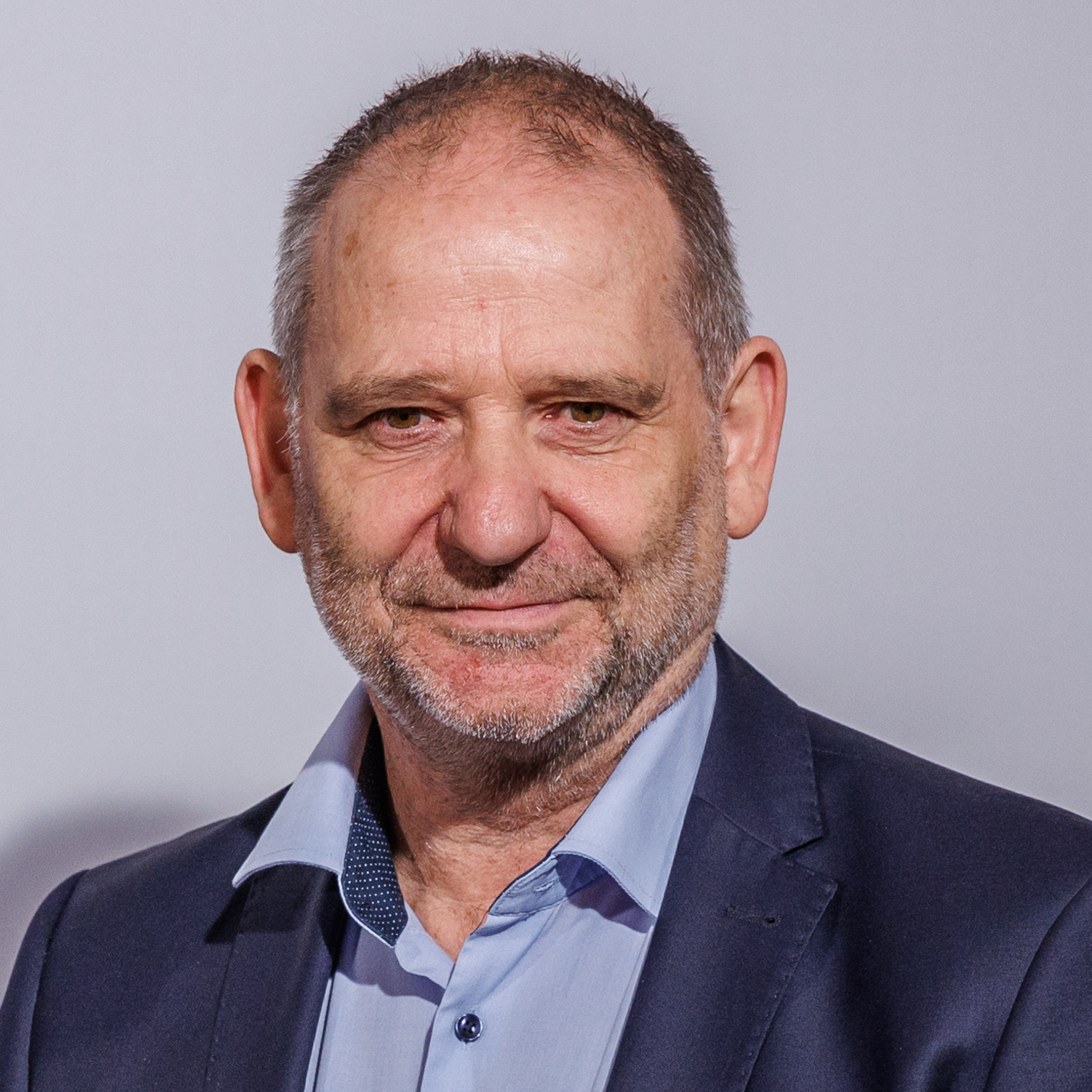
- Bernhard Stengele in 2024

Second Deputy Minister-President of Thuringia
- Incumbent
- Assumed office 1 February 2023
- Preceded by: Anja Siegesmund

Minister for the Environment, Energy and Nature Conservation of Thuringia
- Incumbent
- Assumed office 1 February 2023
- Preceded by: Anja Siegesmund

Spokesman for Alliance 90/The Greens in Thuringia
- In office 25 January 2020 – 4 March 2023 Serving with Ann-Sophie Bohm-Eisenbrandt
- Succeeded by: Max Reschke

Personal details
- Born: Bernhard Stengele; 23 April 1963 (age 62) Wangen im Allgäu, Baden-Württemberg, West Germany
- Party: Alliance 90/The Greens
- Profession: Actor, director

Bernhard Stengele (born 23 April 1963) is a German director, actor, and politician of Alliance 90/The Greens, who has been serving as Second Deputy Minister-President and Minister for the Environment, Energy and Nature Conservation in the Thuringia state government since February 2023. Between January 2020 and March 2023, he served as co-spokesperson of the party in Thuringia.

== Early life ==
Stengele was born in Wangen im Allgäu, Baden-Württemberg on 23 April 1963, as the third of five children.

== Theatre career ==
Stengele completed his acting training at the Ecole Monika Pagneux et Philipp Gaullier in Paris. After guest engagements at the Teatro itinerante del sol (Düsseldorf/Bogotá), at the Dance Theater Skoronel (Berlin), the Theaterwerkstatt Hannover and at the Deutsches Schauspielhaus (Hamburg), he became a permanent member of the ensemble at the Stadttheater Konstanz in 1992. In 1996 he moved to the Saarland State Theater in Saarbrücken, where he also started directing. In 2001, director Dagmar Schlingmann brought him back to the Stadttheater Konstanz as an actor and director. From 2004 to 2012 he was acting director at the Mainfranken Theater Würzburg. From 2012 to 2017 he worked in the same function at the Theater & Philharmonie Thuringia in Altenburg and Gera. Stengele has worked on co-productions with theatres in Burkina Faso, Greece, Turkey, and Israel. In 2017, he took on the management of the Summer Theater in Überlingen.

== Political career ==
Stengele ran as candidate for Alliance 90/The Greens in Altenburger Land II in the 2019 Thuringian state election, receiving 5.6% of votes cast, and was not elected. On 25 January 2020, he was elected co-leader of the Thuringian branch of the party, alongside Ann-Sophie Bohm-Eisenbrandt.

On 1 Februar 2023 Stengele succeeded Anja Siegesmund (who resigned for personal reasons) as Thuringia's Minister for the Environment, and also became the second Deputy Minister President in the coalition administration of Bodo Ramelow.
