= Altenburger Land II =

Electoral constituency in Thuringia, Germany

Altenburger Land II is an electoral constituency (German: Wahlkreis) represented in the Landtag of Thuringia. It elects one member via first-past-the-post voting, and other candidates might get elected via their party list.

Designated as constituency 44, it covers the eastern part of Altenburger Land. Altenburger Land II was created for the 1994 state election. Originally named Altenburg II, it was renamed after the 1994 election.

== Geography ==
As of the 2019 state election, Altenburger Land II covers the eastern part of Altenburger Land, specifically the municipalities of Altenburg, Fockendorf, Gerstenberg, Göpfersdorf, Haselbach, Langenleuba-Niederhain, Nobitz, Treben, and Windischleuba.

== Members ==
The constituency has been held by the Christian Democratic Union (CDU) since its creation in 1994. Its first representative was Andreas Sonntag, who served two terms from 1994 to 2004, followed by Christian Gumprecht (2004–2014) and Christoph Zippel (2014–2024).

Election	Member	Party	%
1994	Andreas Sonntag	CDU	40.4
1999	Andreas Sonntag	CDU	46.5
2004	Christian Gumprecht	CDU	43.2
2009	Christian Gumprecht	CDU	31.3
2014	Christoph Zippel	CDU	40.2
2019	Christoph Zippel	CDU	37.0
2024	Torben Braga	AfD	42.8

== Election results ==
=== 2024 election ===
State election (2024): Altenburger Land II
Notes:	Blue background denotes the winner of the electorate vote. Pink background denotes a candidate elected from their party list. Yellow background denotes an electorate win by a list member, or other incumbent. A ✓ or ✗ denotes status of any incumbent, win or lose respectively.						
Party	Candidate	Votes	%	±%	Party votes	%	±%
AfD	Torben Braga	10,327	42.8		9,392	38.4	▲10.6
CDU	✗ Christoph Zippel	8,560	35.4	▼1.6	6,036	24.7	▲2.0
BSW					3,801	15.6	
Left	Ral Plötner	3,138	13.0	▼15.3	2,645	10.8	▼19.8
SPD	Norman Müller	1,530	6.3	▼4.6	1,150	4.7	▼2.0
Greens					362	1.5	▼1.9
APT					230	0.9	▼0.2
FDP	Marco Thiele	600	2.5	▼10.5	200	0.8	▼2.9
BD					159	0.7	
FW					145	0.6	
Familie					110	0.5	
Values					75	0.3	
Pirates					58	0.2	▼0.1
ÖDP					50	0.2	▼0.1
MLPD					26	0.1	▼0.1
Informal votes		460			176		
Total valid votes		24,155			24,439		
Turnout		24,615	67.9	▲11.3			
AfD gain from CDU	Majority	1,767	7.4				

=== 2019 election ===
State election (2019): Altenburger Land II
Notes:	Blue background denotes the winner of the electorate vote. Pink background denotes a candidate elected from their party list. Yellow background denotes an electorate win by a list member, or other incumbent. A ✓ or ✗ denotes status of any incumbent, win or lose respectively.						
Party	Candidate	Votes	%	±%	Party votes	%	±%
CDU	✓ Christoph Zippel	7,445	37.0	▼3.2	4,879	22.7	▼13.8
Left	Ralf Plötner	5,709	28.3	▼6.4	6,569	30.6	▼0.6
AfD					5,977	27.8	▲17.9
FDP	Marco Thiele	2,627	13.0		801	3.7	▲2.4
SPD	Norman Müller	2,204	10.9	▼1.7	1,445	6.7	▼4.6
Greens	Bernhard Stengele	1,134	5.6	▲2.7	735	3.4	0.0
Menschliche Welt	Ursula Krause	1,026	5.1				
List-only parties					1,089	5.1	
Informal votes		1,727			377		
Total valid votes		20,145			21,495		
Turnout		21,872	56.6	▲11.8			
CDU hold	Majority	1,736	8.7	▲3.2			

=== 2014 election ===
State election (2014): Altenburger Land II
Notes:	Blue background denotes the winner of the electorate vote. Pink background denotes a candidate elected from their party list. Yellow background denotes an electorate win by a list member, or other incumbent. A ✓ or ✗ denotes status of any incumbent, win or lose respectively.						
Party	Candidate	Votes	%	±%	Party votes	%	±%
CDU	Christoph Zippel	6,908	40.2	▲8.9	6,322	36.5	▲3.0
Left	Birgit Klaubert	5,963	34.7	▲6.5	5,404	31.2	▲4.2
SPD	Norman Müller	2,162	12.6	▼13.6	1,965	11.3	▼9.1
AfD					1,719	9.9	
Free Voters	Klaus-Peter Liefländer	837	4.9		221	1.3	▼0.4
NPD	Robert Schmidt	833	4.8	▼0.1	639	3.7	▼1.1
Greens	Pascal Mauf	498	2.9		589	3.4	▼0.7
List-only parties					455	2.6	
Informal votes		342			229		
Total valid votes		17,201			17,314		
Turnout		17,543	44.8	▼3.7			
CDU hold	Majority	945	5.5	▲2.4			

=== 2009 election ===
State election (2009): Altenburger Land II
Notes:	Blue background denotes the winner of the electorate vote. Pink background denotes a candidate elected from their party list. Yellow background denotes an electorate win by a list member, or other incumbent. A ✓ or ✗ denotes status of any incumbent, win or lose respectively.						
Party	Candidate	Votes	%	±%	Party votes	%	±%
CDU	✓ Christian Gumprecht	6,188	31.3	▼11.9	6,648	33.5	▼8.7
Left	Birgit Klaubert	5,573	28.2	▼4.0	5,368	27.0	▼1.2
SPD	Hartmut Schubert	5,190	26.2	▲10.1	4,047	20.4	▲5.3
FDP	Daniel Scheidel	1,848	9.3	▲3.6	1,556	7.8	▲3.8
NPD	Peter Pichl	979	4.9		955	4.8	▲2.9
Greens					807	4.1	▲1.3
List-only parties					479	2.4	
Informal votes		551			469		
Total valid votes		19,778			19,860		
Turnout		20,329	48.5	▲1.7			
CDU hold	Majority	615	3.1	▼7.9			

=== 2004 election ===
State election (2004): Altenburger Land II
Notes:	Blue background denotes the winner of the electorate vote. Pink background denotes a candidate elected from their party list. Yellow background denotes an electorate win by a list member, or other incumbent. A ✓ or ✗ denotes status of any incumbent, win or lose respectively.						
Party	Candidate	Votes	%	±%	Party votes	%	±%
CDU	Christian Gumprecht	8,585	43.2	▼3.3	8,304	42.2	▼5.1
PDS	Birgit Klaubert	6,391	32.2	▲0.4	5,558	28.2	▲1.2
SPD	Gabriele Matzulla	3,201	16.1	▼2.6	2,963	15.1	▼1.2
FDP	Martin Klimek	1,122	5.7	▲2.7	786	4.0	▲3.0
Greens	Frank Augsten	553	2.8		545	2.8	▲1.1
List-only parties					1,525	7.7	
Informal votes		930			1,101		
Total valid votes		19,852			19,681		
Turnout		20,782	46.8	▼3.4			
CDU hold	Majority	2,194	11.0	▼3.7			

=== 1999 election ===
State election (1999): Altenburger Land II
Notes:	Blue background denotes the winner of the electorate vote. Pink background denotes a candidate elected from their party list. Yellow background denotes an electorate win by a list member, or other incumbent. A ✓ or ✗ denotes status of any incumbent, win or lose respectively.						
Party	Candidate	Votes	%	±%	Party votes	%	±%
CDU	✓ Andreas Sonntag	10,574	46.5	▲6.1	10,882	47.3	▲5.5
PDS	Birgit Klaubert	7,235	31.8	▲14.5	6,196	27.0	▲9.6
SPD	Volker Schemmel	4,246	18.7	▼14.2	3,748	16.3	▼13.8
FDP	Hans-Peter Bugar	688	3.0	▼1.1	231	1.0	▼1.7
List-only parties					1,927	8.4	
Informal votes		609			368		
Total valid votes		22,743			22,984		
Turnout		23,352	50.2	▼19.8			
CDU hold	Majority	3,339	14.7	▲7.2			

=== 1994 election ===
State election (1994): Altenburg II
Notes:	Blue background denotes the winner of the electorate vote. Pink background denotes a candidate elected from their party list. Yellow background denotes an electorate win by a list member, or other incumbent. A ✓ or ✗ denotes status of any incumbent, win or lose respectively.						
Party	Candidate	Votes	%	±%	Party votes	%	±%
CDU	Andreas Sonntag	13,054	40.4		13,449	41.9	
SPD		10,622	32.9		9,649	30.0	
PDS		5,555	17.2		5,594	17.4	
Greens		1,730	5.4		1,458	4.5	
FDP		1,321	4.1		867	2.7	
List-only parties					1,097	3.4	
Informal votes		1,626			1,794		
Total valid votes		32,282			32,114		
Turnout		33,908	70.1				
CDU win new seat	Majority	2,432	7.5				
