= Ann-Sophie Bohm-Eisenbrandt =

German politician

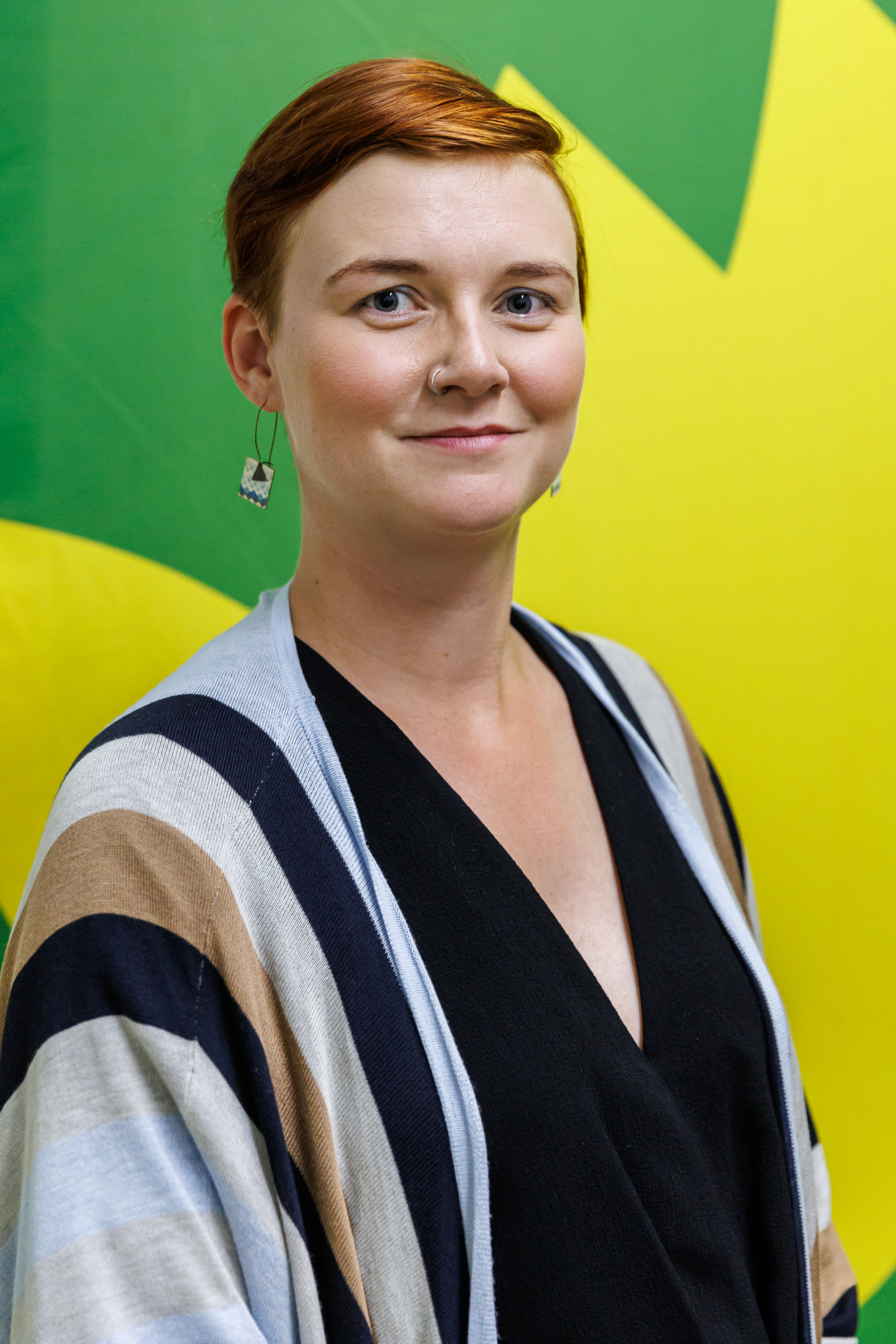
- Ann-Sophie Bohm in 2024

Spokeswoman for Alliance 90/The Greens in Thuringia
- Incumbent
- Assumed office 25 January 2020 Serving with Bernhard Stengele

Leader of Alliance 90/The Greens in the Weimar City Council
- Incumbent
- Assumed office June 2019 Serving with Andreas Leps

Member of the Weimar City Council
- Incumbent
- Assumed office 26 May 2019

Personal details
- Born: Ann-Sophie Bohm-Eisenbrandt; 21 October 1993 (age 32) Erfurt, Germany
- Party: Alliance 90/The Greens

Ann-Sophie Bohm-Eisenbrandt (born 21 October 1993) is a German politician of Alliance 90/The Greens. She has been the co-spokesperson of the party in Thuringia since January 2020. She is a member of the Weimar city council and leader of the Greens group in the council.

== Early life and education ==
Bohm-Eisenbrandt was born on 21 October 1993. She has degrees in political science and sociology, and lives in Weimar.

== Political career ==
From 2014 to 2016, Bohm-Eisenbrandt served on the city council of Halle (Saale) and was spokeswoman for animal policy for the Green state association in Saxony-Anhalt.

From 2018 to 2019 she was a member of the executive of the Greens' Weimar local association. In the 2019 Thuringian local elections, Bohm-Eisenbrandt was the party's lead candidate for the Weimar city council. The party won 18.5% of votes, making it the largest group in the council. Bohm-Eisenbrandt was subsequently elected as leader of the Greens group. In the 2019 Thuringian state election, she ran as a candidate in Weimar II, placing third with 19.8% of the vote. She was thirteenth on the Greens party list, but was not elected.

On 25 January 2020, Bohm-Eisenbrandt was elected as the spokeswoman for the state party association, alongside Bernhard Stengele.

== Political views ==
During the 2019 state election campaign, Bohm-Eisenbrandt emphasised her support for expanded and affordable public transport, improved education services, and greater inclusion of women and young people in politics. When asked what she desired Thuringia to be like in five years, she stated: "more green, more trains, more women in management positions, more teachers in schools, fewer animals in agriculture, fewer pollutants in the air, water and soil, and thus more satisfied people."
