= Second Ramelow cabinet =

State government of Thuringia

Second Cabinet of Bodo Ramelow Cabinet Ramelow II
- 10th Cabinet of Thuringia
- 2020–2024
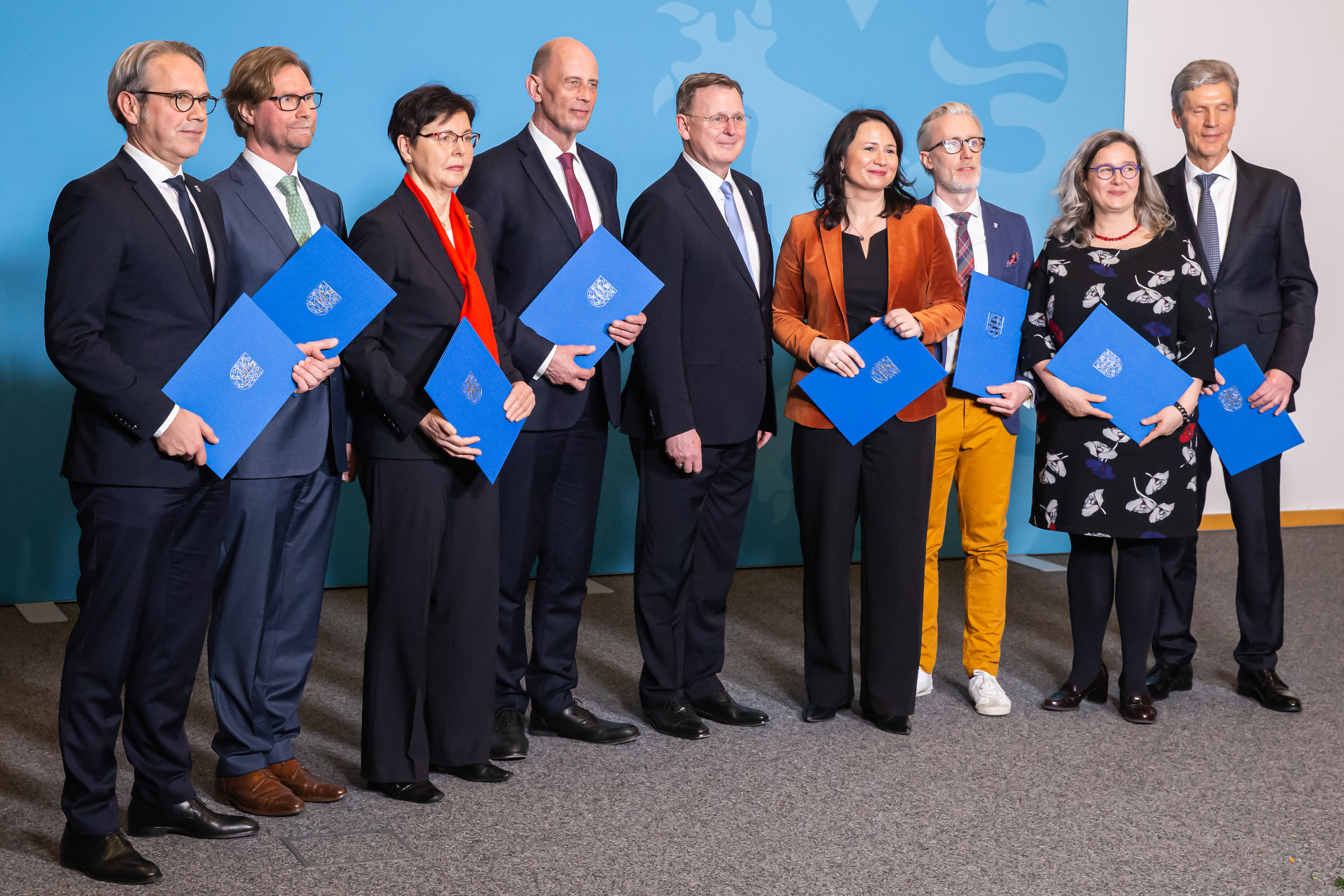
- The members of the second Ramelow cabinet at the Landtag of Thuringia plenary session on 14 March 2020 From left to right: Georg Maier, Dirk Adams, Heike Taubert, Wolfgang Tiefensee, Bodo Ramelow, Anja Siegesmund, Benjamin-Immanuel Hoff, Heike Werner, Helmut Holter
- Date formed: 4 March 2020

People and organisations
- Minister-President: Bodo Ramelow
- Deputy Minister-President: Wolfgang Tiefensee (until Aug 2021); Georg Maier (from Aug 2021) Anja Siegesmund
- No. of ministers: 8
- Member parties: The Left; Social Democratic Party; Alliance 90/The Greens
- Status in legislature: Minority coalition government
- Opposition parties: Christian Democratic Union; Alternative for Germany; Free Democratic Party

History
- Election: 2019 Thuringian state election
- Legislature term: 7th Landtag of Thuringia
- Predecessor: Kemmerich (Note: Thomas Kemmerich did not appoint any ministers during his short time in office and the ministries were led by the state secretaries of the previous government; his government was a one-person cabinet.)
- Successor: Voigt cabinet

The second Ramelow cabinet was the state government of Thuringia from 4 March 2020 to 12 December 2024 and was headed by Bodo Ramelow. It was the 10th Cabinet of Thuringia.

It was formed after the 2020 Thuringian government crisis which emerged from the 2019 Thuringian state election. The government was a coalition of The Left (LINKE), the Social Democratic Party (SPD), and Alliance 90/The Greens (GRÜNE). Excluding the Minister-President, the cabinet consisted of eight ministers. Four were members of The Left, three were members of the SPD, and two were members of the Greens.

== Formation ==
The previous cabinet was a coalition government of the Left, SPD, and Greens led by Minister-President Bodo Ramelow of The Left.

The state election took place on 27 October 2019, and resulted in the incumbent coalition losing its majority to the conservative opposition of the AfD, CDU, and FDP. However, all parties had ruled out working with the AfD, and the CDU and FDP had ruled out working with The Left. The Landtag thus became deadlocked as it was not possible to reach a majority without cooperation between two of The Left, the CDU, and the AfD.

Despite this, The Left, SPD, and Greens agreed to renew their coalition as a minority government. The election process for the Minister-President enables a candidate to win with a plurality of votes in the third round if an absolute majority is not reached in the first two.

The Landtag convened for its first session on 5 February 2020. In the first two ballots for Minister-President, there were two candidates: Bodo Ramelow of The Left, and Christoph Kindervater, an independent proposed by the AfD. They fell short of the required majority in the first and second rounds. On the third ballot, the FDP also put forward their state leader Thomas Kemmerich. Kemmerich was elected Minister-President with 45 votes, corresponding to the support of most of the AfD, CDU, and FDP. Ramelow received 44 votes, corresponding to The Left, SPD, Greens, and two members of the opposition. Kindervater received no votes. One abstention was recorded.

Minister-President election
| Ballot → | 5 February 2020 | | |
| Required majority → | 46 out of 90 | 46 out of 90 | Plurality |
| Bodo Ramelow | 43 / 90 | 44 / 90 | 44 / 90 |
| Christoph Kindervater | 25 / 90 | 22 / 90 | 0 / 90 |
| Thomas Kemmerich | Did not run | Did not run | 45 / 90 |
| Abstentions | 22 / 90 | 24 / 90 | 1 / 90 |

Kemmerich's victory was highly unexpected. Neither the CDU nor AfD had indicated that they would support him. The participation of the AfD was perceived as a breach of the cordon sanitaire practised against them by all other parties. It was condemned across the German political spectrum and protests broke out across the country. In addition, Kemmerich insisted that the AfD would not be brought into government, leaving him without a workable majority in the Landtag. He announced his resignation on 8 February.

Following joint discussions, The Left, CDU, SPD, and Greens agreed on 21 February to invest Bodo Ramelow as Minister-President to lead a Left–SPD–Green minority government ahead of a planned early election in April 2021.

Bodo Ramelow was elected Minister-President by the Landtag on 4 March after three rounds of voting. The Left, SPD, and Greens supported Ramelow, while AfD put forward state chairman Björn Höcke and the CDU abstained. The FDP was not present for the vote. Höcke withdrew on the third ballot and Ramelow was elected with 43 votes in favour, 23 against, and 20 abstentions.

Minister-President election
| Ballot → | 4 March 2020 | | |
| Required majority → | 46 out of 90 | 46 out of 90 | Plurality |
| Bodo Ramelow | 42 / 90 | 42 / 90 | 42 / 90 |
| Björn Höcke | 22 / 90 | 22 / 90 | Did not run |
| Against | N/A | | 23 / 90 |
| Abstentions | 26 / 90 | 26 / 90 | 20 / 90 |

== Composition ==
| Portfolio | Senator | Party | Took office | Left office | State secretaries |
|---|---|---|---|---|---|
| Minister-President | Bodo Ramelow born 19 February 1956 (age 70) | LINKE | 4 March 2020 | 12 December 2024 | |
| First Deputy Minister-President | Georg Maier born 25 April 1967 (age 58) | SPD | 31 August 2021 | 12 December 2024 | Udo Götze (Interior); Katharina Schenk (Communities) |
| Minister for Interior and Communities | Georg Maier born 25 April 1967 (age 58) | SPD | 4 March 2020 | 12 December 2024 | Udo Götze (Interior); Katharina Schenk (Communities) |
| Second Deputy Minister-President Minister for Environment, Energy, and Nature Protection | Anja Siegesmund born 16 January 1977 (age 49) | GRÜNE | 4 March 2020 | 31 January 2023 | Olaf Möller (until 30 April 2022); Burkhard Vogel (from 1 May 2022) |
| Second Deputy Minister-President Minister for Environment, Energy, and Nature Protection | Bernhard Stengele born 23 April 1963 (age 62) | GRÜNE | 1 February 2023 | 12 December 2024 | Burkhard Vogel |
| Minister for Migration, Justice and Consumer Protection | Dirk Adams born 25 May 1968 (age 57) | GRÜNE | 4 March 2020 | 9 January 2023 | Sebastian von Ammon |
| Minister for Migration, Justice and Consumer Protection | Anja Siegesmund (acting) born 16 January 1977 (age 49) | GRÜNE | 9 January 2023 | 31 January 2023 | Sebastian von Ammon |
| Minister for Migration, Justice and Consumer Protection | Doreen Denstädt (age 45-46) | GRÜNE | 1 February 2023 | 12 December 2024 | Meike Herz |
| Minister for Culture, Federal and European Affairs and Chief of the State Chancellery | Benjamin-Immanuel Hoff born 17 February 1976 (age 50) | LINKE | 4 March 2020 | 12 December 2024 | Malte Krückels (Media and Europe, Representative to the Federal Government); Tina Beer (Culture) |
| Minister for Infrastructure and Agriculture (acting) | Benjamin-Immanuel Hoff born 17 February 1976 (age 50) | LINKE | 4 March 2020 | 9 September 2021 | Susanna Karawanskij; Torsten Weil |
| Minister for Education, Youth and Sport | Helmut Holter born 22 May 1953 (age 72) | LINKE | 4 March 2020 | 12 December 2024 | Winfried Speitkamp |
| Minister for Infrastructure and Agriculture | Susanna Karawanskij born 7 May 1980 (age 45) | LINKE | 9 September 2021 | 12 December 2024 | Barbara Schönig; Torsten Weil |
| Minister for Finance | Heike Taubert born 14 November 1958 (age 67) | SPD | 4 March 2020 | 12 December 2024 | Hartmut Schubert |
| Minister for Economics, Science and Digital Society | Wolfgang Tiefensee born 4 January 1955 (age 71) | SPD | 4 March 2020 | 12 December 2024 | Carsten Feller (Science, Higher Education and Economics); Katja Böhler (Research, Innovation and Economic Development) |
| First Deputy Minister-President | Wolfgang Tiefensee born 4 January 1955 (age 71) | SPD | 4 March 2020 | 31 August 2021 | Carsten Feller (Science and Higher Education); Valentina Kerst (Economics and Digital Society) |
| Minister for Labour, Social Affairs, Health, Women and Family | Heike Werner born 30 May 1969 (age 56) | LINKE | 4 March 2020 | 12 December 2024 | Ines Feierabend |
