= Zippel =

Zippel may refer to:

== Surname ==
- Anna Zippel (died 1676), alleged Swedish witch, tried in Stockholm during the Swedish witch mania of 1668–1676
- Brita Zippel (died 1676), alleged Swedish witch, known as "Näslösan", one of the most famous figures of the Swedish witch mania
- Christoph Zippel (born 1982), German politician
- David Zippel (born 1954), American musical theatre lyricist
- Hermann Zippel, German lithographer and illustrator, botany teacher (end of the 19th century)
- Marty Zippel (1922–2018), American basketball player
- Rudolf Andreas Zippel (1813–1894), Lutheran priest from East Prussia

== Places ==
- Zippel Bay State Park, state park in Lake of the Woods County, Minnesota in the United States
- Zippel Township, Lake of the Woods County, Minnesota, township in Lake of the Woods County, Minnesota, United States

== See also ==
- Schwartz–Zippel lemma
