= Weimarer Land I – Saalfeld-Rudolstadt III =

Electoral constituency in Thuringia, Germany

Weimarer Land I – Saalfeld-Rudolstadt III is an electoral constituency (German: Wahlkreis) represented in the Landtag of Thuringia. It elects one member via first-past-the-post voting, but other candidates might become member of parliament via their party list.

Weimarer Land I – Saalfeld-Rudolstadt III was created for the 1994 state election. Originally named Weimar-Land I – Schwarzakreis III, it was renamed after the 1994 election. Under the current constituency numbering system, it is designated as constituency 30. It covers the western and southern of Weimarer Land and the northern part of Saalfeld-Rudolstadt.

== Geography ==
As of the 2019 state election, Weimarer Land I – Saalfeld-Rudolstadt III covers the western and southern of Weimarer Land and the northern part of Saalfeld-Rudolstadt, specifically the municipalities of Am Ettersberg, Bad Berka, Ballstedt, Bechstedtstraß, Blankenhain, Buchfart, Daasdorf a. Berge, Döbritschen, Ettersburg, Frankendorf, Großschwabhausen, Hammerstedt, Hetschburg, Hohenfelden, Hopfgarten, Ilmtal-Weinstraße (only Leutenthal and Rohrbach), Isseroda, Kapellendorf, Kiliansroda, Kleinschwabhausen, Klettbach, Kranichfeld, Lehnstedt, Magdala, Mechelroda, Mellingen, Mönchenholzhausen, Nauendorf, Neumark, Niederzimmern, Nohra, Oettern, Ottstedt a. Berge, Rittersdorf, Tonndorf, Troistedt, Umpferstedt, Vollersroda, and Wiegendorf (from Weimarer Land), and Rudolstadt (only Ammelstädt, Breitenherda, Eschdorf, Geitersdorf, Haufeld, Heilsberg, Milbitz, Remda, Sundremda, Teichel, Teichröda and Treppendorf), and Uhlstädt-Kirchhasel (from Saalfeld-Rudolstadt).

== Members ==
The constituency had been held by the Christian Democratic Union (CDU) from its creation in 1994 until 2024. Its first representative was Bärbel Vopel, who served two terms from 1994 to 2004. From 2004 to 2024, it was represented by Mike Mohring in four terms. Since 2024, it is represented by Brunhilde Nauer from the Alternative for Germany.

Election	Member	Party	%
1994	Bärbel Vopel	CDU	47.6
1999	Bärbel Vopel	CDU	51.5
2004	Mike Mohring	CDU	45.9
2009	Mike Mohring	CDU	34.9
2014	Mike Mohring	CDU	44.7
2019	Mike Mohring	CDU	31.2
2024	Brunhilde Nauer	AfD	38.2

== Election results ==
=== 2024 election ===
State election (2024): Weimarer Land I/Saalfeld-Rudolstadt III
Notes:	Blue background denotes the winner of the electorate vote. Pink background denotes a candidate elected from their party list. Yellow background denotes an electorate win by a list member, or other incumbent. A ✓ or ✗ denotes status of any incumbent, win or lose respectively.						
Party	Candidate	Votes	%	±%	Party votes	%	±%
AfD	Brunhilde Ursula Margit Nauer	11,629	38.2	▲12.8	10,312	33.4	▲8.3
CDU	✗ Mike Mohring	9,461	31.1	▼0.1	6,837	22.1	▼2.1
BSW					5,463	17.7	
Left	Benjamin Immanuel Hope	4,835	15.9	▼8.5	3,807	12.3	▼15.7
SPD	Dirk Slawinsky	2,406	7.9	▲0.5	1,620	5.2	▼1.5
Greens					853	2.8	▼1.8
FW	Gerd Gunstheimer	2,092	6.9		503	1.6	
FDP					453	1.5	▼3.8
APT					357	1.2	▲0.2
Values					205	0.7	
Familie					178	0.6	
BD					161	0.5	
Pirates					78	0.3	Steady
ÖDP					44	0.1	▼0.3
MLPD					27	0.1	▼0.1
Informal votes		769			294		
Total valid votes		20,423			30,898		
Turnout		31,192	79.2	▲8.2			
AfD gain from CDU	Majority	2,168	7.1				

=== 2019 election ===
State election (2019): Weimarer Land I – Saalfeld-Rudolstadt III
Notes:	Blue background denotes the winner of the electorate vote. Pink background denotes a candidate elected from their party list. Yellow background denotes an electorate win by a list member, or other incumbent. A ✓ or ✗ denotes status of any incumbent, win or lose respectively.						
Party	Candidate	Votes	%	±%	Party votes	%	±%
CDU	✓ Mike Mohring	9,335	31.2	▼13.5	7,257	24.2	▼11.7
AfD	Torben Braga	7,594	25.4		7,534	25.1	▲13.6
Left	Robin Schünemann	7,295	24.4	▼4.2	8,403	28.0	▲2.4
SPD	Jens Hoffmann	2,156	7.2	▼5.0	2,000	6.7	▼3.8
FDP	Patrick Martin	1,845	6.2		1,886	6.3	▲3.6
Greens	Carl Eisenbrandt	1,567	5.2	▼2.6	1,374	4.6	▼1.1
MLPD	Michael Wist	91	0.3		57	0.2	
List-only parties					1,569	5.2	
Informal votes		522			382		
Total valid votes		29,883			30,023		
Turnout		30,405	71.0	▲11.2			
CDU hold	Majority	1,741	5.8	▼10.3			

=== 2014 election ===
State election (2014): Weimarer Land I – Saalfeld-Rudolstadt III
Notes:	Blue background denotes the winner of the electorate vote. Pink background denotes a candidate elected from their party list. Yellow background denotes an electorate win by a list member, or other incumbent. A ✓ or ✗ denotes status of any incumbent, win or lose respectively.						
Party	Candidate	Votes	%	±%	Party votes	%	±%
CDU	✓ Mike Mohring	10,449	44.7	▲9.8	8,518	35.9	▲3.3
Left	Steffen Dittes	6,683	28.6	▲3.6	6,073	25.6	▲1.0
AfD					2,738	11.5	
SPD	Wilfried Regenhardt	2,851	12.2	▼3.1	2,497	10.5	▼6.6
Greens	Stephanie Erben	1,823	7.8	▼1.3	1,347	5.7	▼0.9
NPD	Sören Schmidt	1,564	6.7	▲0.4	1,041	4.4	▼1.2
List-only parties					1,522	6.4	
Informal votes		731			365		
Total valid votes		23,370			23,736		
Turnout		24,101	59.8	▼1.2			
CDU hold	Majority	3,766	16.1	▲6.2			

=== 2009 election ===
State election (2009): Weimarer Land I – Saalfeld-Rudolstadt III
Notes:	Blue background denotes the winner of the electorate vote. Pink background denotes a candidate elected from their party list. Yellow background denotes an electorate win by a list member, or other incumbent. A ✓ or ✗ denotes status of any incumbent, win or lose respectively.						
Party	Candidate	Votes	%	±%	Party votes	%	±%
CDU	✓ Mike Mohring	8,765	34.9	▼11.0	8,237	32.6	▼13.1
Left	Andreas Schuster	6,297	25.0	▼2.6	6,207	24.6	▲1.4
SPD	Wilfried Regenhardt	3,841	15.3	▲0.4	4,322	17.1	▲3.9
FDP	Sandra Scherf-Michel	2,356	9.4	▲3.2	2,253	8.9	▲4.9
NPD	Jan Morgenroth	1,595	6.3		1,417	5.6	▲3.2
List-only parties					2,842	11.2	
Informal votes		588			448		
Total valid votes		25,138			25,278		
Turnout		25,726	61.0	▲0.5			
CDU hold	Majority	2,468	9.9	▼8.4			

=== 2004 election ===
State election (2004): Weimarer Land I – Saalfeld-Rudolstadt III
Notes:	Blue background denotes the winner of the electorate vote. Pink background denotes a candidate elected from their party list. Yellow background denotes an electorate win by a list member, or other incumbent. A ✓ or ✗ denotes status of any incumbent, win or lose respectively.						
Party	Candidate	Votes	%	±%	Party votes	%	±%
CDU	Mike Mohring	11,159	45.9	▼5.8	11,352	45.7	▼8.5
PDS	Andreas Schuster	6,722	27.6	▲9.6	5,750	23.2	▲6.1
SPD	Nico Janicke	3,621	14.9	▼4.0	3,275	13.2	▼4.1
FDP	Andreas Johne	1,511	6.2	▲4.0	991	4.0	▲2.9
Greens	Mario Wildner	1,302	5.4	▲3.2	1,112	4.5	▲2.7
List-only parties					2,352	9.5	
Informal votes		1,503			986		
Total valid votes		24,315			24,832		
Turnout		25,818	60.5	▼5.3			
CDU hold	Majority	4,437	18.3	▼14.3			

=== 1999 election ===
State election (1999): Weimarer Land I – Saalfeld-Rudolstadt III
Notes:	Blue background denotes the winner of the electorate vote. Pink background denotes a candidate elected from their party list. Yellow background denotes an electorate win by a list member, or other incumbent. A ✓ or ✗ denotes status of any incumbent, win or lose respectively.						
Party	Candidate	Votes	%	±%	Party votes	%	±%
CDU	✓ Bärbel Vopel	13,366	51.5	▲4.0	14,110	54.1	▲6.7
SPD	Eberhard Lüdde	4,897	18.9	▼9.1	4,504	17.3	▼10.9
PDS	Klaus Dinor	4,664	18.0	▲6.2	4,474	17.2	▲5.1
VIBT	Gerhard Pletat	1,017	3.9		476	1.8	
REP	Michael Wahle	841	3.2		244	0.9	▼0.4
Greens	Christine Meinecke	588	2.3	▼6.2	481	1.8	▼3.1
FDP	Volker Jungklaus	571	2.2	▼2.0	293	1.1	▼2.7
List-only parties					1,498	5.7	
Informal votes		551			415		
Total valid votes		25,944			26,080		
Turnout		26,495	66.2	▼10.8			
CDU hold	Majority	8,469	32.6	▲13.0			

=== 1994 election ===
State election (1994): Weimar-Land I – Schwarzakreis III
Notes:	Blue background denotes the winner of the electorate vote. Pink background denotes a candidate elected from their party list. Yellow background denotes an electorate win by a list member, or other incumbent. A ✓ or ✗ denotes status of any incumbent, win or lose respectively.						
Party	Candidate	Votes	%	±%	Party votes	%	±%
CDU	Bärbel Vopel	12,527	47.6		12,509	47.4	
SPD		7,372	28.0		7,435	28.2	
PDS		3,111	11.8		3,213	12.2	
Greens		2,235	8.5		1,299	4.9	
FDP		1,093	4.1		993	3.8	
List-only parties					953	3.6	
Informal votes		806			742		
Total valid votes		26,338			26,402		
Turnout		27,144	77.0				
CDU win new seat	Majority	5,155	19.6				
