= Torben Braga =

German politician

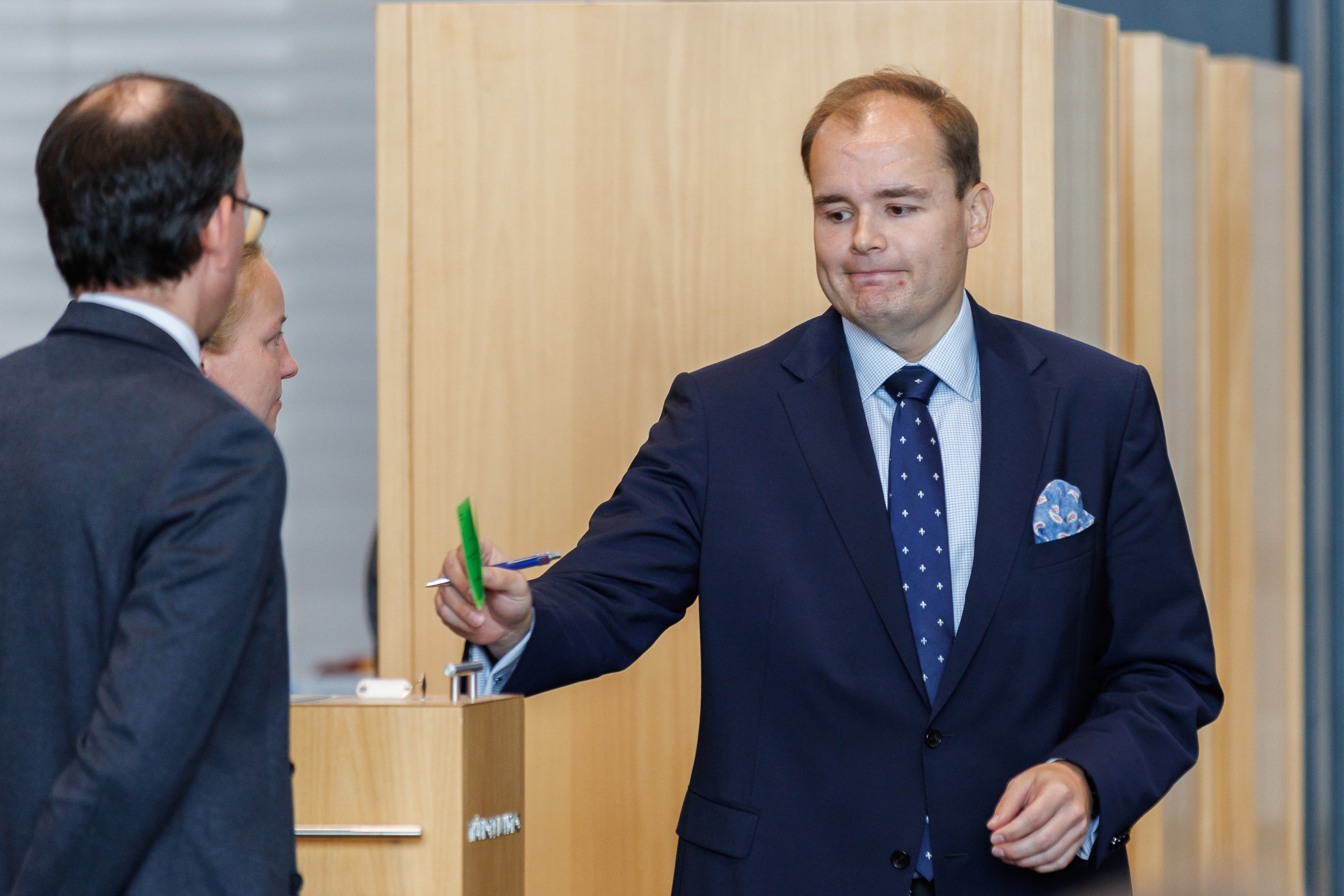
Braga in 2024

Torben Braga (born 1991 in Niterói, Brazil) is a German politician of the Alternative for Germany (AfD), previously FDP. He entered the state parliament of Thuringia after the state elections of 27 October 2019.

== Early life ==
After graduating from the German School in Rio de Janeiro in 2009, Braga studied political science and public law from 2010 to 2018 at the Friedrich Schiller University of Jena and at the Philipps University of Marburg. He completed his studies with a Master of Arts.

During his studies he became a member of the Jena fraternity Germania and the Marburg fraternity Germania. In 2015, Braga was a spokesman for the right-wing extremist Deutsche Burschenschaft. Braga lives in Ronneburg, Thuringia.

== Politics ==
Torben Braga was a member of the Liberal Party FDP from 2012 to 2015. In the end of 2015, he joined AfD. Since 2016 he has been an assessor on the state board of the AfD Thuringia and the press spokesman. In November 2020 he was elected deputy chairman of the Thuringian state association.

In the 2019 Thuringian state election of 27 October 2019, he was second in Weimarer Land I – Saalfeld-Rudolstadt III constituency, but was anyway elected to the state parliament of Thuringia via the party list. The state was in a deadlock as the left wing coalition of three parties (Left, SPD, Greens) had no majority anymore, but the mathematical center-right majority of CDU, FDP and AfD was unable to act as no other party wanted to cooperate with the AfD. This led to the 2020 Thuringian government crisis. The election of a FDP member as Thuringian Minister President (for a short time) in 2020 attracted considerable national and international attention because, for the first time in the history of the Federal Republic of Germany, a Minister President was elected due to votes from a far-right populist party, in this case the AfD. Braga was credited with the idea that AfD members would vote for their own candidate only in the first two rounds, with a surprising switch to the FDP candidate in the third round.

For the 2021 German federal election, Braga was elected on 8 May 2021 by the AfD Thuringia to number 4 on the list. He also ran as a direct candidate for the AfD in the Jena – Sömmerda – Weimarer Land I federal constituency. Braga narrowly missed the majority of the first votes in the constituency and did not enter the Bundestag via the state list.

He was re-elected to the Landtag of Thuringia in the 2024 Thuringian state election of 1 September 2024, this time in the constituency Altenburger Land II.

=== Networking with Neue Rechte ===
Torben Braga is considered the right-hand man of the völkisch "AfD-Star" Björn Höcke in the Thuringian state parliament.

He is a member of the Germania fraternity in Marburg, which is associated with the Neue Rechte. Members of the Institute for State Policy gave lectures there. He was spokesman for the right-wing extremist association of nationalist fraternities.
