= Weimar II =

Electoral constituency in Thuringia, Germany

Weimar II is an electoral constituency (German: Wahlkreis) represented in the Landtag of Thuringia. It elects one member via first-past-the-post voting. Under the current constituency numbering system, it is designated as constituency 32. It covers most of the city of Weimar.

Weimar II was created for the 1994 state election. Originally named just Weimar, it was renamed before the 2014 election after a small part of the city of Weimar was transferred to Weimar I – Weimarer Land II. Since 2024, it has been represented by Ulrike Grosse-Röthig of The Left.

== Geography ==
As of the 2019 state election, Weimar II covers most of the city of Weimar, specifically the city districts (Ortsteile) of Ettersberg-Siedlung, Gaberndorf, Gelmeroda, Innenstadt, Legefeld/Holzdorf, Niedergrunstedt, Nördliche Innenstadt, Nordstadt, Oberweimar/Ehringsdorf, Possendorf, Südstadt, Südweststadt, Taubach, Tröbsdorf, Weimar-Nord, and Weimar-West.

== Members ==
The constituency was held by the Christian Democratic Union (CDU) from its creation in 1994 until 2009, during which time it was represented by Frank-Michael Pietzsch (1994–2004) and Peter D. Krause (2004–2009). It was won by The Left in 2009, and represented by Thomas Hartung, who defected to the Social Democratic Party (SPD) in 2010 and served the remainder of his term as a member of that party. The CDU's candidate Jörg Geibert regained the constituency in 2014. It was again won by The Left in 2019, and is represented by Steffen Dittes, followed by Ulrike Grosse-Röthig from 2024.

Election	Member	Party	%
1994	Frank-Michael Pietzsch	CDU	38.5
1999	Frank-Michael Pietzsch	CDU	47.5
2004	Peter D. Krause	CDU	37.9
2009	Thomas Hartung (Note: Hartung was elected in 2009 for The Left, but defected to the SPD parliamentary group in August 2010.)	LINKE	28.4
2009	Thomas Hartung	SPD	28.4
2014	Jörg Geibert	CDU	31.1
2019	Steffen Dittes	LINKE	28.6
2024	Ulrike Grosse-Röthig	LINKE	33.1

== Election results ==
=== 2024 election ===
State election (2024): Weimar II
Notes:	Blue background denotes the winner of the electorate vote. Pink background denotes a candidate elected from their party list. Yellow background denotes an electorate win by a list member, or other incumbent. A ✓ or ✗ denotes status of any incumbent, win or lose respectively.						
Party	Candidate	Votes	%	±%	Party votes	%	±%
Left	Ulrike Grosse-Röthig	11,059	33.1	▲4.5	6,624	19.4	▼16.0
CDU	Lennart Geibert	8,845	26.5	▲1.6	7,052	20.7	▲3.5
AfD	Marcus Cebulla	7,019	21.0		6,527	19.1	▲4.9
BSW					5,103	15.0	
Greens	Ann-Sophie Bohm	3,445	10.3	▼9.5	3,584	10.5	▼2.6
SPD					3,477	10.2	▲0.9
FDP	Thomas Jeremias Kemmerich	1,198	3.6	▼5.5	469	1.4	▼4.0
Values	Clarsen Ratz	1,013	3.0		248	0.7	
FW	Anton Pasler	844	2.5		203	0.6	
APT					328	1.0	▲0.1
Pirates					147	0.4	▼0.1
Familie					124	0.4	
BD					107	0.3	
ÖDP					64	0.2	▼0.2
MLPD					33	0.1	▼0.1
Informal votes		920			253		
Total valid votes		33,423			34,090		
Turnout		34,343	76.7	▲8.0			
Left hold	Majority	2,214	6.6	▲2.9			

=== 2019 election ===
State election (2019): Weimar II
Notes:	Blue background denotes the winner of the electorate vote. Pink background denotes a candidate elected from their party list. Yellow background denotes an electorate win by a list member, or other incumbent. A ✓ or ✗ denotes status of any incumbent, win or lose respectively.						
Party	Candidate	Votes	%	±%	Party votes	%	±%
Left	Steffen Dittes	8,396	28.6	▲0.3	10,838	35.4	▲7.5
CDU	✗ Jörg Geibert	7,314	24.9	▼6.2	5,254	17.2	▼11.8
AfD					4,355	14.2	▲6.8
Greens	Ann-Sophie Bohm-Eisenbrandt	5,811	19.8	▲7.7	4,004	13.1	▼1.3
SPD	Thomas Hartung (Note: Hartung entered the Landtag on the SPD list after the resignation of Wolfgang Tiefensee in December 2019.)	4,890	16.6	▼2.5	2,849	9.3	▼2.6
FDP	Hagen Hultzsch	2,684	9.1	▲5.9	1,662	5.4	▲2.2
MLPD	Cornelia Jungk	297	1.0		71	0.2	
List-only parties					1,562	5.1	
Informal votes		1,530			327		
Total valid votes		29,392			30,595		
Turnout		30,922	68.7	▲13.3			
Left gain from CDU	Majority	1,082	3.7				

=== 2014 election ===
State election (2014): Weimar II
Notes:	Blue background denotes the winner of the electorate vote. Pink background denotes a candidate elected from their party list. Yellow background denotes an electorate win by a list member, or other incumbent. A ✓ or ✗ denotes status of any incumbent, win or lose respectively.						
Party	Candidate	Votes	%	±%	Party votes	%	±%
CDU	Jörg Geibert	7,806	31.1	▲2.7	7,320	29.0	▲3.2
Left	Dirk Möller	7,104	28.3	▼0.1	7,036	27.9	▲2.8
SPD	✗ Thomas Hartung (Note: Hartung entered the Landtag on the SPD list after the resignation of Uwe Höhn in September 2017.)	4,795	19.1	▲2.7 (Note: Hartung was elected in 2009 as a candidate for The Left, but contested the constituency in 2014 as candidate for the SPD. The swing given is compared to the SPD's performance in 2009.)	3,010	11.9	▼7.0
Greens	Manfredo Koessl	3,037	12.1	▼5.1	3,629	14.4	▼0.4
AfD					1,863	7.4	
FDP	Christian Lachnitt	803	3.2	▼5.2	812	3.2	▼4.7
NPD	Jan Morgenroth	770	3.1	▼0.4	503	2.0	▼1.0
Pirates	Michael Kurt Bahr	748	3.0		451	1.8	
List-only parties					585	2.3	
Informal votes		400			254		
Total valid votes		25,063			25,209		
Turnout		25,463	55.4	▼4.8			
CDU gain from SPD	Majority	702	2.8				

=== 2009 election ===
State election (2009): Weimar
Notes:	Blue background denotes the winner of the electorate vote. Pink background denotes a candidate elected from their party list. Yellow background denotes an electorate win by a list member, or other incumbent. A ✓ or ✗ denotes status of any incumbent, win or lose respectively.						
Party	Candidate	Votes	%	±%	Party votes	%	±%
Left	Thomas Hartung	8,466	28.4	▲1.7	7,520	25.1	▲1.6
CDU	✗ Peter D. Krause	7,717	25.9	▼12.0	7,726	25.8	▼11.9
Greens	Carsten Meyer	5,112	17.2	▲4.5	4,433	14.8	▲2.3
SPD	Thomas Notzke	4,896	16.4	▼1.7	5,663	18.9	▲3.3
FDP	Matthias Purdel	2,491	8.4	▲3.8	2,367	7.9	▲4.2
NPD	Ralf Markert	1,094	3.7		965	3.2	▲2.3
List-only parties					1,236	4.1	
Informal votes		574			440		
Total valid votes		29,776			29,910		
Turnout		30,350	58.9	▲3.8			
Left gain from CDU	Majority	749	2.5				

=== 2004 election ===
State election (2004): Weimar
Notes:	Blue background denotes the winner of the electorate vote. Pink background denotes a candidate elected from their party list. Yellow background denotes an electorate win by a list member, or other incumbent. A ✓ or ✗ denotes status of any incumbent, win or lose respectively.						
Party	Candidate	Votes	%	±%	Party votes	%	±%
CDU	Peter D. Krause	10,195	37.9	▼9.6	10,305	37.7	▼11.2
PDS	Dirk Möller	7,164	26.7	▲5.2	6,424	23.5	▲2.8
SPD	Matthias Bettenhäuser	4,867	18.1	▼3.7	4,257	15.6	▼3.7
Greens	Petra Streit	3,412	12.7	▲7.2	3,415	12.5	▲7.7
FDP	Christoph Burmeister	1,240	4.6	▲3.0	1,020	3.7	▲2.7
List-only parties					1,907	7.0	
Informal votes		1,415			965		
Total valid votes		26,878			27,328		
Turnout		28,293	55.1	▼5.2			
CDU hold	Majority	3,031	11.2	▼14.5			

=== 1999 election ===
State election (1999): Weimar
Notes:	Blue background denotes the winner of the electorate vote. Pink background denotes a candidate elected from their party list. Yellow background denotes an electorate win by a list member, or other incumbent. A ✓ or ✗ denotes status of any incumbent, win or lose respectively.						
Party	Candidate	Votes	%	±%	Party votes	%	±%
CDU	✓ Frank-Michael Pietzsch	13,810	47.5	▲9.0	14,263	48.9	▲11.2
SPD	Irene Ellenberger	6,333	21.8	▼8.5	5,635	19.3	▼9.8
PDS	Dirk Möller	6,240	21.5	▲5.3	6,035	20.7	▲4.1
Greens	Ulrike-Lilly Koßmann	1,605	5.5	▼3.9	1,388	4.8	▼2.6
REP	Frank Welsch	625	2.1		186	0.6	▼0.6
FDP	Maria-Elisabeth Grosse	471	1.6	▼4.0	296	1.0	▼3.3
List-only parties					1,361	4.7	
Informal votes		426			346		
Total valid votes		29,084			29,164		
Turnout		29,510	60.3	▼13.8			
CDU hold	Majority	7,477	25.7	▲17.5			

=== 1994 election ===
State election (1994): Weimar
Notes:	Blue background denotes the winner of the electorate vote. Pink background denotes a candidate elected from their party list. Yellow background denotes an electorate win by a list member, or other incumbent. A ✓ or ✗ denotes status of any incumbent, win or lose respectively.						
Party	Candidate	Votes	%	±%	Party votes	%	±%
CDU	Frank-Michael Pietzsch	13,395	38.5		13,143	37.7	
SPD		10,531	30.3		10,138	29.1	
PDS		5,617	16.2		5,799	16.6	
Greens		3,277	9.4		2,594	7.4	
FDP		1,931	5.6		1,514	4.3	
List-only parties					1,683	4.8	
Informal votes		904			784		
Total valid votes		34,751			34,871		
Turnout		35,655	74.1				
CDU win new seat	Majority	2,864	8.2				
