= Ulrike Grosse-Röthig =

German politician (born 1980)

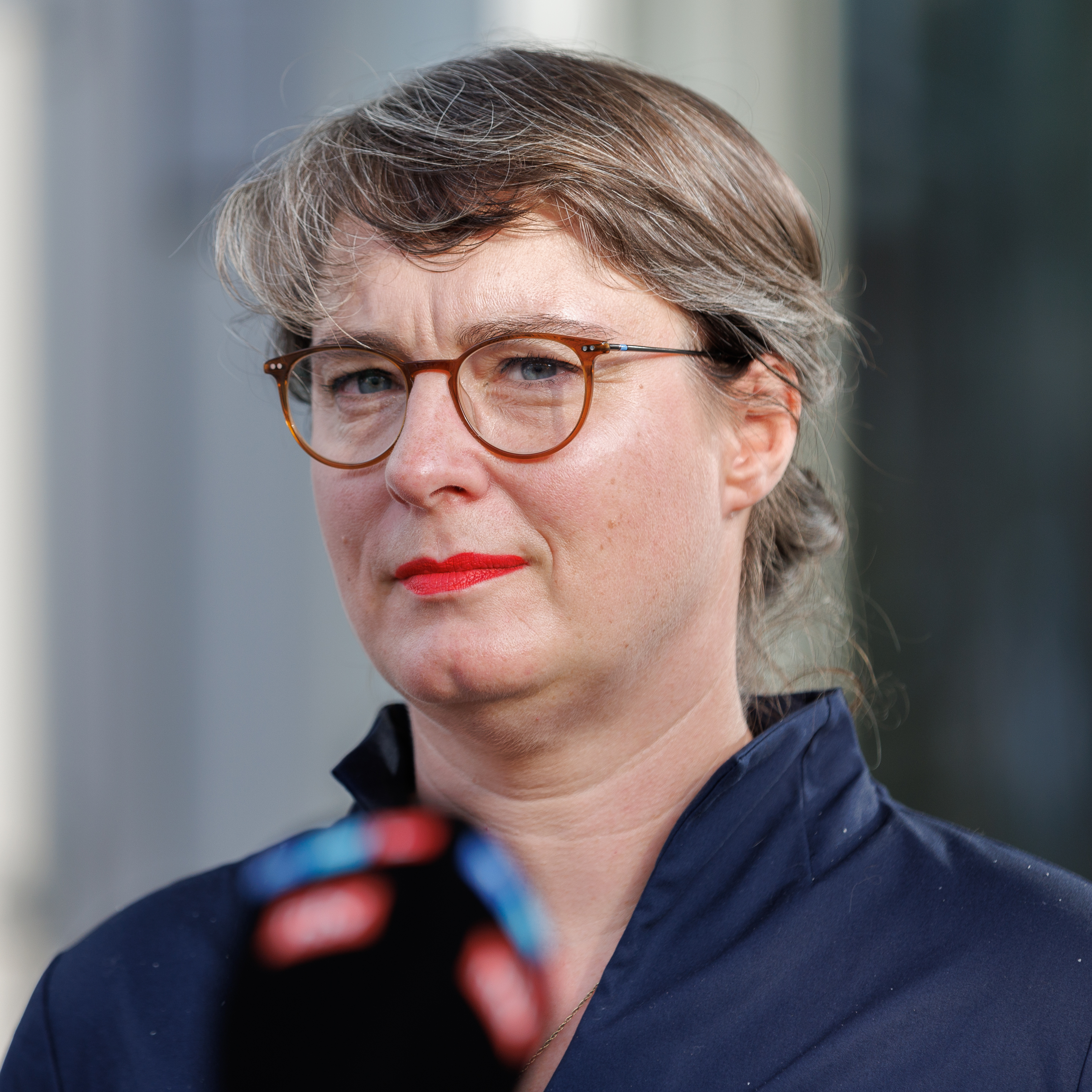
- Grosse-Röthig in 2024

Member of the Landtag of Thuringia
- Incumbent
- Assumed office 26 September 2024
- Preceded by: Steffen Dittes
- Constituency: Weimar II

Personal details
- Born: 21 March 1980 (age 46) Weimar
- Party: Die Linke

Ulrike Grosse-Röthig (born 21 March 1980 in Weimar) is a German politician serving as a member of the Landtag of Thuringia since 2024. From 2021 to 2025, she served as co-chair of Die Linke in Thuringia.
