= Steffen Dittes =

German politician (born 1973)

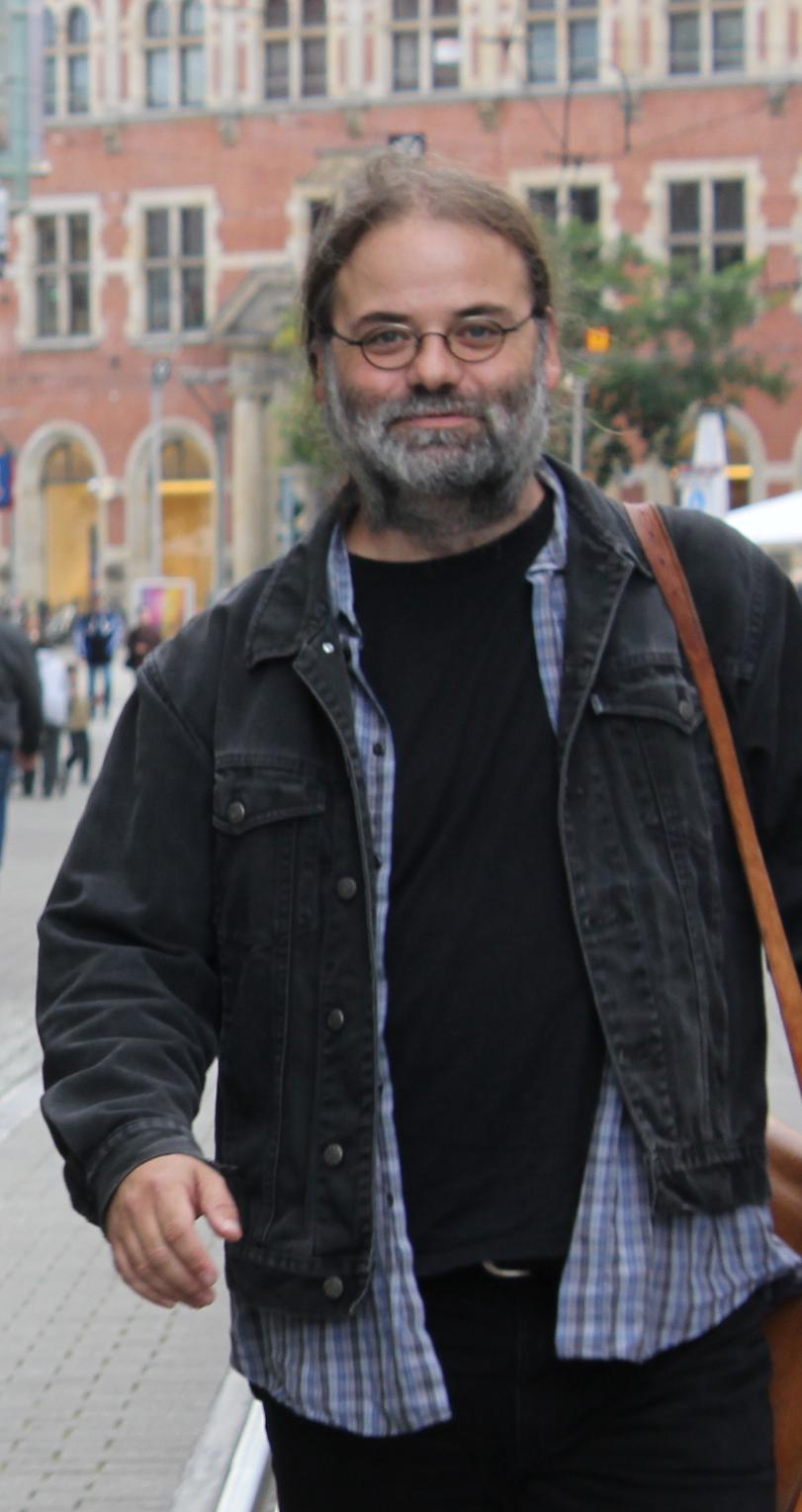
Steffen Dittes in September 2014

Steffen Dittes (born 23 June 1973 in Weimar) is a German politician (Die Linke, PDS). He was a member of the Landtag of Thuringia from 1994 to 2004 and again between 2014 and 2024. From March 2021 to September 2024 he was chairman of his parliamentary group in the Thuringian state parliament.

== Life ==
After attending school, Steffen Dittes completed vocational training and obtained a high school diploma as an electronics technician from 1990 to 1993. While working, he studied from 2001 to 2004 at the Thuringian Academy of Administration and Economics in Erfurt, graduating with a degree in administrative business administration (VWA). From 2005 to 2008 he studied political science (BA in political science) at the University of Erfurt.

== Political career ==
Dittes initially belonged to the Party of Democratic Socialism and was elected to the Thuringian state parliament in 1994, where he remained until 2004. From 1999 to 2011 he was a member of the city council of Arnstadt, and since 2004 as parliamentary group leader. In the 2014 Thuringian state election, he was again elected via the state list. In the state parliament, he is the domestic policy spokesman for the DIE LINKE parliamentary group. He maintains his constituency office in Weimar. In the 6th and 7th electoral terms of the Thuringian state parliament (2014–2019 and from 2019), he was elected chairman of the Interior and Local Government Committee.

Since November 2013, Dittes has been deputy state chairman of the Thuringian state association of the Left Party. In the 2019 Thuringian state election, he received the direct mandate in the Weimar II constituency. After the election of the previous state party leader Susanne Hennig-Wellsow as federal party leader, he took over the state party chairmanship on an interim basis at the beginning of March 2021 together with Heike Werner. On 6 March 2021 he was appointed the new chairman of the Thuringian state parliamentary group of the Left Party, also succeeding Hennig-Wellsow. After his election as parliamentary group leader, Sascha Bilay succeeded him as the new chairman of the Interior Committee.

He did not stand in the 2024 Thuringian state election and so left the state parliament.

== Memberships ==
In addition to his parliamentary work, Steffen Dittes is a member of ver.di, Alternative 54 e. V. and the Thuringia Refugee Council.
