= Mike Mohring (politician) =

German politician

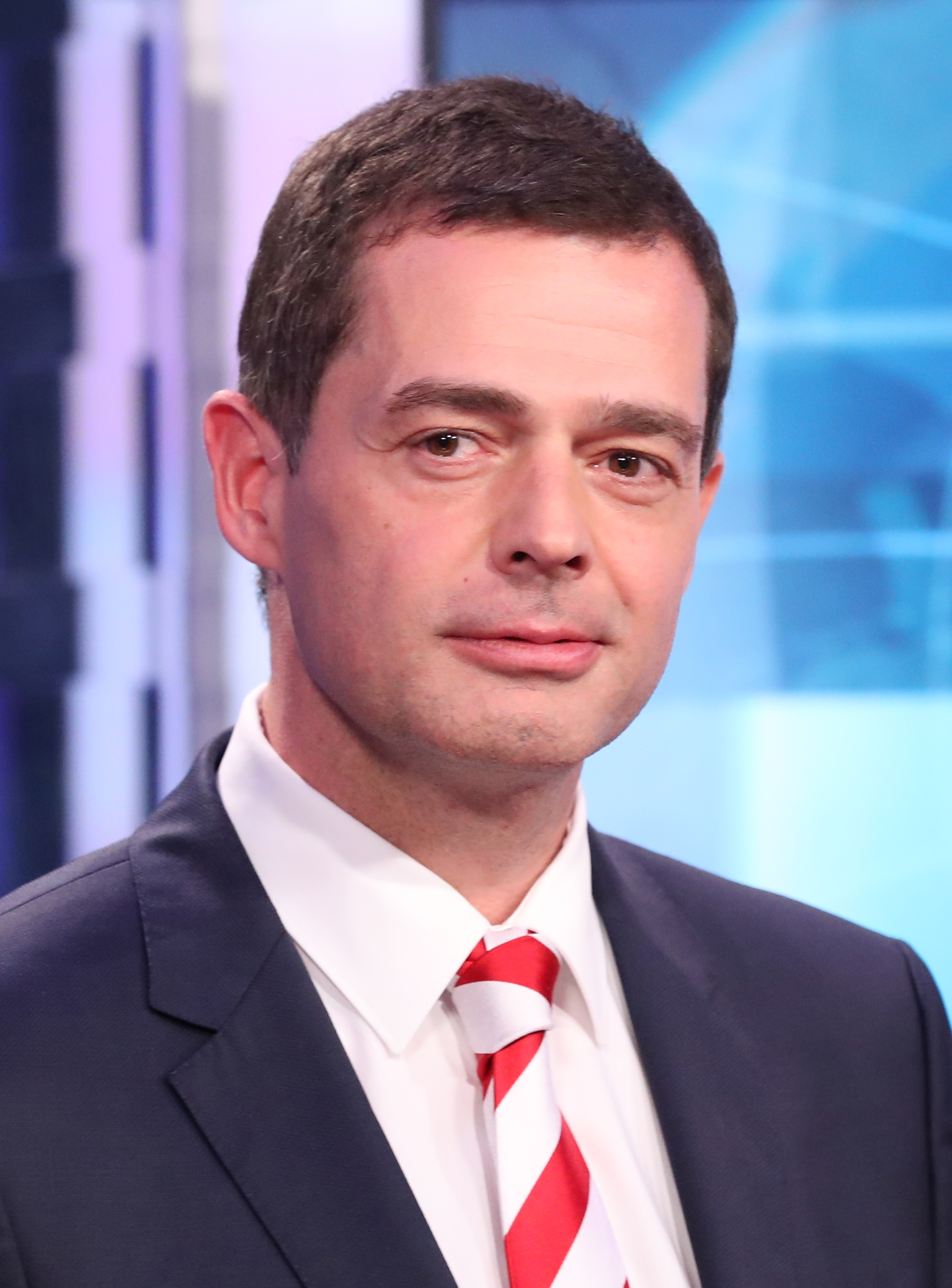

Leader of the Christian Democratic Union in Thuringia
- In office 13 December 2014 – 19 September 2020
- Deputy: Birgit Diezel; Christian Hirte; Mario Voigt
- Preceded by: Christine Lieberknecht
- Succeeded by: Christian Hirte

Leader of the Christian Democratic Union in the Landtag of Thuringia
- In office 8 May 2008 – 2 March 2020
- Preceded by: Christine Lieberknecht
- Succeeded by: Mario Voigt

General Secretary of the Christian Democratic Union of Thuringia
- In office 3 December 2004 – 8 May 2008
- Leader: Dieter Althaus

Member of the Landtag of Thuringia for Weimarer Land I - Saalfeld-Rudolstadt III (CDU List; 1999–2004)
- Incumbent
- Assumed office 1 October 1999
- Preceded by: Bärbel Vopel (Weimarer Land I – Saalfeld-Rudolstadt III)

Personal details
- Born: 22 December 1971 (age 54) Apolda, East Germany
- Party: New Forum (1989-1993); Christian Democratic Union (1993–present)
- Education: Frankfurt School of Finance & Management

Mike Mohring (born 22 December 1971) is a German politician of the Christian Democratic Union (CDU).

== Early life and education ==
Mohring grew up in the GDR. On a scholarship of the Hanns Seidel Foundation, he studied law at the University of Jena, without completing the degree. He later completed a double degree program in international business and tax law at the Frankfurt School of Finance & Management and the MCI Management Center Innsbruck from 2007 until 2009.

== Political career ==
=== Career in state politics ===
Mohring started his political career during the fall of the Berlin Wall by joining the New Forum. In 1993 he became a member of the CDU.

Mohring was first elected to the Landtag in the 1999 state elections. In parliament, he served on the Committee on Internal Affairs (1999–2004) and on the Budget Committee (1999–2009). From 2008, he chaired the CDU parliamentary group.

In 2014, Mohring became leader of his party in Thuringia. He was reelected in 2016. In this capacity, he led the party's campaign for the 2019 state elections.

=== Role in national politics ===
On the national level, Mohring served as a CDU delegate to the Federal Convention for the purpose of electing the President of Germany in 2009, 2010 and 2012.

In the negotiations to form a fourth coalition government under Chancellor Angela Merkel following the 2017 federal elections, Mohring was part of the working group on economic affairs, led by Thomas Strobl, Alexander Dobrindt and Brigitte Zypries. In 2019, he was appointed by the leaders of CDU and CSU, Annegret Kramp-Karrenbauer and Markus Söder, to the parties’ ad-hoc steering group on climate policy.

In September 2020, Mohring announced that he would run for a parliamentary seat in the 2021 national elections. He did not succeed in Jena – Sömmerda – Weimarer Land I, and in 2024 also lost the state constituency Weimarer Land I – Saalfeld-Rudolstadt III.

== Other positions ==
- Mitteldeutscher Rundfunk (MDR), Member of the Broadcasting Council
- HSV Apolda, Member

== Political positions ==
In October 2015, amid the European migrant crisis, Mohring visited a refugee camp in Lebanon to learn more about the plight of Syrians fleeing the violence in the ongoing Syrian civil war that erupted in 2011; he subsequently demanded more German support for Syria's neighbors.

Ahead of the Christian Democrats’ leadership election in 2018, Mohring publicly opposed Friedrich Merz's candidacy to succeed Angela Merkel as the party's chair. For the 2021 national elections, he later endorsed Armin Laschet as the Christian Democrats' joint candidate to succeed Merkel as chancellor.
