= Brunhilde Nauer =

German politician (born 1959)

Member of the Landtag of Thuringia
- Incumbent
- Assumed office 1 September 2024
- Constituency: Weimarer Land I – Saalfeld-Rudolstadt III

Personal details
- Born: 1959 (age 66–67) Torgelow
- Party: Alternative for Germany
- Occupation: politician

Brunhilde Ursula Margit Nauer (born 1959 in Torgelow) is a German politician from the Alternative for Germany (AFD). She was elected to the Landtag of Thuringia in the 2024 Thuringian state election in Weimarer Land I – Saalfeld-Rudolstadt III.

She is a horticultural engineer and administrative manager from Rudolstadt.
