= Anja Siegesmund =

German politician

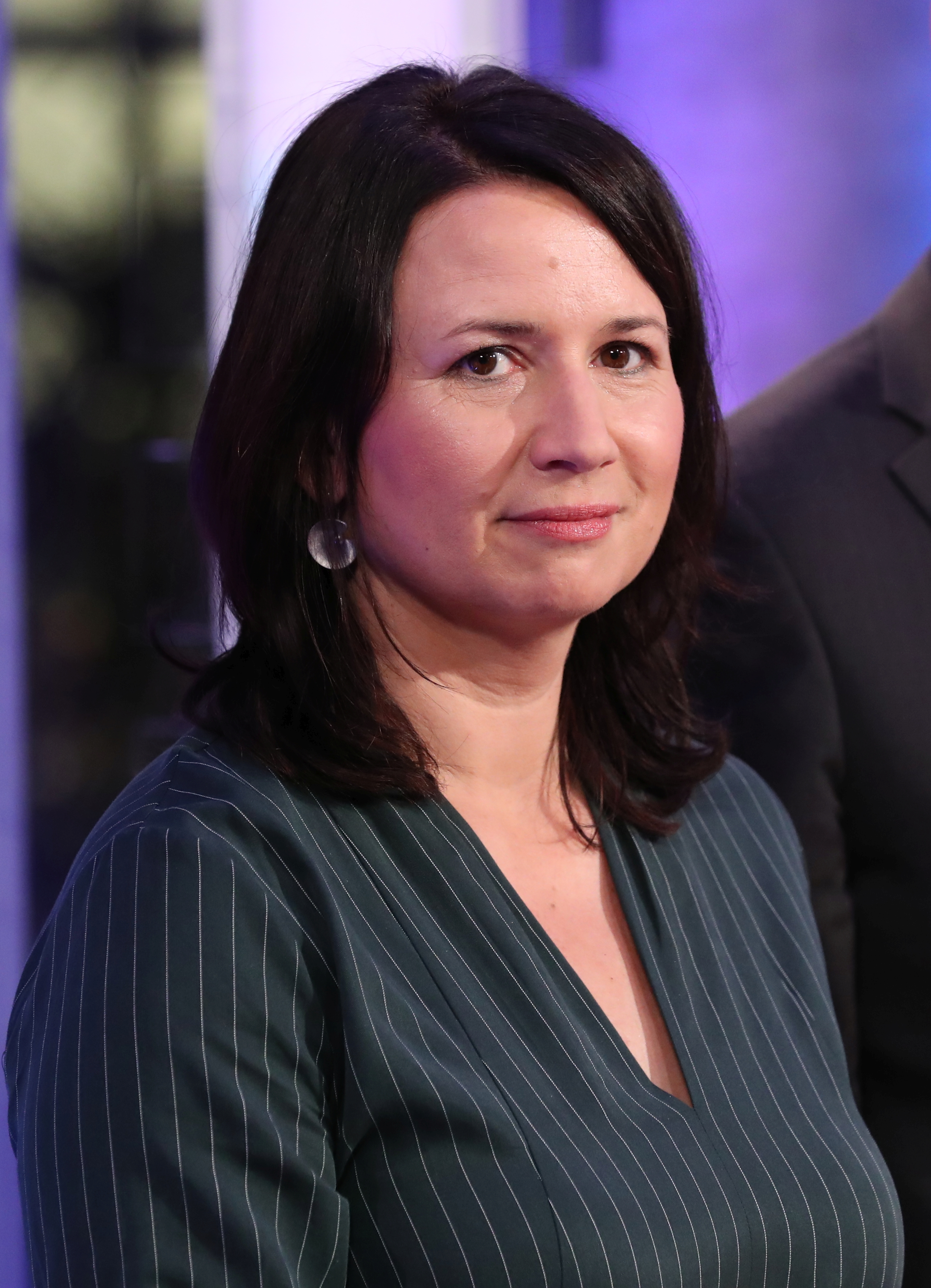
- Siegesmund in 2019

Second Deputy Minister-President of Thuringia
- In office 4 March 2020 – 31 January 2023
- Succeeded by: Bernhard Stengele

Minister for the Environment, Energy and Nature Conservation of Thuringia
- In office 4 March 2020 – 31 January 2023
- Preceded by: Vacant
- Succeeded by: Bernhard Stengele
- In office 5 December 2014 – 5 February 2020
- Preceded by: Jürgen Reinholz
- Succeeded by: Vacant

Leader of Alliance 90/The Greens in the Landtag of Thuringia
- In office 30 August 2009 – 10 December 2014
- Succeeded by: Dirk Adams

Member of the Landtag of Thuringia
- In office 27 October 2019 – 17 March 2020
- Succeeded by: Laura Wahl
- Constituency: Party list
- In office 30 August 2009 – 15 October 2015
- Succeeded by: Olaf Müller
- Constituency: Party list

Member of the Jena City Council
- Incumbent
- Assumed office 26 May 2019

Personal details
- Born: Anja Kaschta; 16 January 1977 (age 49) Gera, East Germany
- Party: Alliance 90/The Greens
- Children: 3

Anja Siegesmund (born 16 January 1977) is a German politician of Alliance 90/The Greens. Between 2014 and 2023, she served as Minister of the Environment in the state government of Thuringia in the coalition government of Bodo Ramelow. Until 31 January 2023, she was also Second Deputy Minister-President of Thuringia. From 2009 to 2014 she was leader of the Greens parliamentary group in the Landtag of Thuringia. She was a member of the Landtag from 2009 to 2015, then again from 2019 to 2020. In December 2022 she announced her imminent resignation from her political offices; on 1 February 2023 she was succeeded by Bernhard Stengele.

== Personal life and education ==
Siegesmund was born Anja Kaschta in Gera on 16 January 1977. She studied political science, German philology and psychology at the University of Jena and at the Louisiana State University in Baton Rouge, United States; she earned a degree as M.A. in 2002 in Jena. Siegesmund is married with three children.

== Political career ==
Siegesmund joined Alliance 90/The Greens in 2002, and from 2003 to 2008 was a consultant in the office of Bundestag deputy Katrin Göring-Eckardt. From 2004 to 2012 she was the spokeswoman of the Jena district association of the Greens.

In the 2009 state election, she was elected to the Landtag of Thuringia and became leader of the Greens parliamentary group. She was one of the Greens' two top candidates in the 2014 state election, alongside Dirk Adams, and was re-elected to the Landtag. In December, she resigned as group leader to become Minister for Environment, Energy, and Nature Conservation in the first Ramelow cabinet. She was one of two Greens ministers in cabinet, alongside Dieter Lauinger. In 2015, she was given the additional portfolio of Second Deputy Minister-President. On 15 October 2015, citing separation between executive and legislature, she resigned from the Landtag.

In the 2019 Thuringian local elections, Siegesmund was elected to the city council of Jena.

Siegesmund again served alongside Dirk Adams as the Greens' top candidates in the 2019 state election, and was elected as the number one candidate on the party list. She ran as a candidate in the constituency Jena I and placed second with 24.7% of the vote, the best performance of any Greens candidate in the election.

Siegesmund left cabinet after the defeat of the government during the February 2020 Thuringian government crisis, but returned after Bodo Ramelow was re-elected in March. On 17 March, she again resigned her seat in the Landtag.

== Appearance in documentaries ==
- 2022: Wild Forests by David Cebulla
