= Ralf Plötner =

German politician (born 1983)

Member of the Landtag of Thuringia
- In office 26 November 2019 – 26 September 2024

Personal details
- Born: 1983 (age 42–43)
- Party: Die Linke (since 2007)

Ralf Plötner (born 1983) is a German politician serving as co-chairman of Die Linke in Thuringia since 2025. From 2019 to 2024, he was a member of the Landtag of Thuringia.
