= Christoph Zippel =

German politician (born 1982)

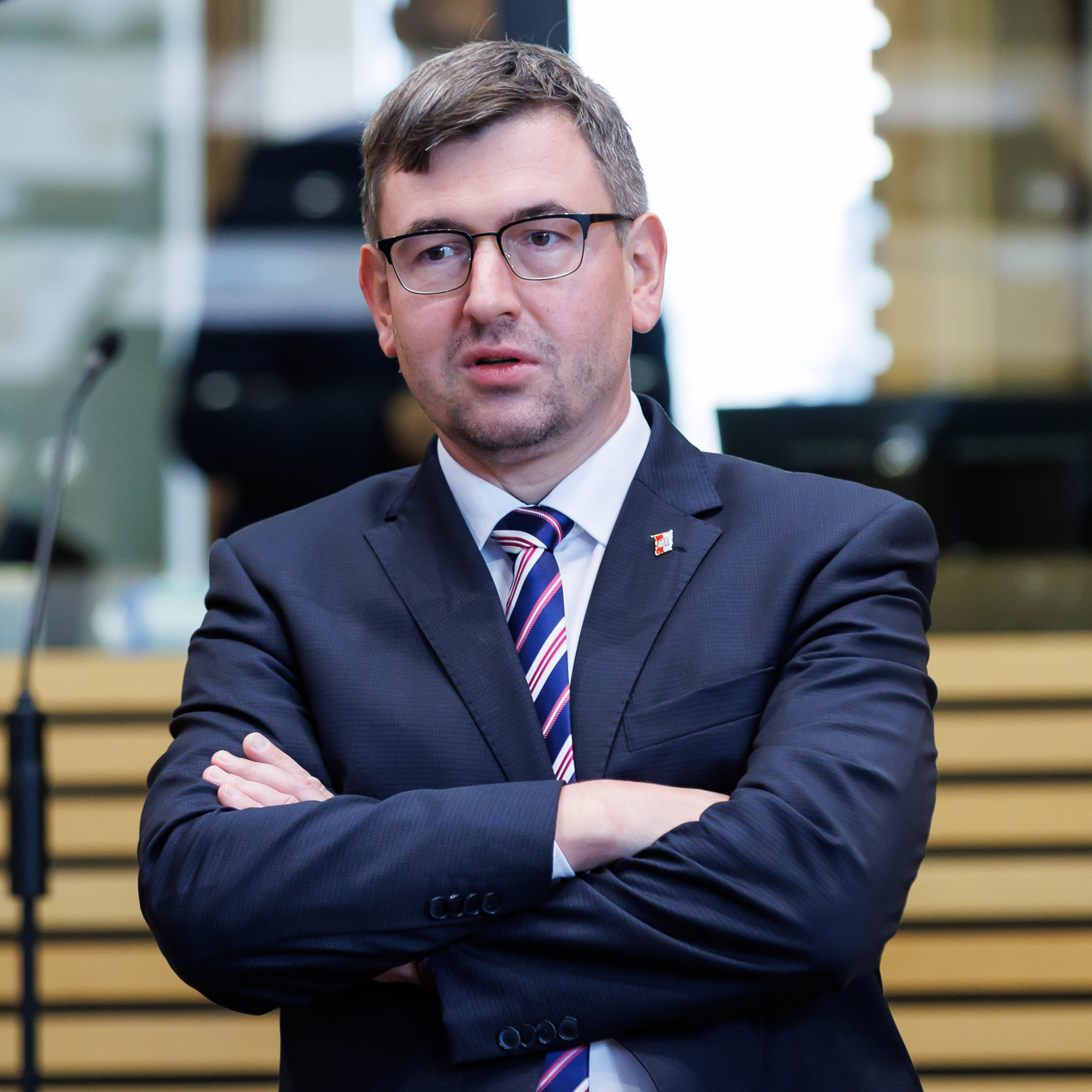
- Zippel in 2024

Member of the Landtag of Thuringia
- Incumbent
- Assumed office 14 October 2014
- Preceded by: Christian Gumprecht
- Constituency: Altenburger Land II (2014–2024)

Personal details
- Born: 17 December 1982 (age 43)
- Party: Christian Democratic Union (since 2001)

Christoph Zippel (born 17 December 1982) is a German politician serving as a member of the Landtag of Thuringia since 2014. He has served as chairman of the Christian Democratic Union in Altenburger Land since 2020.
