= Stadttheater Konstanz =

Theatre in Konstanz, Germany

Coordinates: 47°39′50″N 9°10′39″E

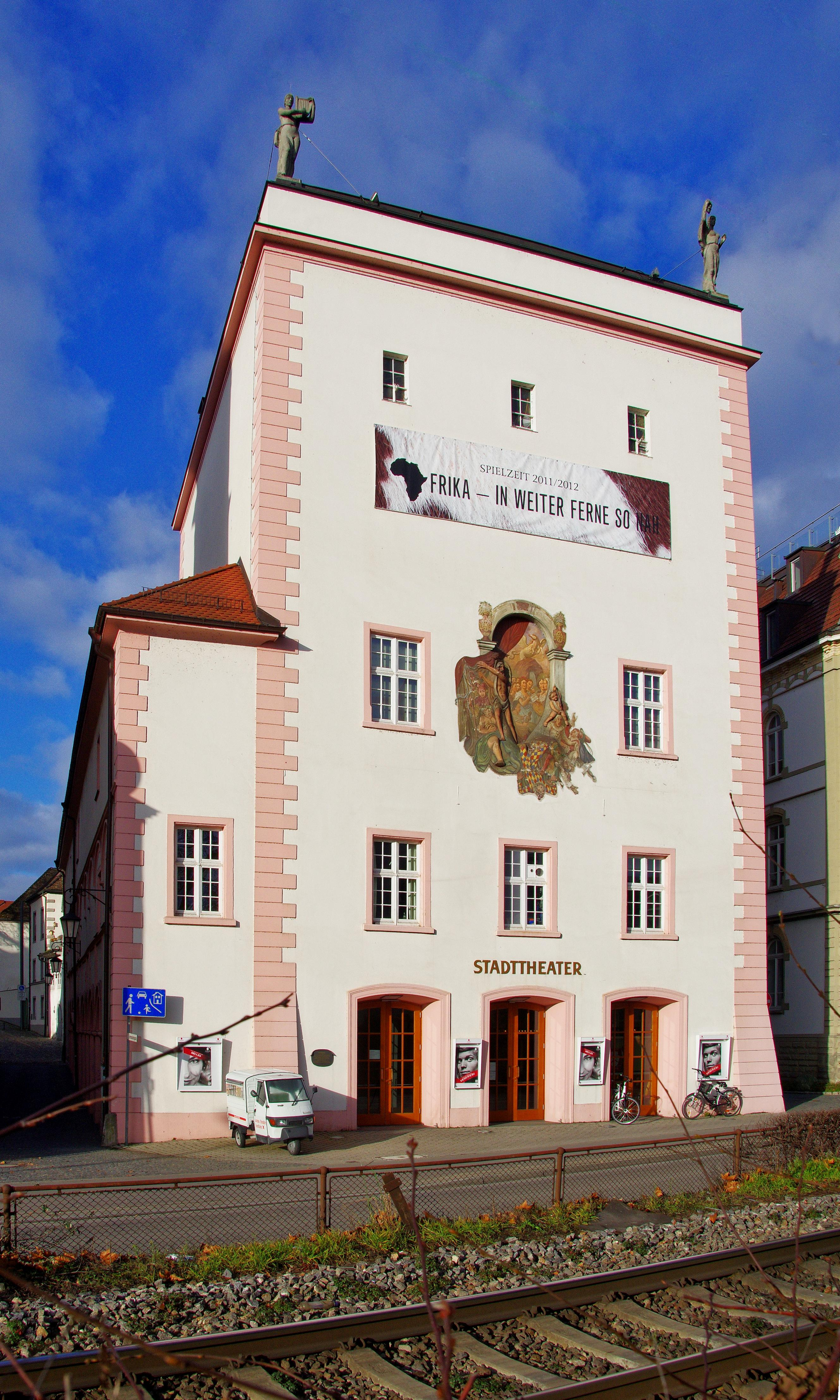
An image of Stadttheater Konstanz

Stadttheater Konstanz is a theatre in Konstanz, Baden-Württemberg, Germany, whose history dates from 1607. The theatre operates three venues, Municipal Theatre (Stadttheater), Workshop (Werkstatt) and Hall of Mirrors (Spiegelhalle).

== History ==
=== Prehistory ===
The municipal theatre building was built at the beginning of the 17th Century (1607–1609) as a grammar school, that was established by the Konstanz Jesuit monastery. It had an auditorium above, which was occasionally used for school theatre.

The beginning of theatre play in Constance began as a drama production that was created by Jesuit students about the life of Conrad of Constance in the courtyard of the Jesuit College on the occasion of the consecration of the Jesuit Church on 15 October 1607. The house is therefore described as the "longest continuously used stage in Europe". The theater advertises as “since 1607”, which puts it 34 years ahead of the Theater Ulm, which was founded in 1641 and was actually a professional theater even then.

=== Theatre History ===
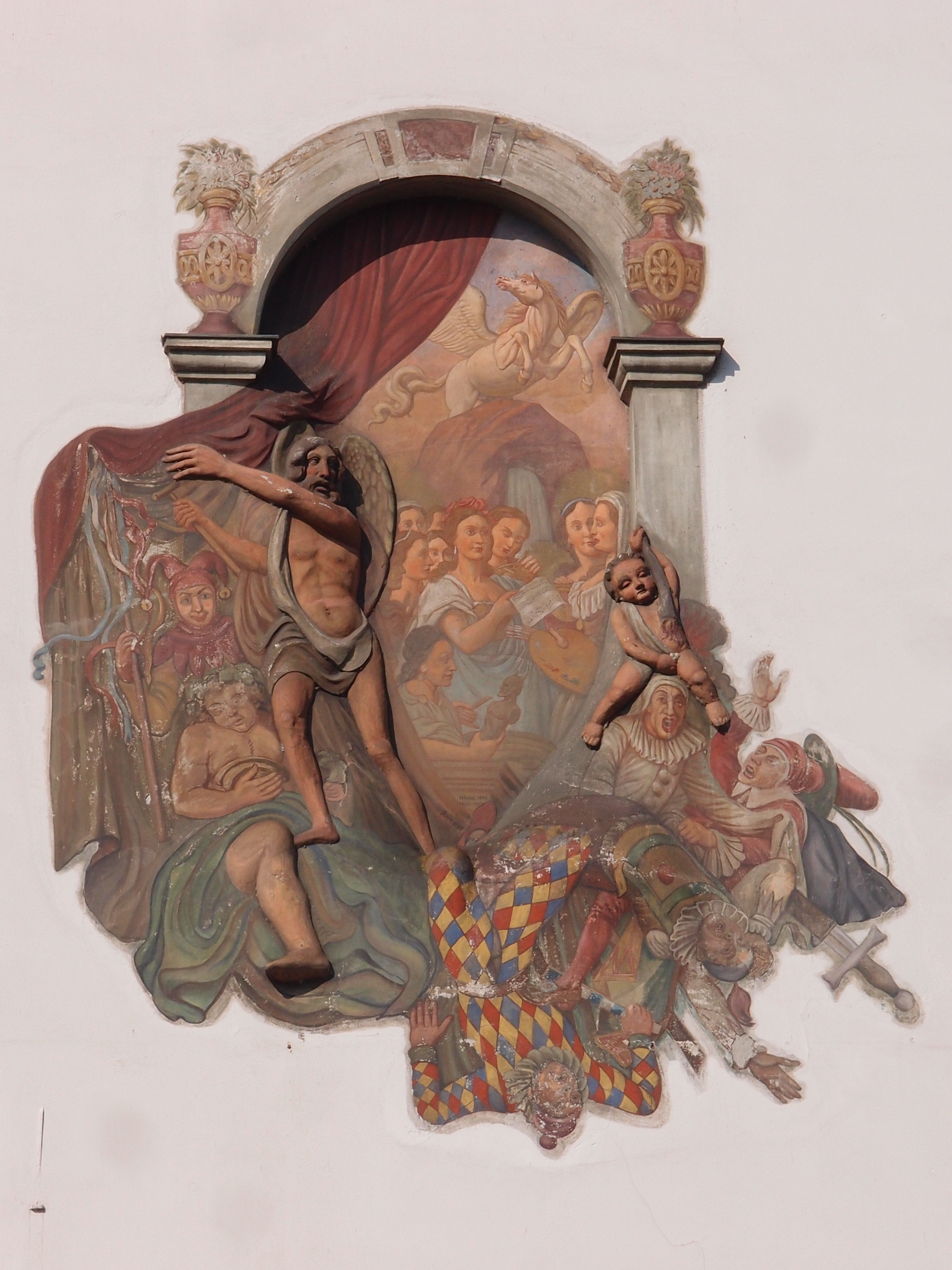
The Banishment of the Clown from the Theater", mural by F.X. Hermann at the Konstanz City Theater

In 1852, the building was converted into a theatre. In the 1930s, its exterior was also changed by the installation of a stage tower; the current shape of the auditorium was also created during this conversion.

After the Second World War, the theatre was re-established for the 1948–1949 season.

In April 1989, the decision was made to establish a children's and youth theatre section in the municipal theatre, and in May 1990 this was accomplished. The repertoire changed over time.

The repertoire changed over time. There were plays about church history and about Christian martyrs in the Jesuit era. Further comedies in the 18th century, plays about Napoleon and plays with happy endings in the 19th century. In the 1920s, comic plays and musical theatre were preferred. National socialist plays predominated during the Nazi period. Musical plays and performances calling for discussion have been offered by the city of Konstanz since it was commissioned in 1952.

== Venues ==
In addition to the actual municipal theatre building with 400 audience seats, the Theatre of Konstanz today also uses the "Spiegelhalle", a former goods hall at Konstanz's main railway station, for its productions, especially for experimental and young theatre (for up to 200 spectators). When it was converted into the "Spiegelhalle", a glazed foyer was added, which is used for smaller events. Before the move to the Spiegelhalle, the Young Theatre's performances took place in an old engine shed.

There is also a small studio stage in the theatre's administration and workshop building. This workshop stage seats up to 120 people. A figure and puppet theatre with up to seven productions per season was introduced on the workshop stage for the 2009–2010 season. The theatre's summer theatre is regularly staged on the other side of Lake Constance.

After the end of each season in July, the ensemble regularly gives guest performances with its summer theatre on the other side of Lake Constance: in the former Capuchin church in Überlingen (formerly in Meersburg). The theatre is located on the other side of Lake Constance.

== Figures ==
=== Visitor numbers ===
Between the late 1990s and the first years of the 21st, The stage showed an annual visitor average of 86,000 spectators. In the anniversary season 2006–2007, when the theatre was the host of the Baden-Württemberg Theater Days, a visitor record was achieved with more than 112,000 spectators. The 170 performances of the Young Theater accounted for 27,000 spectators.

=== Financing ===
The theatre budget was around six million euros in 2008, and the stage received 4.7 million euros in grants. Approximately one million of these grants come from the city of Konstanz, which was assigned by the state of Baden-Württemberg to the city of Konstanz. The entry result was 12.5% of the budget.

== Literature ==
- Abele, Sabine (1987). "Das Deutsche Theater in Konstanz 1948–1950". Schriften des Vereins für Geschichte des Bodensees und seiner Umgebung (in German). Göttingen: Verbundzentrale des GBV (VZG): 151–190.
- Bruder, David (2007). Leipold, Brigitte; Nix, Christoph (eds.). Hier wird gespielt! : 400 Jahre Theater Konstanz. Berlin: Theater der Zeit. ISBN 978-3-934344-98-3.
- Koch, Michael (1985). Theater in Konstanz : 1000 Jahre Theaterspiel. Konstanz: F. Stadler. ISBN 3-7977-0126-8.
