= 2019 Thuringian state election =

- 27 October 2019

All 90 seats of the Landtag of Thuringia 46 seats needed for a majority
- Registered: 1,729,242 ▼4.6%
- Turnout: 1,121,814 (64.9%) ▲12.2 pp
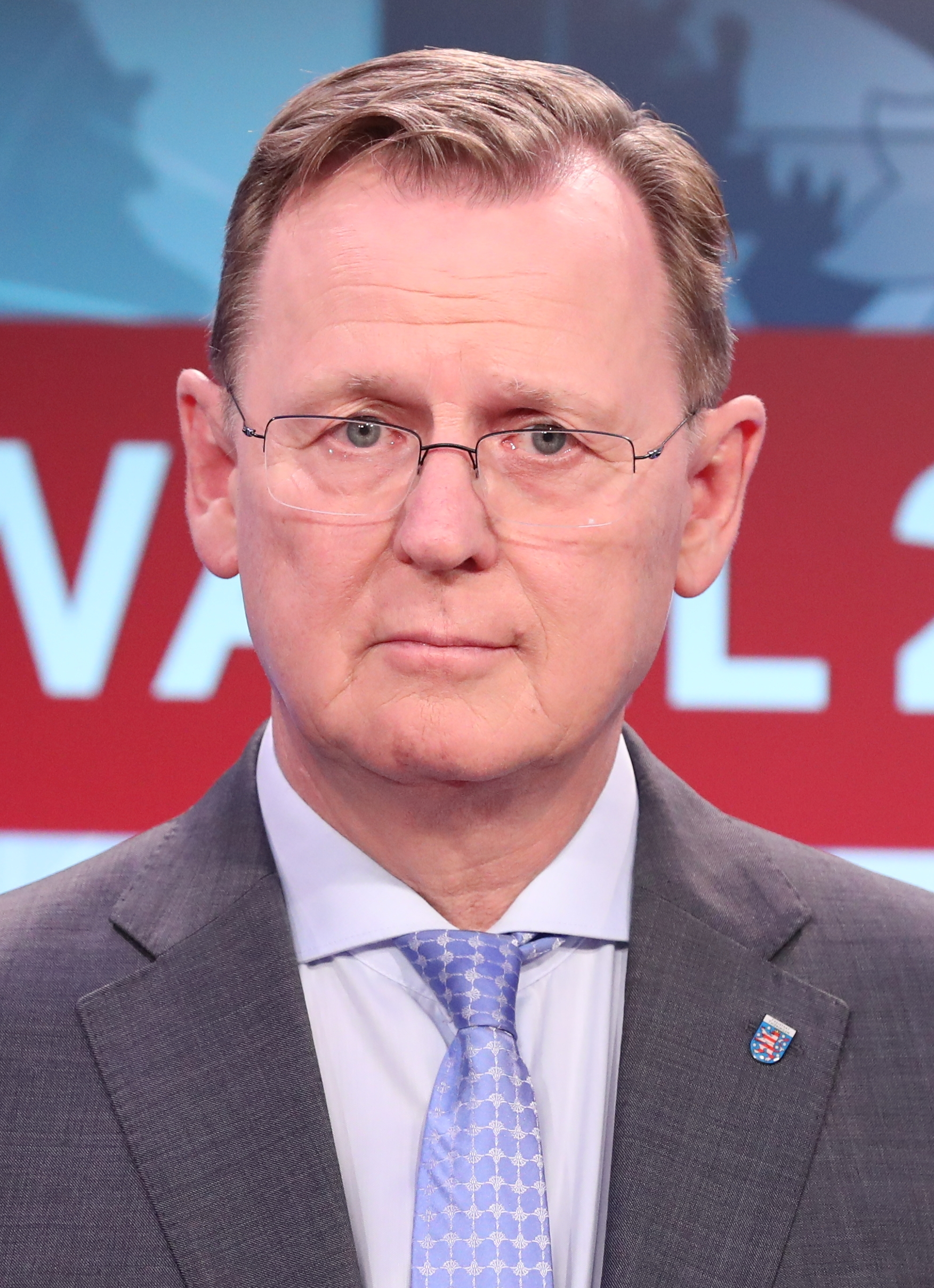

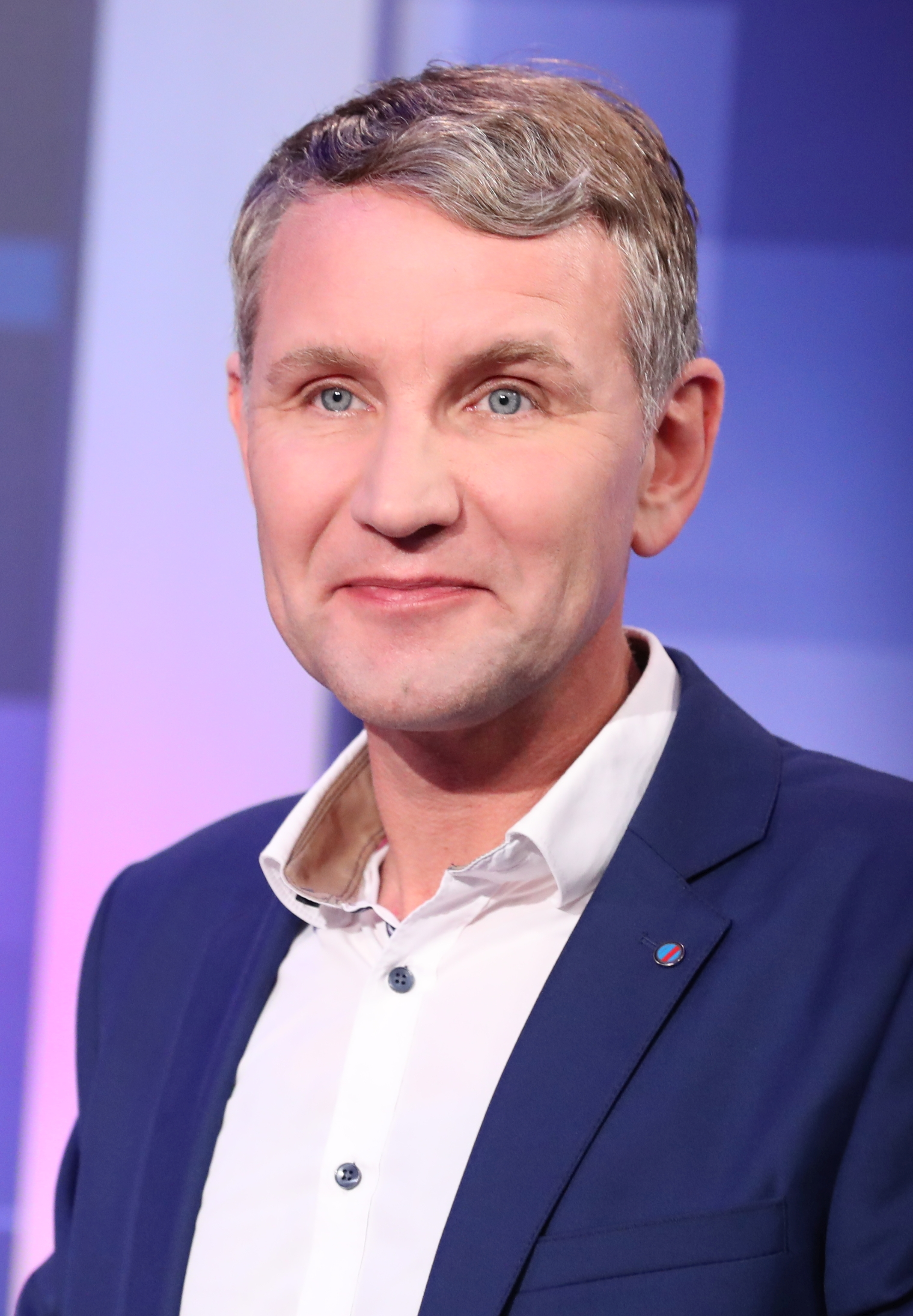

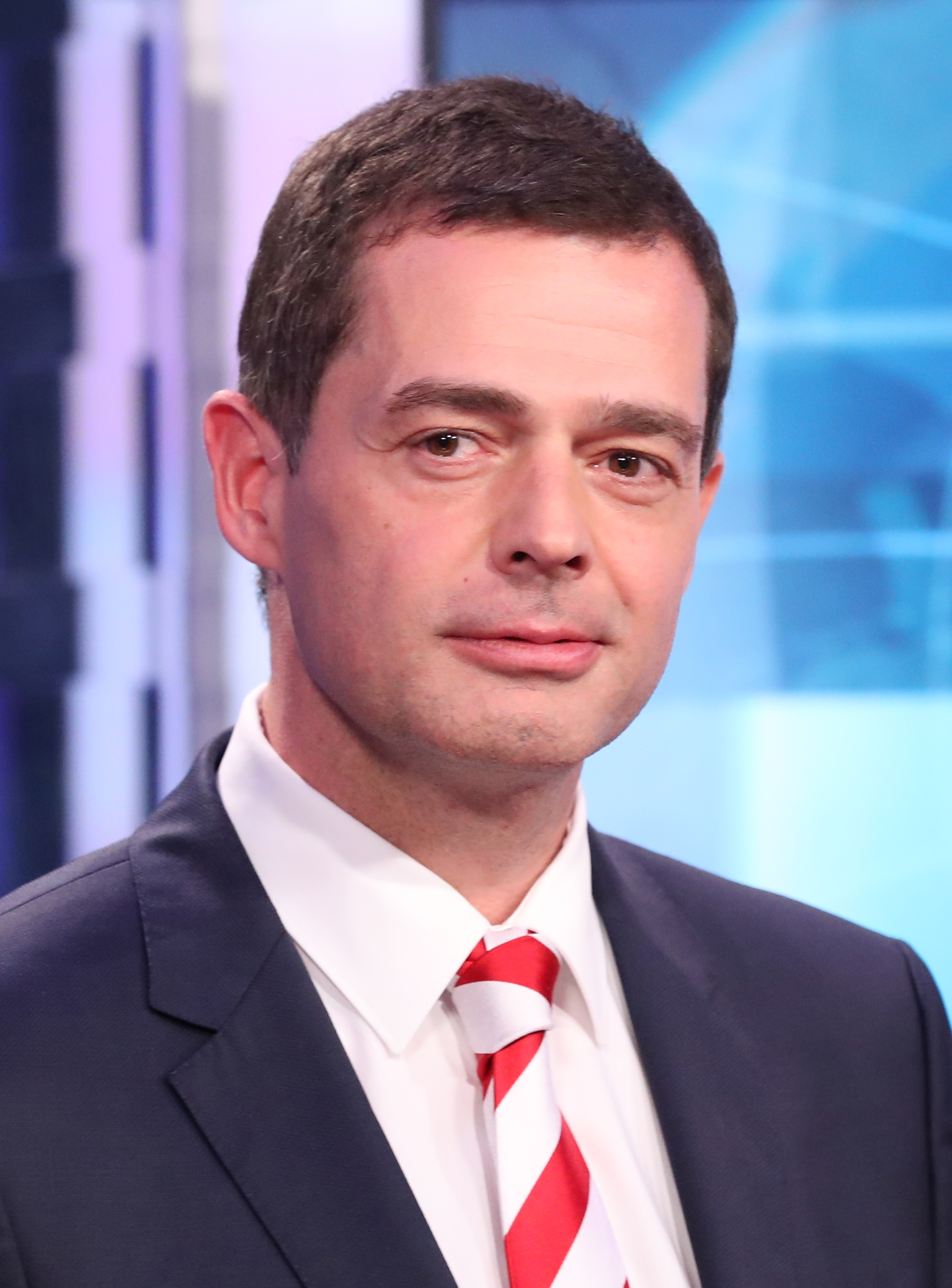

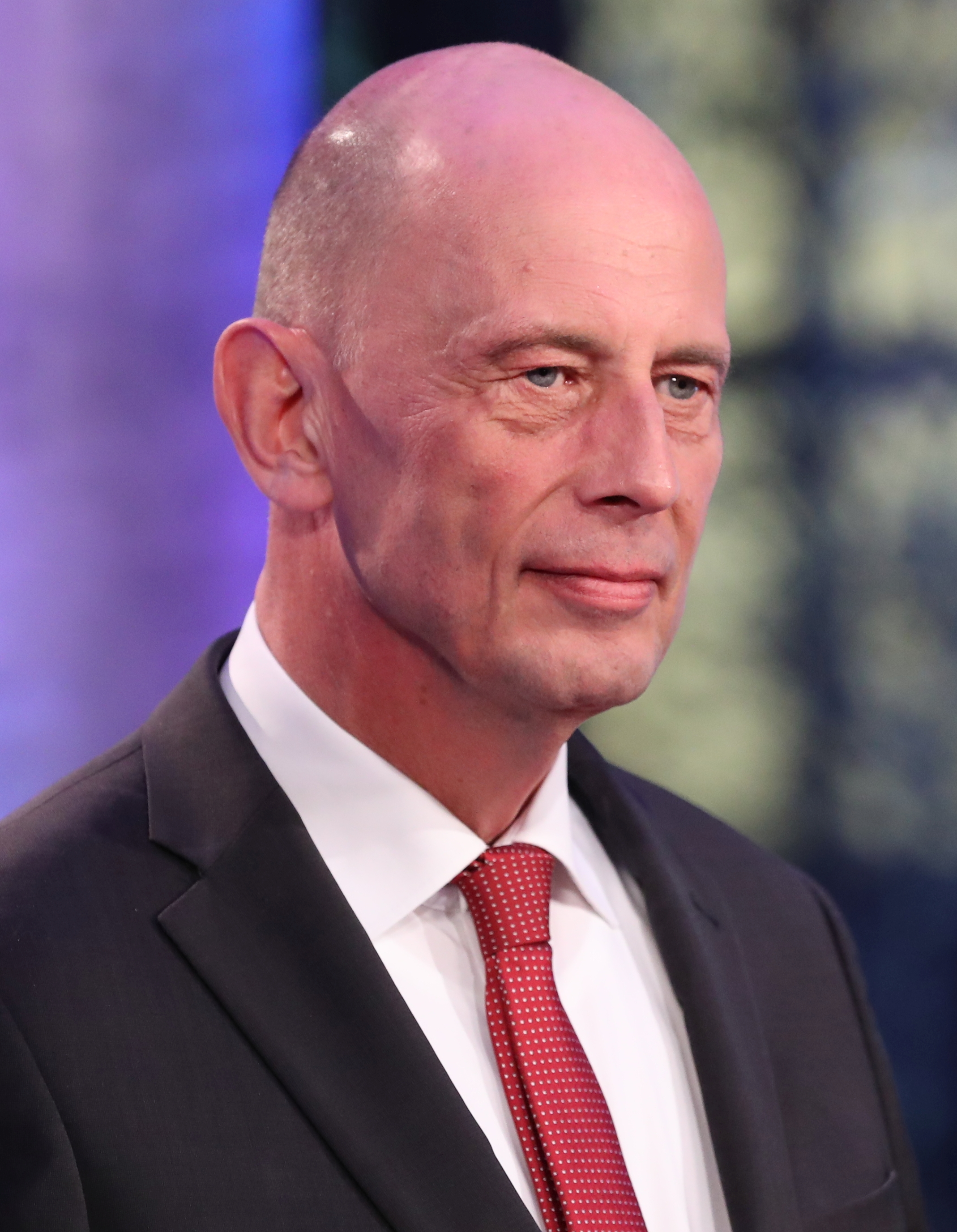

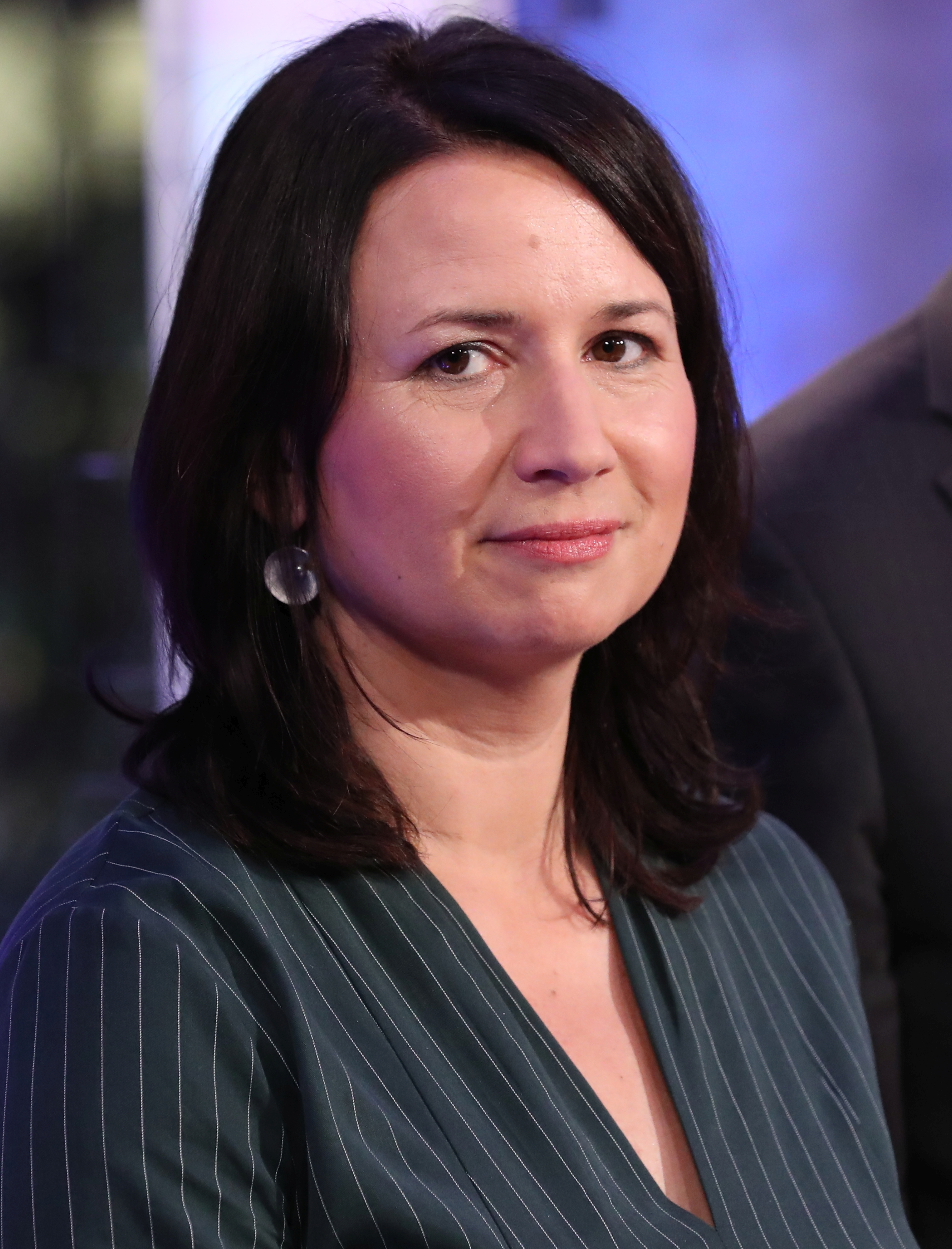

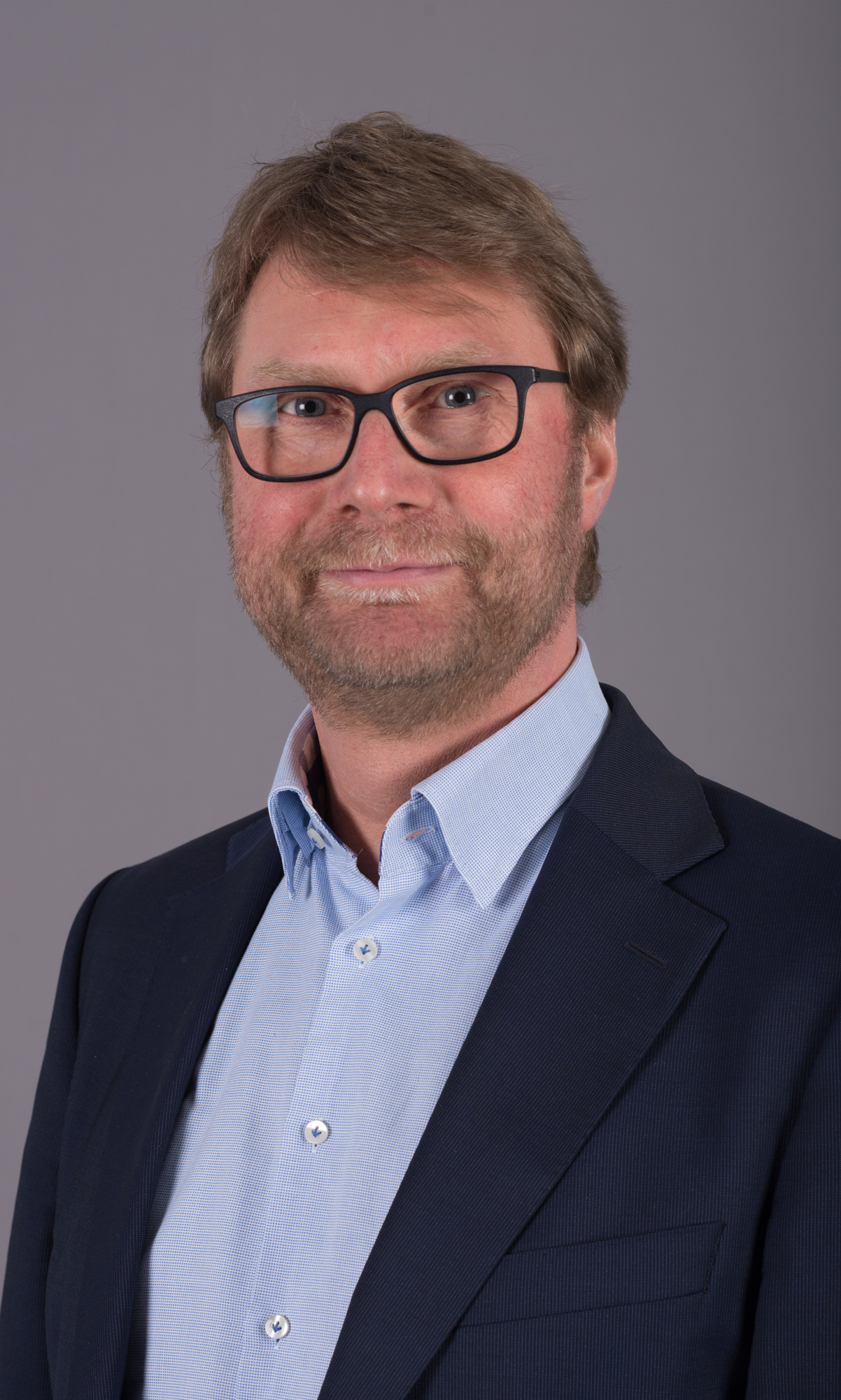

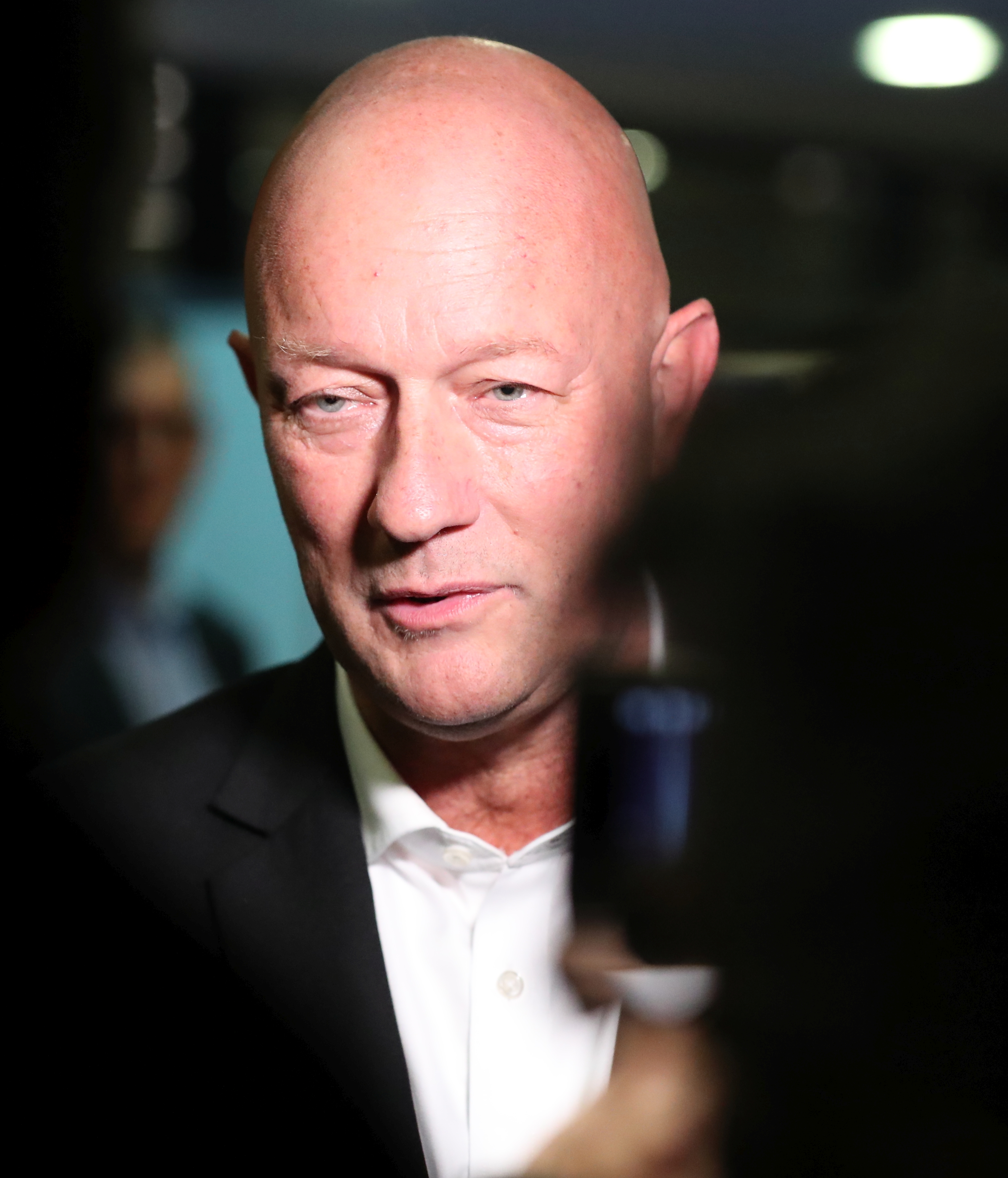
	First party	Second party	Third party
Leader	Bodo Ramelow	Björn Höcke	Mike Mohring
Party	Left	AfD	CDU
Last election	28 seats, 28.2%	11 seats, 10.6%	34 seats, 33.5%
Seats won	29	22	21
Seat change	▲1	▲11	▼13
Popular vote	343,780	259,382	241,049
Percentage	31.0%	23.4%	21.7%
Swing	▲2.8 pp	▲12.8 pp	▼11.8 pp
	Fourth party	Fifth party	Sixth party
Leader	Wolfgang Tiefensee	Anja Siegesmund & Dirk Adams	Thomas Kemmerich
Party	SPD	Greens	FDP
Last election	12 seats, 12.4%	6 seats, 5.7%	0 seats, 2.5%
Seats won	8	5	5
Seat change	▼4	▼1	▲5
Popular vote	90,987	57,474	55,493
Percentage	8.2%	5.2%	5.0%
Swing	▼4.2 pp	▼0.5 pp	▲2.5 pp
- Results for the single-member constituencies
Government before election
First Ramelow cabinet
Left–SPD–Green
Government after election
Second Ramelow cabinet
Left–SPD–Green

The 2019 Thuringian state election was held on 27 October 2019 to elect the members of the 7th Landtag of Thuringia. The outgoing government was a coalition consisting of The Left, the Social Democratic Party (SPD), and The Greens, led by Minister-President Bodo Ramelow.

The Left became the largest party for the first time in any German state with a small improvement to 31% of votes. The Alternative for Germany (AfD) more than doubled its vote share to 23%, overtaking the opposition Christian Democratic Union (CDU) to place second. The CDU suffered major losses, falling from 33% to 22%. The SPD also declined, while the Greens and Free Democratic Party (FDP) narrowly passed the 5% electoral threshold – the Greens retaining their seats, while the FDP re-entered the Landtag after falling out in 2014.

The election resulted in a hung parliament, as the previous governing coalition fell four seats short of an overall majority. No majority can be formed without the involvement of at least two of The Left, AfD, and CDU, all of whom explicitly ruled out cooperation with one another. As a result, no viable majority was considered to exist.

On 5 February 2020, the Landtag voted to elect the Minister-President. Incumbent Ramelow was expected to be re-elected to lead a minority government on the third ballot, which requires only a plurality to pass. The CDU declined to run a candidate, and neither the AfD's candidate nor FDP leader Thomas Kemmerich were expected to garner enough support to win. However, on the third ballot, Kemmerich was unexpectedly elected, winning 45 votes to incumbent Ramelow's 44. The votes for Kemmerich came from the FDP, CDU, and AfD, whose candidate, a fairly obscure local mayor, got no votes in the third round, all AfD MdLs tactically supporting Kemmerich. This was the first time the AfD had been involved in the election of a head of government in Germany, which triggered a political crisis and protests throughout Germany. Politicians nationwide criticised Kemmerich's election, including federal Chancellor Angela Merkel, who described it as "unforgivable".

Under intense pressure, Kemmerich announced his resignation just two days later but remained in office in a caretaker capacity until the Landtag could elect another Minister-President. On 4 March, a second vote was held, and Bodo Ramelow was re-elected as Minister-President with the abstentions of the CDU and FDP.

== Election date ==
According to § 18 of the Thuringian Electoral Law for the Landtag, the Landtag election must take place on a Sunday or public holiday at the earliest 57 months after the beginning of the current parliamentary term on 14 October 2014 and at the latest 61 months after, i.e. at the earliest 21 July 2019 and at the latest 10 November 2019. On 28 August 2018, the Thuringian Land government announced that the election was to take place on 27 October 2019.

== Opinion polls ==
=== Graphical summary ===
Local regression of polls conducted.

=== Party polling ===
Polling firm	Fieldwork date	Sample size	CDU	Linke	SPD	AfD	Grüne	NPD	FDP	Others	Lead
2019 state election	27 Oct 2019	–	21.7	31.0	8.2	23.4	5.2	0.5	5.0	4.9	7.6
Forschungsgruppe Wahlen	23–24 Oct 2019	1,177	26	28	9	21	7	–	5	4	2
Civey	25 Sep–23 Oct 2019	3,029	22.9	30.2	8.2	23.2	7.4	–	5.0	3.1	7.0
INSA	14–21 Oct 2019	1,010	24	28	9	24	8	–	5	2	4
Infratest dimap	14–16 Oct 2019	1,001	24	29	8	24	7	–	4	4	5
Forschungsgruppe Wahlen	14–16 Oct 2019	1,004	26	27	9	20	8	–	5	5	1
Civey	2–26 Sep 2019	3,035	24.2	25.3	8.4	22.3	9.2	–	5.0	5.8	1.1
INSA	16–23 Sep 2019	1,010	23	29	9	24	9	–	4	2	5
Infratest dimap	10–14 Sep 2019	1,001	22	28	7	25	8	–	5	5	3
INSA	12–19 Aug 2019	1,009	24	26	9	21	11	–	4	5	2
Infratest dimap	24–29 Jul 2019	1,001	21	25	8	24	11	–	5	6	1
INSA	18–24 Jun 2019	1,005	26	24	10	20	10	–	5	5	2
Civey	15 May–12 Jun 2019	2,981	26.5	20.8	9.6	22.5	10.1	–	5.2	5.3	4.0
2019 European election	26 May 2019	–	24.7	13.8	11.0	22.5	8.6	1.0	4.4	15.0	2.2
INSA	21–24 May 2019	1,029	26	25	11	20	8	–	5	5	1
INSA	11–22 Apr 2019	1,001	27	25	10	19	7	–	6	6	2
Civey	19 Mar–16 Apr 2019	1,320	28.6	24.3	11.0	19.5	7.3	–	4.9	4.4	4.3
INSA	19–25 Mar 2019	1,008	27	24	10	20	8	–	5	6	3
Infratest dimap	19–23 Mar 2019	1,005	28	24	11	20	8	–	5	4	4
INSA	22 Oct–17 Nov 2018	1,000	23	22	12	22	12	–	6	3	1
Infratest dimap	20–25 Aug 2018	1,000	30	22	10	23	6	–	5	4	7
INSA	29 May–1 Jun 2018	1,028	31	26	10	18	6	–	5	4	5
INSA	9–19 Feb 2018	1,267	32	24	10	18	7	–	5	4	8
INSA	9–13 Oct 2017	1,002	31	20	13	20	4	–	7	5	11
2017 federal election	24 Sep 2017	–	28.8	16.9	13.2	22.7	4.1	1.2	7.8	5.3	6.0
INSA	24–28 Jul 2017	1,007	37	22	11	18	4	–	5	3	15
Infratest dimap	12–17 Jun 2017	1,000	37	27	10	13	5	–	4	4	10
INSA	5–11 Apr 2017	1,005	33	22	15	19	5	–	4	2	11
INSA	15–25 Nov 2016	1,002	31	23	13	20	6	–	4	3	8
Infratest dimap	15–19 Nov 2016	1,000	32	23	12	21	6	–	3	3	9
INSA	17–21 Jun 2016	1,001	31.5	26	11.5	17.5	7	–	3.5	3	5.5
Infratest dimap	10–15 Jun 2016	1,701	32	25	11	19	7	–	–	6	7
INSA	4–12 Apr 2016	1,000	31	26.5	13	15	8.5	–	4	2	4.5
INSA	4–11 Jan 2016	1,002	33.5	27	14.5	13.5	7	–	–	4.5	6.5
INSA	7–12 Oct 2015	1,017	35.5	24.5	15.5	12	6.5	–	–	6	11
Infratest dimap	9–14 Sep 2015	1,000	35	27	13	9	7	4	–	5	8
INSA	1–6 Jul 2015	1,006	38	30	11	8	6	2	2	3	8
Infratest dimap	28 May–1 Jun 2015	1,002	34	27	14	8	7	3	2	5	7
INSA	23–27 Mar 2015	1,004	38	28	11	7	7	–	3	6	10
INSA	26 Jan–2 Feb 2015	1,000	40	29	11	10	6	–	–	4	11
2014 state election	14 Sep 2014	–	33.5	28.2	12.4	10.6	5.7	3.6	2.5	3.6	5.3

== Election result ==
Party	Constituency				Party list				Total seats	+/-	Seats %
Party	Votes	%	+/-	Seats	Votes	%	+/-	Seats	Total seats	+/-	Seats %
The Left (Die Linke)	283,589	25.8	▼3.6	11	343,780	31.0	▲2.8	18	29	▲1	32.2
Alternative for Germany (AfD)	242,221	22.0	▲19.8	11	259,382	23.4	▲12.8	11	22	▲11	24.4
Christian Democratic Union (CDU)	299,438	27.2	▼10.5	21	241,049	21.7	▼11.8	0	21	▼13	23.3
Social Democratic Party (SPD)	119,185	10.8	▼4.8	1	90,987	8.2	▼4.2	7	8	▼4	8.9
Alliance 90/The Greens (Grüne)	71,682	6.5	▲0.5	0	57,474	5.2	▼0.5	5	5	▼1	5.6
Free Democratic Party (FDP)	59,047	5.4	▲2.9	0	55,493	5.0	▲2.5	5	5	▲5	5.6
Die PARTEI (PARTEI)	–	–	0.0	–	12,524	1.1	▲0.5	0	0	±0	0
Tierschutz hier!	–	–		–	11,936	1.1	▲1.1	0	0	±0	0
National Democratic Party (NPD)	–	–	▼4.6	–	6,044	0.5	▼3.1	0	0	±0	0
Gray Panther	–	–		–	5,916	0.5	▲0.5	0	0	±0	0
Partei für Gesundheitsforschung	–	–	New	–	5,339	0.5	New	0	0	New	0
ÖDP / Familie	1,084	0.1	▲0.1	0	4,833	0.4	▲0.4	0	0	±0	0
Pirate Party Germany (Piraten)	436	0.0	▼0.4	0	4,044	0.4	▼0.6	0	0	±0	0
Marxist-Leninist Party of Germany (MLPD)	2,354	0.2	▲0.2	0	2,945	0.3	▲0.3	0	0	±0	0
Basic Income Alliance (BGE)	–	–	New	–	2,700	0.2	New	0	0	New	0
DIE DIREKTE!	–	–	New	–	2,362	0.2	New	0	0	New	0
Blaue #TeamPetry Thüringen	–	–	New	–	856	0.1	New	0	0	New	0
Communist Party of Germany (KPD)	–	–		–	724	0.1	▲0.1	0	0	±0	0
Other	21,004	1.9		0	–	–	–	–	0	±0	0
Valid votes	1,100,040	98.0			1,108,388	98.8					
Blank and invalid votes	21,774	2.0			13,426	1.2					
Total	1,121,814	100.0		44	1,121,814	100.0		46	90	▼1	
Electorate/voter turnout	1,729,242	64.9	▲12.2		1,729,242	64.9	▲12.2				
Source: Thüringer Landesamt für Statistik

The Left became the strongest party in a state election for the first time since German reunification. The FDP won seats in an eastern state parliament for the first time since the 2009 Brandenburg state election. Whether the FDP would pass the 5% electoral threshold was unclear for much of election night, but the preliminary results showed them entering the Landtag by a margin of just six votes. This increased to 73 votes in the final results announced on 7 November.

The AfD doubled its performance from 10.6% and 11 seats to 23.4% and 22 seats. The CDU, which had been the largest party in Thuringia since the state's first election in 1990 and had governed uninterrupted until 2014, suffered its worst ever result. It lost more than 11 percentage points and fell to third place, winning just 22.5% of the vote; clearly missing its goal of returning to the head of the Thuringian government. The Greens' federal co-leader Annalena Baerbock said she was disappointed with her party's performance, an anomaly among a string of record-breaking results achieved by the party since late 2018, and that the election reinforced the need to invest more time and energy in civil society in eastern Germany. She stated she was "devastated" by the huge gains made by the AfD, referring to the party as "fascistic". The AfD was described as such at various times in the aftermath of the election by both participants and observers. This was particularly true of their state leader Björn Höcke due to his comments and publications, as well as a recent court ruling which stated that the description of Höcke as a fascist "rests on verifiable fact".

== Government formation ==
The red-red-green coalition of The Left, the SPD, and The Greens which previously governed the state lost their majority in the legislature, and are a total of four seats short. The CDU ruled out cooperation with the Left, and all parties ruled out any cooperation with AfD.

An open letter published on 5 November, signed by 17 state CDU members, caused controversy. The letter urged the CDU to hold discussions with "all democratically elected parties" in the Landtag before ruling out any coalition partnerships, and was criticized by members of the national CDU and other parties, who interpreted it as a veiled call to work with AfD. Earlier in the week, deputy state party leader Michael Heym also publicly suggested exploring the possibility of a CDU–AfD–FDP coalition.

The result provided for two possible majority governments not including AfD: a Left–CDU coalition (also potentially including the SPD and/or Greens), or a Left–SPD–Green–FDP coalition. The former would be ideologically unwieldy but command a stable majority, while the latter had only been tried on local level, and would only hold a slim majority of two seats. Both were considered infeasible due to ideological differences and pledges made by both the CDU and FDP not to work with The Left. Minister-President Ramelow invited CDU leader Mohring to formal exploratory talks during the week of 4 November, but withdrew the invitation on 9 November, claiming Mohring had violated discretion by publicly displaying text messages between them. At the same time, CDU state secretary general Raymond Walk reiterated his party's rejection of any partnership with the Left.

=== Election of Kemmerich ===
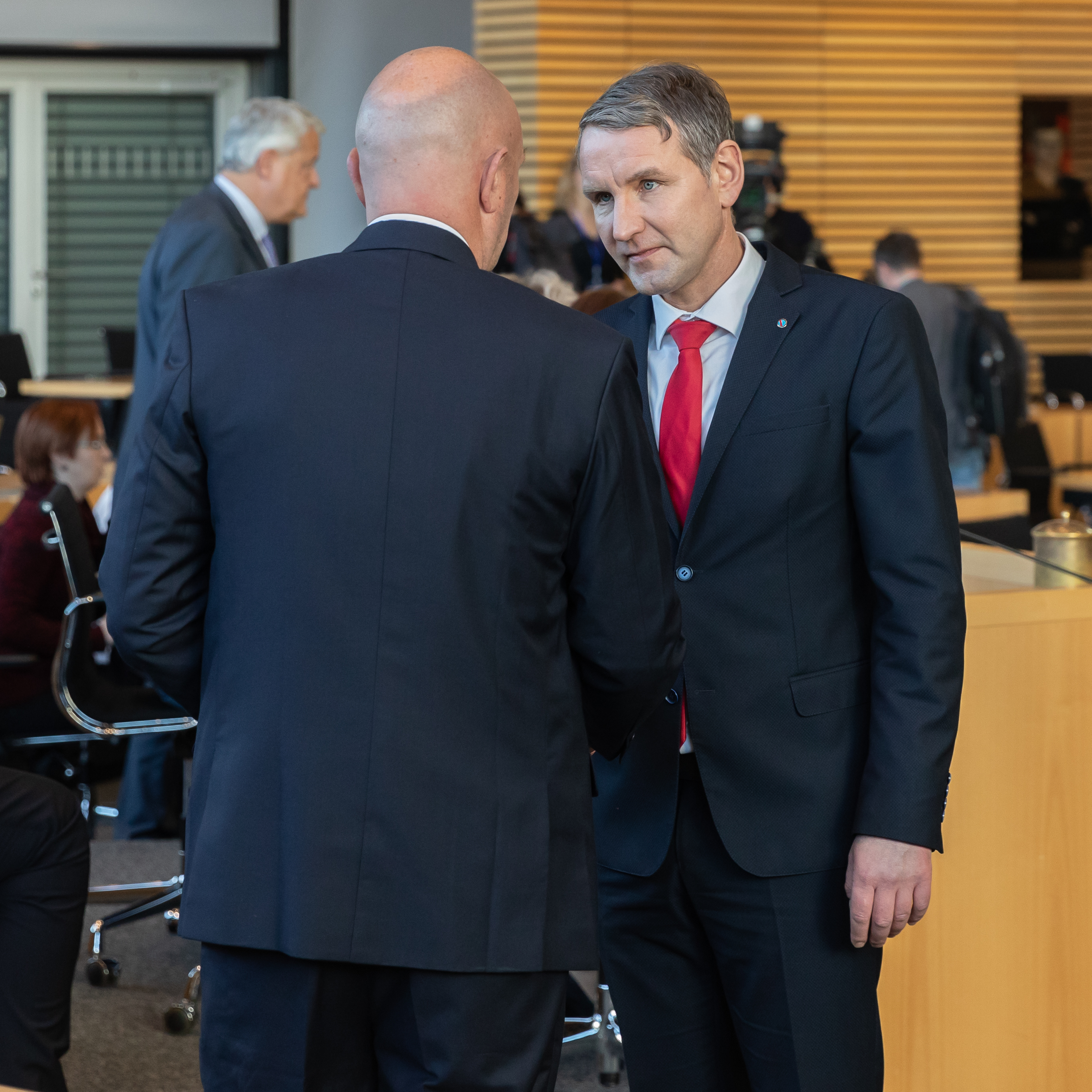
AfD Leader Björn Höcke congratulates Thomas Kemmerich on his election, during the 2020 Thuringian government crisis,

After the breakdown of coalition talks, Ramelow announced his intention to continue leading a red-red-green minority government. At the opening of parliament on 5 February 2020, Ramelow stood for election as Minister-President, while the AfD nominated independent local mayor Christoph Kindervater. The election process involves two ballots in which a candidate requires an absolute majority (46 affirmative votes) to be elected, after which a third and final ballot requires only a plurality. FDP leader Thomas Kemmerich announced he would also stand on this third ballot if one were held. Ramelow received 43 votes on the first ballot and 44 on the second, short of a majority. Kindervater received 25 votes on the first ballot and 22 on the second. The FDP and CDU abstained from both the first and second ballots. Kemmerich entered the contest on the third ballot. He received the support of the CDU, FDP, and AfD, being elected with 45 votes, while Ramelow received 44.

Minister-President election
Ballot →	5 February 2020		
Required majority →	46 out of 90	46 out of 90	Plurality
Bodo Ramelow	43 / 90	44 / 90	44 / 90
Christoph Kindervater	25 / 90	22 / 90	0 / 90
Thomas Kemmerich	Did not run	Did not run	45 / 90
Abstentions	22 / 90	24 / 90	1 / 90

This was highly unexpected, as neither the CDU or AfD had publicly expressed any intention to support Kemmerich. The CDU was expected to abstain on the third ballot as it did on the first two. The AfD did not withdraw their candidate Kindervater on the third ballot; he stood, but received no votes.

This marked the first time a state head of government had been elected with the support of the AfD. The leftist parties as well as some within the federal FDP sharply criticized the CDU for breaking the cordon sanitaire surrounding the AfD. Previously, there had been a general agreement among all other parties that the AfD should be denied any influence in government, and should not be negotiated nor worked with on any level. The apparent cooperation between the three parties in Thuringia was viewed as having broken this agreement. CDU leader Mohring stated that his party supported Kemmerich as a centrist compromise candidate, reiterated that they would not work with AfD, and called on Kemmerich to make clear the AfD would not be invited into any governing coalition, though this would also leave Kemmerich with no workable bloc with which to govern. The Left and Greens immediately ruled out working with Kemmerich, and called for new elections.

Outgoing Minister-President Ramelow drew parallels between AfD's role in Kemmerich's election and the rise of the Nazi Party. Protests were held in several German cities after the election, including in the Thuringian capital of Erfurt, where 1,000 protestors demonstrated outside the Landtag as Kemmerich delivered his acceptance speech. Federal SPD leaders Norbert Walter-Borjans and Saskia Esken stated they would withdraw their party from the federal CDU–SPD government if Kemmerich did not resign immediately.

Federal CDU leader Annegret Kramp-Karrenbauer criticized the state CDU for "[acting] against the wishes" of the federal party, and raised the possibility of new elections as the "cleanest" way to break the deadlock. In a later statement on Twitter, she asked state CDU legislators to abstain from participating in a Kemmerich cabinet and directly called for new elections. Federal Chancellor Angela Merkel, on a state visit to South Africa when the vote took place, condemned it in a statement: "It was a bad day for democracy, a day that broke with the long and proud tradition of the CDU's values. This is in no way in line with what the CDU thinks, how we have acted throughout our party's existence." Christian Hirte, federal commissioner for the new states of Germany, was dismissed from cabinet after tweeting his congratulations to Kemmerich after the election.

A letter sent to Kemmerich by AfD leader Björn Höcke shortly after the 2019 election led to speculation that AfD's support for Kemmerich was planned and coordinated. In the letter, Höcke offered AfD support for either a non-partisan technocratic government or an FDP minority government. Despite this, Kemmerich and his party denied having any knowledge of AfD's intentions.

On 8 February, Kemmerich announced his resignation and stated his support for new elections. According to state law, a motion to dissolve parliament and call snap elections would require a one-third majority (30 votes) to come to the floor and a two-thirds majority (60 votes) to pass; a vote of confidence on the Minister-President would require 46 votes to pass or result in a new Minister-President election upon failure. Despite his resignation, Kemmerich remained in office in a caretaker capacity until the Landtag could hold a new election for Minister-President.

=== Election of Ramelow ===
The Left and CDU held talks on 17 February, seeking to resolve the crisis. Bodo Ramelow suggested that former CDU Minister-President Christine Lieberknecht lead a three-member transitional cabinet which would serve until a new election was held, which he suggested should take place 70 days later. The CDU rejected this prospect, stating that a full cabinet should take office and that a state budget should be passed before new elections are held.

Following further discussions, The Left, CDU, SPD, and Greens announced on 21 February 2020 that they had reached an agreement to hold a new election for Minister-President on 4 March 2020, and a new state election on 25 April 2021. The four parties stated they would support Bodo Ramelow for Minister-President, and that he should lead an interim government for the next 13 months until the election is held. This government would comprise the same red-red-green arrangement which governed Thuringia from 2014 to February 2020 and had to pass a budget together with the CDU, before the new election would be called by dissolving the parliament. Between them, the four parties held 63 of the 90 seats in the Landtag (70%), more than the two-thirds required to dissolve the Landtag and trigger an early election.

On 2 March, Björn Höcke announced his candidacy for Minister-President in the upcoming vote. In response, an FDP spokesperson said that the FDP may not attend the vote, stating: "We reject both candidates and also don't wish to abstain. In which case our only remaining possibility is to not being physically present at the election." The leadership of the Young Union, the youth branch of the CDU, also announced its opposition to CDU support for either candidate. However, the Thuringia CDU stated it intended to be present at the vote.

On 4 March, Bodo Ramelow, who had changed his mind and had declared in the morning that the CDU should better abstain instead of supporting him, making the vote easier for them, was elected Minister-President by the Landtag after three rounds of voting. In the first two rounds, The Left, SPD, and Greens voted for Ramelow, while AfD voted for Höcke, the CDU abstained, and the FDP did not vote or abstain. In the third round, Höcke withdrew, and Ramelow was elected with 43 in favour, 23 against, and 20 abstentions.

Minister-President election
Ballot →	4 March 2020		
Required majority →	46 out of 90	46 out of 90	Plurality
Bodo Ramelow	42 / 90	42 / 90	42 / 90
Björn Höcke	22 / 90	22 / 90	Did not run
Against	N/A		23 / 90
Abstentions	26 / 90	26 / 90	20 / 90
