= Jena II =

Electoral constituency in Thuringia, Germany

Jena II is an electoral constituency (German: Wahlkreis) represented in the Landtag of Thuringia. It elects one member via first-past-the-post voting. Under the current constituency numbering system, it is designated as constituency 38. It covers the eastern part of Jena.

Jena I was created for the 1994 state election. Since 2009, it has been represented by Lena Saniye Güngör of The Left.

== Geography ==
As of the 2019 state election, Jena II covers the eastern part of Jena, specifically the city districts (Ortsteile) of Drackendorf, Ilmnitz, Jenaprießnitz/Wogau, Kernberge, Kunitz/Laasan, Lobeda-Altstadt, Löbstedt, Neulobeda, Wenigenjena, Wöllnitz, Ziegenhain, and Zwätzen.

== Members ==
The constituency was first won by the Social Democratic Party (SPD) in 1994, and represented by Gerd Schuchardt. It was won by the Christian Democratic Union (CDU) and in 1999 and represented by Andreas Trautvetter, who was re-elected in 2004. In 2009, the constituency was won by Gudrun Lukin of The Left. She was re-elected in 2014 and 2019. In 2024, Lena Saniye Güngör held the seat for The Left.

Election	Member	Party	%
1994	Gerd Schuchardt	SPD	40.1
1999	Andreas Trautvetter	CDU	36.2
2004	Andreas Trautvetter	CDU	32.8
2009	Gudrun Lukin	LINKE	28.9
2014	Gudrun Lukin	LINKE	34.3
2019	Gudrun Lukin	LINKE	32.3
2024	Lena Saniye Güngör	LINKE	25.1

== Election results ==
=== 2024 election ===
State election (2024): Jena II
Notes:	Blue background denotes the winner of the electorate vote. Pink background denotes a candidate elected from their party list. Yellow background denotes an electorate win by a list member, or other incumbent. A ✓ or ✗ denotes status of any incumbent, win or lose respectively.						
Party	Candidate	Votes	%	±%	Party votes	%	±%
Left	Lena Saniye Güngör	6,585	25.1	▼7.2	5,191	19.7	▼17.9
CDU	Konstantin Freuer	5,979	22.8	▲4.9	5,659	21.4	▲7.2
AfD	Tim Egon Beutler	5,071	19.3	▲4.4	4,945	18.7	▲4.1
BSW	Patrizia Hertlein	3,360	12.8		4,052	15.4	
SPD	Lutz Liebscher	2,957	11.3	▲2.3	2,712	10.3	▲1.3
Greens	Wolfgang Volkmer	1,569	6.0	▼7.8	2,487	9.4	▼2.3
FDP	Stefan Beyer	748	2.8	▼11.0	417	1.6	▼10.1
FW					235	0.9	
APT					211	0.8	▲0.1
Pirates					119	0.5	▲0.1
BD					108	0.4	
Values					108	0.4	
Familie					81	0.3	
ÖDP					45	0.2	▼0.2
MLPD					23	0.1	▼0.1
Informal votes		260			136		
Total valid votes		26,269			26,393		
Turnout		26,529	76.6	▲7.6			
Left hold	Majority	606	2.3	▼12.1			

=== 2019 election ===
State election (2019): Jena II
Notes:	Blue background denotes the winner of the electorate vote. Pink background denotes a candidate elected from their party list. Yellow background denotes an electorate win by a list member, or other incumbent. A ✓ or ✗ denotes status of any incumbent, win or lose respectively.						
Party	Candidate	Votes	%	±%	Party votes	%	±%
Left	✓ Gudrun Lukin	7,885	32.3	▼2.0	9,215	37.6	▲6.0
CDU	Rosa Maria Haschke	4,376	17.9	▼15.1	3,488	14.2	▼13.3
AfD	Tosca Kniese	3,642	14.9		3,587	14.6	▲5.4
Greens	Kathleen Lützkendorf	3,382	13.8	▲4.2	2,859	11.7	▲0.3
FDP	Ute Bergner	2,537	10.4	▲6.2	1,490	7.9	▲4.3
SPD	Lutz Liebscher	2,203	9.0	▼7.3	2,193	9.0	▼2.9
Free Voters	Günter Brinkmann	213	0.9				
Independent	Michael Bruner	131	0.5				
MLPD	Anatole Braungart	56	0.2		49	0.2	
List-only parties					1,613	6.6	
Informal votes		263			194		
Total valid votes		24,425			24,494		
Turnout		24,688	69.0	▲12.9			
Left hold	Majority	3,509	14.4	▲13.1			

=== 2014 election ===
State election (2014): Jena II
Notes:	Blue background denotes the winner of the electorate vote. Pink background denotes a candidate elected from their party list. Yellow background denotes an electorate win by a list member, or other incumbent. A ✓ or ✗ denotes status of any incumbent, win or lose respectively.						
Party	Candidate	Votes	%	±%	Party votes	%	±%
Left	✓ Gudrun Lukin	6,464	34.3	▲5.4	6,007	31.6	▲4.0
CDU	Dietmar Schuchardt	6,210	33.0	▲11.5	5,141	27.1	▲4.2
SPD	Jörg Vogel	3,073	16.3	▼8.4	2,269	11.9	▼11.0
Greens	Olaf Müller	1,814	9.6	▲0.2	2,164	11.4	0.0
AfD					1,741	9.2	
FDP	Thomas Nitzsche	785	4.2	▼4.2	686	3.6	▼4.9
NPD	Dietmar Hafenrichter	476	2.5	▼0.2	241	1.3	▼1.1
List-only parties					753	4.0	
Informal votes		336			156		
Total valid votes		18,822			19,002		
Turnout		19,158	56.1	▼1.9			
Left hold	Majority	254	1.3	▼2.9			

=== 2009 election ===
State election (2009): Jena II
Notes:	Blue background denotes the winner of the electorate vote. Pink background denotes a candidate elected from their party list. Yellow background denotes an electorate win by a list member, or other incumbent. A ✓ or ✗ denotes status of any incumbent, win or lose respectively.						
Party	Candidate	Votes	%	±%	Party votes	%	±%
Left	Gudrun Lukin	5,740	28.9	▼0.3	5,497	27.6	0.0
SPD	Jörg Vogel	4,909	24.7	▼1.8	4,564	22.9	▲4.0
CDU	Bernward Müller	4,271	21.5	▼11.3	4,575	22.9	▼8.8
Greens	Pierre Georg	1,861	9.4	▲2.8	2,270	11.4	▲1.4
FDP	Andreas Wiese	1,664	8.4	▲3.6	1,700	8.5	▲4.3
Free Voters	Norbert Plandor	901	4.5		660	3.3	▲1.7
NPD	Hans-Jürgen Buhler	533	2.7		487	2.4	▲1.0
List-only parties					194	1.0	
Informal votes		340			272		
Total valid votes		19,879			19,947		
Turnout		20,219	58.0	▲1.1			
Left gain from CDU	Majority	831	4.2				

=== 2004 election ===
State election (2004): Jena II
Notes:	Blue background denotes the winner of the electorate vote. Pink background denotes a candidate elected from their party list. Yellow background denotes an electorate win by a list member, or other incumbent. A ✓ or ✗ denotes status of any incumbent, win or lose respectively.						
Party	Candidate	Votes	%	±%	Party votes	%	±%
CDU	✓ Andreas Trautvetter	6,229	32.8	▼3.4	6,083	31.7	▼8.5
PDS	Gudrun Lukin	5,540	29.2	▲5.0	5,297	27.6	▲1.9
SPD	Christoph Matschie	5,031	26.5	▼4.5	3,619	18.9	▼3.9
Greens	Olaf Möller	1,257	6.6	▲3.1	1,913	10.0	▲5.6
FDP	Gernot Poßögel	919	4.8	▲2.8	800	4.2	▲2.4
List-only parties					1,454	7.6	
Informal votes		992			802		
Total valid votes		18,976			19,166		
Turnout		19,968	56.9	▼2.3			
CDU hold	Majority	689	3.6	▼1.6			

=== 1999 election ===
State election (1999): Jena II
Notes:	Blue background denotes the winner of the electorate vote. Pink background denotes a candidate elected from their party list. Yellow background denotes an electorate win by a list member, or other incumbent. A ✓ or ✗ denotes status of any incumbent, win or lose respectively.						
Party	Candidate	Votes	%	±%	Party votes	%	±%
CDU	Andreas Trautvetter	7,294	36.2	▲7.6	8,109	40.2	▲11.2
SPD	✗ Gerd Schuchardt	6,243	31.0	▼9.1	4,605	22.8	▼11.0
PDS	Sabine Hoffmann	4,877	24.2	▲6.0	5,187	25.7	▲4.2
Greens	Olaf Möller	696	3.5	▼2.6	889	4.4	▼3.2
REP	Heinz-Joachim Herbert Schneider	481	2.4	▲0.8	203	1.0	▼0.5
FDP	Holger Glaeske	400	2.0	▼1.4	362	1.8	▼2.2
Independent	Irene Jüngling-Melnikow	176	0.9				
List-only parties					821	4.1	
Informal votes		201			192		
Total valid votes		20,167			20,176		
Turnout		20,368	59.2	▼17.2			
CDU gain from SPD	Majority	1,051	5.2				

=== 1994 election ===
State election (1994): Jena II
Notes:	Blue background denotes the winner of the electorate vote. Pink background denotes a candidate elected from their party list. Yellow background denotes an electorate win by a list member, or other incumbent. A ✓ or ✗ denotes status of any incumbent, win or lose respectively.						
Party	Candidate	Votes	%	±%	Party votes	%	±%
SPD	Gerd Schuchardt	11,032	40.1		9,279	33.8	
CDU		7,861	28.6		7,952	29.0	
PDS		5,008	18.2		5,915	21.5	
Greens		1,677	6.1		2,081	7.6	
FDP		934	3.4		1,108	4.0	
Independent		535	1.9				
REP		433	1.6		411	1.5	
List-only parties					713	2.6	
Informal votes		679			700		
Total valid votes		27,480			27,459		
Turnout		28,159	76.4				
SPD win new seat	Majority	3,171	11.5				
