= Jena I =

Electoral constituency in Thuringia, Germany

Jena I is an electoral constituency (German: Wahlkreis) represented in the Landtag of Thuringia. It elects one member via first-past-the-post voting. Under the current constituency numbering system, it is designated as constituency 37. It covers the western part of Jena.

Jena I was created for the 1994 state election. Since 2024, it has been represented by Jens Thomas of The Left.

== Geography ==
As of the 2019 state election, Jena I covers the western part of Jena, specifically the city districts (Ortsteile) of Ammerbach, Burgau, Closewitz, Cospeda, Göschwitz, Isserstedt, Jena-Nord, Jena-Süd, Jena-West, Jena-Zentrum, Krippendorf, Leutra, Lichtenhain, Lützeroda, Maua, Münchenroda/Remderoda, Vierzehnheiligen, and Winzerla.

== Members ==
The constituency was first won by the Social Democratic Party (SPD) in 1994, and represented by Christine Klaus. It was won by the Christian Democratic Union (CDU) and in 1999 and represented by Reyk Seela, who was re-elected in 2004. The SPD's candidate Christoph Matschie regained the constituency in 2009. In 2014, it was won by Torsten Wolf of The Left, and then by Jens Thomas in 2024.

Election	Member	Party	%
1994	Christine Klaus	SPD	34.2
1999	Reyk Seela	CDU	39.0
2004	Reyk Seela	CDU	30.0
2009	Christoph Matschie	SPD	26.9
2014	Torsten Wolf	LINKE	29.7
2019	Torsten Wolf	LINKE	31.5
2024	Jens Thomas	LINKE	33.5

== Election results ==
=== 2024 election ===
State election (2024): Jena I
Notes:	Blue background denotes the winner of the electorate vote. Pink background denotes a candidate elected from their party list. Yellow background denotes an electorate win by a list member, or other incumbent. A ✓ or ✗ denotes status of any incumbent, win or lose respectively.						
Party	Candidate	Votes	%	±%	Party votes	%	±%
Left	Jens Thomas	11,720	33.5	▲2.0	7,872	22.3	▼15.5
CDU	Ulrich Sigmar Schubert	8,229	23.5	▲8.1	6,658	18.9	▲5.9
AfD	Elisabeth Mengel-Stähle	5,752	16.4	▲4.4	5,040	14.3	▲3.1
Greens	Christina Prothmann	3,976	11.4	▼13.3	5,356	15.2	▼1.1
BSW					4,671	13.2	
SPD	Daniela Gruber	3,095	8.8	▼0.8	3,880	11.0	▲1.9
FW	Bertram Pelzer	1,349	3.9		341	1.0	
FDP	Perta Angelika Teufel	884	2.5	▼3.8	558	1.6	▼5.9
APT					265	0.8	▲0.3
Pirates					199	0.6	▲0.2
Values					139	0.4	
BD					108	0.3	
Familie					91	0.3	
ÖDP					59	0.2	▼0.3
MLPD					44	0.1	▼0.1
Informal votes		430			154		
Total valid votes		35,005			35,281		
Turnout		35,435	80.0	▲7.6			
Left hold	Majority	3,491	10.0	▲3.2			

=== 2019 election ===
State election (2019): Jena I
Notes:	Blue background denotes the winner of the electorate vote. Pink background denotes a candidate elected from their party list. Yellow background denotes an electorate win by a list member, or other incumbent. A ✓ or ✗ denotes status of any incumbent, win or lose respectively.						
Party	Candidate	Votes	%	±%	Party votes	%	±%
Left	✓ Torsten Wolf	10,253	31.5	▲1.8	12,336	37.8	▲8.5
Greens	Anja Siegesmund	8,028	24.7	▲8.8	5,319	16.3	▲1.0
CDU	Guntram Wothly	5,018	15.4	▼10.1	4,252	13.0	▼13.1
AfD	Denny Jankowski	3,921	12.0	▲4.7	3,672	11.2	▲4.0
SPD	Birgit Green	3,121	9.6	▼6.1	2,975	9.1	▼3.2
FDP	Philip Riegel	2,053	6.3	▲1.3	2,455	7.5	▲3.6
MLPD	Jonas Riese	147	0.5		75	0.2	
List-only parties					1,585	4.9	
Informal votes		295			167		
Total valid votes		32,541			32,669		
Turnout		32,836	72.4	▲15.1			
Left hold	Majority	2,225	6.8	▲2.6			

=== 2014 election ===
State election (2014): Jena I
Notes:	Blue background denotes the winner of the electorate vote. Pink background denotes a candidate elected from their party list. Yellow background denotes an electorate win by a list member, or other incumbent. A ✓ or ✗ denotes status of any incumbent, win or lose respectively.						
Party	Candidate	Votes	%	±%	Party votes	%	±%
Left	Torsten Wolf	8,330	29.7	▲5.7	8,252	29.3	▲4.4
CDU	Guntram Wothly	7,144	25.5	▲3.0	7,348	26.1	▲3.8
Greens	Anja Siegesmund	4,453	15.9	▲4.6	4,305	15.3	▼0.1
SPD	✗ Christoph Matschie	4,409	15.7	▼11.2	3,471	12.3	▼9.5
AfD	Wiebke Muhsal	2,047	7.3		2,025	7.2	
FDP	Uwe Barth	1,403	5.0	▼4.3	1,091	3.9	▼5.8
NPD	Frank Jahn	248	0.9	▼0.9	302	1.1	▼0.7
List-only parties					1,354	4.8	
Informal votes		345			231		
Total valid votes		28,034			28,148		
Turnout		28,379	57.3	▼2.6			
Left gain from SPD	Majority	1,186	4.2				

=== 2009 election ===
State election (2009): Jena I
Notes:	Blue background denotes the winner of the electorate vote. Pink background denotes a candidate elected from their party list. Yellow background denotes an electorate win by a list member, or other incumbent. A ✓ or ✗ denotes status of any incumbent, win or lose respectively.						
Party	Candidate	Votes	%	±%	Party votes	%	±%
SPD	Christoph Matschie	7,927	26.9	▲5.6	6,437	21.8	▲2.3
Left	Karin Kaschuba	7,076	24.0	▼2.9	7,343	24.9	▲0.4
CDU	✗ Reyk Seela	6,610	22.5	▼7.5	6,580	22.3	▼9.3
Greens	Anja Siegesmund	3,323	11.3	▼3.3	4,548	15.4	▲2.1
FDP	Uwe Barth	2,730	9.3	▲2.1	2,871	9.7	▲5.2
Free Voters	Jürgen Haschke	1,257	4.3		962	3.3	▲1.7
NPD	Christian Kaiser	517	1.8		517	1.8	▲0.6
List-only parties					202	0.7	
Informal votes		395			375		
Total valid votes		29,440			29,460		
Turnout		29,835	59.9	▲1.3			
SPD gain from CDU	Majority	851	2.9				

=== 2004 election ===
State election (2004): Jena I
Notes:	Blue background denotes the winner of the electorate vote. Pink background denotes a candidate elected from their party list. Yellow background denotes an electorate win by a list member, or other incumbent. A ✓ or ✗ denotes status of any incumbent, win or lose respectively.						
Party	Candidate	Votes	%	±%	Party votes	%	±%
CDU	✓ Reyk Seela	8,209	30.0	▼9.0	8,748	31.6	▼10.1
PDS	Karin Kaschuba	7,362	26.9	▲4.4	6,775	24.5	▲1.6
SPD	Christine Klaus	5,813	21.3	▼4.8	5,381	19.5	▼2.6
Greens	Matias Mieth	3,980	14.6	▲8.5	3,666	13.3	▲7.2
FDP	Uwe Barth	1,972	7.2	▲3.4	1,237	4.5	▲2.4
List-only parties					1,489	6.7	
Informal votes		1,096			776		
Total valid votes		27,336			27,656		
Turnout		28,432	58.6	▼1.9			
CDU hold	Majority	847	3.1	▼9.8			

=== 1999 election ===
State election (1999): Jena I
Notes:	Blue background denotes the winner of the electorate vote. Pink background denotes a candidate elected from their party list. Yellow background denotes an electorate win by a list member, or other incumbent. A ✓ or ✗ denotes status of any incumbent, win or lose respectively.						
Party	Candidate	Votes	%	±%	Party votes	%	±%
CDU	Reyk Seela	10,063	39.0	▲7.8	10,829	41.7	▲10.7
SPD	✗ Christine Klaus	6,737	26.1	▼8.1	5,727	22.1	▼11.4
PDS	Karin Kaschuba	5,820	22.5	▲5.0	5,944	22.9	▲3.8
Greens	Marco Schrul	1,568	6.1	▼5.4	1,593	6.1	▼2.4
FDP	Daniel Müller	983	3.8	▼0.4	555	2.1	▼1.9
REP	Wilhelm Tell	662	2.6	▲1.2	232	0.9	▼0.2
List-only parties					1,059	4.1	
Informal votes		312			206		
Total valid votes		25,833			25,939		
Turnout		26,145	60.5	▼14.9			
CDU gain from SPD	Majority	3,326	12.9				

=== 1994 election ===
State election (1994): Jena I
Notes:	Blue background denotes the winner of the electorate vote. Pink background denotes a candidate elected from their party list. Yellow background denotes an electorate win by a list member, or other incumbent. A ✓ or ✗ denotes status of any incumbent, win or lose respectively.						
Party	Candidate	Votes	%	±%	Party votes	%	±%
SPD	Christine Klaus	10,645	34.2		10,451	33.5	
CDU		9,712	31.2		9,685	31.0	
PDS		5,438	17.5		5,960	19.1	
Greens		3,562	11.4		2,644	8.5	
FDP		1,319	4.2		1,260	4.0	
REP		434	1.4		339	1.1	
List-only parties					868	2.8	
Informal votes		823			726		
Total valid votes		31,110			31,207		
Turnout		31,933	75.4				
SPD win new seat	Majority	933	3.0				
