= Saalfeld-Rudolstadt II =

Electoral constituency in Thuringia, Germany

Saalfeld-Rudolstadt II is an electoral constituency (German: Wahlkreis) represented in the Landtag of Thuringia. It elects one member via first-past-the-post voting. Under the current constituency numbering system, it is designated as constituency 29 and It covers the eastern part of Saalfeld-Rudolstadt.

Saalfeld-Rudolstadt II was created for the 1994 state election. Originally named Schwarzakreis II, it was renamed after the 1994 election. Since 2024, it has been represented by Denis Häußer of Alternative for Germany (AfD).

== Geography ==
As of the 2019 state election, Saalfeld-Rudolstadt II covers the eastern part of Saalfeld-Rudolstadt and a small part of Sonneberg district, specifically the municipalities of Altenbeuthen, Drognitz, Gräfenthal, Hohenwarte, Kaulsdorf, Lehesten, Leutenberg, Probstzella, Saalfeld/Saale (excluding Wittgendorf), and Unterwellenborn (from Saalfeld-Rudolstadt), and Neuhaus am Rennweg (only Lichte and Piesau) from Sonneberg.

== Members ==
The constituency was held by the Christian Democratic Union from its creation in 1994 until 2024. Its first representative was Harald Stauch, who served from 1994 to 2009, followed by Maik Kowalleck until 2024. Denis Häußer won the seat for the AfD in 2024.

Election	Member	Party	%
1994	Harald Stauch	CDU	39.0
1999	Harald Stauch	CDU	48.8
2004	Harald Stauch	CDU	41.8
2009	Maik Kowalleck	CDU	29.3
2014	Maik Kowalleck	CDU	41.3
2019	Maik Kowalleck	CDU	30.6
2024	Denis Häußer	AfD	38.6

== Election results ==
=== 2024 election ===
State election (2024): Saalfeld-Rudolstadt II
Notes:	Blue background denotes the winner of the electorate vote. Pink background denotes a candidate elected from their party list. Yellow background denotes an electorate win by a list member, or other incumbent. A ✓ or ✗ denotes status of any incumbent, win or lose respectively.						
Party	Candidate	Votes	%	±%	Party votes	%	±%
AfD	Denis Häußer	11,136	38.6	▲9.4	10,684	36.6	▲8.8
CDU	✗ Maik Kowalleck	10,398	36.1	▲5.5	6,246	21.4	▼0.4
BSW					5,143	17.6	
Left	Katharina König-Preuss	2,956	10.2	▼10.7	3,199	11.0	▼18.2
SPD	Steffen Lutz	2,007	7.0	▼2.6	1,447	5.0	▼2.3
Values	Steffen Teichmann	1,568	5.4		613	2.1	
FDP	André-René Kube	422	1.5	▼2.0	345	1.2	▼4.0
Greens	Frank Bock	355	1.2	▼2.5	494	1.7	▼1.5
APT					318	1.1	▼0.1
FW					219	0.8	
Familie					163	0.6	
BD					117	0.4	
Pirates					95	0.3	Steady
MLPD					40	0.1	▼0.3
ÖDP					40	0.1	▼0.3
Informal votes		586			274		
Total valid votes		28,842			29,154		
Turnout		29,428	73.7	▲8.9			
AfD gain from CDU	Majority	738	0.5				

=== 2019 election ===
State election (2019): Saalfeld-Rudolstadt II
Notes:	Blue background denotes the winner of the electorate vote. Pink background denotes a candidate elected from their party list. Yellow background denotes an electorate win by a list member, or other incumbent. A ✓ or ✗ denotes status of any incumbent, win or lose respectively.						
Party	Candidate	Votes	%	±%	Party votes	%	±%
CDU	✓ Maik Kowalleck	8,603	30.6	▼10.7	6,139	21.8	▼9.9
AfD	Michael Kaufmann	8,228	29.2		7,828	27.8	▲15.2
Left	Katharina König-Preuss	5,890	20.9	▼7.8	8,222	29.2	▲0.8
SPD	Robert Geheeb	2,697	9.6	▼4.0	2,052	7.3	▼5.6
Greens	Olaf Müller	1,037	3.7	▼2.9	902	3.2	▼1.2
FDP	Alexander Litvinenko	995	3.5	▼0.2	1,471	5.2	▲2.7
Free Voters	Roland Beyer	548	1.9				
MLPD	Gerhard Pfisterer	147	0.5		107	0.4	
List-only parties					1,484	5.3	
Informal votes		388			328		
Total valid votes		28,145			28,205		
Turnout		28,533	64.8	▲15.4			
CDU hold	Majority	375	1.4	▼11.2			

=== 2014 election ===
State election (2014): Saalfeld-Rudolstadt II
Notes:	Blue background denotes the winner of the electorate vote. Pink background denotes a candidate elected from their party list. Yellow background denotes an electorate win by a list member, or other incumbent. A ✓ or ✗ denotes status of any incumbent, win or lose respectively.						
Party	Candidate	Votes	%	±%	Party votes	%	±%
CDU	✓ Maik Kowalleck	9,149	41.3	▲12.0	7,149	31.7	▲2.6
Left	Katharina König	6,364	28.7	▲0.5	6,392	28.4	▼0.2
SPD	Julienne Trempert	3,022	13.6	▼8.1	2,907	12.9	▼6.8
AfD					2,829	12.6	
Greens	Sebastian Heuchel	1,464	6.6	▲1.0	988	4.4	▼0.4
NPD	Patrick Trautsch	1,333	6.0	▼0.6	1,042	4.6	▼1.6
FDP	Eckhard Linke	813	3.7	▼4.9	554	2.5	▼5.1
List-only parties					678	3.0	
Informal votes		883			489		
Total valid votes		22,145			22,539		
Turnout		23,028	49.4	▼4.3			
CDU hold	Majority	2,785	12.6	▲11.5			

=== 2009 election ===
State election (2009): Saalfeld-Rudolstadt II
Notes:	Blue background denotes the winner of the electorate vote. Pink background denotes a candidate elected from their party list. Yellow background denotes an electorate win by a list member, or other incumbent. A ✓ or ✗ denotes status of any incumbent, win or lose respectively.						
Party	Candidate	Votes	%	±%	Party votes	%	±%
CDU	Maik Kowalleck	7,721	29.3	▼12.5	7,692	29.1	▼13.6
Left	Roland Hahnemann	7,410	28.2	▼1.7	7,561	28.6	▲2.1
SPD	Christoph Majewski	5,718	21.7	▼0.4	5,194	19.7	▲3.5
FDP	Eckhard Linke	2,265	8.6	▲2.4	1,996	7.6	▲4.1
NPD	Patrick Trautsch	1,737	6.6		1,633	6.2	▲3.8
Greens	Sebastian Teuchel	1,472	5.6		1,275	4.8	▲1.5
List-only parties					1,067	4.0	
Informal votes		550			455		
Total valid votes		26,323			26,418		
Turnout		26,873	53.7	▲2.7			
CDU hold	Majority	311	1.1	▼10.8			

=== 2004 election ===
State election (2004): Saalfeld-Rudolstadt II
Notes:	Blue background denotes the winner of the electorate vote. Pink background denotes a candidate elected from their party list. Yellow background denotes an electorate win by a list member, or other incumbent. A ✓ or ✗ denotes status of any incumbent, win or lose respectively.						
Party	Candidate	Votes	%	±%	Party votes	%	±%
CDU	✓ Harald Stauch	10,483	41.8	▼7.0	10,799	42.7	▼7.8
PDS	Roland Hahnemann	7,499	29.9	▲7.7	6,705	26.5	▲5.1
SPD	Marko Wolfram	5,545	22.1	▼0.7	4,105	16.2	▼2.9
FDP	Eckhard Linke	1,567	6.2	▲4.7	889	3.5	▲2.5
List-only parties					2,814	11.1	
Informal votes		1,289			1,071		
Total valid votes		25,094			25,312		
Turnout		26,383	51.0	▼8.3			
CDU hold	Majority	2,984	11.9	▼14.1			

=== 1999 election ===
State election (1999): Saalfeld-Rudolstadt II
Notes:	Blue background denotes the winner of the electorate vote. Pink background denotes a candidate elected from their party list. Yellow background denotes an electorate win by a list member, or other incumbent. A ✓ or ✗ denotes status of any incumbent, win or lose respectively.						
Party	Candidate	Votes	%	±%	Party votes	%	±%
CDU	✓ Harald Stauch	15,005	48.8	▲9.8	15,607	50.5	▲9.8
SPD	Frieder Lippmann	6,999	22.8	▼10.9	5,914	19.1	▼12.0
PDS	Roland Hahnemann	6,823	22.2	▲6.5	6,601	21.4	▲4.8
REP	Roland Büschel	856	2.8	▲1.0	288	0.9	▼0.9
Greens	Jens Billig	621	2.0	▼3.7	452	1.5	▼3.1
FDP	Kay Rösler	448	1.5	▼2.5	308	1.0	▼2.4
List-only parties					1,723	5.6	
Informal votes		499			358		
Total valid votes		30,752			30,893		
Turnout		31,251	59.3	▼13.8			
CDU hold	Majority	8,006	26.0	▲20.7			

=== 1994 election ===
State election (1994): Schwarzakreis II
Notes:	Blue background denotes the winner of the electorate vote. Pink background denotes a candidate elected from their party list. Yellow background denotes an electorate win by a list member, or other incumbent. A ✓ or ✗ denotes status of any incumbent, win or lose respectively.						
Party	Candidate	Votes	%	±%	Party votes	%	±%
CDU	Harald Stauch	14,832	39.0		15,534	40.7	
SPD		12,800	33.7		11,869	31.1	
PDS		5,979	15.7		6,333	16.6	
Greens		2,164	5.7		1,747	4.6	
FDP		1,528	4.0		1,308	3.4	
REP		695	1.8		688	1.8	
List-only parties					725	1.9	
Informal votes		907			701		
Total valid votes		37,998			38,204		
Turnout		38,905	73.1				
CDU win new seat	Majority	2,032	5.3				
