= Torsten Wolf =

German politician

Member of the Landtag of Thuringia
- Incumbent
- Assumed office 14 September 2014
- Preceded by: Christoph Matschie
- Constituency: Jena I
- Majority: 10,253 (31.5%)

Chairman of the Education and Science Union Thuringia
- In office September 2010 – September 2014
- Preceded by: Jürgen Röhreich
- Succeeded by: Kathrin Vitzthum

Personal details
- Born: Torsten Wolf; 27 April 1968 (age 58) Wurzen, East Germany
- Party: The Left
- Education: University of Jena

Torsten Wolf (born 27 April 1968) is a German politician of The Left who has served as a member of the Landtag of Thuringia since 2014.

== Early life and education ==
Wolf grew up in Ilmenau, then in East Germany, in 1968. He was involved in the opposition environmental movement with the Protestant Church since he was a schoolboy, for which he was targeted by the local government and Stasi. He completed an apprenticeship as a maintenance mechanic and worked for the water management authority. After applying for an exit visa in November 1987 at the age of 19, Wolf fled to West Germany on 18 May 1988, where he worked in factories in Schwäbisch Gmünd and Kassel. After German reunification, he returned to Ilmenau in 1992 and resumed his studies. He attended the Ilmenau College and acquired his Abitur in 1995, and completed a degree in political science, economics and modern history at the University of Jena in 2000.

== Trade union and political career ==
In 2001, Wolf joined the German Trade Union Confederation initially working as a qualification coordinator, then as secretary of the East Thuringia region from 2003. He was state chairman of the Education and Science Union (GEW) from 2010 to 2014.

Wolf was initially a member of the Social Democratic Party, but later switched to The Left. He ran for the Left in the constituency of Jena I in the 2014 Thuringian state election against SPD incumbent Christoph Matschie, and won with 29.7% of votes. He was re-elected in 2019.
