= Saalfeld-Rudolstadt I =

Electoral constituency in Thuringia, Germany

Saalfeld-Rudolstadt I is an electoral constituency (German: Wahlkreis) represented in the Landtag of Thuringia. It elects one member via first-past-the-post voting. Under the current constituency numbering system, it is designated as constituency 28. It covers the western part of Saalfeld-Rudolstadt.

Saalfeld-Rudolstadt I was created for the 1994 state election. Originally named Schwarzakreis I, it was renamed after the 1994 election. Since 2024, it has been represented by Thomas Benninghaus of Alternative for Germany (AfD).

== Geography ==
As of the 2019 state election, Saalfeld-Rudolstadt I covers the western part of Saalfeld-Rudolstadt, specifically the municipalities of Allendorf, Bad Blankenburg, Bechstedt, Cursdorf, Deesbach, Döschnitz, Katzhütte, Königsee, Meura, Rohrbach, Rudolstadt (excluding Ammelstädt, Breitenherda, Eschdorf, Geitersdorf, Haufeld, Heilsberg, Milbitz, Remda, Sundremda, Teichel, Teichröda, and Treppendorf), Saalfeld/Saale (only Wittgendorf), Schwarzatal, Schwarzburg, Sitzendorf, and Unterweißbach.

== Members ==
The constituency was held by the Christian Democratic Union (CDU) from its creation in 1994 until 2014, during which time it was represented by Gert Wunderlich (1994–2004), Gerhard Günther (2004–2014), and Herbert Wirkner (2014–2019).

Since 2019, it is held by Alternative for Germany, initially represented by Karlheinz Frosch, and following the 2024 election by Thomas Benninghaus.

Election	Member	Party	%
1994	Gert Wunderlich	CDU	42.0
1999	Gert Wunderlich	CDU	49.3
2004	Gerhard Günther	CDU	44.0
2009	Gerhard Günther	CDU	36.4
2014	Herbert Wirkner	CDU	38.8
2019	Karlheinz Frosch	AfD	29.1
2024	Thomas Benninghaus	AfD	37.5

== Election results ==
=== 2024 election ===
State election (2024): Saalfeld-Rudolstadt I
Notes:	Blue background denotes the winner of the electorate vote. Pink background denotes a candidate elected from their party list. Yellow background denotes an electorate win by a list member, or other incumbent. A ✓ or ✗ denotes status of any incumbent, win or lose respectively.						
Party	Candidate	Votes	%	±%	Party votes	%	±%
AfD	Thomas Benninghaus	10,304	37.5	▲8.4	10,242	37.0	▲8.5
CDU	Martin Friedrich	8,469	30.9	▲8.3	5,722	20.7	▲0.8
BSW	Rainer Kräuter	5,056	18.4		5,173	18.7	
Left	Daniel Starost	2,771	10.1	▼12.5	3,209	11.6	▼8.3
SPD					1,309	4.7	▼2.5
Greens					455	1.6	▼1.5
FDP	Henry Götze	508	1.9	▼3.8	301	1.1	▼3.9
Independent	Harald Karlheinz Frosch	335	1.2				
Values					346	1.2	
APT					296	1.1	▲0.1
FW					252	0.9	
Familie					128	0.5	
BD					118	0.4	
Pirates					80	0.3	Steady
ÖDP					39	0.1	▼0.3
MLPD					30	0.1	▼0.3
Informal votes		538			281		
Total valid votes		27,443			27,700		
Turnout		27,981	72.9	▲7.8			
AfD hold	Majority	1,835	6.6	▲0.4			

=== 2019 election ===
State election (2019): Saalfeld-Rudolstadt I
Notes:	Blue background denotes the winner of the electorate vote. Pink background denotes a candidate elected from their party list. Yellow background denotes an electorate win by a list member, or other incumbent. A ✓ or ✗ denotes status of any incumbent, win or lose respectively.						
Party	Candidate	Votes	%	±%	Party votes	%	±%
AfD	Karlheinz Frosch	7,183	29.1		7,041	28.5	▲16.2
Left	Rainer Kräuter	5,654	22.9	▼8.3	7,628	30.8	▲0.7
CDU	✗ Herbert Wirkner	5,572	22.6	▼16.2	4,934	19.9	▼11.4
SPD	Oliver Weder	3,121	12.6	▼1.3	1,771	7.2	▼4.4
FDP	Henry Götze	1,412	5.7	▲0.8	1,229	5.0	▲2.3
Greens	Frank Andreas Bock	868	3.5	▼2.1	767	3.1	▼1.0
Free Voters	Ralf Thun	760	3.1				
MLPD	Reiner Dworschak	116	0.5		87	0.4	
List-only parties					1,375	5.6	
Informal votes		361			302		
Total valid votes		24,686			24,745		
Turnout		25,047	65.1	▲13.9			
AfD gain from CDU	Majority	1,529	6.2				

=== 2014 election ===
State election (2014): Saalfeld-Rudolstadt I
Notes:	Blue background denotes the winner of the electorate vote. Pink background denotes a candidate elected from their party list. Yellow background denotes an electorate win by a list member, or other incumbent. A ✓ or ✗ denotes status of any incumbent, win or lose respectively.						
Party	Candidate	Votes	%	±%	Party votes	%	±%
CDU	Herbert Wirkner	7,829	38.8	▲2.4	6,452	31.3	▼0.4
Left	Rainer Kräuter	6,288	31.2	▲0.8	6,187	30.1	▲0.1
AfD					2,534	12.3	
SPD	Marion Rosin	2,800	13.9	▲0.6	2,394	11.6	▼5.2
NPD	Mandy Meinhardt	1,145	5.7	▼0.7	928	4.5	▼1.4
Greens	Rainer Wernicke	1,124	5.6	▼0.3	851	4.1	▼0.4
FDP	Marian Koppe	996	4.9	▼2.7	557	2.7	▼4.3
List-only parties					679	3.3	
Informal votes		859			459		
Total valid votes		20,182			20,582		
Turnout		21,041	51.2	▼5.0			
CDU hold	Majority	1,541	7.6	▲1.6			

=== 2009 election ===
State election (2009): Saalfeld-Rudolstadt I
Notes:	Blue background denotes the winner of the electorate vote. Pink background denotes a candidate elected from their party list. Yellow background denotes an electorate win by a list member, or other incumbent. A ✓ or ✗ denotes status of any incumbent, win or lose respectively.						
Party	Candidate	Votes	%	±%	Party votes	%	±%
CDU	✓ Gerhard Günther	8,871	36.4	▼7.6	7,743	31.7	▼11.3
Left	Andreas Grünschneder	7,401	30.4	▼2.0	7,318	30.0	▲3.3
SPD	Daniel Karakaschew	3,230	13.3	▼3.8	4,107	16.8	▲2.6
FDP	Marian Koppe	1,847	7.6	▲1.1	1,707	7.0	▲3.5
NPD	Steffen Richter	1,549	6.4		1,433	5.9	▲3.1
Greens	Michael Bergmann	1,445	5.9		1,091	4.5	▲1.3
List-only parties					1,018	4.2	
Informal votes		481			407		
Total valid votes		24,343			24,417		
Turnout		24,824	56.2	▲0.5			
CDU hold	Majority	1,470	6.0	▼5.6			

=== 2004 election ===
State election (2004): Saalfeld-Rudolstadt I
Notes:	Blue background denotes the winner of the electorate vote. Pink background denotes a candidate elected from their party list. Yellow background denotes an electorate win by a list member, or other incumbent. A ✓ or ✗ denotes status of any incumbent, win or lose respectively.						
Party	Candidate	Votes	%	±%	Party votes	%	±%
CDU	Gerhard Günther	10,657	44.0	▼5.0	10,566	43.0	▼7.5
PDS	Hubert Krawczyk	7,860	32.4	▲10.8	6,564	26.7	▲6.5
SPD	Hans-Heinrich Tschoepke	4,154	17.1	▼6.9	3,486	14.2	▼4.7
FDP	Volker Weber	1,577	6.5	▲4.1	856	3.5	▲2.3
List-only parties					3,088	12.6	
Informal votes		1,547			1,235		
Total valid votes		24,248			24,560		
Turnout		25,795	55.7	▼6.3			
CDU hold	Majority	2,797	11.6	▼13.4			

=== 1999 election ===
State election (1999): Saalfeld-Rudolstadt I
Notes:	Blue background denotes the winner of the electorate vote. Pink background denotes a candidate elected from their party list. Yellow background denotes an electorate win by a list member, or other incumbent. A ✓ or ✗ denotes status of any incumbent, win or lose respectively.						
Party	Candidate	Votes	%	±%	Party votes	%	±%
CDU	✓ Gert Wunderlich	14,856	49.3	▲7.2	15,356	50.7	▲7.9
SPD	Gerhard Botz	7,193	23.8	▼8.5	5,710	18.8	▼10.9
PDS	Hubert Krawczyk	6,487	21.5	▲5.3	6,093	20.1	▲3.7
REP	Friedhard Beck	920	3.1	▲1.2	252	0.8	▼1.1
FDP	Hans-Helmut Lawatsch	704	2.3	▼0.6	354	1.2	▼2.0
List-only parties					2,543	8.4	
Informal votes		609			461		
Total valid votes		30,160			30,308		
Turnout		30,769	61.8	▼12.9			
CDU hold	Majority	7,663	25.5	▲15.7			

=== 1994 election ===
State election (1994): Schwarzakreis I
Notes:	Blue background denotes the winner of the electorate vote. Pink background denotes a candidate elected from their party list. Yellow background denotes an electorate win by a list member, or other incumbent. A ✓ or ✗ denotes status of any incumbent, win or lose respectively.						
Party	Candidate	Votes	%	±%	Party votes	%	±%
CDU	Gert Wunderlich	15,265	42.0		15,631	42.8	
SPD		11,744	32.3		10,875	29.8	
PDS		5,893	16.2		6,006	16.4	
Greens		1,664	4.6		1,439	3.9	
FDP		1,050	2.9		1,185	3.2	
REP		705	1.9		690	1.9	
List-only parties					727	2.0	
Informal votes		1,093			861		
Total valid votes		36,321			36,553		
Turnout		37,414	74.6				
CDU win new seat	Majority	3,521	9.7				
