= Altenburger Land I =

Electoral constituency in Thuringia, Germany

Altenburger Land I is an electoral constituency (German: Wahlkreis) represented in the Landtag of Thuringia. It elects one member via first-past-the-post voting. Under the current constituency numbering system, it is designated as constituency 43. It covers the western part of Altenburger Land.

Altenburger Land I was created for the 1994 state election. Originally named Altenburg I, it was renamed after the 1994 election. Since 2024, it has been represented by Thomas Hoffmann of Alternative for Germany (AfD).

== Geography ==
As of the 2019 state election, Altenburger Land I covers the western part of Altenburger Land, specifically the municipalities of Dobitschen, Göhren, Göllnitz, Gößnitz, Heukewalde, Heyersdorf, Jonaswalde, Kriebitzsch, Löbichau, Lödla, Lucka, Mehna, Meuselwitz, Monstab, Ponitz, Posterstein, Rositz, Schmölln, Starkenberg, Thonhausen, and Vollmershain.

== Members ==
The constituency was held by the Christian Democratic Union (CDU) from its creation in 1994 until 2019, and was represented by Fritz Schröter (1994–2014) and Simone Schulze (2014–2019). It was won by Alternative for Germany in 2019 and represented by Thomas-Otto Rudy. In 2024, Thomas Hoffmann held the seat for the AfD.

Election	Member	Party	%
1994	Fritz Schröter	CDU	46.9
1999	Fritz Schröter	CDU	48.4
2004	Fritz Schröter	CDU	40.1
2009	Fritz Schröter	CDU	34.0
2014	Simone Schulze	CDU	34.5
2019	Thomas-Otto Rudy	AfD	29.5
2024	Thomas Hoffmann	AfD	42.4

== Election results ==
=== 1994 election ===
State election (1994): Altenburg I
Notes:	Blue background denotes the winner of the electorate vote. Pink background denotes a candidate elected from their party list. Yellow background denotes an electorate win by a list member, or other incumbent. A ✓ or ✗ denotes status of any incumbent, win or lose respectively.						
Party	Candidate	Votes	%	±%	Party votes	%	±%
CDU	Fritz Schröter	15,950	46.9		15,664	46.0	
SPD		11,468	33.7		10,535	30.9	
PDS		4,955	14.6		4,693	13.8	
FDP		1,638	4.8		946	2.8	
List-only parties					2,233	6.6	
Informal votes		1,526			1,466		
Total valid votes		34,011			34,071		
Turnout		35,537	73.1				
CDU win new seat	Majority	3,482	13.2				

=== 1999 election ===
State election (1999): Altenburger Land I
Notes:	Blue background denotes the winner of the electorate vote. Pink background denotes a candidate elected from their party list. Yellow background denotes an electorate win by a list member, or other incumbent. A ✓ or ✗ denotes status of any incumbent, win or lose respectively.						
Party	Candidate	Votes	%	±%	Party votes	%	±%
CDU	✓ Fritz Schröter	12,667	48.4	▲1.5	13,289	50.2	▲4.2
PDS	Michaele Sojka	6,667	25.5	▲11.0	6,009	22.7	▲8.9
SPD	Sieghardt Rydzewski	5,046	19.3	▼14.4	4,646	17.6	▼13.3
FDP	Rolf Hermann	1,780	6.8	▲2.0	403	1.5	▼1.3
List-only parties					2,101	7.9	
Informal votes		775			487		
Total valid votes		26,160			26,448		
Turnout		26,935	55.2	▼18.0			
CDU hold	Majority	6,000	22.9	▲9.7			

=== 2004 election ===
State election (2004): Altenburger Land I
Notes:	Blue background denotes the winner of the electorate vote. Pink background denotes a candidate elected from their party list. Yellow background denotes an electorate win by a list member, or other incumbent. A ✓ or ✗ denotes status of any incumbent, win or lose respectively.						
Party	Candidate	Votes	%	±%	Party votes	%	±%
CDU	✓ Fritz Schröter	9,096	40.1	▼8.3	10,125	44.6	▼5.6
PDS	Michaele Sojka	6,731	29.7	▲4.2	5,848	25.8	▲3.1
SPD	Hartmut Schubert	5,156	22.7	▲3.4	3,450	15.2	▼2.4
FDP	Karsten Schalla	1,718	7.6	▲0.8	964	4.2	▲2.7
List-only parties					2,320	10.2	
Informal votes		1,255			1,249		
Total valid votes		22,701			22,707		
Turnout		23,956	50.6	▼4.6			
CDU hold	Majority	2,365	10.4	▼12.5			

=== 2009 election ===
State election (2009): Altenburger Land I
Notes:	Blue background denotes the winner of the electorate vote. Pink background denotes a candidate elected from their party list. Yellow background denotes an electorate win by a list member, or other incumbent. A ✓ or ✗ denotes status of any incumbent, win or lose respectively.						
Party	Candidate	Votes	%	±%	Party votes	%	±%
CDU	✓ Fritz Schröter	7,942	34.0	▼6.1	8,214	34.9	▼9.7
Left	Michaele Sojka	7,394	31.7	▲2.0	6,460	27.4	▲1.6
SPD	Brita Große	4,299	18.4	▼4.3	4,225	18.0	▲2.8
FDP	Steffen Plaul	2,340	10.0	▲2.4	1,834	7.8	▲3.6
NPD	Jenny Claas	1,373	5.9		1,259	5.3	▲3.6
Greens					786	3.3	▲1.1
List-only parties					759	3.2	
Informal votes		781			592		
Total valid votes		23,348			23,537		
Turnout		24,129	53.3	▲2.7			
CDU hold	Majority	548	2.3	▼8.1			

=== 2014 election ===
State election (2014): Altenburger Land I
Notes:	Blue background denotes the winner of the electorate vote. Pink background denotes a candidate elected from their party list. Yellow background denotes an electorate win by a list member, or other incumbent. A ✓ or ✗ denotes status of any incumbent, win or lose respectively.						
Party	Candidate	Votes	%	±%	Party votes	%	±%
CDU	Simone Schulze	6,823	34.5	▲0.5	6,913	34.7	▼0.2
Left	Ute Lukasch	5,519	27.9	▼3.8	5,533	27.8	▲0.4
SPD	Hartmut Schubert	4,076	20.6	▲2.2	2,486	12.5	▼5.5
AfD					2,395	12.0	
Free Voters	Steffen Kühn	1,397	7.1		453	2.3	0.0
NPD	Anja Neubauer	1,247	6.3	▲0.4	829	4.2	▼1.1
Greens	Paula Piechotta	706	3.6		640	3.2	▼0.1
List-only parties					662	3.3	
Informal votes		477			334		
Total valid votes		19,768			19,911		
Turnout		20,245	49.1	▼4.2			
CDU hold	Majority	1,304	6.6	▲4.3			

=== 2019 election ===
State election (2019): Altenburger Land I
Notes:	Blue background denotes the winner of the electorate vote. Pink background denotes a candidate elected from their party list. Yellow background denotes an electorate win by a list member, or other incumbent. A ✓ or ✗ denotes status of any incumbent, win or lose respectively.						
Party	Candidate	Votes	%	±%	Party votes	%	±%
AfD	Thomas-Otto Rudy	6,547	29.5		6,601	29.6	▲17.6
Left	Ute Lukasch	5,380	24.3	▼3.6	6,381	28.6	▲0.8
CDU	✗ Simone Schulze	5,251	23.7	▼10.8	4,715	21.2	▼13.5
SPD	Hartmut Schubert	2,505	11.3	▼9.3	1,662	7.5	▼5.0
FDP	Udo Pick	1,551	7.0		1,085	4.9	▲2.8
Greens	Nick Purand	779	3.5	▼0.1	652	2.9	▼0.3
MLPD	Steffen Heinke	149	0.7		53	0.2	
List-only parties					1,128	5.1	
Informal votes		436			321		
Total valid votes		22,162			22,277		
Turnout		22,598	61.4	▲12.3			
AfD gain from CDU	Majority	1,167	5.2				

=== 2024 election ===
State election (2024): Altenburger Land I
Notes:	Blue background denotes the winner of the electorate vote. Pink background denotes a candidate elected from their party list. Yellow background denotes an electorate win by a list member, or other incumbent. A ✓ or ✗ denotes status of any incumbent, win or lose respectively.						
Party	Candidate	Votes	%	±%	Party votes	%	±%
AfD	Thomas Hoffmann	10,519	42.4	▲12.9	10,293	41.3	▲11.7
CDU	Julian Degner	6,340	25.5	▲1.8	5,465	21.9	▲0.7
BSW	Tine Rolle	3,871	15.6		4,098	16.5	
Left	Mandy Eißing	1,978	8.0	▼16.3	2,294	9.2	▼19.4
SPD	Frank Rauschenbach	1,256	5.1	▼6.2	1,128	4.5	▼3.0
FW	Frank Hauffe	562	2.3		251	1.0	
Greens					318	1.3	▼1.6
FDP	Jörg Wachter	295	1.2	▼5.8	237	1.0	▼3.9
APT					258	1.0	▼0.3
BD					230	0.9	
Familie					137	0.6	
Values					83	0.3	
Pirates					58	0.2	▼0.1
ÖDP					31	0.1	▼0.3
MLPD					22	0.1	▼0.1
Informal votes		299			217		
Total valid votes		24,821			24,903		
Turnout		25,120	71.8	▲10.4			
AfD hold	Majority	4,179	16.9	▲11.7			
