= Erfurt II =

Electoral constituency in Thuringia, Germany

Erfurt II is an electoral constituency (German: Wahlkreis) represented in the Landtag of Thuringia. It elects one member via first-past-the-post voting. Under the current constituency numbering system, it is designated as constituency 25. It contains central and western parts of Erfurt, the capital and largest city of Thuringia.

Erfurt II was created in 1990 for the first state election. Since 2024, it has been represented by Niklas Waßmann of the CDU.

== Geography ==
As of the 2019 state election, Erfurt II is located entirely within the urban district of Erfurt. It covers the central and western part of the city, specifically the city districts (Stadtteile) of Andreasvorstadt, Berliner Platz, Bindersleben, Brühlervorstadt, Ermstedt, Gottstedt, Ilversgehofen, Johannesplatz, Marbach, and Salomonsborn.

== Members ==
The constituency was held by the Christian Democratic Union (CDU) from its creation in 1990 until 2009, during which time it was represented by Norbert Otto (1990–1994), Bernhard Vogel (1994–2004), and Michael Panse (2004–2009). It was then held by The Left from 2009 tot 2024, represented by Susanne Hennig-Wellsow. The seat was won back for the CDU by Niklas Waßmann in 2024.

Election	Member	Party	%
1990	Norbert Otto	CDU	37.4
1994	Bernhard Vogel	CDU	40.5
1999	Bernhard Vogel	CDU	52.1
2004	Michael Panse	CDU	34.2
2009	Susanne Hennig-Wellsow	LINKE	28.8
2014	Susanne Hennig-Wellsow	LINKE	31.0
2019	Susanne Hennig-Wellsow	LINKE	32.7
2024	Niklas Waßmann	CDU	33.7

== Election results ==
=== 2024 election ===
State election (2024): Erfurt II
Notes:	Blue background denotes the winner of the electorate vote. Pink background denotes a candidate elected from their party list. Yellow background denotes an electorate win by a list member, or other incumbent. A ✓ or ✗ denotes status of any incumbent, win or lose respectively.						
Party	Candidate	Votes	%	±%	Party votes	%	±%
CDU	Niklas Waßmann	11,478	33.7	▲9.0	7,576	22.0	▲6.2
AfD	Corinna Herold	8,064	23.7		7,120	20.7	▲4.3
Left	Katja Maurer	7,917	23.3	▼9.4	6,852	19.9	▼16.4
BSW					4,665	13.6	
SPD	Frank Warnecke	3,545	10.4	▼2.3	3,469	10.1	▲1.0
Greens	David Maicher	1,604	4.7	▼8.8	2,930	8.5	▼2.0
FDP	Thomas Karl Leonard Kemmerich	1,066	3.1	▼5.2	448	1.3	▼4.6
APT					414	1.2	▲0.2
MLPD	Tassilo Timm	358	1.1	▼0.4	76	0.2	▼0.1
FW					205	0.5	
Pirates					185	0.5	Steady
BD					144	0.4	
Values					127	0.4	
Familie					121	0.4	
ÖDP					88	0.3	▼0.3
Informal votes		638			250		
Total valid votes		34,032			34,420		
Turnout		34,670	75.6	▲7.0			
CDU gain from Left	Majority	3,414	10.0				

=== 2019 election ===
State election (2019): Erfurt II
Notes:	Blue background denotes the winner of the electorate vote. Pink background denotes a candidate elected from their party list. Yellow background denotes an electorate win by a list member, or other incumbent. A ✓ or ✗ denotes status of any incumbent, win or lose respectively.						
Party	Candidate	Votes	%	±%	Party votes	%	±%
Left	✓ Susanne Hennig-Wellsow	10,014	32.7	▲1.7	11,584	36.3	▲5.9
CDU	Niklas Waßmann	7,574	24.7	▼5.4	5,038	15.8	▼10.4
AfD					5,246	16.4	▲7.2
Greens	Astrid Rothe-Beinlich	4,137	13.5	▲1.7	3,365	10.5	▼0.7
SPD	Frank Warnecke	3,890	12.7	▼5.2	2,896	9.1	▼5.0
FDP	Jan Siegemund	2,533	8.3	▲5.0	1,876	5.9	▲3.1
Free Voters	Lisa Maria Schmidt	2,006	6.6				
MLPD	Tassilo Timm	451	1.5		94	0.3	
List-only parties					1,843	5.8	
Informal votes		1,728			391		
Total valid votes		30,605			31,942		
Turnout		32,333	68.6	▲13.8			
Left hold	Majority	2,440	8.0	▲7.1			

=== 2014 election ===
State election (2014): Erfurt II
Notes:	Blue background denotes the winner of the electorate vote. Pink background denotes a candidate elected from their party list. Yellow background denotes an electorate win by a list member, or other incumbent. A ✓ or ✗ denotes status of any incumbent, win or lose respectively.						
Party	Candidate	Votes	%	±%	Party votes	%	±%
Left	✓ Susanne Hennig-Wellsow	8,204	31.0	▲2.2	8,139	30.4	▲2.4
CDU	Michael Panse	7,978	30.1	▲4.7	6,998	24.6	▲1.5
SPD	Frank Warnecke	4,742	17.9	▼3.5	3,776	14.1	▼6.0
Greens	Astrid Rothe-Beinlich	3,136	11.8	▼1.0	2,973	11.1	▼0.4
AfD					2,484	9.3	
FDP	Iris Thorwirth	862	3.3	▼5.0	761	2.8	▼5.1
NPD	Frank Schwerdt	812	3.1	▼0.2	525	2.0	▼1.0
Pirates	Alexandra Bernhardt	748	2.8		432	1.6	
List-only parties					677	2.5	
Informal votes		589			306		
Total valid votes		26,482			26,765		
Turnout		27,071	54.8	▼3.0			
Left hold	Majority	226	0.9	▼2.5			

=== 2009 election ===
State election (2009): Erfurt II
Notes:	Blue background denotes the winner of the electorate vote. Pink background denotes a candidate elected from their party list. Yellow background denotes an electorate win by a list member, or other incumbent. A ✓ or ✗ denotes status of any incumbent, win or lose respectively.						
Party	Candidate	Votes	%	±%	Party votes	%	±%
Left	Susanne Hennig	7,936	28.8	▼5.1	7,742	28.0	▼2.9
CDU	✗ Michael Panse	6,986	25.4	▼8.8	6,794	24.6	▼11.1
SPD	Frank Warnecke	5,878	21.4	▲5.0	5,562	20.1	▲5.3
Greens	Astrid Rothe-Beinlich	3,523	12.8	▲1.9	3,179	11.5	▲2.2
FDP	Matthias Fertig	2,276	8.3	▲3.6	2,175	7.9	▲4.3
NPD	Jens Zschirpe	912	3.3		819	3.0	▲2.1
List-only parties					1,372	5.0	
Informal votes		580			448		
Total valid votes		27,511			27,643		
Turnout		28,091	57.8	▲6.0			
Left gain from CDU	Majority	950	3.4				

=== 2004 election ===
State election (2004): Erfurt II
Notes:	Blue background denotes the winner of the electorate vote. Pink background denotes a candidate elected from their party list. Yellow background denotes an electorate win by a list member, or other incumbent. A ✓ or ✗ denotes status of any incumbent, win or lose respectively.						
Party	Candidate	Votes	%	±%	Party votes	%	±%
CDU	Michael Panse	7,803	34.2	▼17.9	8,225	35.7	▼12.4
PDS	André Blechschmidt	7,721	33.9	▲10.9	7,125	30.9	▲6.6
SPD	Andreas Bausewein	3,730	16.4	▼2.4	3,407	14.8	▼3.3
Greens	Astrid Rothe	2,474	10.9	▲7.1	2,150	9.3	▲5.6
FDP	Andreas Möller	1,068	4.7	▲3.8	829	3.6	▲2.7
List-only parties					1,286	5.6	
Informal votes		1,073			847		
Total valid votes		22,796			23,022		
Turnout		23,869	51.8	▼10.6			
CDU hold	Majority	82	0.3	▼28.8			

=== 1999 election ===
State election (1999): Erfurt II
Notes:	Blue background denotes the winner of the electorate vote. Pink background denotes a candidate elected from their party list. Yellow background denotes an electorate win by a list member, or other incumbent. A ✓ or ✗ denotes status of any incumbent, win or lose respectively.						
Party	Candidate	Votes	%	±%	Party votes	%	±%
CDU	✓ Bernhard Vogel	13,782	52.1	▲11.6	12,783	48.1	▲13.2
PDS	Cornelia Nitzpon	6,082	23.0	▲2.6	6,447	24.3	▲2.8
SPD	Rosemarie Bechthum	4,984	18.8	▼10.8	4,799	18.1	▼11.3
Greens	Annemarie Voss	996	3.8	▼5.7	985	3.7	▼2.8
REP	Torsten Krummrich	387	1.5		168	0.6	▼0.4
FDP	Andreas Möller	240	0.9		249	0.9	▼1.8
List-only parties					1,141	4.3	
Informal votes		402			301		
Total valid votes		26,471			26,572		
Turnout		26,873	62.4	▼9.7			
CDU hold	Majority	7,700	29.1	▲18.2			

=== 1994 election ===
State election (1994): Erfurt II
Notes:	Blue background denotes the winner of the electorate vote. Pink background denotes a candidate elected from their party list. Yellow background denotes an electorate win by a list member, or other incumbent. A ✓ or ✗ denotes status of any incumbent, win or lose respectively.						
Party	Candidate	Votes	%	±%	Party votes	%	±%
CDU	Bernhard Vogel	12,430	40.5	▲3.1	10,738	34.9	▼3.2
SPD		9,066	29.6	▲7.9	9,029	29.4	▲5.9
PDS		6,244	20.4	▲6.0	6,592	21.5	▲7.1
Greens		2,918	9.5	▼5.3	2,009	6.5	▼4.0
List-only parties					2,362	7.7	
Informal votes		785			713		
Total valid votes		30,658			30,730		
Turnout		31,443	72.1	▲6.8			
CDU hold	Majority	3,364	10.9	▼5.2			

=== 1990 election ===
State election (1990): Erfurt II
Notes:	Blue background denotes the winner of the electorate vote. Pink background denotes a candidate elected from their party list. Yellow background denotes an electorate win by a list member, or other incumbent. A ✓ or ✗ denotes status of any incumbent, win or lose respectively.						
Party	Candidate	Votes	%	±%	Party votes	%	±%
CDU	Norbert Otto	9,653	37.4		9,940	38.1	
SPD		5,603	21.7		6,136	23.5	
Greens		3,821	14.8		2,747	10.5	
PDS		3,725	14.4		3,766	14.4	
FDP		1,933	7.5		2,405	9.2	
DSU		810	3.1		544	2.1	
UFV		273	1.1		180	0.7	
List-only parties					400	1.5	
Informal votes		905			605		
Total valid votes		25,818			26,118		
Turnout		26,723	65.3				
CDU win new seat	Majority	4,050	15.7				
