= Susanne Hennig-Wellsow =

German politician (born 1977)

Susanne Hennig-Wellsow MdB
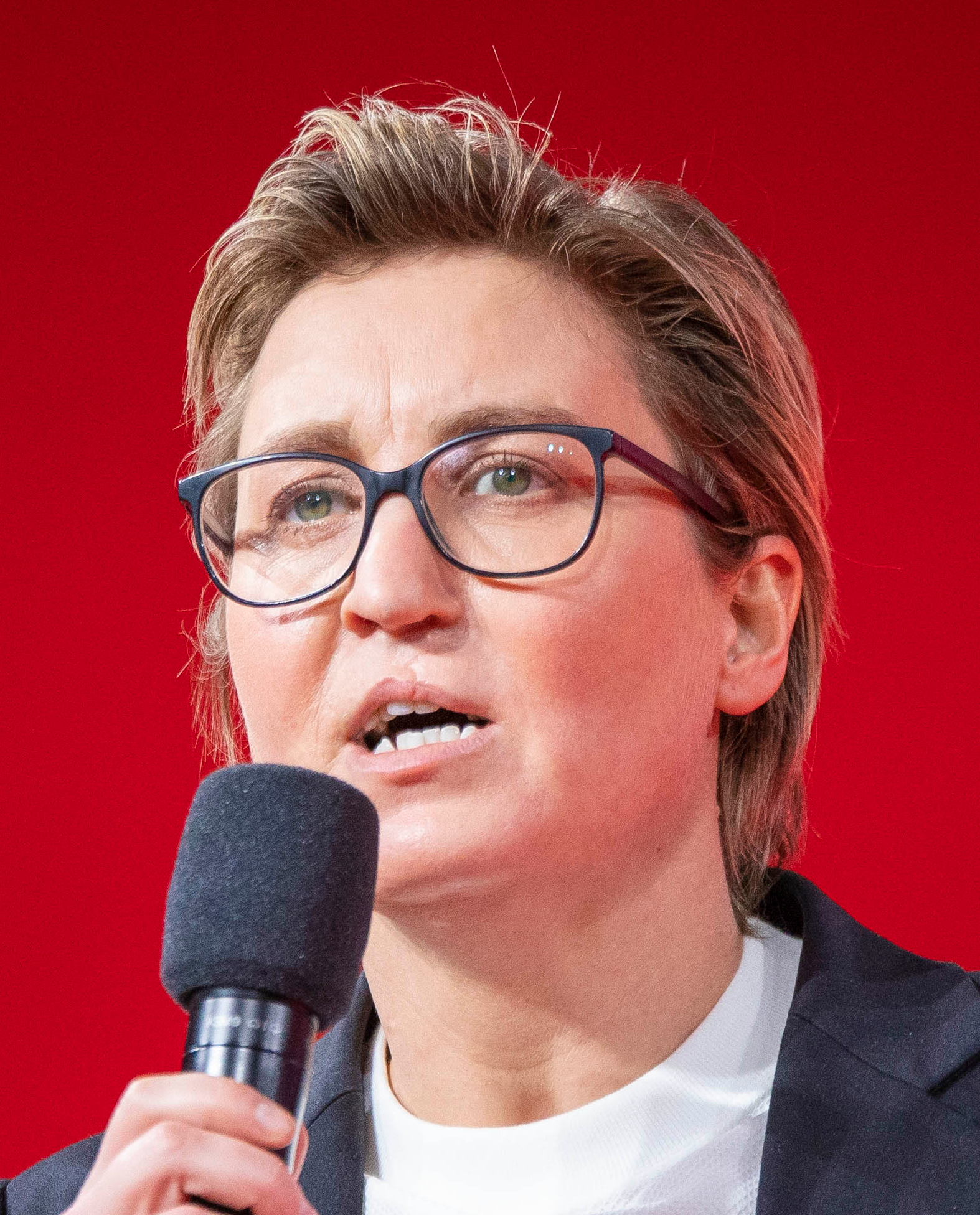
- Hennig-Wellsow in 2021

Leader of The Left
- In office 27 February 2021 – 20 April 2022 Serving with Janine Wissler
- Deputy: Ali Al-Dailami; Ates Gürpinar; Tobias Pflüger; Martina Renner; Katina Schubert; Jana Seppelt
- Preceded by: Bernd Riexinger
- Succeeded by: Martin Schirdewan

Leader of The Left in Thuringia
- In office 17 November 2013 – 1 March 2021
- Deputy: Steffen Dittes; Heike Werner
- Preceded by: Knut Korschewsky
- Succeeded by: Ulrike Grosse-Röthig; Christian Schaft

Leader of The Left in the Landtag of Thuringia
- In office 10 December 2014 – 3 March 2021
- Deputy: Ronald Hande; Katja Mitteldorf
- Preceded by: Bodo Ramelow
- Succeeded by: Steffen Dittes
Parliamentary constituencies
Member of the Bundestag for Thuringia
In office 26 October 2021 – 25 March 2025
Preceded by	Martina Renner
Constituency	The Left List
Member of the Landtag of Thuringia
In office 29 September 2009 – 5 November 2021
Preceded by	Michael Panse
Succeeded by	Donata Vogtschmidt
Constituency	Erfurt II
In office 8 July 2004 – 29 September 2009
Preceded by	multi-member district
Succeeded by	multi-member district
Constituency	The Left List

Personal details
- Born: Susanne Hennig; 13 October 1977 (age 49) Demmin, Bezirk Neubrandenburg, East Germany (now Germany)
- Party: The Left (2007–)
- Other political affiliations: Party of Democratic Socialism (–2007)
- Children: 1
- Education: University of Erfurt

Susanne Hennig-Wellsow (born Hennig on 13 October 1977) is a German politician. She was federal co-chairwoman of The Left from 2021 to 2022 and was a member of the Bundestag for Thuringia from 2021 till 2025. Previously, she was a member of the Landtag of Thuringia from 2004 to 2021, leader of the Thuringia branch of The Left since November 2013, and leader of the state parliamentary group since December 2014.

== Early life and education ==
Hennig-Wellsow was born Susanne Hennig in Demmin in 1977, then a town in East Germany. Her father did military service in the National People's Army and subsequently worked as a truck driver and police officer. Her mother was a registrar and worked in the Ministry of the Interior from the mid-1990s. Hennig graduated from Erfurt Sports High School in 1996. From 1984 to 1999, she was a competitive athlete in speed skating. In 1996, Hennig began studying educational science at the University of Erfurt, which she completed in 2001 as a graduate teacher. Hennig-Wellsow is married, has one child, and lives in Erfurt.

== Political career ==
In 2001, Hennig began working for the Party of Democratic Socialism (PDS) parliamentary group as a research assistant for education and the media. In the 2004 Thuringian state election, she was elected to the Landtag on the PDS party list. Hennig became a member of The Left after the PDS merged into the new party, alongside left-wing dissidents (Labour and Social Justice – The Electoral Alternative) from the Social Democratic Party of Germany (SPD) in 2007. At this time, she co-founded the internal Anti-Capitalist Left faction but later left.

In the 2009 Thurinigian state election, Hennig was re-elected to the Landtag, this time as member for the Erfurt II constituency; she defeated incumbent Christian Democratic Union of Germany (CDU) deputy Michael Panse to win the seat. In November 2011, Hennig became deputy leader of the Thuringia branch of The Left.

At the Left party conference in Suhl held from 16 to 17 November 2013, Hennig was elected leader of the party. She won 76 of 134 delegate votes (56.7%) against two other candidates. She was re-elected to the Landtag as representative for Erfurt II in the 2014 Thuringian state election, winning 31.0% of votes.

After Bodo Ramelow was elected Minister-President in December 2014, Hennig-Wellsow succeeded him as leader of the Left parliamentary group. At a party conference in Gotha in November 2015, she was re-elected as party leader with 75.4% of votes. This was met with controversy, as it is unusual within The Left for the leadership of both the party and parliamentary group to be held by the same person. An amendment to prevent this practice was proposed but defeated, and Hennig-Wellsow retained both positions. She was re-elected once again in 2017 with 85% of votes. Hennig-Wellsow was re-elected to the Landtag in the 2019 Thuringian state election with an increased majority of 32.7%. Two weeks later in November, she was re-elected as party leader.

In September 2020, Hennig-Wellsow announced her candidacy for the co-leadership of the federal Left party. She also welcomed the candidacy of Janine Wissler, and expressed her hope for the election of an all-female co-leadership. She stated that she would move out of state politics and seek election to the Bundestag if confirmed as party chair. Hennig-Wellsow was elected federal co-chairwoman at a party conference on 27 February 2021, winning 70.5% of votes cast.

Hennig-Wellsow was The Left's candidate for Erfurt – Weimar – Weimarer Land II in the 2021 German federal election. She was elected as candidate with 93% of votes. She chose not to seek her party's lead candidacy in the federal election, stating that her focus was on winning the Erfurt-Weimar constituency and preparing the party for a possible red–red–green coalition (R2G). Hennig-Wellsow won 16.4% of votes in the election, placing fourth. She was elected to the Bundestag in first position on the Thuringia state list.

On 20 April 2022, Hennig-Wellsow resigned as co-leader with immediate effect. She cited personal reasons and the party's poor handling of accusations of sexism within its ranks. She also stated that the party needed new faces for a renewal.

Hennig-Wellsow announced in December 2024 that she would not be seeking re-election in the 2025 German federal election.

== Political positions ==
Hennig-Wellsow is considered to be on the pragmatic wing of The Left, and describes herself as supporting a "radical Realpolitik". She is particularly open to cooperation with other parties, and has voiced strong support for her party's involvement in the federal government, stating: "If you don't show that you want to govern, you will never succeed." She has expressed preference for a R2G coalition with the SPD and Alliance 90/The Greens but stated that her primary goal is a federal government without the CDU/CSU.

Contrary to The Left's longstanding policy, Hennig-Wellsow does not support German withdrawal from NATO. She has also taken a more hostile attitude toward Russia than others in her party, including in regards to Russian actions in Ukraine and Syria, and the poisoning of Alexei Navalny.

== Assessment ==
Hennig-Wellsow is considered adept at negotiation and mediation. As party leader in Thuringia, she played a key role in the formation and development of the R2G governments of Ramelow. She is also noted for her bold, sometimes aggressive tone; during the 2019 state election campaign, she coined the phrase "Bodo or barbarism!", which became a slogan of the Left's campaign. On one occasion during the 2020 Thuringian government crisis, Hennig-Wellsow responded to CDU demands with the message: "Our view remains: the first ballot has to pass with a democratic majority. Otherwise we won't put Bodo Ramelow up. OK. Good day!" Nonetheless, she played a key role in negotiating the "constructive opposition" agreement with the CDU. Deutschlandfunk described her as "almost the only one who gave the impression that she had a clear plan".

Hennig-Wellsow rose to national prominence during the February 2020 government crisis in Thuringia. After Thomas Kemmerich (Free Democratic Party) was controversially elected Minister-President with the support of Alternative for Germany, the leaders of the parliamentary groups were invited to congratulate him and present him with a bouquet of flowers. As the leader of the largest group, Hennig-Wellsow was the first in line; however, she refused to shake his hand, instead dropping the bouquet at his feet and walking away in protest. The incident was widely reported nationally and internationally, becoming the most iconic image of the crisis. RND described it as "a moment for the history books".

Hennig-Wellsow was widely criticized for an interview she conducted on 4 March 2021, during which she asserted that she was against the German military being involved in "combat missions" abroad but was unable to say how many active combat missions Germany was engaged in at that time and tried to appeal to a member of staff for assistance answering further questions about German military activity. Hennig-Wellsow received further criticism for her interview with Markus Lanz, aired on 31 March 2021, during which she struggled to answer basic facts about The Left's tax proposals.
