= Thomas Hoffmann =

German politician (born 1979)

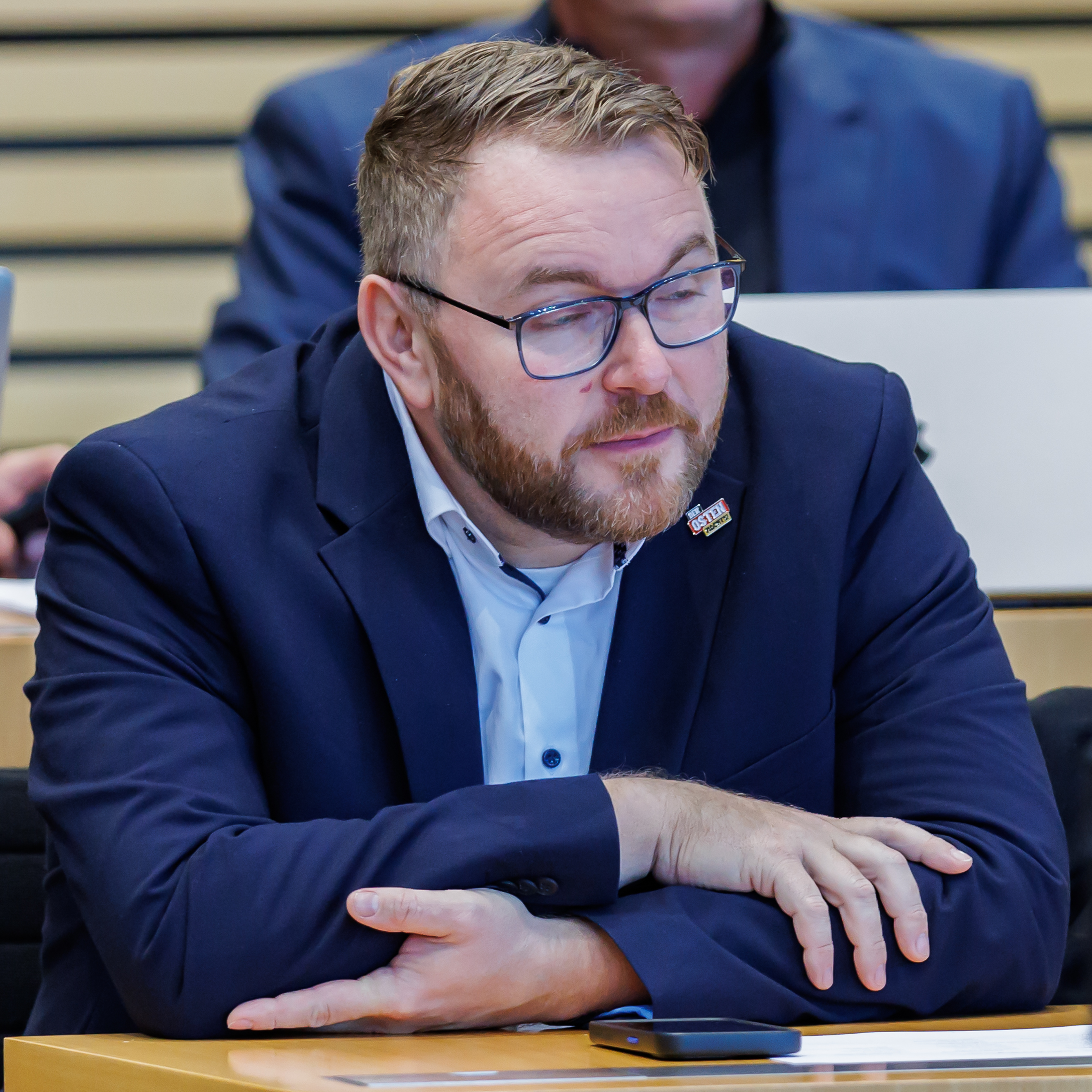
- Hoffmann in 2024

Member of the Landtag of Thuringia
- Incumbent
- Assumed office 26 September 2024
- Preceded by: Thomas Rudy
- Constituency: Altenburger Land I

Personal details
- Born: 1979 (age 46–47) Altenburg
- Party: Alternative for Germany

Thomas Hoffmann (born 1979 in Altenburg) is a German politician serving as a member of the Landtag of Thuringia since 2024. He is the group leader of the Alternative for Germany in the district council of Altenburger Land.
