= Denis Häußer =

German politician (born 1974)

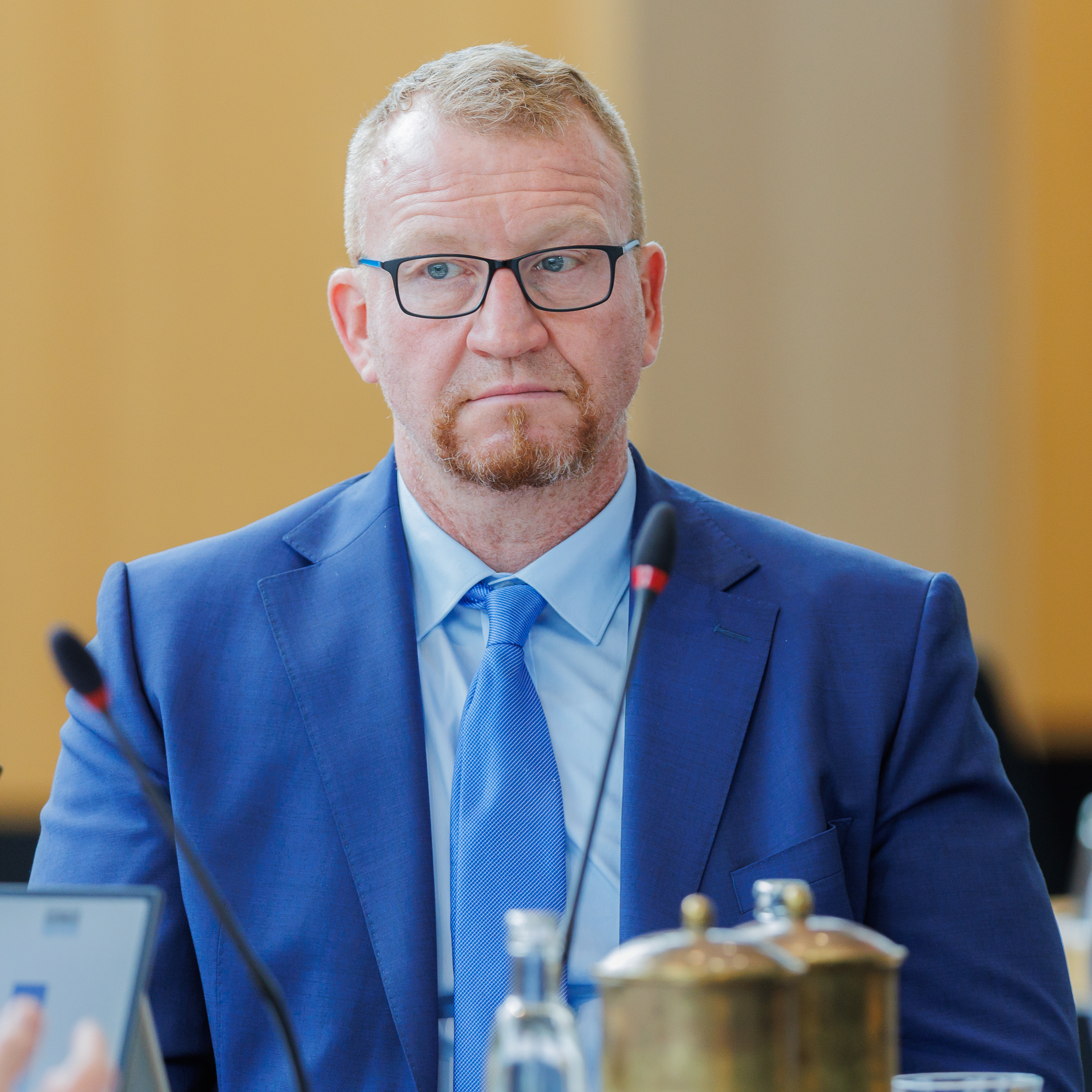
- Häußer in 2024

Member of the Landtag of Thuringia
- Incumbent
- Assumed office 26 September 2024
- Preceded by: Maik Kowalleck
- Constituency: Saalfeld-Rudolstadt II

Personal details
- Born: 1974 (age 51–52)
- Party: Alternative for Germany (since 2013)

Denis Häußer (born 1974) is a German politician serving as a member of the Landtag of Thuringia since 2024. He has been a city councillor of Saalfeld and a district councillor of Saalfeld-Rudolstadt since 2019. He is a member of Alternative for Germany.
