= Thomas Benninghaus =

German politician (born 1973)

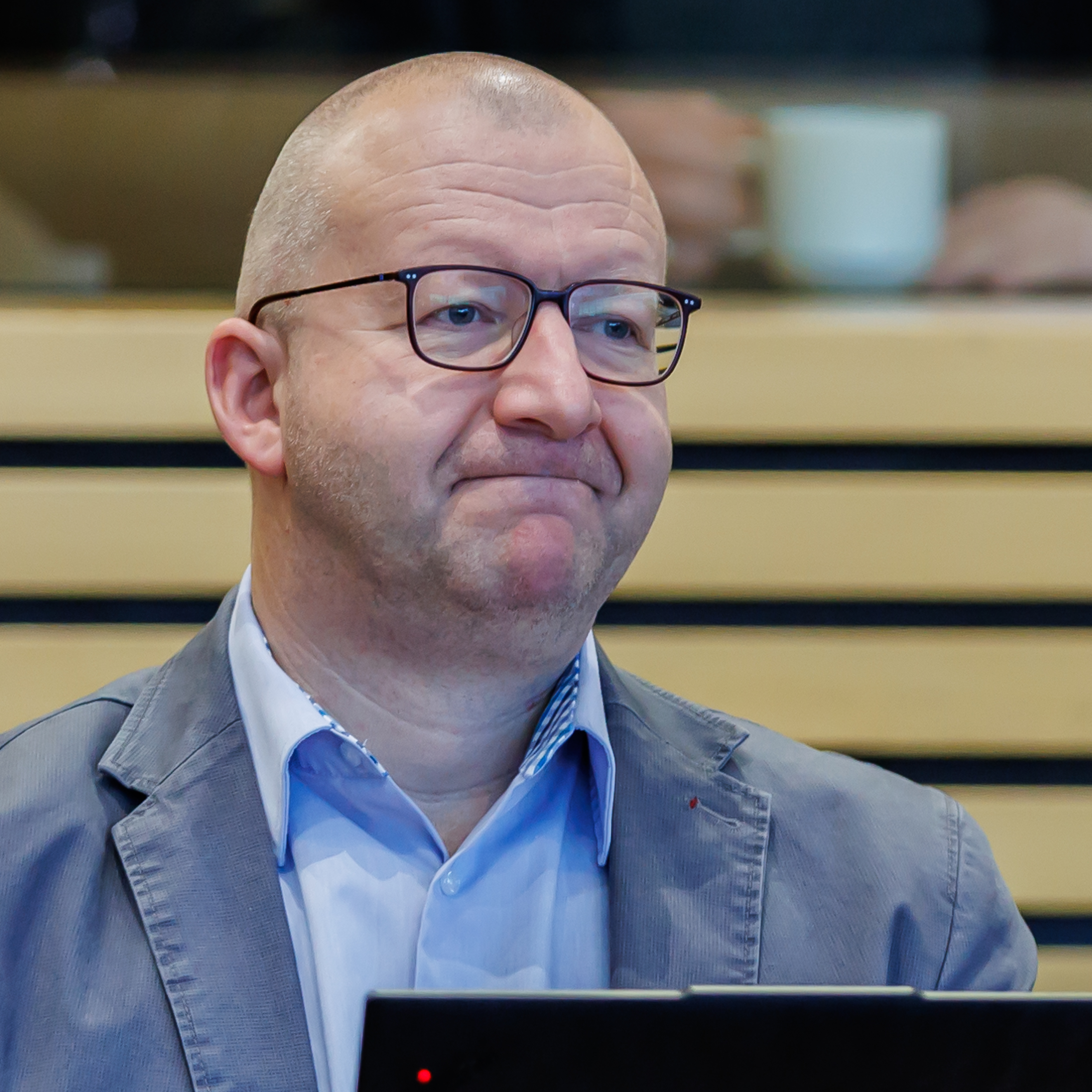
- Benninghaus in 2024

Member of the Landtag of Thuringia
- Incumbent
- Assumed office 26 September 2024
- Preceded by: Karlheinz Frosch
- Constituency: Saalfeld-Rudolstadt I

Personal details
- Born: 1973 (age 52–53) Rudolstadt
- Party: Alternative for Germany

Thomas Benninghaus (born 1973 in Rudolstadt) is a German politician serving as a member of the Landtag of Thuringia since 2024. He is the chairman of the Alternative for Germany in Saalfeld-Rudolstadt.
