= Gudrun Lukin =

German politician

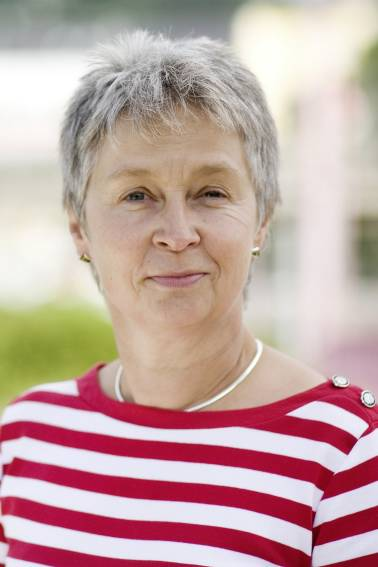
- Gudrun Lukin

Member of the Landtag of Thuringia
- Incumbent
- Assumed office 2009

Personal details
- Born: 29 December 1954 (age 71) Jena, East Germany (Now Germany)
- Party: The Left (Germany)
- Education: University of Jena

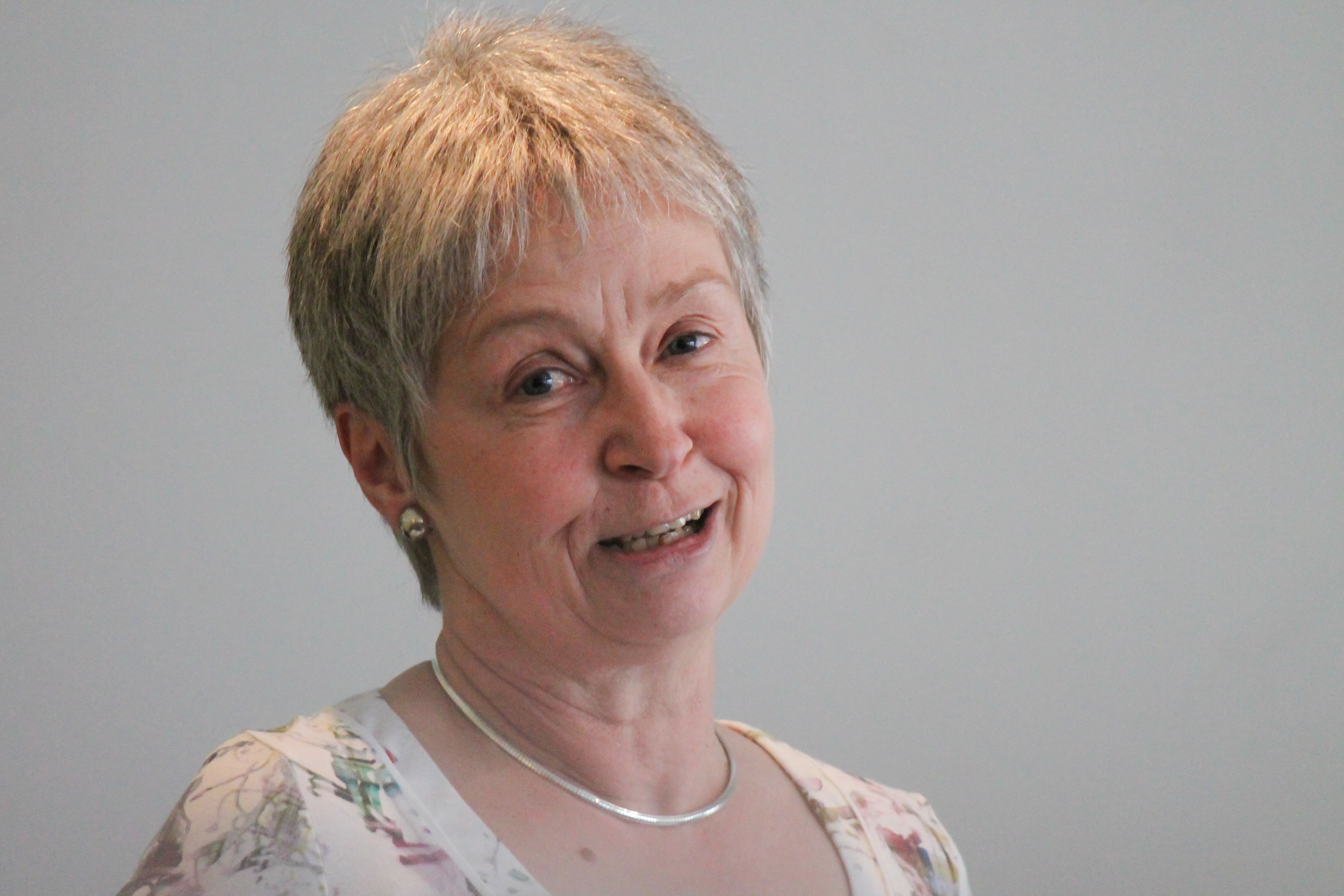
Lukin during a lecture (2013)

Gudrun Martha Lukin (born 29 December 1954 in Jena) is a German politician and since 2009 a member of the Landtag of Thuringia representing The Left.

== Career ==
After her Abitur, which she completed in Halle (Saale) in 1973, Lukin studied Marxist–Leninist philosophy in Rostov-on-Don from 1973 to 1978. From 1978 she worked as a research assistant at the Institute for Philosophy at the University of Jena (FSU). She received her doctorate in 1985 from FSU Jena with her thesis The Development of Philosophical Concepts by Plato and Aristotle.

In 1973 Lukin joined the Socialist Unity Party of Germany and in 1984 worked in the office of the mayor of Jena. In 1991 she became a constituency worker for the PDS and in 1995 became the regional worker for the PDS in Thuringia. In 1999 she became a city councillor for the PDS and was from 2003 until 2009 the district chairwoman in Jena for her party (since 2007, The Left). In 2004, 2009 and 2014 she was re-elected as city councillor. In 2006 she was a candidate in the mayoral race for Jena. In the first round of the mayoral election in September 2006 she received 24.97%, placing third, 6.13% behind Christoph Schwind (CDU) and 1.55% behind the eventual winner, Albrecht Schröter (SPD).

In the 2009 Thuringian state election she was a direct candidate in Voting District Jena II against the incumbent Thuringian culture minister Bernward Müller and prevailed with 29.1% of the vote. In the 2014 election she successfully defended her direct mandate.

Lukin's volunteer activities include serving as a board member for Jena Women's House e.V., as a member of ver.di, and with Help for the Children of Chernobyl e.V. Since 1999 she has been active in the Jena Alliance Against the Right, since 2002 in the Jena Peace Alliance, and since 2004 in the Jena Alliance against Welfare Cuts, created as a result of Hartz-4 laws regarding unemployment insurance. Since 2011 she is the chairwoman for Landesverkehrswacht Thüringen e.V.

== Literature ==
- Gudrun Lukin, Die Herausbildung des Philosophiebegriffes bei Platon und Aristoteles, Dissertation, Jena 1985
