= Lena Saniye Güngör =

German politician (born 1993)

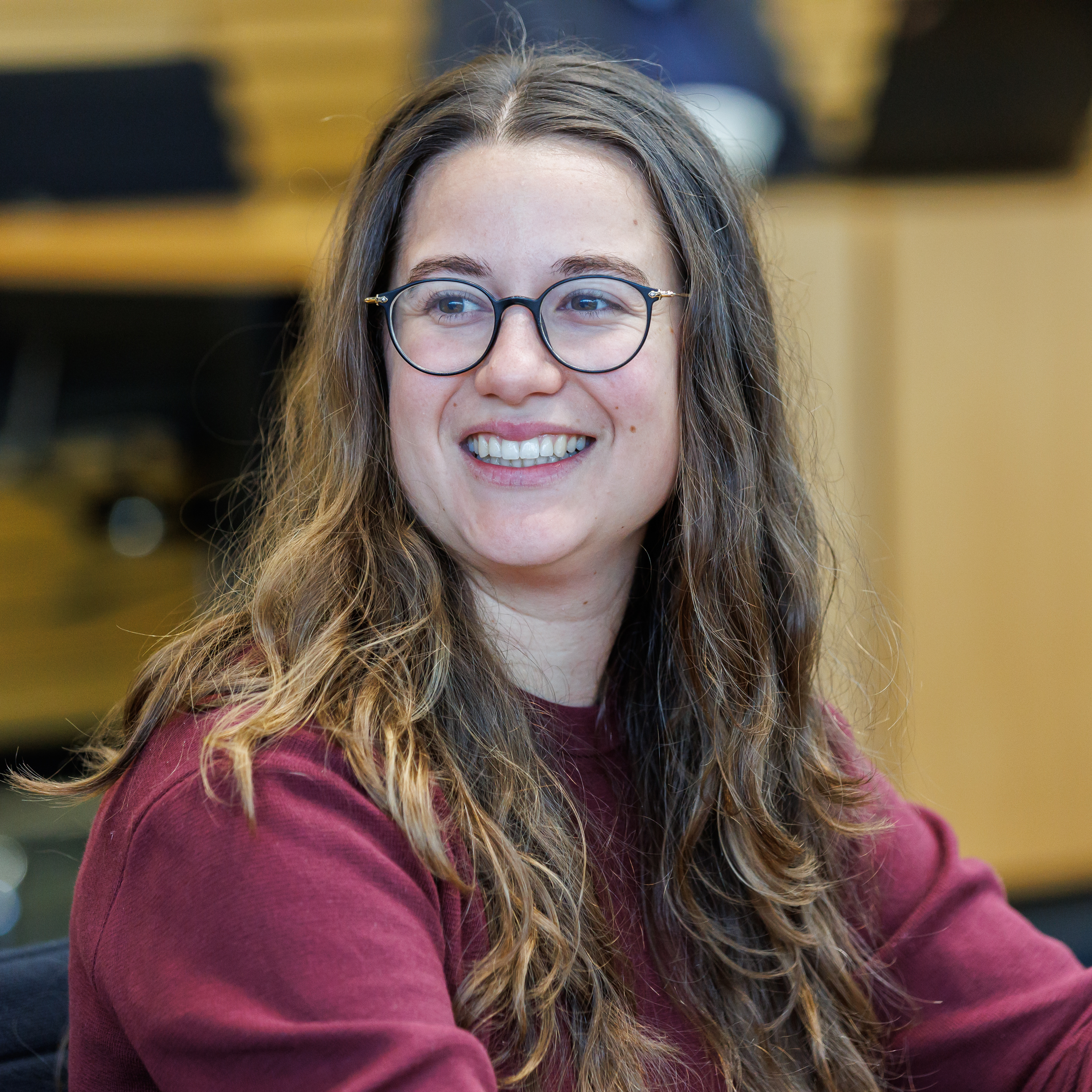
- Güngör in 2024

Member of the Landtag of Thuringia
- Incumbent
- Assumed office 26 November 2019
- Constituency: Jena II (2024–present)

Personal details
- Born: 29 December 1993 (age 32) Dortmund
- Party: Die Linke (since 2017)

Lena Saniye Güngör (born 29 December 1993 in Dortmund) is a German politician serving as a member of the Landtag of Thuringia since 2019. She has served as vice president of the Landtag since 2024.
