= Niklas Waßmann =

German politician (born 1985)

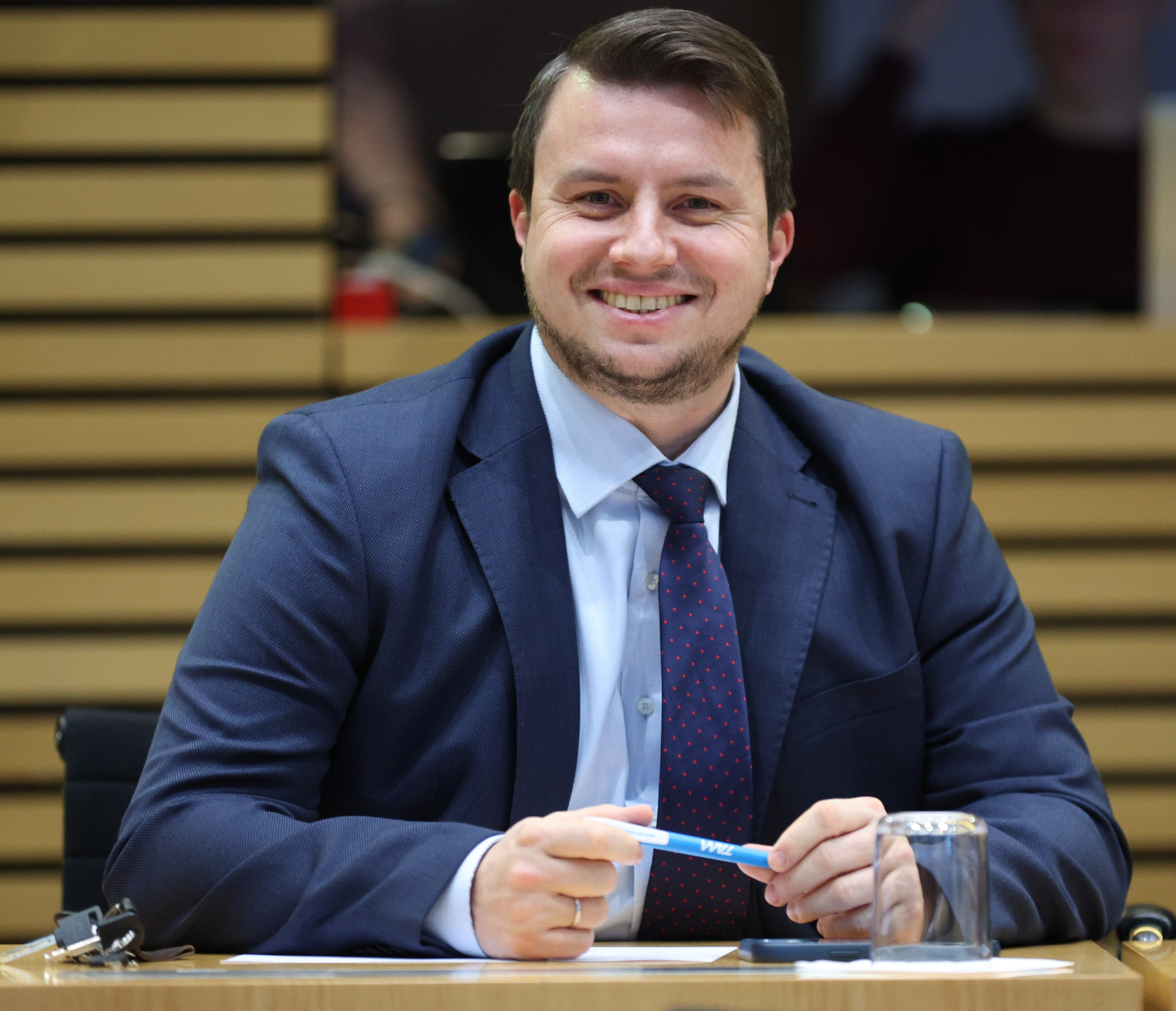
- Waßmann in 2024

Member of the Landtag of Thuringia
- Incumbent
- Assumed office 26 September 2024

Personal details
- Born: 1985 (age 40–41) Eschwege
- Party: Christian Democratic Union

Niklas Waßmann (born 1985 in Eschwege) is a German politician serving as a member of the Landtag of Thuringia since 2024. He has served as secretary general of the Christian Democratic Union in Thuringia since 2024.
