= Katharina König-Preuss =

German politician (born 1978)

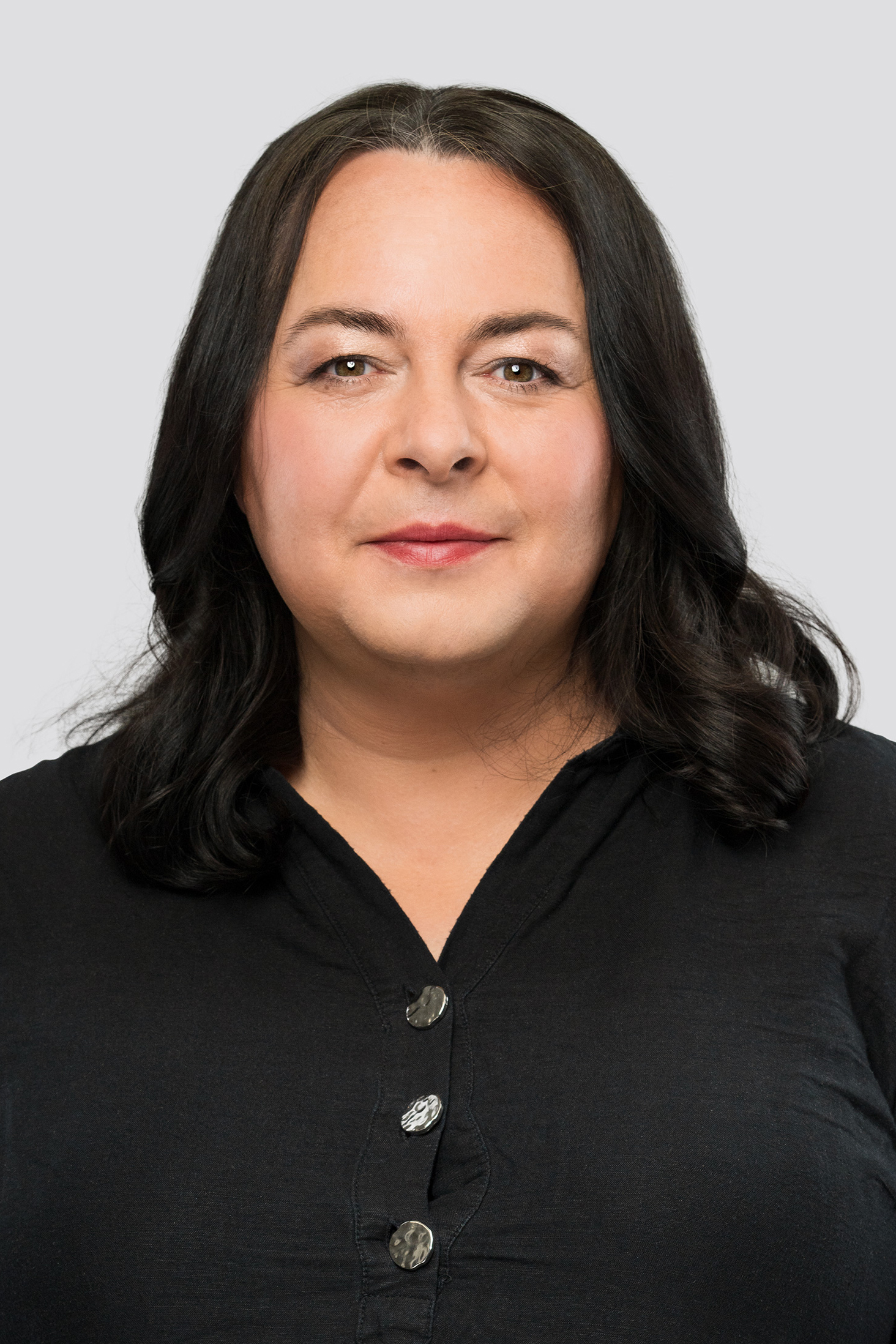
- König-Preuss in 2024

Member of the Landtag of Thuringia
- Incumbent
- Assumed office 29 September 2009

Personal details
- Born: 7 April 1978 (age 48) Erfurt
- Party: Die Linke (since 2007)
- Other political affiliations: Party of Democratic Socialism (2004–2007)
- Parent: Lothar König (father)
- Relatives: Tilman and Karl-Friedrich König (brothers)

Katharina König-Preuss (born 7 April 1978 in Erfurt) is a German politician serving as a member of the Landtag of Thuringia since 2024. From 2004 to 2024, she was a city councillor of Jena.
