= Lutz Liebscher =

German politician (born 1985)

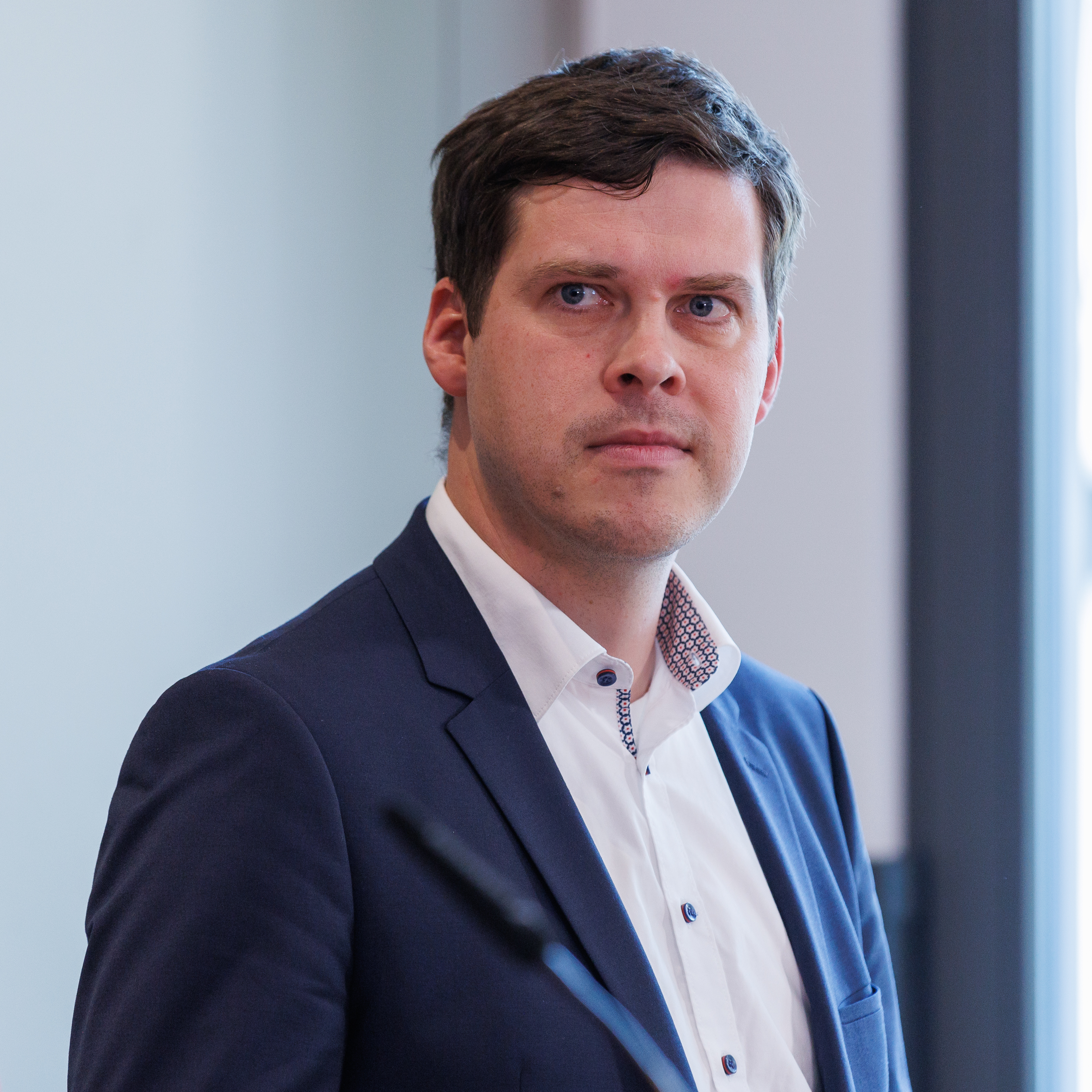
- Liebscher in 2024

Member of the Landtag of Thuringia
- Incumbent
- Assumed office 26 November 2019

Personal details
- Born: 13 March 1985 (age 41)
- Party: Social Democratic Party

Lutz Liebscher (born 13 March 1985) is a German politician serving as a member of the Landtag of Thuringia since 2019. He has served as group leader of the Social Democratic Party since 2024.
