= Elisabeth Mengel-Stähle =

German politician (born 1982)

Member of the Landtag of Thuringia
- Incumbent
- Assumed office 26 March 2025
- Preceded by: Torben Braga

Personal details
- Born: 1982 (age 43–44)
- Party: Alternative for Germany

Elisabeth Mengel-Stähle (born 1982) is a German politician serving as a member of the Landtag of Thuringia since 2025. She is the spokesperson for family policy of the Alternative for Germany group in the Landtag.
