= Christoph Matschie =

German politician

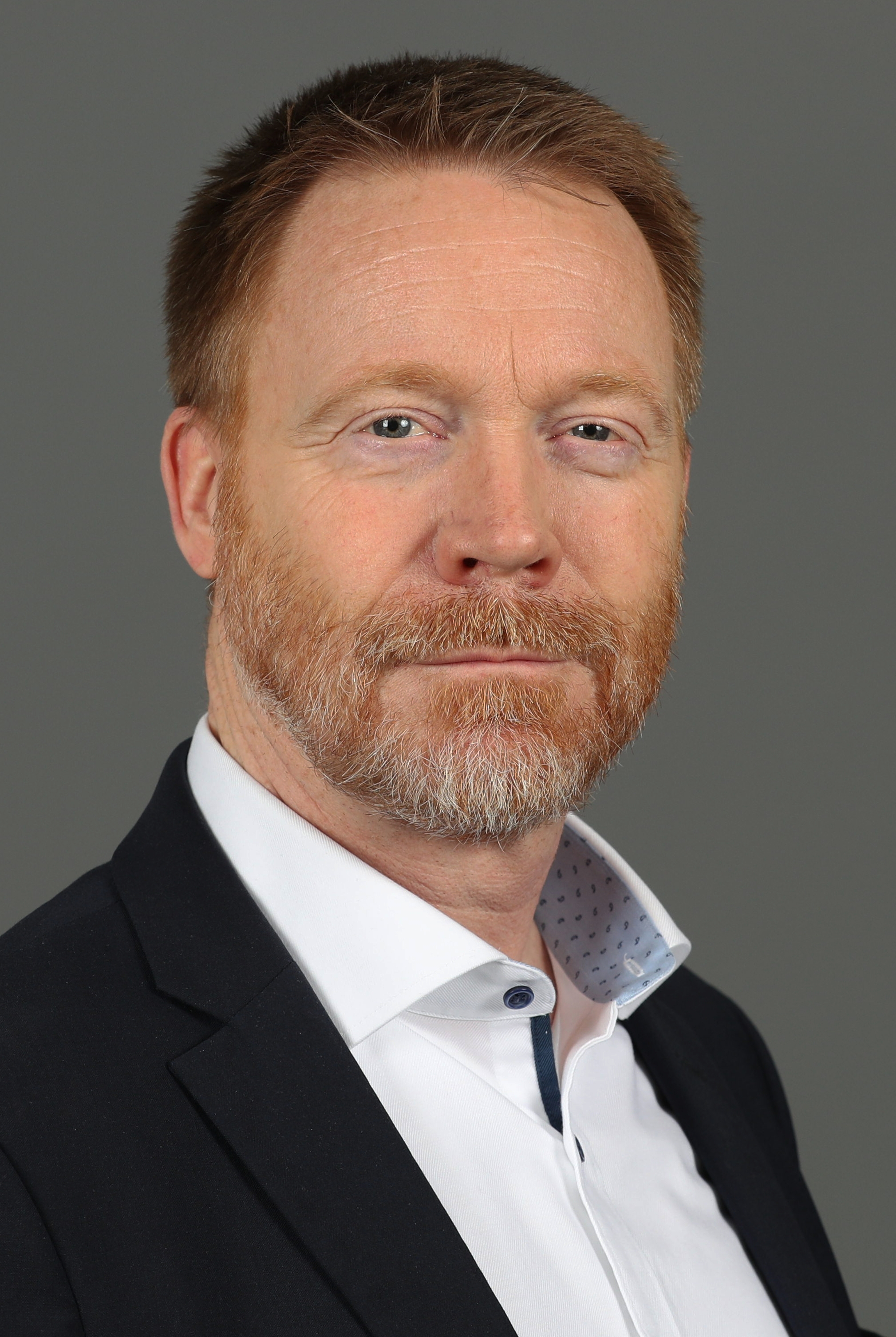

Member of the Bundestag
- In office 2017–2021

Member of the Bundestag
- In office 1990–2004

Personal details
- Born: 15 July 1961 (age 65) Mühlhausen, Bezirk Erfurt, East Germany (now Germany)
- Citizenship: German
- Party: Social Democratic Party (SPD)
- Children: 2
- Education: University of Rostock; University of Jena

Christoph Matschie (born 15 July 1961 in Mühlhausen) is a German politician of the Social Democratic Party (SPD) who served as Deputy Minister-President of Thuringia between 2009 and 2014. He was also a member of the Bundestag from 1999 to 2004 and from 2017 to 2021.

== Early life and career ==
Matschie grew up in East Germany. From 1984 to 1989 he studied Theology at the University of Rostock and the University of Jena and earned a diploma.

== Political career ==
Matschie joined the newly founded Social Democratic Party of East Germany in October 1989. Following the German reunification Matschie became a member of the SPD.

=== Member of Parliament, 1990–2004 ===
Matschie was a member of the Bundestag from 1990 to 2004. During the legislative period from 1998 to 2002 he was a member of the federal executive board of his party's group in the Bundestag. From 1998 until 2002, he chaired the Committee on the Environment, Nature Conservation and Nuclear Safety. Following the 2002 elections, he joined the government of Chancellor Gerhard Schröder as Parliamentary State Secretary at the Federal Ministry for Education and Research, under the leadership of Minister Edelgard Bulmahn.

=== Career in state politics, 1999–2017 ===
Matschie served as chairman of the SPD in Thuringia from 1999 until 2014. He co-chaired the SPD’s national conventions in Bochum (2003), Berlin (2004) and Hamburg (2007).

Matschie was his party's candidate for Minister-President at the State elections of 2004 and 2009. The SPD remained third strongest party in the state, but managed to form a coalition government with the Christian Democratic Union in 2009. Matschie became State Minister for Education, Youth and Sport as well as Deputy Minister-President in the government of Minister-President Christine Lieberknecht.

In the negotiations to form a Grand Coalition of Chancellor Angela Merkel's Christian Democrats and the SPD following the 2013 federal elections, Matschie was part of the SPD delegation in the working group on education and research policy, led by Johanna Wanka and Doris Ahnen.

In the Landtag of Thuringia, Matschie later served on the Budget and Finance Committee.

=== Member of Parliament, 2017–2021 ===
Matschie was re-elected to the Bundestag in the 2017 elections. He served on the Committee on Foreign Affairs and its Sub-Committee on the United Nations.

In September 2020, Matschie announced that he would not stand in the 2021 federal elections but instead resign from active politics by the end of the parliamentary term.

== Other activities ==
- Friedrich Ebert Foundation (FES), Member
- Helaba, Member of the Supervisory Board (2012-2015)

== Personal life ==
From 1997 until 2010, Matschie was married to Ethiopian-born political scientist and aid worker Mitslal Kifleyesus. They have two children.
