= 2009 Thuringian state election =

State election in Thuringia, Germany

2009 Thuringia state election
← 2004	30 August 2009	2014 →

All 88 seats of the Landtag of Thuringia
- Registered: 1,910,074 ▼2.5%
- Turnout: 1,054,297 (56.2%) ▲2.4 pp
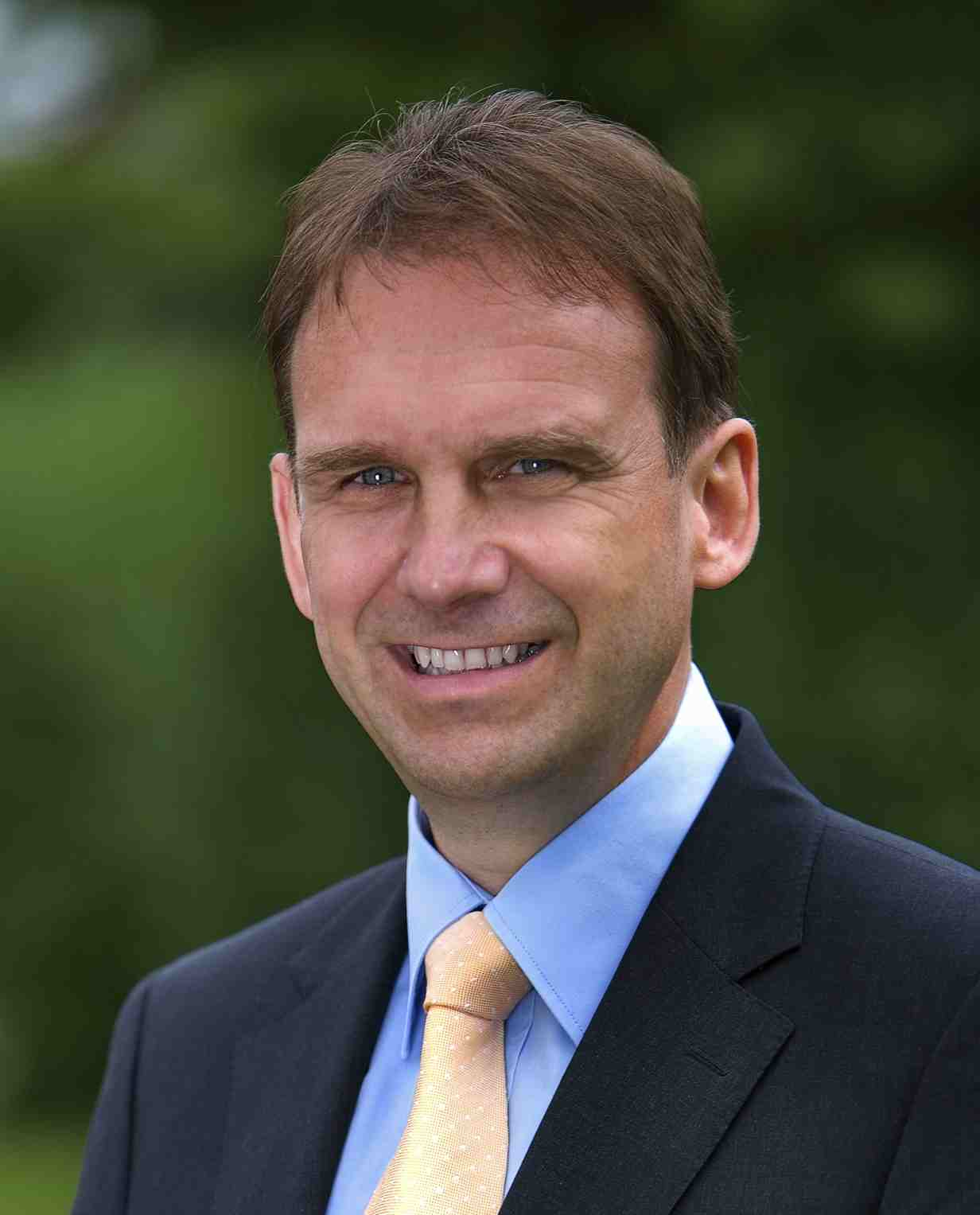

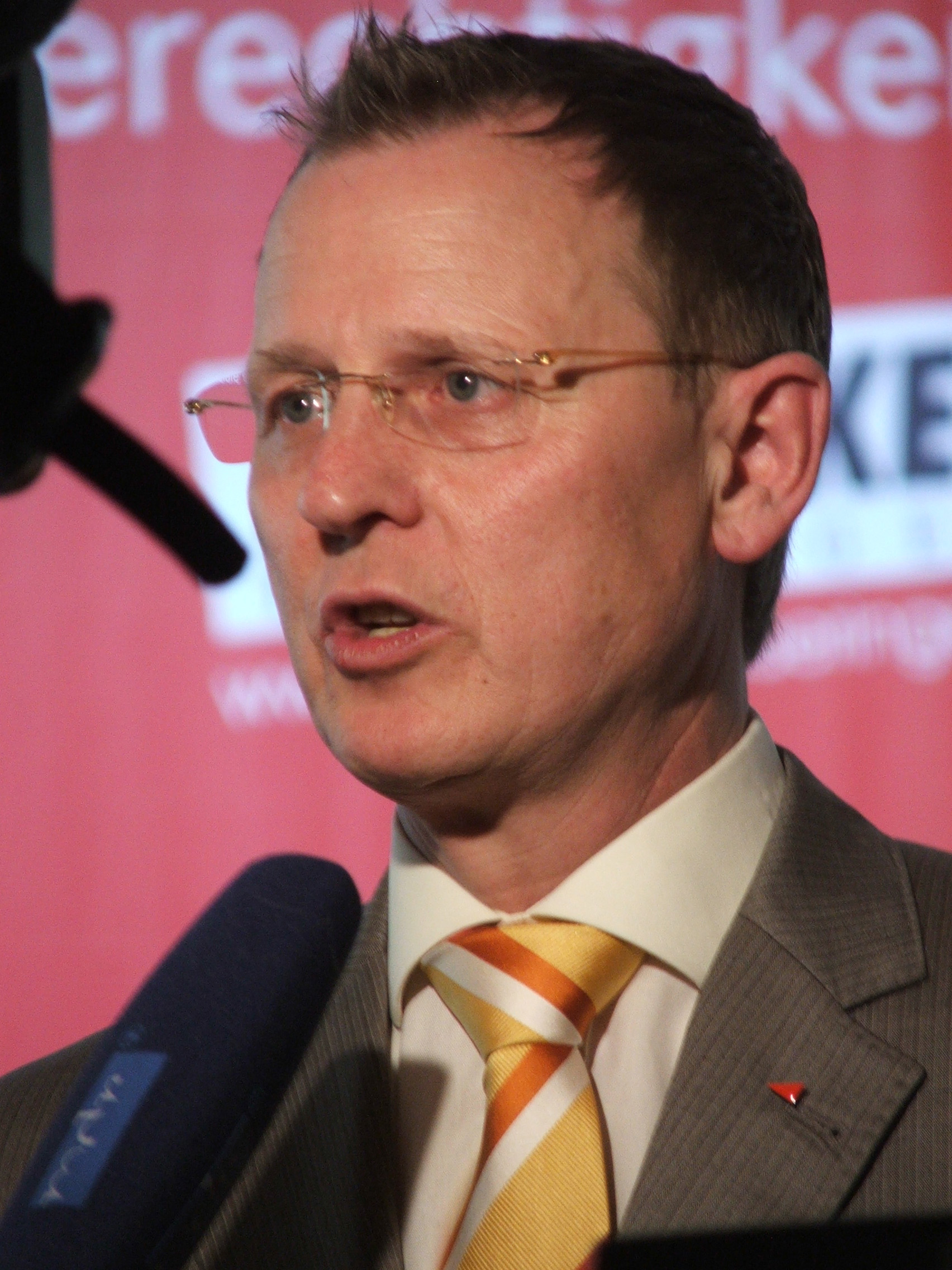

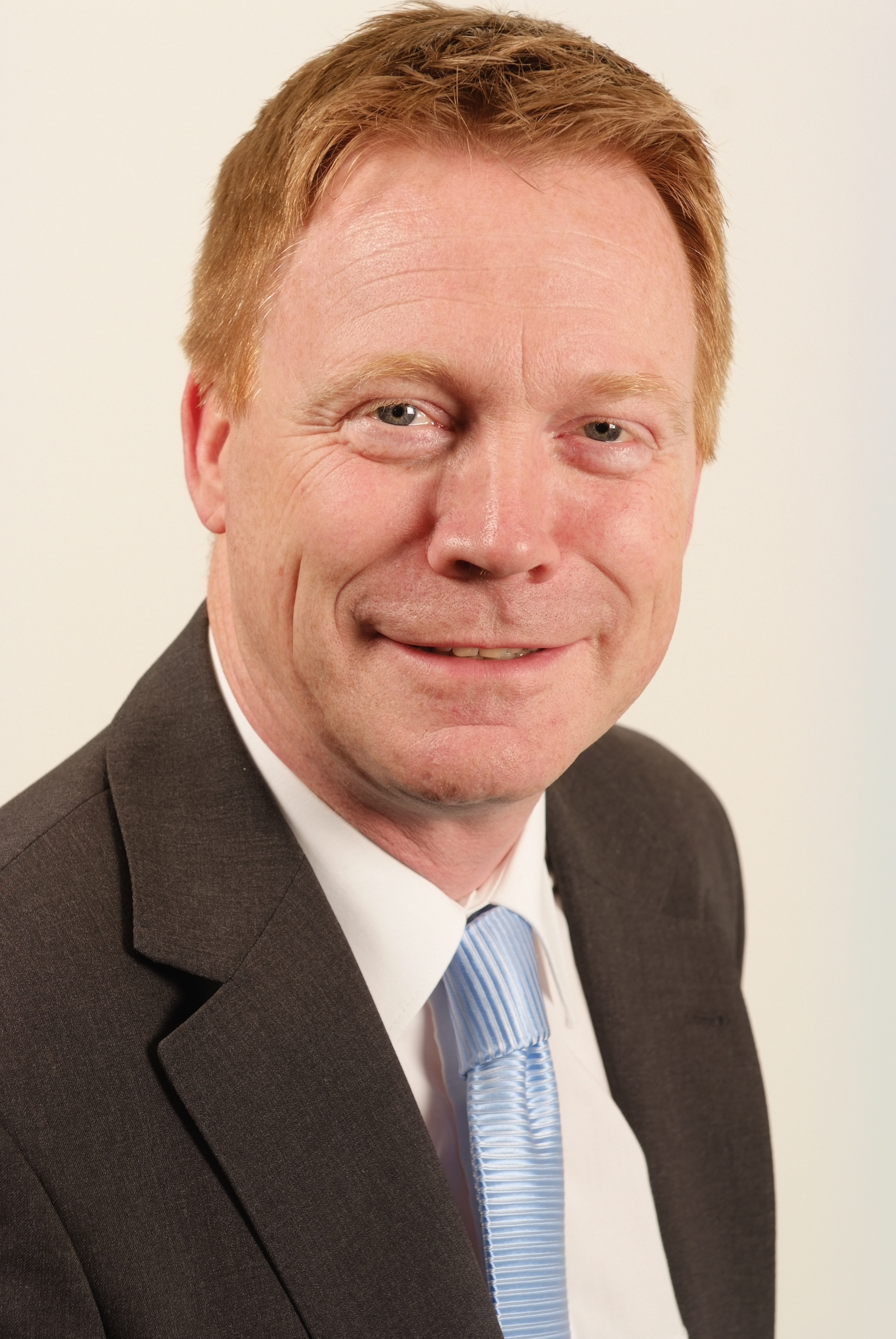

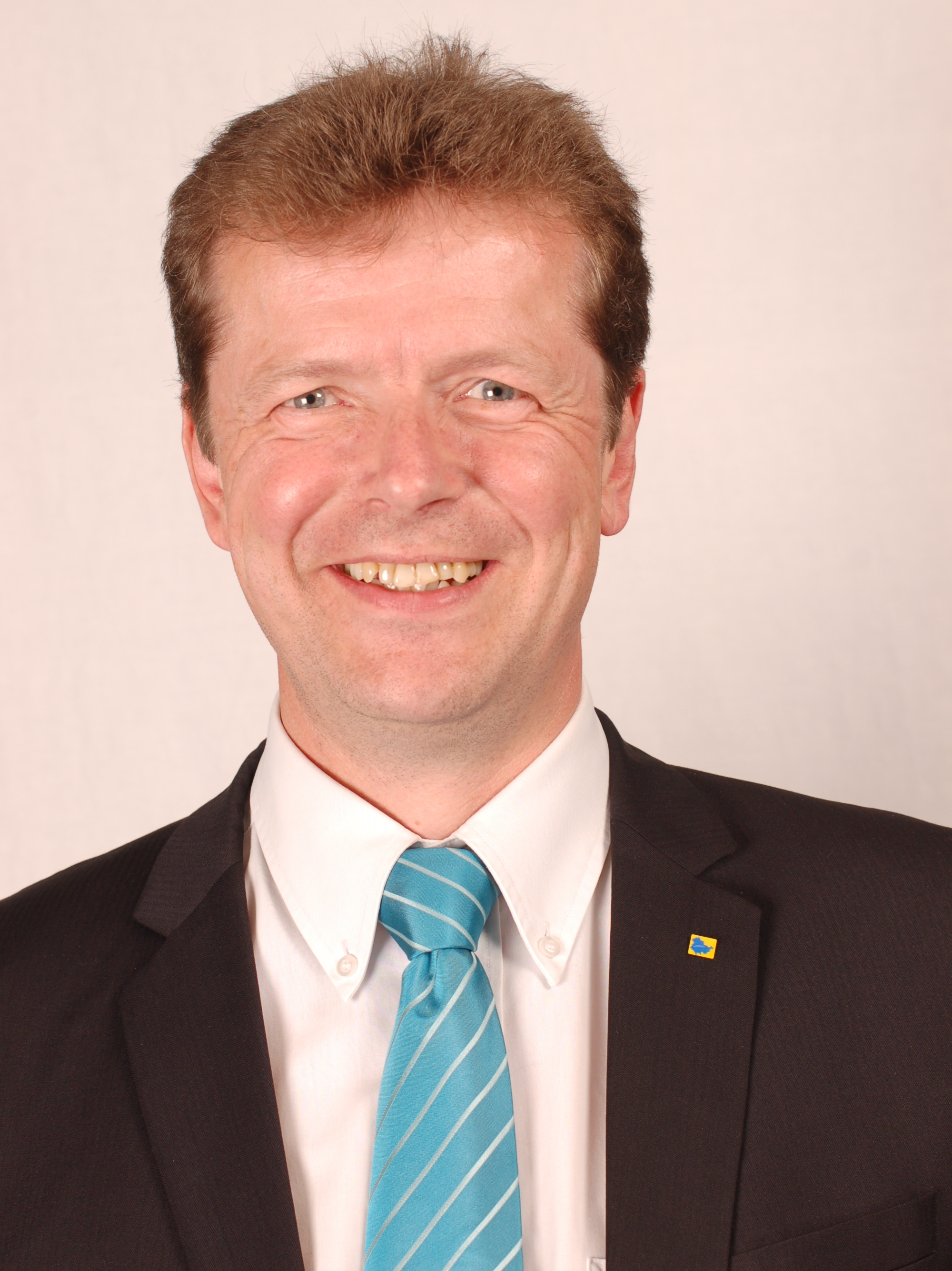

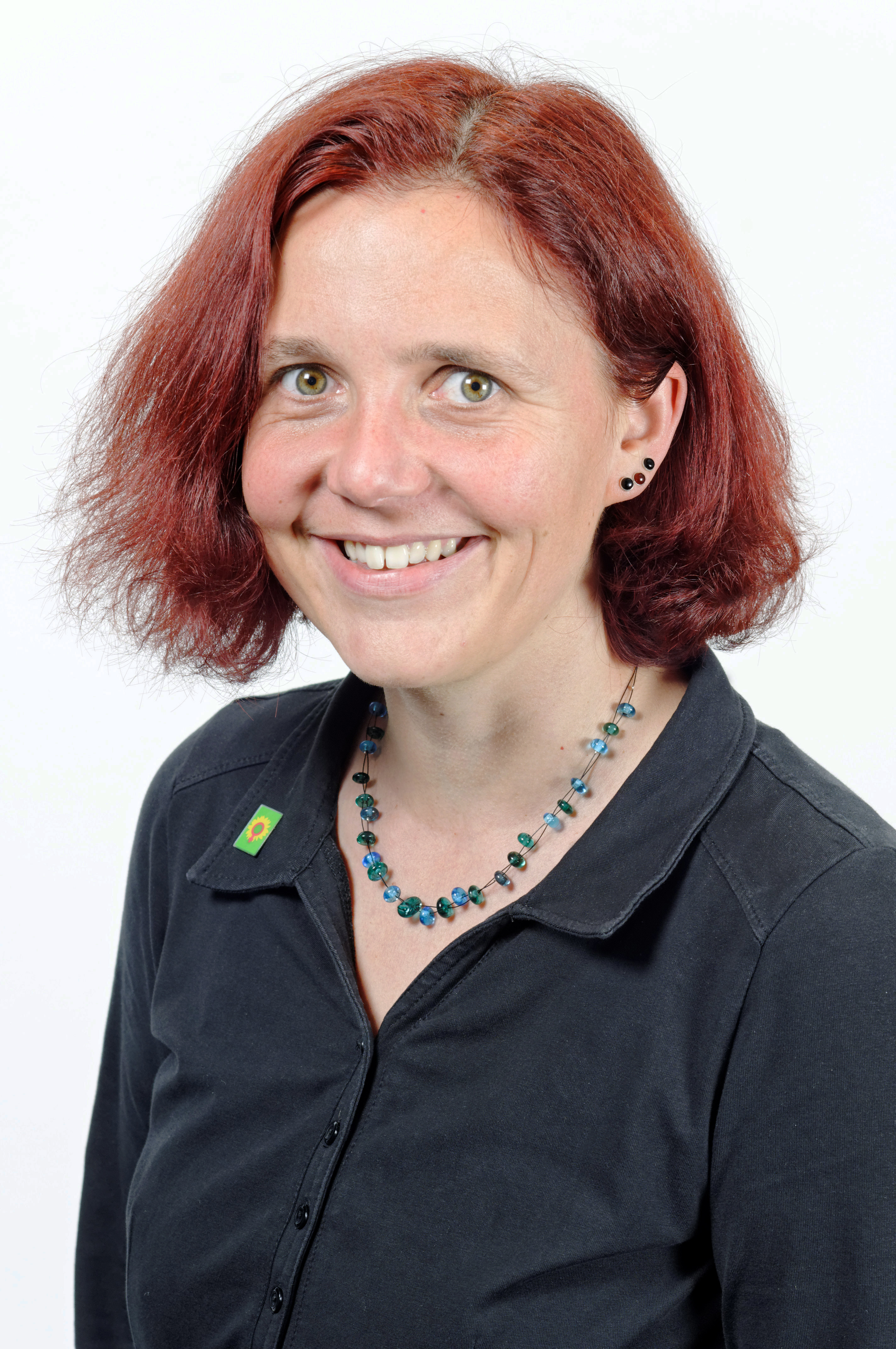
	First party	Second party	Third party
Leader	Dieter Althaus	Bodo Ramelow	Christoph Matschie
Party	CDU	Left	SPD
Leader's seat	Eichsfeld I	Erfurt III (won seat)	Jena I (won seat)
Last election	45 seats, 43.0%	28 seats, 26.1% (Note: Results for PDS.)	15 seats, 14.5%
Seats won	30	27	18
Seat change	▼15	▼1	▲3
Popular vote	329,302	288,915	195,363
Percentage	31.2%	27.4%	18.5%
Swing	▼11.8 pp	▲1.3 pp	▲4.0 pp
	Fourth party	Fifth party
Leader	Uwe Barth	Astrid Rothe-Beinlich
Party	FDP	Greens
Leader's seat	List (Note: Ran in Jena I (lost).)	List (Note: Ran in Erfurt II (lost).)
Last election	0 seats, 3.6%	0 seats, 4.5%
Seats won	7	6
Seat change	▲7	▲6
Popular vote	80,600	64,912
Percentage	7.6%	6.2%
Swing	▲4.0 pp	▲1.7 pp
- Results for the single-member constituencies
Minister-President before election
Dieter Althaus
CDU
Elected Minister-President
Christine Lieberknecht
CDU

The 2009 Thuringian state election was held on 30 August 2009 to elect the members of the 5th Landtag of Thuringia. It was held on the same day as the 2009 Saarland state election and the 2009 Saxony state election. The incumbent Christian Democratic Union (CDU) government led by Minister-President Dieter Althaus was defeated. The CDU subsequently formed a grand coalition with the Social Democratic Party (SPD). Althaus resigned after the election due to his party's poor performance, which was far below expectations. He was succeeded by fellow CDU member Christine Lieberknecht, who was elected as the new Minister-President.

== Parties ==
The table below lists parties represented in the 4th Landtag of Thuringia.

Name		Ideology	Leader(s)	2004 result	
Name		Ideology	Leader(s)	Votes (%)	Seats
CDU	Christian Democratic Union of Germany; Christlich Demokratische Union Deutschlands	Christian democracy	Dieter Althaus	43.0%	45 / 88
Linke	The Left; Die Linke	Democratic socialism	Bodo Ramelow	26.1% (Note: Results for PDS.)	28 / 88
SPD	Social Democratic Party of Germany; Sozialdemokratische Partei Deutschlands	Social democracy	Christoph Matschie	14.5%	15 / 88

== Opinion polling ==
Polling firm	Fieldwork date	Sample size	CDU	Linke	SPD	Grüne	FDP	Others	Lead
2009 state election	30 Aug 2009	–	31.2	27.4	18.5	6.2	7.6	9.1	3.8
TU Ilumenau	10–22 Aug 2009	369	41	23	15	10	8	3	18
Forschungsgruppe Wahlen	17–20 Aug 2009	~1,000	35	25	18	5	10	7	10
Infratest dimap	18–20 Aug 2009	1,000	34	24	19	6	8	9	10
IfM Leipzig	10–13 Aug 2009	805	37	23	20	5	9	6	14
Infratest dimap	7–11 Aug 2009	1,000	34	24	20	6	9	7	10
Forsa	13–24 Jul 2009	1,004	40	24	16	6	6	8	16
Infratest dimap	19–23 Jun 2009	1,000	36	24	18	6	9	7	12
IfM Leipzig	11–13 May 2009	801	36	23	23	5	8	5	13
Forsa	4–15 May 2009	1,005	40	26	18	4	6	6	14
Infratest dimap	8–12 May 2009	1,000	39	25	20	5	6	5	14
Infratest dimap	18–22 Mar 2009	1,000	36	25	20	5	8	6	11
GESS	4–7 Mar 2009	1,004	39	25	18	4	8	6	14
Forsa	12–16 Jan 2009	751	39	28	16	5	5	7	11
IfM Leipzig	21–23 Oct 2008	805	33	30	18	5	6	7	3
Forsa	25 Aug–9 Sep 2008	863	37	32	15	4	5	7	5
dimap	26 Jun–10 Jul 2008	1,001	31	31	20	5	6	7	Tie
Infratest dimap	5–7 May 2008	1,000	33	29	23	5	5	5	4
IfM Leipzig	8–10 Apr 2008	804	33	29	21	6	5	6	4
Emnid	13–27 Feb 2008	~500	36	25	24	4	5	?	11
IfM Leipzig	10–12 Dec 2007	803	35	25	25	5	4	6	10
Infratest dimap	Oct 2007	1,000	35	26	23	5	5	?	9
IfM Leipzig	21–22 Aug 2007	801	36	29	25	3	3	4	7
dimap	9–13 Jul 2007	1,003	40	25	24	4	4	3	15
IfM Leipzig	12–15 May 2007	801	34	25	26	5	5	5	8
Emnid	30 Apr–16 May 2007	516	32	27	22	6	6	6	5
IfM Leipzig	23 Feb 2007	?	30	26	28	6	5	5	2
IfM Leipzig	15 Dec 2006	802	34	25	27	5	4	5	7
IfM Leipzig	16–17 Aug 2006	810	33	26	30	4	3	4	3
IfM Leipzig	7–8 Feb 2006	802	34	24	29	3	4	6	10
IfM Leipzig	12–15 Dec 2005	806	36	26	27	3	5	3	9
Uni Jena	Jul 2005	~1,000	40	31	15	4	5	5	9
IfM Leipzig	28–30 May 2005	803	45	21	20	4	5	5	24
IfM Leipzig	24 Jan 2005	806	39	22	23	4	4	8	16
IfM Leipzig	Sep 2004	?	41	25	18	6	4	6	16
2004 state election	13 Jun 2004	–	43.0	26.1	14.5	4.5	3.6	8.3	16.9

== Election result ==
Summary of the 30 August 2009 election results for the Landtag of Thuringia
Party	Votes	%	+/–	Seats	+/–
Christian Democratic Union (CDU)	329,302	31.23	▼11.8	30	▼15
The Left (Linke)	288,915	27.40	▲1.3 ^{[A]}	28	▼1^{[A]}
Social Democratic Party (SPD)	195,363	18.53	▲4.0	18	▲3
Free Democratic Party (FDP)	80,600	7.64	▲4.0	7	▲7
Alliance 90/The Greens (Grüne)	64,912	6.16	▲1.7	6	▲6
National Democratic Party (NPD)	45,451	4.31	▲2.7	0	Steady
Free Voters (FW)	40,811	3.87	▲1.3	0	Steady
Others	8,943	0.85		0	Steady
Total	1,054,297	100.00	–	89	–

Popular Vote
CDU	31.23%
DIE LINKE	27.40%
SPD	18.53%
FDP	7.64%
B'90/GRÜNE	6.16%
NPD	4.31%
FW	3.87%
Other	0.86%

Landtag seats
CDU	34.09%
DIE LINKE	30.68%
SPD	20.45%
FDP	7.95%
B'90/GRÜNE	6.82%

== Outcome ==
Minister-President and CDU leader Dieter Althaus resigned in the wake of the election, stating he took responsibility for his party's losses. However, observers noted that his resignation also helped clear the way for a grand coalition between the CDU and SPD, which was preferred by both parties, and would be easier to manage under new leadership. The only viable alternative to a grand coalition was a government led by The Left with SPD and Green support, which both the CDU and SPD sought to avoid; the CDU because such a coalition would leave them in opposition, and the SPD because of personal animosity between its leader Christoph Matschie and Left leader Bodo Ramelow. Ultimately, a grand coalition of the CDU and SPD was formed under the leadership of the CDU's Christine Lieberknecht, who was elected Minister-President.

== Notes ==
A. Compared to results for PDS
