= Haselgrund =

Coordinates: 50.666944°N 10.553333°E

Haselgrund is a former Verwaltungsgemeinschaft ("collective municipality") in the district Schmalkalden-Meiningen, in Thuringia, Germany. The seat of the Verwaltungsgemeinschaft was in Viernau. It was disbanded in January 2019.

The Verwaltungsgemeinschaft Haselgrund consisted of the following municipalities:

1. Altersbach
2. Bermbach
3. Oberschönau
4. Rotterode
5. Unterschönau
6. Viernau
