= Großer Hermannsberg =

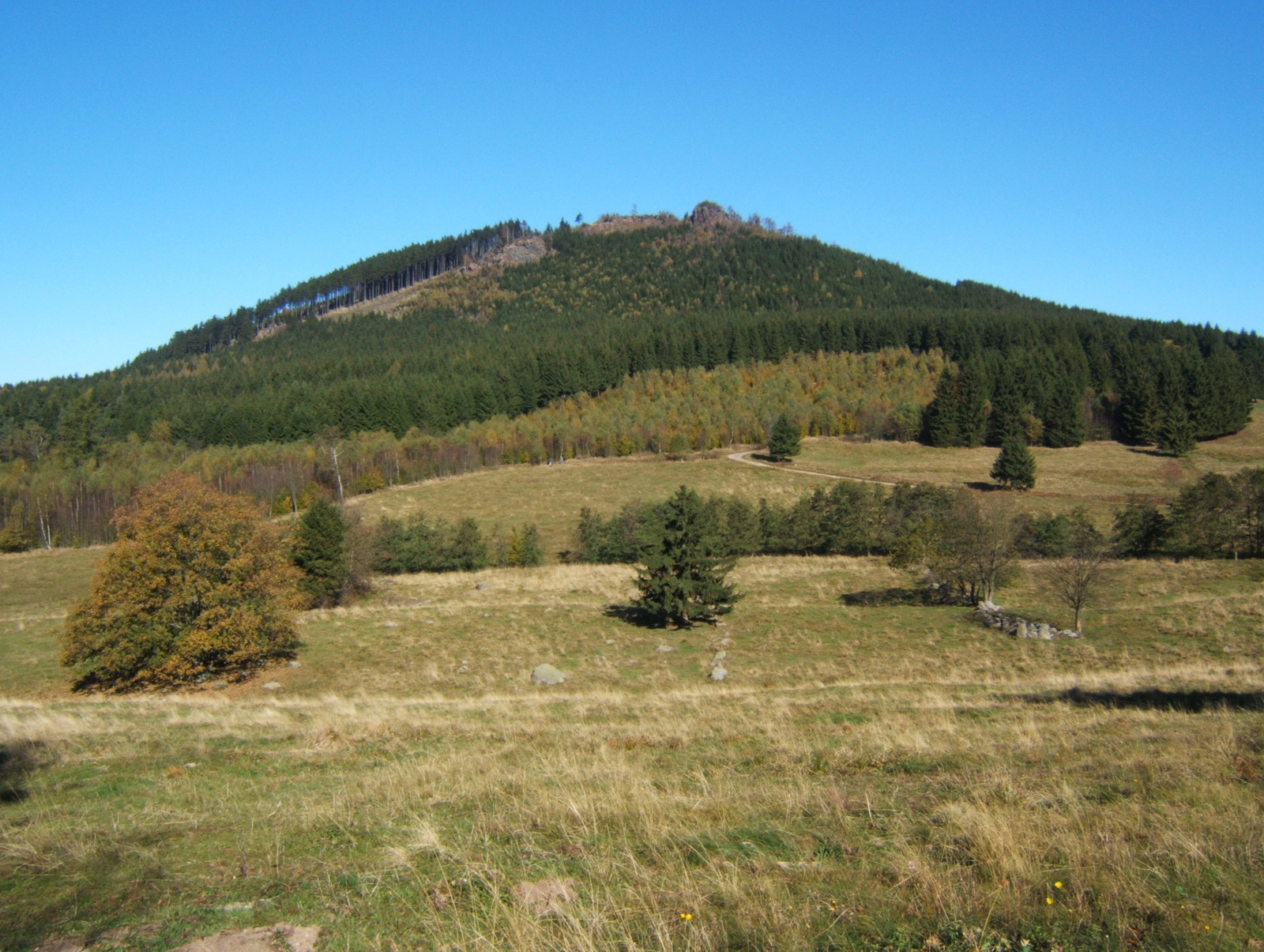
- Südseite

Highest point
- Elevation: 867 m (2,844 ft)
- Prominence: 140 m ↓ 700 m SE of the summit (near the source of the Dörmbach)
- Isolation: 2.5 km → Finsterbachkopf (898.3 m) – east of the Haselbach and the Kanzlersgrund
- Coordinates: 50°42′3″N 10°36′52″E

Geography
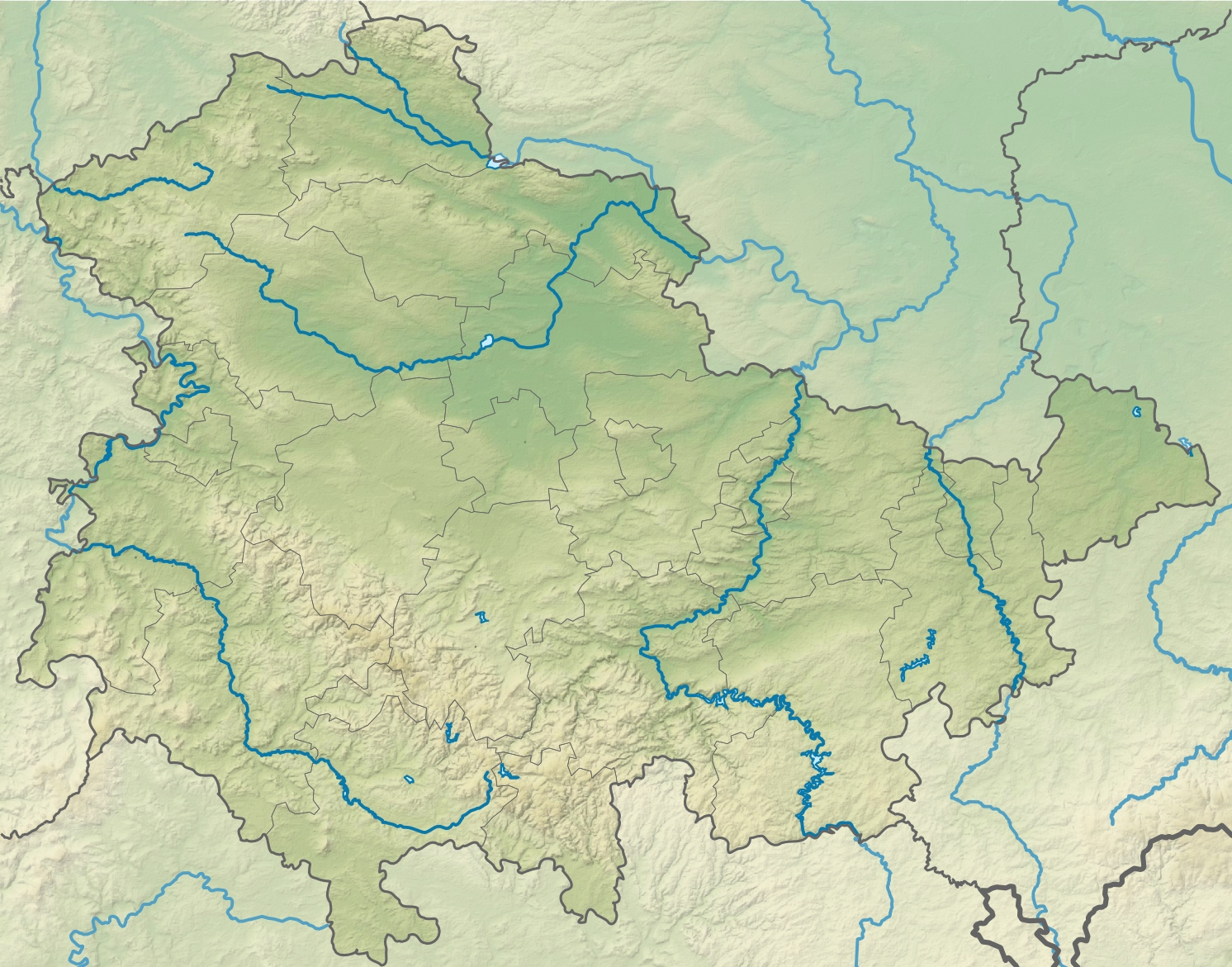
- Location within Thuringia
- Location: Thuringia, Germany
- Parent range: Thuringian Forest

The Großer Hermannsberg is a mountain, 867 metres high, south of the main ridge of the Thuringian Forest in the county of Schmalkalden-Meiningen in Germany.

== Location and area ==
To the north and immediately below the mountain is the village of Oberschönau and the adjacent Kanzlersgrund. Behind them is the main ridge of the Thuringian Forest with its long-distance trail, the Rennsteig. In front of the ridge are the mountains of Hohe Möst and Hoher Stein. To the southwest lies Bermbach, to the southeast is Zella-Mehlis and to the east is Oberhof.

== Routes to the summit ==
- From Oberschönau or the Kanzlersgrund via the Oberschönau Hiking Hut (Ski- und Wanderhütte Oberschönau), past the plateau of the Kleiner Hermannsberg. From the Fuhrmannswiese pasture south of the mountain a path runs steeply uphill to the northern viewing rocks with their refuge hut. From this hut a path runs south to the main summit and its viewing rocks. As a return route a path can be taken from the Fuhrmannswiese on the north side of the mountain which returns to the hiker's hut.
- From the hiker's car park at the Knüllfeld the route heads for Ruppberg, before crossing the Fuhrmannswiese diagonally and continuing as above.

== Summit description ==
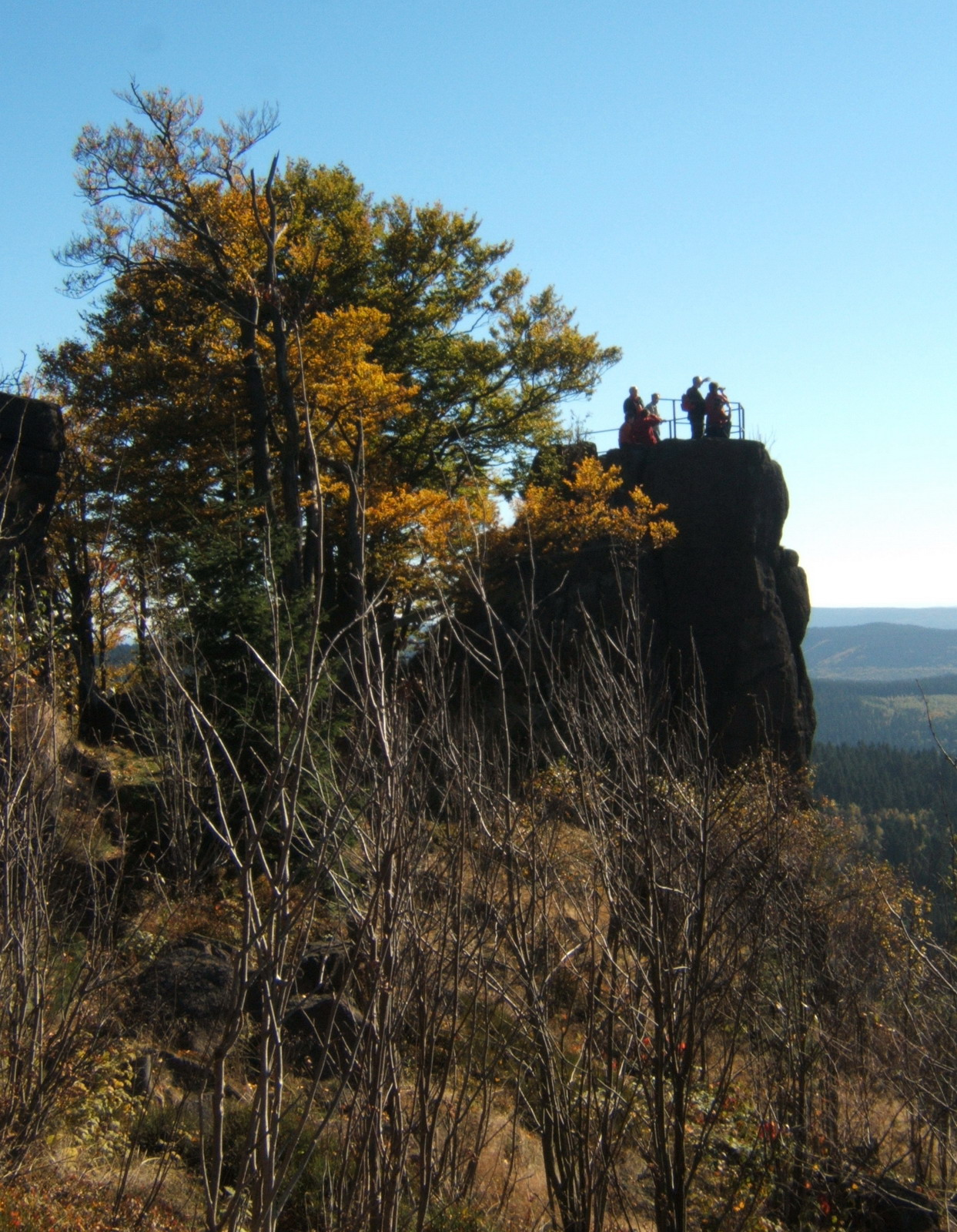
The main rocks

From the northern lookout rocks, the path runs along below the summit which, according to an inscription, is actually 873 metres high. From the path there is a further view of the Rhön mountains. Continuing towards the viewing rocks there is a view looking east by a small rock (see photograph below). The actual viewing rocks may be climbed using steps hewn out of the rock and a safety cable; the top is protected by railings. The top of these rocks is recorded on all the maps as being 867 metres high.

=== View ===
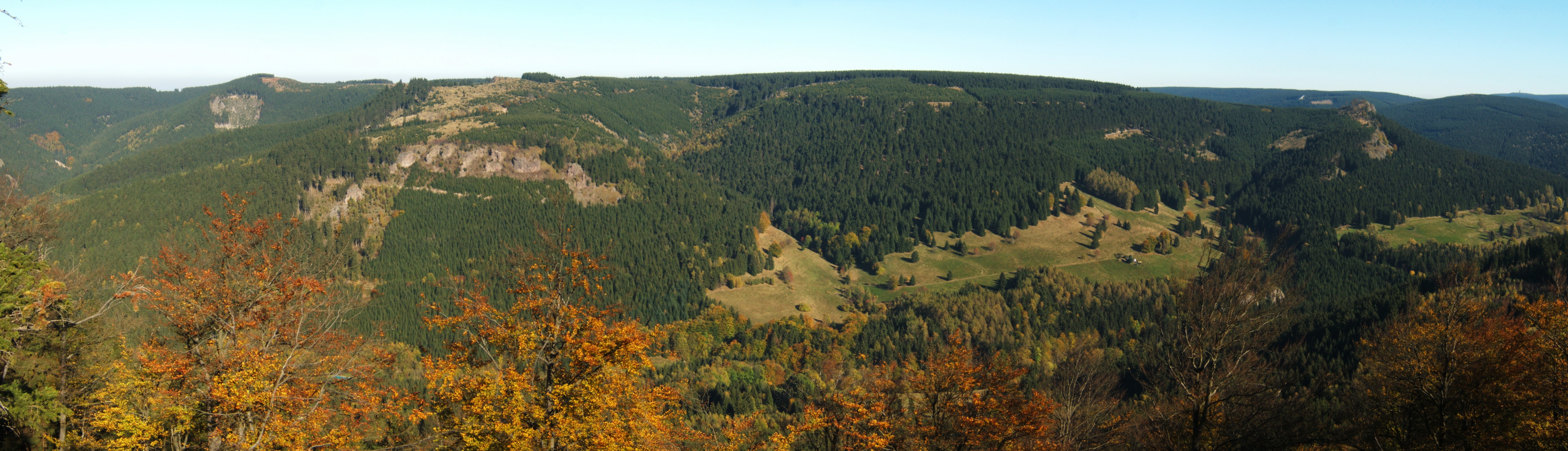
View of Donnershauk, Hohe Möst, Kanzlersgrund, Hoher Stein, Gebrannter Stein and Schneekopf (l to r.)

- North
  - Oberschönau (from the northern viewing rocks)
- East
  - Donnershauk, Hohe Möst
  - Kanzlersgrund
  - Schanzenanlage Kanzlersgrund, Hoher Stein
  - Gebrannter Stein
  - Schneekopf
- Southeast
  - Ringberghaus and Adlersberg Tower near Suhl
- From south to northwest
  - Gleichberge
  - Dolmar
  - Kreuzberg (Rhön)
  - Hutsberg and Neuberg
  - Hohe Geba
  - Heidelstein and Wasserkuppe
  - Diesburg and Leichelberg
  - Milseburg
  - Steinbach-Hallenberg
  - Baier, Dietrichsberg, Öchsenberg, Kaliberge
  - Altersbach and Rotterode
