= Thuringia ski jump =

Ski jumping hill in Oberhof, Germany

Thüringenschanze
- Hindenburgschanze
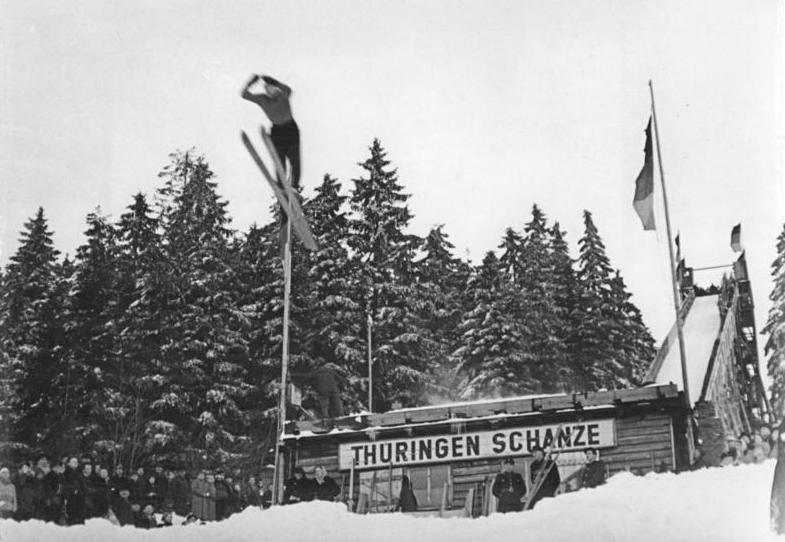
- Inrun tower with jumper at the 4th Winter Sports Championships of the GDR 1953
- Location: Oberhof; East Germany
- Coordinates: 50°42′36.7″N 10°43′11.7″E
- Opened: 1925–1927; 99 years ago
- Renovated: 1948/1949; 77 years ago
- Expanded: 1937/1938; 88 years ago, 1951/1952; 74 years ago
- Closed: 1986; 40 years ago
- Demolished: 1986; 40 years ago

Size
- K–point: 82 m (269 ft)
- Hill record: 83.5 m (274 ft); Jens Weißflog (1981)

Top events
- World Championships: FIS Nordic World Ski Championships 1931

Thüringenschanze or Thuringia ski jump, known as Hindenburg ski jump until 1945, was a ski jumping hill in Oberhof in the Thuringian Forest. The large hill, which was built between 1925 and 1927, was one of the largest ski jumps in Germany for over 50 years in terms of jump distances. It was located on the western slope of the Wadeberg next to the youth ski jump on the outskirts of Oberhof. It hosted the ski jumping competitions of the Nordic World Ski Championships in 1931 and numerous other ski jumping competitions with international participants. The construction point (K-point), the size for which a ski jump is designed, was last at 82 meters after several conversions and extensions and the hill record, set by Jens Weißflog in 1981, was 83.5 meters. It was demolished in 1986.

== Location ==
The ski jump was located on the north-western outskirts of Oberhof on Crawinkler Straße, the state road 1128 from Oberhof to Ohrdruf. It occupied the south-western slope of the 827.3 meters high Schloßbergkopf on the Wadeberg and was located around 750 meters above sea level. The inrun of the Wadeberg bobsleigh run was located right next to the ski jump.

== Description ==
For spectators, there were ground stands in the outrun area and wooden stands on both sides of the upper landing slope. The standard point of the ski jump (P-point) was 66.5 meters after the last conversions. The landing area started at 47 meters with a slope inclination of 38° and changed into the outrun after another 36 meters. The achievable jumping distances were 80 meters with average take-off speeds of 80 to 90 kilometers per hour. The ski jump had a 24 meter high inrun tower in wooden construction, which accommodated the 97 meter long inrun track. In contrast to the artificial inrun area, the landing area was located entirely on the natural slope. The total height of the ski jump was 99, the total length 325 and the height of the take-off 4.3 meters. The landing area was covered with plastic mattings, so that jumping without snow was possible. The mats were moistened before jumping and therefore had similar gliding properties to snow. The multi-storey wooden judges' tower had four balconies, with the top one reserved for the judges. The ski jump was "property of the people"; the legal owner was the council of the Oberhof municipality.

== History ==
The first ski jump in Oberhof was set up in 1906 and was located on Tambacher Straße. At Wadeberg, the first ski jump was set up in 1908 with today's junior hill (HS 69). This was completely rebuilt in 1951/52 and covered with plastic mattings in 1954. It was the site of the world's first plastic covered ski jump. At the beginning of the 1920s, the junior hill allowed top jumps of almost 30 meters.

=== Hindenburg ski jump(1925 bis 1945) ===
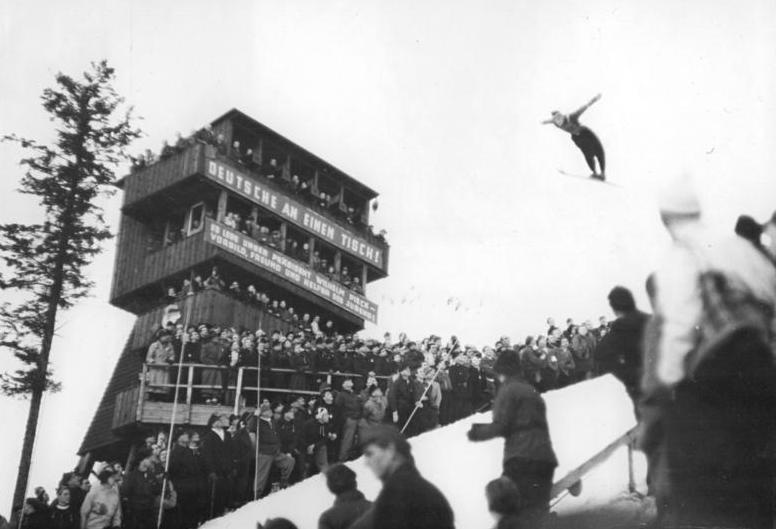
Referee tower and jumper in 1951

==== The first years ====
In order to be able to host larger ski jumping competitions in Oberhof, plans were made for a larger ski jump. For this purpose, the Oberhof winter sports association leased a forest area of around 0.5 hectares from the Thuringian forestry office in Crawinkel from October 1, 1924. Construction of the ski jump began in 1925. It was inaugurated on December 22, 1927, as Hindenburgschanze. The ski jump was named after Reich President Paul von Hindenburg. The landing area of the ski jump was between 25 and 60 meters, the steepest part of the landing slope between 50 and 58 meters. The inrun length was 97 meters and the outrun 118 meters. The total height of the ski jump was 81 meters. The ski jump had a new type of jump distance display at the 50-meter mark. This display, which had been tested at the Holmenkollen Ski Games, had been obtained from Norway and was the first in Central Europe. The inauguration was to take place during a ski jumping competition for the honorary prize of His Excellency von Hindenburg. However, a thaw that had set in days beforehand meant that jumping was not possible. The international opening competition finally took place on February 5, 1928, with the Thuringian Championships in front of around 30,000 spectators. The Norwegian Sverre Jensen won with the first hill record of 45 meters. Gustav Scherschmidt from Oberschönau came second with a distance of 39 meters.

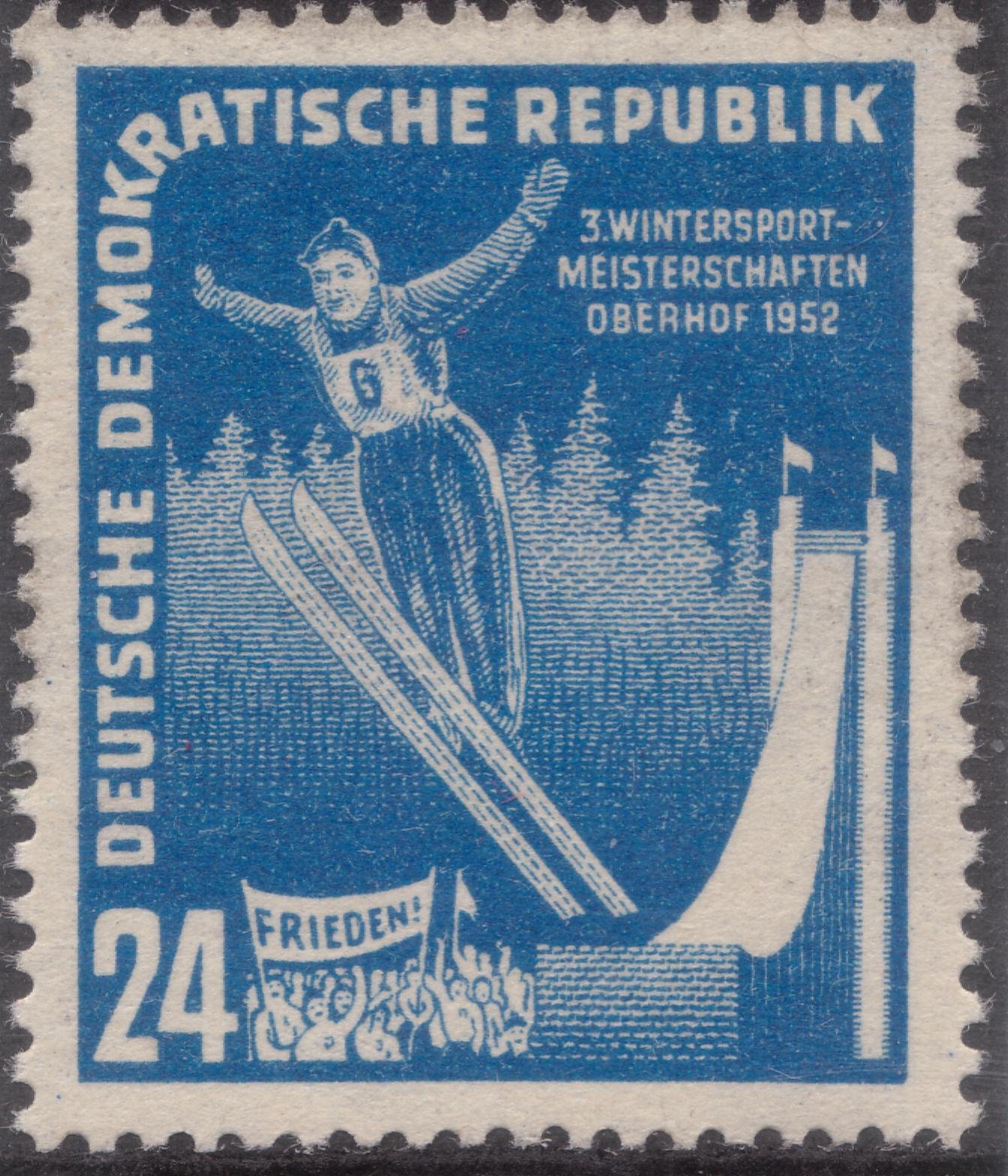
24 pf stamp of the GDR Post Office for the Winter Sports Championships of the GDR in Oberhof 1952

==== Venue of the 1931 World Championship ====
Oberhof was chosen by the FIS Congress in Oslo in 1930 to host the FIS races (later the Nordic World Ski Championships). During the competitions, the town was decorated with snow figures, welcoming arches at the street entrances and house decorations. From February 13 to 15, 1931, the jumping competitions of the FIS races took place on the Hindenburgschanze. The special competition on February 15 was watched by around 30,000 spectators, who arrived by 2000 cars, 26 special trains, ten shuttle buses, horse-drawn sleighs, skis or on foot. The Mitteldeutsche Zeitung wrote about it on February 17, 1931: "Oberhof had the biggest day in its resort history on Sunday. Oberhof's name resounds throughout the world today." The Norwegian Birger Ruud won the special jumping competition with distances of 58.5 and 56.5 meters ahead of Fritz Kaufmann from Switzerland and Sven Eriksson from Sweden. In the Nordic combined, Norway's Johan Grøttumsbråten had won the previous day ahead of Sverre Kolterud and Arne Rustadstuen.

==== Competitions during the National Socialist era ====
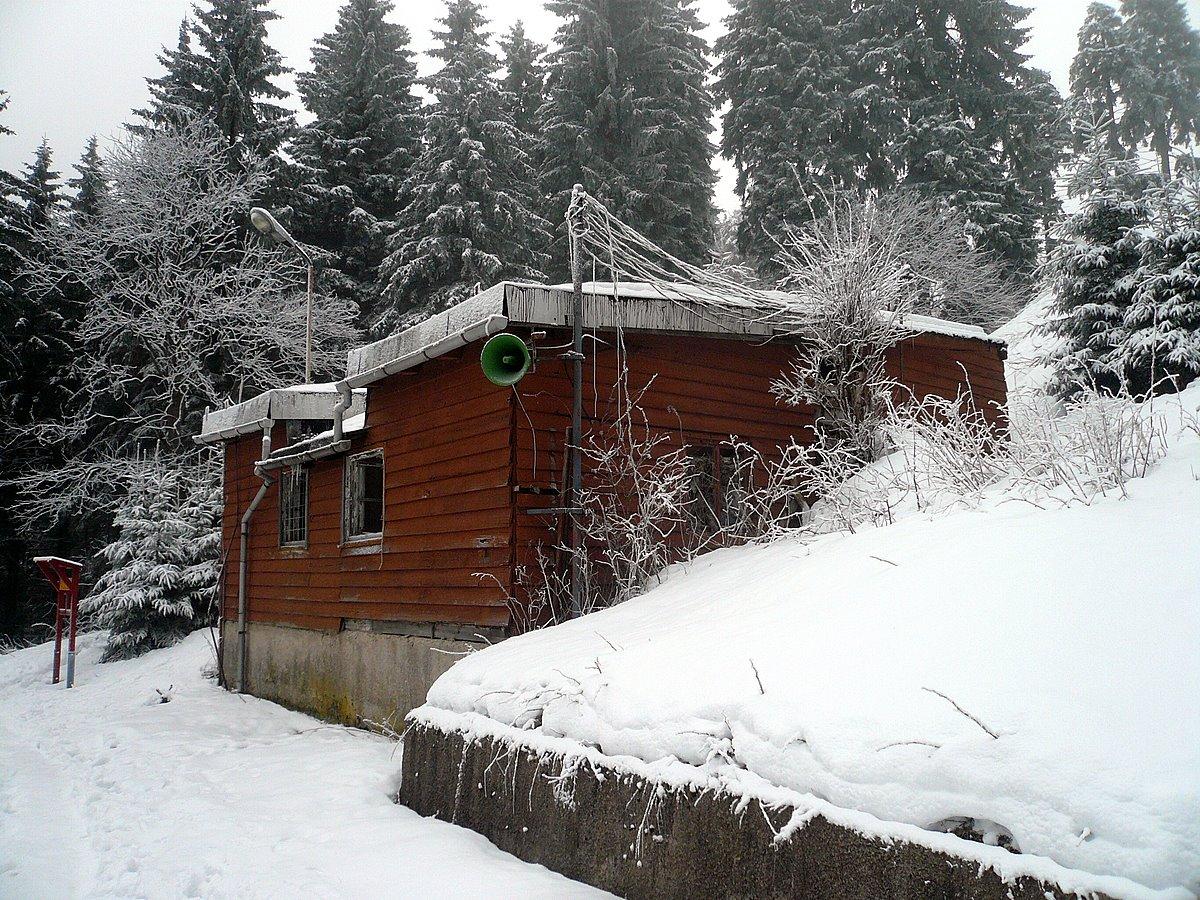
Ski jump table in 2008

In 1932, the ski jumping competitions were held on the hill at the Thuringian Ski Championships. At the New Year's competition in 1934, Paul Henkel from Oberhof reached an unprecedented distance of 65 meters, but fell. The longest jump achieved was 55 meters by Oskar Weisheit from Oberschönau. The Thuringian Winter Sports Association was renamed Ski-Gau VI in 1933, and later winter sports were also militarized. In 1937 and 1938, the ski jump was converted for the Nazi Winter Olympics by moving it back and raising it, and the inrun was made higher. The cost of the conversion work amounted to around 31,000 Reichsmark. The ski jump then allowed jumps of around 70 meters. At the same time, the stands were considerably extended and could now accommodate around 70,000 spectators. From February 18 to 20, 1938, the Winter Games were held on the Hindenburgschanze with a special competition. From February 3 to 5, 1939, the Wehrmacht ski championships were held on the ski jump.

In 1939, the German Ski Championships were held in Oberhof, where Josef Bradl from Salzburg won the ski jumping competition and Gustav Berauer the Nordic combined and became Greater German Champion. On New Year's Day 1940, the last competition of the Second World War took place on the ski jump, in which the top German jumpers took part, with the winner being Rudi Gering (from Gehlberg) ahead of Hans Marr from Oberhof. In 1941, the ski jumping competitions of the Thuringian Ski Championships were held on the ski jump, with Private Heinz Holland from Schmiedefeld am Rennsteig winning. After that, no more sporting events were held in Oberhof; more and more war wounded were sent to the local military hospitals until 1945. However, ski jumping competitions were still held at the end of December 1941, in which members of the national team took part: Josef Bradl was the winner with jumps of 65 and 68 m; together with Josef Haslinger and Franz Mair, he also won the team title.

=== Thuringia ski jump (1945 bis 1986) ===
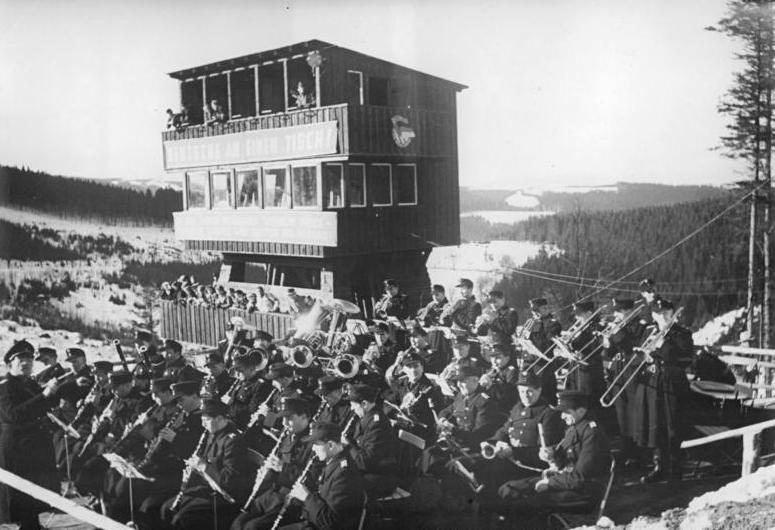
Orchestra of the Berlin People's Police in 1951

==== Reopening in post-war Germany ====
After the end of the Second World War, the ski jump was renamed Thüringenschanze. After several years of inactivity, the ski jump had become dilapidated. Residents of Oberhof had used the planks of the inrun tower as firewood. The Thüringenschanze was renovated from fall 1948 onwards, which amounted to around 5090 working hours and costs of around 15,000 DM. A fortunate circumstance was that the substructure of the ski jump had not become rotten despite years of lack of maintenance. On the other hand, the reconstruction of the hill profile, which had been washed out from 32 degrees to 25 degrees, took up a large part of the work, during which a total of 100 cubic meters of earth were moved. The main problem for the 50 workers and ten activists proved to be the transportation of the earth, as only horse-drawn vehicles were available.

From February 11 to 15, 1949, the 1st Championships of the Soviet Occupation Zone (East Zone Championships) in winter sports took place with 450 participants, which had been prepared with great effort. After the 1931 World Championships, this was the largest sporting event in Oberhof. Wilhelm Pieck, Walter Ulbricht, Otto Grotewohl and Erich Honecker, the leading politicians of the Soviet occupation zone, as well as representatives of the Soviet Military Administration in Germany (SMAD) were present. Franz Knappe from Geschwenda won the ski jumping competition on the renovated Thüringenschanze in front of around 15,000 spectators. The winner in the Nordic combined was Herbert Leonhardt from Mühlleithen.

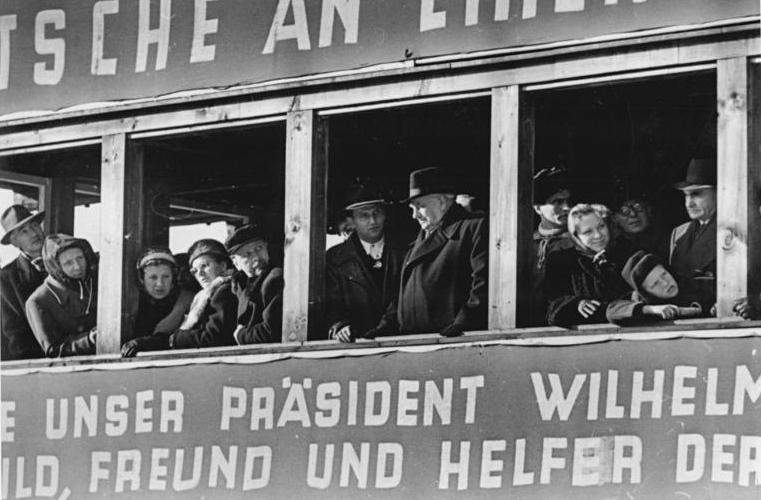
Walter Ulbricht and Wilhelm Pieck in the VIP gallery in 1951

==== Venue of the GDR championships ====
In 1950 and 1951, the ski jump was completely renovated and a multi-storey judges' tower was built. The hill profile was changed several times, so that later distances of around 80 meters were possible. From 1951 to 1956, the GDR ski championships in the Nordic skiing disciplines were held there every February. As spectator interest waned at the last championships, the venues were changed after 1956. The ski championships from February 11 to 18, 1951, which were opened by the President of the GDR, Wilhelm Pieck, attracted up to 120,000 spectators on one weekend, who arrived on 48 special trains, numerous buses and other means of transport. The municipality of Oberhof was partially overwhelmed by the enormous crowds of spectators, all hotels and hostels were fully booked and there were long delays on departure. As a result, the leadership of the Socialist Unity Party of Germany (SED) in Berlin decided that no more than 60,000 spectators should be allowed at sporting events in future. Athletes from France, Poland, Hungary and West Germany took part in the ski championships in 1954, which is why these championships had a higher status. The President of the People's Chamber of the GDR, Johannes Dieckmann, was also present.

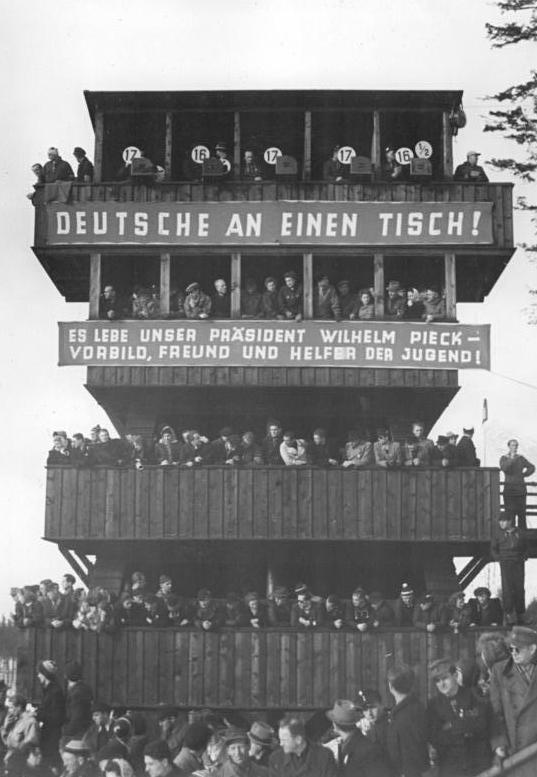
Referee tower with slogans in 1951

==== Further competitions ====
Until the 1970s, the Christmas ski jumping competition with international participants was held on the ski jump. In 1955, the ski jump was covered with plastic mattings. From the mid-1950s, the International Oberhof Winter Sports Weeks were held with ski jumping competitions on the Thüringenschanze. On December 28, 1955, the first Olympic competition between BDR and GDR ski jumpers for the first joint Olympic team of the 1956 Winter Olympics in Cortina d'Ampezzo took place on Thüringenschanze, in which 37 jumpers took part. In January 1960, qualifying competitions for the 1960 Winter Olympics in Squaw Valley were once again held on the ski jump. The later Olympic champion Helmut Recknagel from Steinbach-Hallenberg won the ski jumping competition.

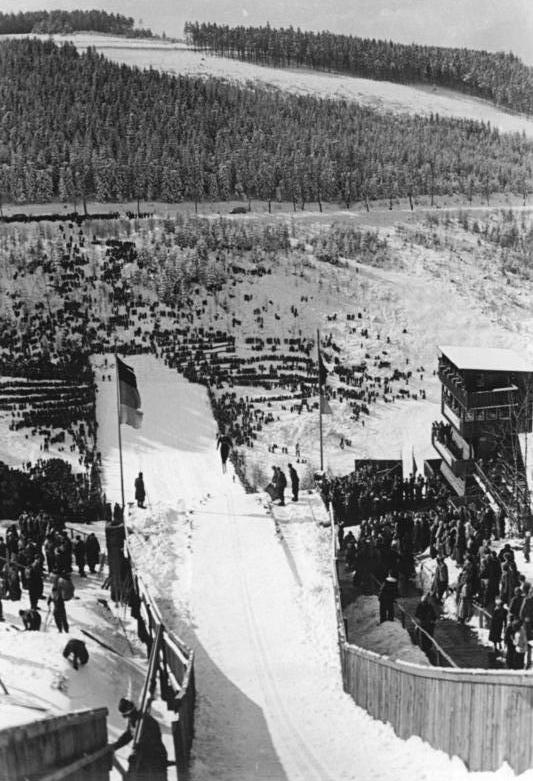
View from the ski jump tower in 1954

After the inauguration of the Hans-Renner-Schanze in the early 1960s, which enabled jumps over 110 meters, things became quieter around the Thüringenschanze. Major ski jumping competitions rarely took place after that. From then on, it was mainly used as a training hill. In 1964, the hill record was 78.5 meters. From February 21 to 25, 1968, the 2nd Central Children's and Youth Winter Sports Games were held in Oberhof and Goldlauter, with the ski jumping competitions being held on the Thuringia ski jump. There was almost an accident during the jumping competition. The 17-year-old future Olympic champion Hans-Georg Aschenbach from Brotterode lost both skis immediately after taking off from the take-off. He flew through the air and landed at a distance of 42.5 meters, slid down the landing slope on the soles of his boots and fell.

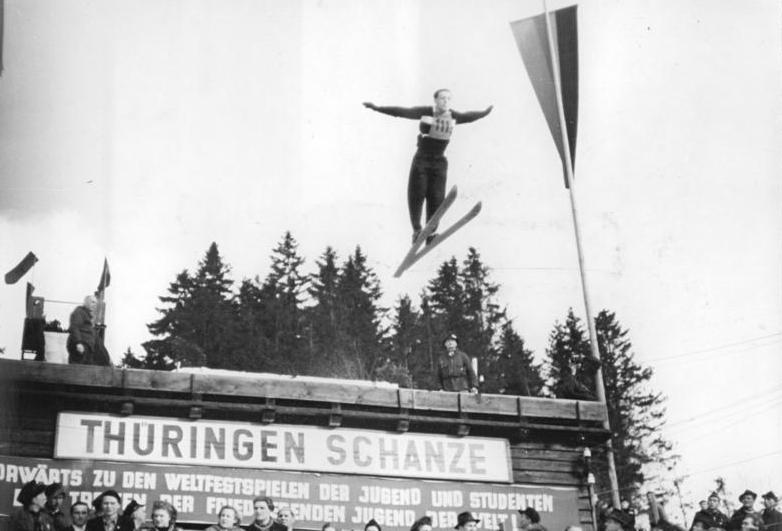
Springer in 1951

==== Use as a training hill and later demolition ====
From July 19 to 21, 1977, defects were discovered on the Thüringenschanze during an inspection of the most important ski jumps in the GDR. At the 15th Oberhof Ski Games in February 1981, 16-year-old Jens Weißflog from Oberwiesenthal jumped the last hill record of 83.5 meters. After the completion of the normal hill (K 90) at Kanzlersgrund in the mid-1980s, ski jumping training on the Thüringenschanze was also discontinued. The 24-metre-high wooden inrun tower was demolished in 1986 after no one saw themselves in a position to maintain the elaborate structure, which was no longer needed for jumping. At that time, the Thüringenschanze had a hill certificate (hill profile confirmation) valid until 1991 according to the International Ski Competition Regulations (§ 414) of the Fédération Internationale de Ski (FIS), which allowed competitions with international participation. The ski jump was listed by the FIS with the certificate number 53/DDR 2 with a standard point of 67 and a K-point of 82 meters. At present, only the overgrown landing hill and counter slope as well as the take-off are still recognizable.

== Technical data ==
Thüringenschanze (1964)
Approach
Tower height	42 m
Run-in length	97 m
Tower height	30°
Tower height	85 km/h
Ski jump table
Height	4.3 m
Angle	6.5°
Bounce
K-point	82 m
Length difference table edge to K-point (n)	56.4 m
Ratio of height to length difference (h/n)	0.55 m
K-point inclination angle (β)	38°
Outlet
Length	118 m
Outlet
Total height of the system	99 m
Total length of the system	325 m
Hill record	83.5 m

Hindenburgschanze (1964)
Approach
Tower height	29 m
Run-in length	97 m
Tower height	26%
Tower height	-
Ski jump table
Height	-
Angle	2-3%
Bounce
K-point	-
Length difference table edge to K-point (n)	-
Ratio of height to length difference (h/n)	-
K-point inclination angle (β)	37-38%
Outlet
Length	118 m
Outlet
Total height of the system	81.36 m
Total length of the system	-
Hill record	-

== More ski jumps ==
In the immediate vicinity of Thüringenschanze, other ski jumps together form the ski jumping facility at Wadeberg. To the left of the landing slope of the Thüringenschanze is the Jugendschanze (HS 69), to the right is the Pionierschanze, which was built in 1952 for jumps of up to around 25 meters. The children's ski jump with a K-Point of 13 meters was later built on its landing slope. On the opposite slope, diagonally opposite the Thüringenschanze, there are two junior hills (also known as Spartakiadeeschanzen), which were built in 1976 (HS 50) and 1982 (HS 36). All four ski jumps are covered with plastic mattings and serve as training hills for young skiers. In Kanzlersgrund, three kilometers away, there is a double ski jumping facility covered with plastic mattings (HS 140 and HS 96).

== Literature ==
- Wolfgang Fritzsche (2005), Oberhof: Geschichte – Landschaft – Tipps – Wanderungen (2. ed.), Ilmenau: Verlag Grünes Herz, ISBN 3-935621-29-9
- Gerd Falkner (2000), Deutscher Skiverband (ed.), Chronik des Skisports in der Deutschen Demokratischen Republik, Eigenverlag
- Roland Sänger (1995), Thüringer Wintersport-Verband und Suhler Verlagsgesellschaft mbH (ed.), Chronik des Thüringer Skisports, Suhl: Suhl-Druck GmbH
- Rolf Hackel (1993), "Oberhof: Vom Hospiz der Johanniter zur Stadt am Rennsteig; Geschichte und Landschaft Oberhof – ein Zentrum des Wintersports, Wandern im Herzen des Thüringer Waldes", Städte und Gemeinden in Thüringen, Ilmenau: Heinrich-Jung-Verlagsgesellschaft mbH (i. G.), ISBN 3-929164-12-4
- Jan Knapp; et al., Wintersportverein Oberhof 05 (ed.), 100 Jahre Wintersport in Oberhof, Bauer und Malsch

== See also ==
- Thüringenschanze at Skisprungschanzen.com
- Ski jumps on the Wadeberg near the Thuringian Winter Sports Center Oberhof
