= Citizens for Thuringia =

Citizens for Thuringia Bürger für Thüringen
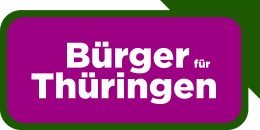
- Abbreviation: BfTh
- Leader: Steffen Teichmann
- Founded: 27 November 2020
- Dissolved: 25 March 2024
- Merged into: Values Union
- Headquarters: Ilmenau
- Colours: Purple

Website
- https://www.buerger-fuer-thueringen.de/

The Citizens for Thuringia (German: Bürger für Thüringen; abbreviation: Btfh) was a political party in Thuringia in Germany between 2020 and 2024. After party defections, it was represented in the Landtag of Thuringia with four seats. The party dissolved in 2024 to join the Values Union. The association of the same name, however, remained in existence.

== History ==
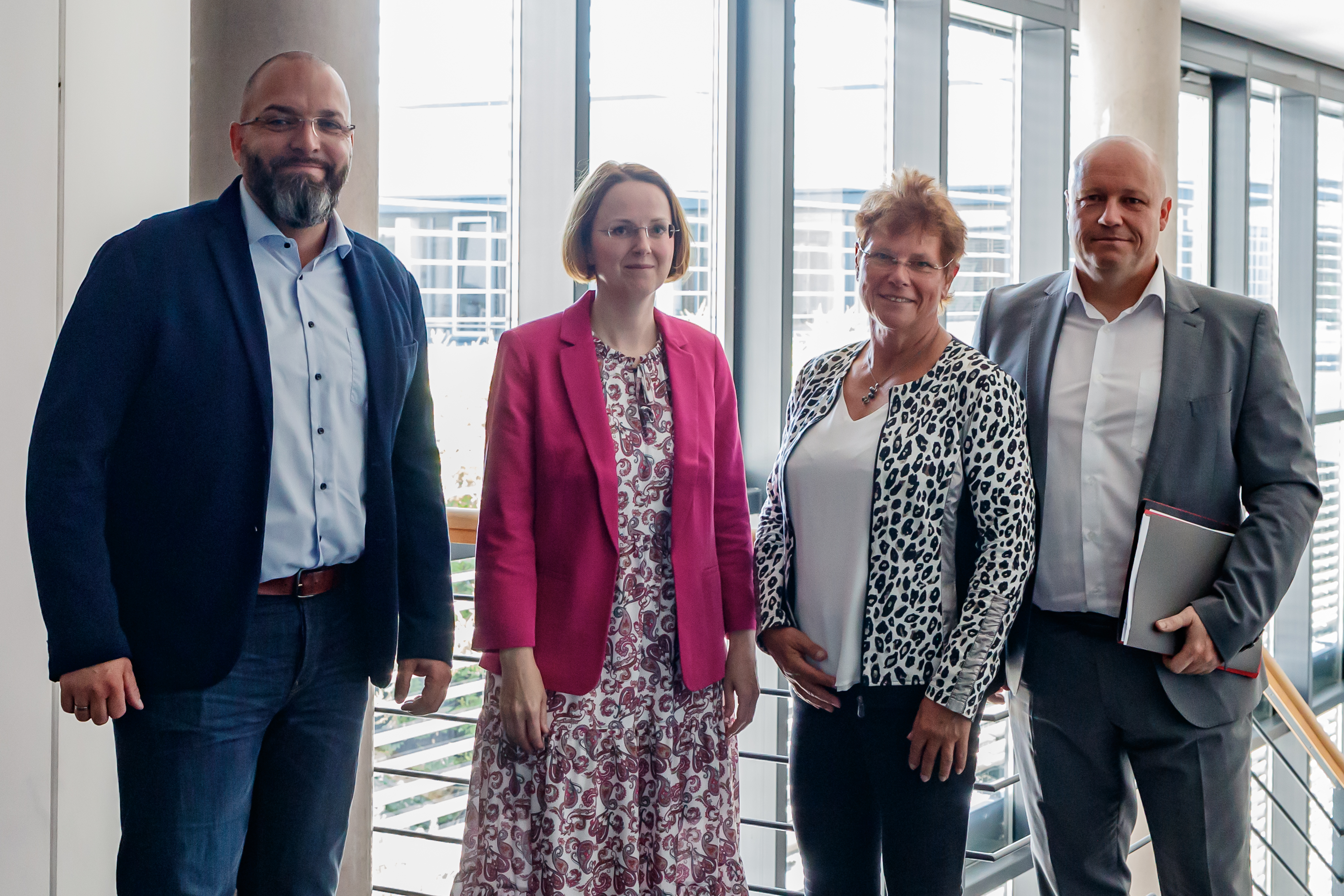
Birger Gröning, Tosca Kniese, Ute Bergner and Lars Schütze (from left to right) at the press conference on the founding of the parliamentary group in 2022

The Citizens for Thuringia party emerged from the association of the same name, which was founded in March 2020 in connection with the government crisis in Thuringia and campaigned against the resignation of Minister-President of Thuringia Thomas Kemmerich (FDP), who had been elected with votes from the AfD, CDU and FDP. The party was finally founded on 27 November 2020 in the Ringberg Hotel in Suhl with nine members. There were almost no personnel differences between the association and the party.

On 1 September 2021, Ute Bergner, previously a member of the FDP parliamentary group, became a party member and initially represented the party as an individual in the Landtag of Thuringia. In 2022, three former members of the AfD parliamentary group joined the party: Birger Gröning and Tosca Kniese had previously left the AfD because they rejected "hate and incitement" or "disguised racism". They were joined by Lars Schütze who had been expelled from the AfD. In July 2022, the four MPs were recognized as a parliamentary group in the Thuringian state parliament; the formation of a parliamentary group is only possible with five or more MPs. Bergner took over the chairmanship of the group. The group disbanded in December, however, after the party announced that it would expel Gröning and Schütze for "behaviour damaging to the party" and Gröning and Schütze themselves resigned from the party and the state parliament group.

In March 2023, it became known that the dissolved parliamentary group had been reported for alleged embezzlement. The parliamentarians were accused of using state funds of 80,000 euros to procure office supplies from a friendly company without carrying out the required public tender. Party representatives rejected the allegations and, after inspecting the files at the public prosecutor's office, stated that none of the accused were being investigated.

For the 2024 Thuringian state election, Citizens for Thuringia planned to run with a joint list with the association Free Voters Thuringia e. V. (not related to the party Free Voters in Thuringia) and the Thuringian state association of the Grassroots Democratic Party of Germany. On 25 March 2024, it was announced that the Citizens for Thuringia party would dissolve and its members would join the Values Union in order to run together in the state election as part of the Alliance for Thuringia. The Citizens for Thuringia association, however, remained in existence.

== Political-ideological classification ==
Citizens for Thuringia described itself as "ecologically liberal".

The Frankfurter Rundschau classified the party as right-wing.

In 2022, the Thuringian Die Linke accused the party of having collaborated with radical representatives of the Querdenken movement and right-wing extremist individuals. In 2021, texts were found on the party's website in which extremism researchers saw "essential features of conspiracy narratives " aimed at discrediting democratic structures. In addition, the "lateral thinker lawyer" Ralf Ludwig spoke at a Citizens for Thuringia rally. The Office for the Protection of the Constitution for Thuringia stated that it was monitoring "(right-wing) extremist individuals in the environment of this party who had influenced the COVID-19 protests in Germany in recent months" for intelligence purposes, but that the party itself was "currently not an object of observation.
