= Gotha I =

Electoral constituency for the regional parliament of Thuringia, Germany

Gotha I is an electoral constituency (German: Wahlkreis) represented in the Landtag of Thuringia. It elects one member via first-past-the-post voting. Under the current constituency numbering system, it is designated as constituency 14. It covers the southern part of the district of Gotha.

Gotha I was created in 1990 for the first state election. Since 2024, it has been represented by Marcel Kramer of Alternative for Germany (AfD).

== Geography ==
As of the 2019 state election, Gotha I covers the southern part of the district of Gotha, specifically the municipalities of Bad Tabarz/Thür. Wald, Emleben, Friedrichroda, Georgenthal/Thür. Wald, Herrenhof, Hohenkirchen, Leinatal, Luisenthal, Ohrdruf, Petriroda, Tambach-Dietharz/Thür. Wald, and Waltershausen.

== Members ==
The constituency was held by the Christian Democratic Union from its creation in 1990 until 2019, during which time it was represented by Johanna Köhler (1990–1994), Franz Schuster (1994–2004), and Jürgen Reinholz (2004–2019). It was won by Alternative for Germany in 2019, and is represented by Birger Gröning.

Election	Member	Party	%
1990	Johanna Köhler	CDU	41.4
1994	Franz Schuster	CDU	47.1
1999	Franz Schuster	CDU	48.4
2004	Jürgen Reinholz	CDU	49.8
2009	Jürgen Reinholz	CDU	34.5
2014	Jürgen Reinholz	CDU	38.0
2019	Birger Gröning	AfD	24.5
2024	Marcel Kramer	AfD	37.3

== Election results ==
=== 2024 election ===
State election (2024): Eichsfeld I
Notes:	Blue background denotes the winner of the electorate vote. Pink background denotes a candidate elected from their party list. Yellow background denotes an electorate win by a list member, or other incumbent. A ✓ or ✗ denotes status of any incumbent, win or lose respectively.						
Party	Candidate	Votes	%	±%	Party votes	%	±%
AfD	Marcel Kramer	9,876	37.3	▲12.8	9,529	35.7	▲11.5
CDU	Michael Brychcy	9,774	36.9	▲12.8	6,059	22.7	▲2.2
BSW					4,190	15.7	
SPD	George Maier	3,222	12.2	▼9.0	2,084	7.8	▼3.4
Left	Sascha Bilay	2,365	8.9	▼11.8	3,131	11.7	▼19.4
FW	Maik Deckert	779	2.9		280	1.1	
Greens					365	1.4	▼2.2
APT					301	1.1	▼0.1
FDP	Christian Doebel	477	1.8	▼2.5	257	1.0	▼3.3
Familie					133	0.5	
BD					118	0.4	
Values					116	0.4	
Pirates					53	0.2	▼0.1
ÖDP					29	0.1	▼0.2
MLPD					21	0.1	▼0.2
Informal votes		452			279		
Total valid votes		26,493			26,666		
Turnout		26,945	73.0	▲9.5			
AfD hold	Majority	102	0.4	Steady			

=== 2019 election ===
State election (2019): Gotha I
Notes:	Blue background denotes the winner of the electorate vote. Pink background denotes a candidate elected from their party list. Yellow background denotes an electorate win by a list member, or other incumbent. A ✓ or ✗ denotes status of any incumbent, win or lose respectively.						
Party	Candidate	Votes	%	±%	Party votes	%	±%
AfD	Birger Gröning	5,973	24.5		5,906	24.2	▲12.0
CDU	Hans-Georg Creutzburg	5,863	24.1	▼13.9	5,012	20.5	▼13.2
SPD	Georg Maier	5,165	21.2	▼4.4	2,727	11.2	▼2.8
Left	Kristin Linde	5,044	20.7	▼5.6	7,583	31.1	▲5.6
Greens	Steffen Fuchs	1,167	4.8		873	3.6	▼0.9
FDP	Christian Döbel	1,046	4.3	▲0.4	1,049	4.3	▲1.8
MLPD	René Hessenmüler	101	0.4		65	0.3	
List-only parties					1,196	4.9	
Informal votes		395			343		
Total valid votes		24,359			24,411		
Turnout		24,754	63.5	▲10.7			
AfD gain from CDU	Majority	110	0.4				

=== 2014 election ===
State election (2014): Gotha I
Notes:	Blue background denotes the winner of the electorate vote. Pink background denotes a candidate elected from their party list. Yellow background denotes an electorate win by a list member, or other incumbent. A ✓ or ✗ denotes status of any incumbent, win or lose respectively.						
Party	Candidate	Votes	%	±%	Party votes	%	±%
CDU	✓ Jürgen Reinholz	8,004	38.0	▲3.5	7,169	33.7	▲0.3
Left	Monika Döllstedt	5,561	26.4	▲5.0	5,432	25.5	▲1.9
SPD	Werner Pidde	5,396	25.6	▼2.0	2,988	14.0	▼7.9
AfD					2,589	12.2	
Greens					964	4.5	▼0.5
NPD	Karsten Höhn	1,289	6.1	▲0.5	928	4.4	▼0.6
FDP	Christian Döbel	821	3.9	▼2.4	526	2.5	▼4.7
List-only parties					706	3.3	
Informal votes		564			333		
Total valid votes		21,071			21,302		
Turnout		21,635	52.8	▼4.2			
CDU hold	Majority	2,443	11.6	▼4.7			

=== 2009 election ===
State election (2009): Gotha I
Notes:	Blue background denotes the winner of the electorate vote. Pink background denotes a candidate elected from their party list. Yellow background denotes an electorate win by a list member, or other incumbent. A ✓ or ✗ denotes status of any incumbent, win or lose respectively.						
Party	Candidate	Votes	%	±%	Party votes	%	±%
CDU	✓ Jürgen Reinholz	8,331	34.5	▼15.3	8,091	33.4	▼13.6
SPD	Werner Pidde	6,664	27.6	▲4.5	5,317	21.9	▲7.6
Left	Monika Döllstedt	5,181	21.4	▼5.7	5,721	23.6	▼0.3
FDP	Jens Panse	1,520	6.3		1,741	7.2	▲3.6
NPD	Mario Lehner	1,350	5.6		1,214	5.0	▲3.8
Greens	Albrecht Loth	1,125	4.7		1,214	5.0	▲1.7
List-only parties					933	3.9	
Informal votes		580			520		
Total valid votes		24,171			24,231		
Turnout		24,751	57.0	▲1.0			
CDU hold	Majority	1,667	6.9	▼15.8			

=== 2004 election ===
State election (2004): Gotha I
Notes:	Blue background denotes the winner of the electorate vote. Pink background denotes a candidate elected from their party list. Yellow background denotes an electorate win by a list member, or other incumbent. A ✓ or ✗ denotes status of any incumbent, win or lose respectively.						
Party	Candidate	Votes	%	±%	Party votes	%	±%
CDU	Jürgen Reinholz	11,645	49.8	▲1.4	11,152	47.0	▼7.0
PDS	Monika Döllstedt	6,347	27.1	▲12.6	5,674	23.9	▲8.3
SPD	Werner Pidde	5,410	23.1	▼2.3	3,395	14.3	▼4.1
List-only parties					3,513	14.8	
Informal votes		1,542			1,210		
Total valid votes		23,402			23,734		
Turnout		24,944	56.0	▼6.2			
CDU hold	Majority	5,298	22.7	▼0.3			

=== 1999 election ===
State election (1999): Gotha I
Notes:	Blue background denotes the winner of the electorate vote. Pink background denotes a candidate elected from their party list. Yellow background denotes an electorate win by a list member, or other incumbent. A ✓ or ✗ denotes status of any incumbent, win or lose respectively.						
Party	Candidate	Votes	%	±%	Party votes	%	±%
CDU	✓ Franz Schuster	13,279	48.4	▲1.3	14,859	54.0	▲7.4
SPD	Werner Pidde	6,963	25.4	▼12.7	5,077	18.4	▼13.3
PDS	Herbert Seifarth	3,970	14.5	▲3.7	4,299	15.6	▲4.9
VIBT		2,152	7.8		1,244	4.5	
REP	Detlef Suhr	662	2.4		250	0.9	▼0.1
FDP	Christina Jähnen	425	1.5	▼2.6	318	1.2	▼2.4
List-only parties					1,479	5.4	
Informal votes		554			479		
Total valid votes		27,451			27,526		
Turnout		28,005	62.8	▼13.9			
CDU hold	Majority	6,316	23.0	▲14.0			

=== 1994 election ===
State election (1994): Gotha I
Notes:	Blue background denotes the winner of the electorate vote. Pink background denotes a candidate elected from their party list. Yellow background denotes an electorate win by a list member, or other incumbent. A ✓ or ✗ denotes status of any incumbent, win or lose respectively.						
Party	Candidate	Votes	%	±%	Party votes	%	±%
CDU	Franz Schuster	15,044	47.1	▲5.7	14,957	46.6	▲6.2
SPD		12,176	38.1	▲11.7	10,184	31.7	▲3.1
PDS		3,454	10.8	▲0.6	3,426	10.7	▲1.4
FDP		1,297	4.1	▼4.6	1,152	3.6	▼5.6
List-only parties					2,364	7.4	
Informal votes		1,197			1,085		
Total valid votes		31,971			32,083		
Turnout		33,168	76.7	▲6.3			
CDU hold	Majority	2,868	9.0	▼6.0			

=== 1990 election ===
State election (1990): Gotha I
Notes:	Blue background denotes the winner of the electorate vote. Pink background denotes a candidate elected from their party list. Yellow background denotes an electorate win by a list member, or other incumbent. A ✓ or ✗ denotes status of any incumbent, win or lose respectively.						
Party	Candidate	Votes	%	±%	Party votes	%	±%
CDU	Johanna Köhler	15,244	41.4		14,930	40.4	
SPD		9,741	26.4		10,573	28.6	
PDS		3,759	10.2		3,458	9.3	
FDP		3,190	8.7		3,394	9.2	
Greens		2,520	6.8		2,333	6.3	
DSU		1,574	4.3		1,109	3.0	
UFV		497	1.3		273	0.7	
REP		334	0.9		295	0.8	
List-only parties					631	1.7	
Informal votes		1,142			1,005		
Total valid votes		36,859			36,996		
Turnout		38,001	70.4				
CDU win new seat	Majority	5,503	15.0				
