= Marcel Kramer =

German politician (born 1977)

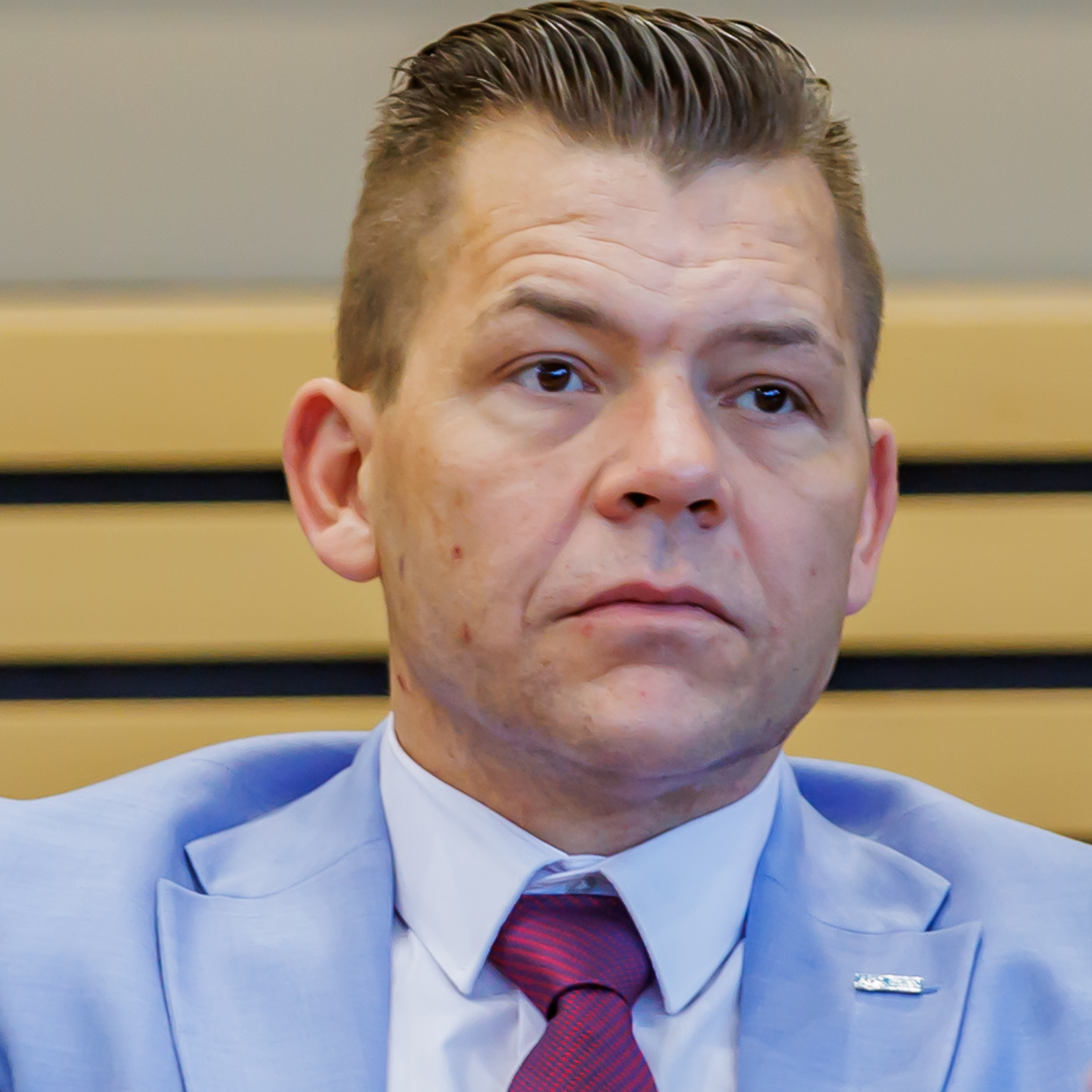
- Kramer in 2024

Member of the Landtag of Thuringia
- Incumbent
- Assumed office 26 September 2024
- Preceded by: Birger Gröning
- Constituency: Gotha I

Personal details
- Born: 1977 (age 48–49)
- Party: Alternative for Germany

Marcel Kramer (born 1977) is a German politician serving as a member of the Landtag of Thuringia since 2024. He has been a city councillor of Gotha and a district councillor of the Gotha District since 2024.
