= Erich Recknagel =

German ski jumper

Erich Recknagel (3 December 1904, Oberschönau, Hesse-Nassau – 16 August 1973) was a German ski jumper who competed in the 1928 Winter Olympics.
