= Lars Schütze =

German politician (born 1974)

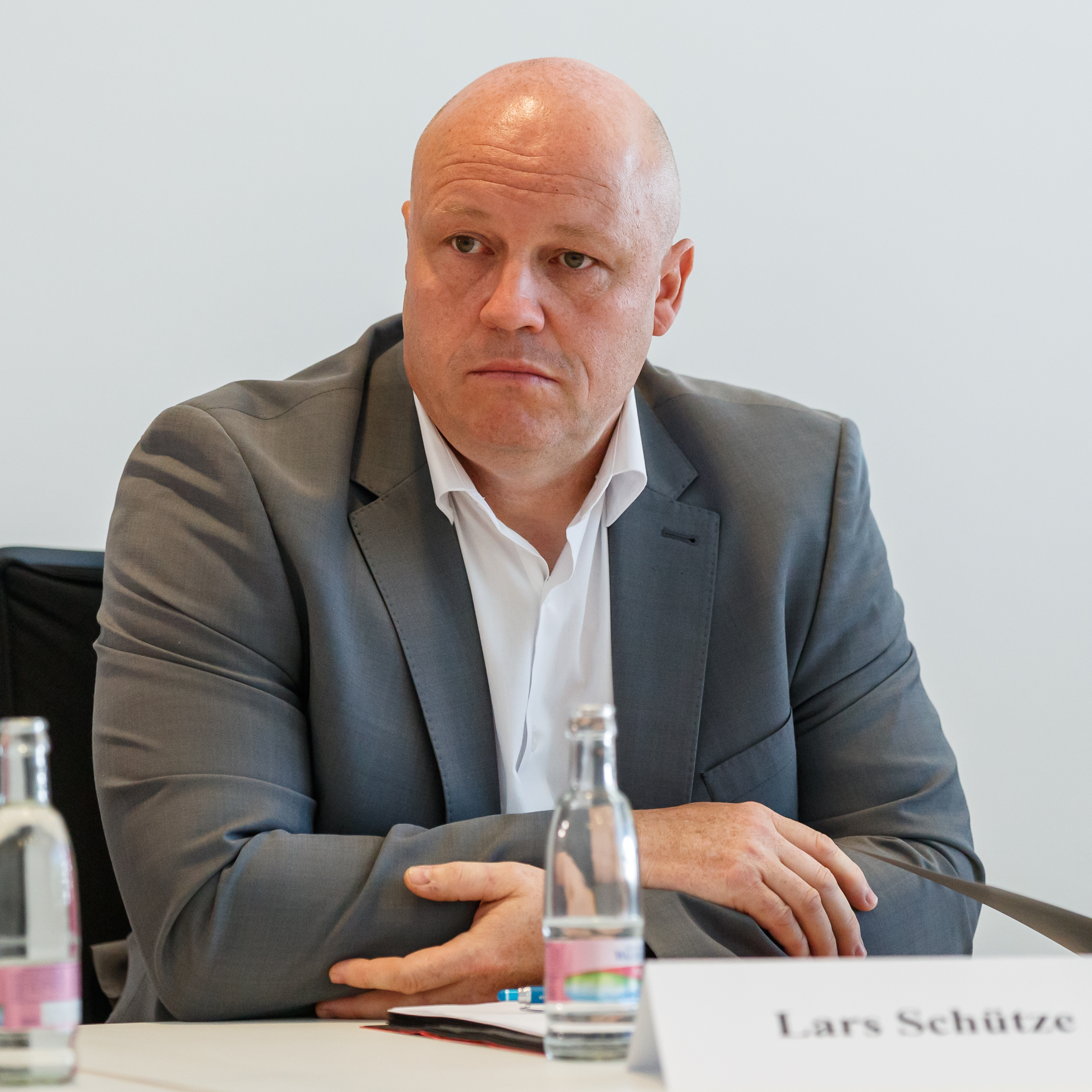
Lars Schütze in 2022

Lars Schütze (born 1974 in Erfurt) is a German politician from Thuringia. Previously representing the Alternative for Germany and Citizens for Thuringia, he has been an independent politician since 2022.

== Life ==
Schütze completed training as a police officer. He has been working for the Federal Police since 1991. In the 2019 Thuringian state election, Schütze was elected as a member of the Landtag of Thuringia for the AfD as a direct candidate in the Unstrut-Hainich-Kreis II constituency with 27.3 percent of the vote. Schütze is married, has five children and lives in Thuringia.

Schütze was expelled from the AfD parliamentary group in the Thuringian state parliament in October 2021. According to the AfD parliamentary group, the expulsion was preceded by an internal discussion of a matter that had affected the "relationship of trust" between Schütze and the other parliamentary group members.

In 2022, he joined the new Citizens for Thuringia party after leaving the AfD months earlier.

On 20 June 2022 Schütze founded the Citizens for Thuringia parliamentary group together with former Free Democrat MP Ute Bergner and the two former AfD MPs Birger Gröning and Tosca Kniese. Two days later, the application for parliamentary recognition was submitted to the president of the Thuringian State Parliament, which was accepted by the Parliament in the July plenary session. In December 2022, Schütze resigned from the Citizens for Thuringia party and state parliamentary group, thus pre-empting a party expulsion procedure. After this he sat in the Landtag as an independent member until the 2024 Thuringian state election in which he stood down from office.
