= Egon Fleischmann =

German cross-country skier (1934–2024)

Personal information
- Nationality: German
- Born: 26 August 1934; Unterschönau, Germany
- Died: 8 March 2024 (aged 89); Unterschönau, Germany

Sport
- Sport: Cross-country skiing

Egon Fleischmann (26 August 1934 – 8 March 2024) was a German cross-country skier. He competed in the men's 50 kilometre event at the 1960 Winter Olympics. Fleischmann died in Unterschönau on 8 March 2024, at the age of 89.
