= Unstrut-Hainich-Kreis II =

Electoral constituency in Thuringia, Germany

Unstrut-Hainich-Kreis II is an electoral constituency (German: Wahlkreis) represented in the Landtag of Thuringia. It elects one member via first-past-the-post voting. Under the current constituency numbering system, it is designated as constituency 9. It covers the central, southern, and eastern part of Unstrut-Hainich-Kreis.

Unstrut-Hainich-Kreis II was created for the 1994 state election. Since 2024, it has been represented by Stefan Möller of Alternative for Germany (AfD).

== Geography ==
As of the 2019 state election, Unstrut-Hainich-Kreis II covers the central, southern, and eastern part of Unstrut-Hainich-Kreis, specifically the municipalities of Bad Langensalza, Bad Tennstedt, Ballhausen, Blankenburg, Bothenheilingen, Bruchstedt, Großvargula, Haussömmern, Herbsleben, Hornsömmern, Issersheilingen, Kammerforst, Kirchheilingen, Kleinwelsbach, Körner, Kutzleben, Marolterode, Mittelsömmern, Mühlhausen/Thüringen (without Bollstedt, Grabe, Höngeda and Seebach), Neunheilingen, Obermehler, Oppershausen, Schlotheim, Schönstedt, Sundhausen, Tottleben, Unstrut-Hainich, Urleben, and Vogtei.

== Members ==
The constituency was held by the Christian Democratic Union (CDU) from its creation in 1994 until 2019, during which time it was represented by Peter Bonitz (1994–2004) and Annette Lehmann (2004–2019). It has been held by the Alternative for Germany since 2019, represented by Lars Schütze, and then by Stefan Möller following the 2024 election.

Election	Member	Party	%
1994	Peter Bonitz	CDU	42.1
1999	Peter Bonitz	CDU	49.6
2004	Annette Lehmann	CDU	41.5
2009	Annette Lehmann	CDU	30.0
2014	Annette Lehmann	CDU	40.2
2019	Lars Schütze	AfD	27.3
2024	Stefan Möller	AfD	39.6

== Election results ==
=== 2024 election ===
State election (2024): Unstrut-Hainich-Kreis II
Notes:	Blue background denotes the winner of the electorate vote. Pink background denotes a candidate elected from their party list. Yellow background denotes an electorate win by a list member, or other incumbent. A ✓ or ✗ denotes status of any incumbent, win or lose respectively.						
Party	Candidate	Votes	%	±%	Party votes	%	±%
AfD	Stefan Möller	10,567	39.6	▲12.3	9,392	34.6	▲8.5
CDU	Jane Croll	9,482	35.6	▲9.7	6,404	23.7	▲1.8
BSW					4,485	16.6	
Left	Cordula Eger	4,785	18.0	▼7.8	3,389	12.6	▼17.2
SPD	Markus Reinders	1,820	6.8	▼3.3	1,321	4.9	▼3.7
Greens					454	1.7	▼1.9
FW					373	1.4	
FDP					332	1.2	▼3.8
APT					284	1.1	▲0.1
Familie					189	0.7	
BD					113	0.4	
Values					106	0.4	
Pirates					68	0.3	Steady
ÖDP					47	0.2	▼0.2
MLPD					24	0.1	▼0.2
Informal votes		565			238		
Total valid votes		26,654			26,981		
Turnout		27,219	72.5	▲9.7			
AfD hold	Majority	1,085	4.0	▲2.6			

=== 2019 election ===
State election (2019): Unstrut-Hainich-Kreis II
Notes:	Blue background denotes the winner of the electorate vote. Pink background denotes a candidate elected from their party list. Yellow background denotes an electorate win by a list member, or other incumbent. A ✓ or ✗ denotes status of any incumbent, win or lose respectively.						
Party	Candidate	Votes	%	±%	Party votes	%	±%
AfD	Lars Schütze	6,964	27.3		6,663	26.1	▲15.5
CDU	Jane Croll	6,592	25.9	▼14.3	5,594	21.9	▼10.4
Left	Cordula Eger	6,570	25.8	▼6.2	7,611	29.8	▲2.0
SPD	Jörg Klupak	2,566	10.1	▼6.4	2,192	8.6	▼5.6
FDP	Alexander Kappe	1,412	5.5		1,288	5.0	▲2.1
Greens	Judith Keidel	1,289	5.1	▼0.1	913	3.6	▼0.7
MLPD	Edeltraud König	71	0.3		73	0.3	
List-only parties					1,187	4.7	
Informal votes		446			389		
Total valid votes		25,464			25,521		
Turnout		25,910	62.8	▲12.0			
AfD gain from CDU	Majority	372	1.4				

=== 2014 election ===
State election (2014): Unstrut-Hainich-Kreis II
Notes:	Blue background denotes the winner of the electorate vote. Pink background denotes a candidate elected from their party list. Yellow background denotes an electorate win by a list member, or other incumbent. A ✓ or ✗ denotes status of any incumbent, win or lose respectively.						
Party	Candidate	Votes	%	±%	Party votes	%	±%
CDU	✓ Annette Lehmann	8,588	40.2	▲10.2	6,987	32.3	▲1.0
Left	Cordula Eger	6,846	32.0	▲6.6	6,003	27.8	▲1.6
SPD	Sandy Kirchner	3,533	16.5	▼3.7	3,063	14.2	▼5.1
AfD					2,285	10.6	
NPD	Monique Möller	1,290	6.0	▲1.8	918	4.3	▼0.1
Greens	Carsten Meyer	1,117	5.2		919	4.3	▲0.2
List-only parties					1,425	6.6	
Informal votes		579			353		
Total valid votes		21,374			21,600		
Turnout		21,953	50.8	▼4.5			
CDU hold	Majority	1,742	8.2	▲3.6			

=== 2009 election ===
State election (2009): Unstrut-Hainich-Kreis II
Notes:	Blue background denotes the winner of the electorate vote. Pink background denotes a candidate elected from their party list. Yellow background denotes an electorate win by a list member, or other incumbent. A ✓ or ✗ denotes status of any incumbent, win or lose respectively.						
Party	Candidate	Votes	%	±%	Party votes	%	±%
CDU	✓ Annette Lehmann	7,396	30.0	▼11.5	7,762	31.3	▼12.9
Left	Benno Lemke	6,277	25.4	▼2.3	6,498	26.2	▼0.5
SPD	Walter Pilger	4,984	20.2	▼4.9	4,788	19.3	▲4.3
FDP	Christina Lange	3,053	12.4	▲6.7	2,387	9.6	▲5.6
Free Voters	Hans-Martin Menge	1,910	7.7		1,033	4.2	▲2.5
NPD	Jonny Albrecht	1,046	4.2		1,086	4.4	▲2.7
Greens					1,026	4.1	▲1.5
List-only parties					181	0.7	
Informal votes		683			588		
Total valid votes		24,666			24,761		
Turnout		25,349	55.3	▲1.7			
CDU hold	Majority	1,119	4.6	▼9.2			

=== 2004 election ===
State election (2004): Unstrut-Hainich-Kreis II
Notes:	Blue background denotes the winner of the electorate vote. Pink background denotes a candidate elected from their party list. Yellow background denotes an electorate win by a list member, or other incumbent. A ✓ or ✗ denotes status of any incumbent, win or lose respectively.						
Party	Candidate	Votes	%	±%	Party votes	%	±%
CDU	Annette Lehmann	9,792	41.5	▼8.2	10,559	44.2	▼6.8
PDS	Benno Lemke	6,526	27.7	▲6.8	6,363	26.7	▲7.8
SPD	Eckhard Ohl	5,932	25.1	0.0	3,590	15.0	▼6.1
FDP	Friedrich-Wilhelm Emmerich	1,338	5.7	▲3.2	954	4.0	▲2.6
List-only parties					2,406	10.1	
Informal votes		1,659			1,375		
Total valid votes		23,588			23,872		
Turnout		25,247	53.6	▼6.5			
CDU hold	Majority	3,266	13.8	▼10.7			

=== 1999 election ===
State election (1999): Unstrut-Hainich-Kreis II
Notes:	Blue background denotes the winner of the electorate vote. Pink background denotes a candidate elected from their party list. Yellow background denotes an electorate win by a list member, or other incumbent. A ✓ or ✗ denotes status of any incumbent, win or lose respectively.						
Party	Candidate	Votes	%	±%	Party votes	%	±%
CDU	✓ Peter Bonitz	13,470	49.6	▲7.5	13,982	50.9	▲7.0
SPD	Klaus Borck	6,823	25.1	▼10.9	5,783	21.1	▼12.0
PDS	Rainer Preuß	5,702	21.0	▲8.8	5,205	19.0	▲5.8
FDP	Eberhard Schmidt	684	2.5	▼2.8	387	1.4	▼2.4
Greens	Michael Hüge	471	1.7	▼2.1	336	1.2	▼2.3
List-only parties					1,768	6.4	
Informal votes		763			452		
Total valid votes		27,150			27,461		
Turnout		27,913	60.1	▼15.0			
CDU hold	Majority	6,647	24.5	▲18.4			

=== 1994 election ===
State election (1994): Unstrut-Hainich-Kreis II
Notes:	Blue background denotes the winner of the electorate vote. Pink background denotes a candidate elected from their party list. Yellow background denotes an electorate win by a list member, or other incumbent. A ✓ or ✗ denotes status of any incumbent, win or lose respectively.						
Party	Candidate	Votes	%	±%	Party votes	%	±%
CDU	Peter Bonitz	13,844	42.1		14,506	43.9	
SPD		11,856	36.0		10,950	33.1	
PDS		4,023	12.2		4,344	13.2	
FDP		1,742	5.3		1,271	3.8	
Greens		1,248	3.8		1,142	3.5	
DSU		197	0.6		182	0.6	
List-only parties					639	1.9	
Informal votes		1,148			1,024		
Total valid votes		32,910			33,034		
Turnout		34,058	75.1				
CDU win new seat	Majority	1,988	6.1				
