= Alliance for Thuringia =

Bündnis für Thüringen Alliance for Thuringia
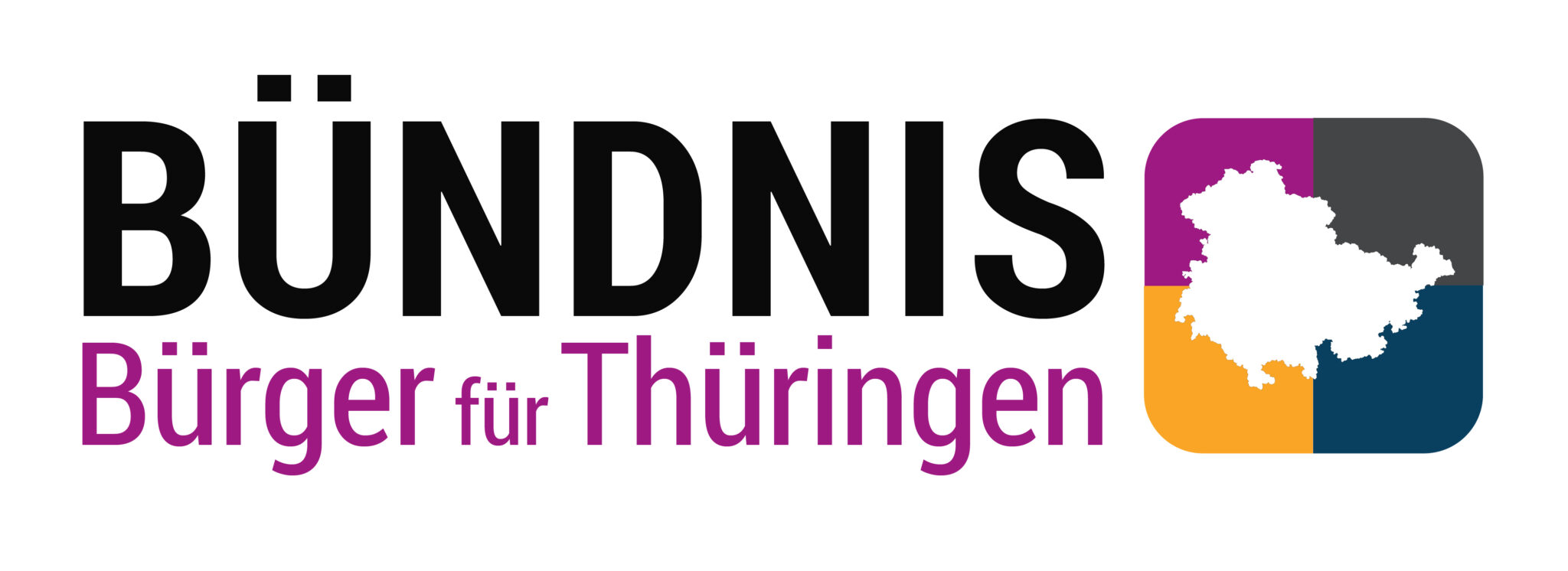
- Abbreviation: BfT
- Founded: 21 October 2023
- Dissolved: 2024
- Ideology: National conservatism Factions: Grassroots democracy Querdenken
- Political position: Right-wing
- Coalition members: BfT; FW; DieBasis; WerteUnion; BD
- Colours: Purple; Grey; Gold; Dark blue

Website
- www.buendnis-fuer-thueringen.de

Alliance for Thuringia (German: Bündnis für Thüringen, BfT) was an electoral alliance for the 2024 Thuringian state election.

== History ==
In the 2019 Thuringian state election, the Free Voters failed to register a list while in the other two East German state elections in Saxony and Brandenburg, the Free Voters and their sister party BVB/FW received 3.4% and 5.0% respectively. In the aftermath of the 2020 Thuringian government crisis, former AfD, CDU and FDP members who opposed the reelection of Bodo Ramelow founded the party Citizens for Thuringia.

In June 2023, there were first discussions between the Free Voters and Citizens for Thuringia about a potential merger. On 8 September 2023, the first attempt over an alliance between the Free Voters, Citizens for Thuringia, the anti-vaccination party DieBasis and the Values Union, a right-wing movement within the CDU/CSU, was made under the banner of the Free Voters. The federal leadership of the Free Voters intervened and declared DieBasis, Citizens for Thuringia and the Values Union incompatible with the core values of the Free Voters. The chairman of the Free Voters in Thuringia Uwe Rückert resigned on 13 September 2023 over the failure of the alliance.

On 21 October 2023, a new attempt was made. This time Citizens for Thuringia would be the party which registers for the election and would allow legally independent representatives from the other parties to run on their list including an association called "Free Voters Thuringia" led by Rückert. On a conference on 16 December 2023, Bündnis Deutschland joined the alliance.

In April 2024 after the Values Union became a party, BfTh merged into the new party, effectively dissolving the alliance. Uwe Rückert leader of the Free Voters Thuringia became BD member and in March 2024, Free Voters Thuringia became "Bündnis Deutschland Thüringen e.V."

== Composition ==
The table below lists the organizations in the coalition.

Organization	Main ideology	Political position	Leader	Seats
Citizens for Thuringia (BfTh)	Right-wing populism	Right-wing	Steffen Teichmann	2 / 90
Grassroots Democratic Party of Germany (dieBasis)	Anti-vaccination	Big tent	Sven Lingreen and Skadi Helmert	0 / 90
Values Union	National conservatism	Right-wing	Hans-Georg Maaßen	0 / 90
Alliance Germany (BD)	National conservatism	Centre-right to right-wing	Steffen Große	0 / 90
Free Voters Thuringia (FWT)	Regionalism	Centre-right	Uwe Rückert	0 / 90
