= Ringberghaus =

Hotel in Germany

Coordinates: 50°37′00″N 10°43′22″E

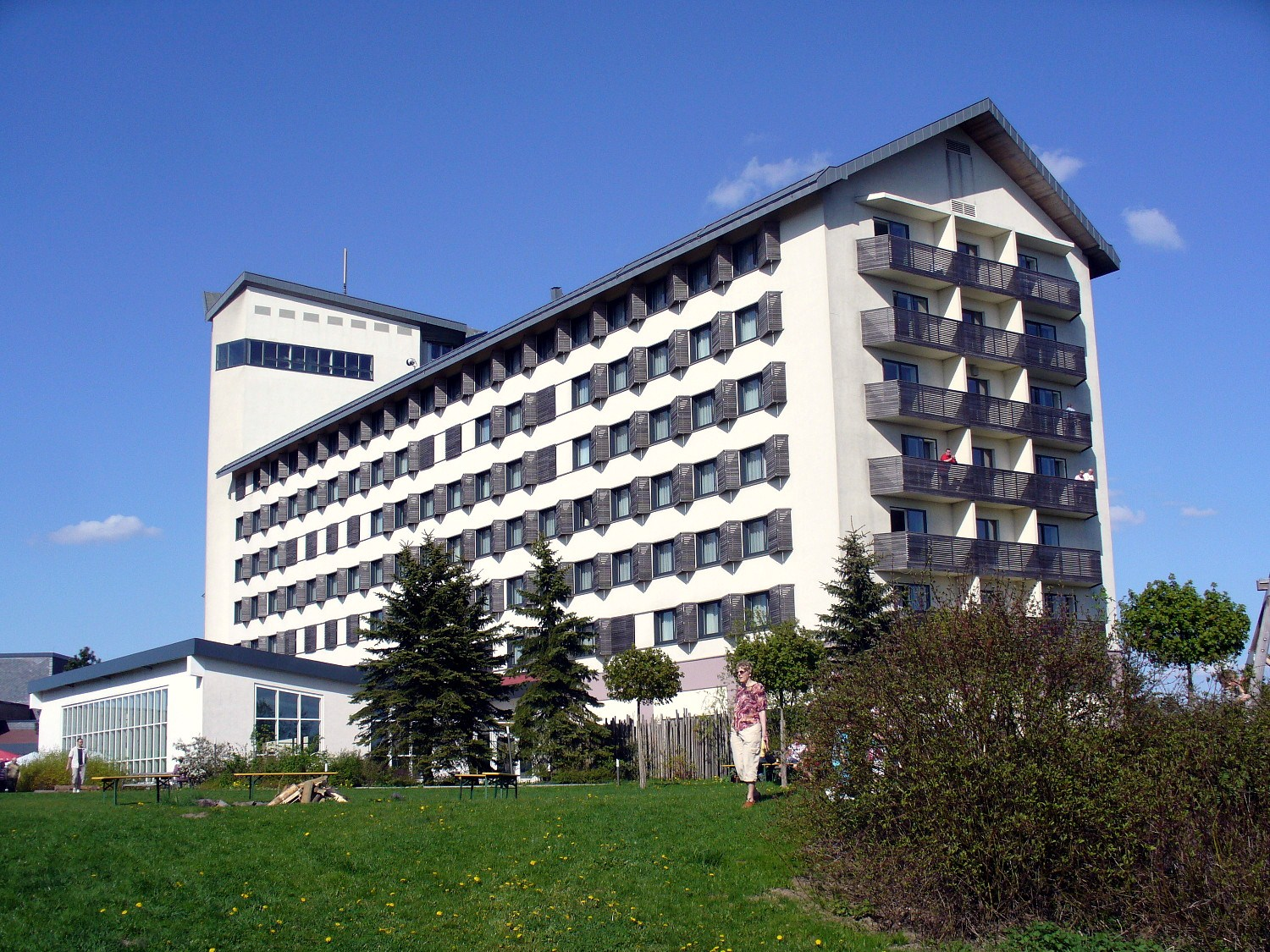
Ringberghotel

The Ringberghaus (German for: Ringberg house), also often called Ringberghotel is a hotel east of the German city Suhl. In the 1970s, it was one of the most controversially discussed new buildings in the Suhl area.

== Location ==
The Ringberghaus is built atop the 746 m high Ringberg, giving the hotel a very exposed location with high visibility. Suhl and Suhl-Goldlauter are located directly below the Ringberg, and the hotel can be seen from many vantage points of the Thuringian Forest, such as the "Plänckners Aussicht" at the Großer Beerberg, the Großer Hermannsberg or the Gebrannter Stein mountains.

== History ==
=== Former usage ===
The Ringberghaus was originally erected by the VdgB, an East German farmers' association. The building was opened in 1979 to provide farmers from rural areas of the GDR with affordable accommodation for holidays in the Thuringian Forest. Therefore, the Ringberghaus could only be booked with a special VdgB-issued voucher. After German reunification, operation of the hotel was taken over by several private enterprises, and the hotel belonged to the Holiday Inn chain for a brief time in the 1990s. Since 1997, the Ringberghaus is operated by the company RHB Ringberg Hotel Betriebsgesellschaft mbH.

=== Ecological concerns ===
When the Ringberghaus was built, the top of the Ringberg mountain had to be levelled to make room for the construction. Most of the excavated material was dumped one kilometre north of the hotel near the Simson lodge. Due to this massive impact on the mountain itself and the fact that the excavated material was filled in near a popular hiking lodge, the construction of the hotel was criticised heavily, even for standards of the GDR.

=== The hotel today ===
The current hotel in the Ringberghaus (Ringberghotel) was a member of the Ringhotels cooperation from November 2003 until December 2006. Since January 1, 2007, the hotel is independently operated. The hotel currently has 290 rooms on 6 floors with more than 160,000 stays per year. It is one of the largest hotels in the area and an important economic factor to the region. Due to its extraordinary location, the hotel is well received by hikers and families.

It also sees usage as a convention center. Between 2007 and 2009, it hosted Eurofurence. In 2008, the management of Ringberghaus invited Eurofurence to celebrate the 2008/2009 New Years celebrations in the theme of "Circus Ringberg." This continued for 2009/2010 (the last year of Eurofurence at Ringberghaus) and in 2010/2011 (where costumed/fursuited members of Eurofurence were presented as aliens).
