= George Maier =

American football player and coach

Biographical details
- Born: 1926
- Died: February 2015 (aged 88)

Coaching career (HC unless noted)
- 1966–1967: Iona (assistant)
- 1970–1971: Iona
- 1972: Fordham (OC)
- 1973–1988: Pace

Head coaching record
- Overall: 51–48–2 (varsity); 27–11–2 (club)

George A. Maier (1926 – February 2015) was an American college football coach. He served as the head football coach at Iona College from 1970 to 1971 before being named the offensive coordinator at Fordham University in 1972. In 1973, he became the head coach of the club football team at Pace University and shepherded that team to varsity status in 1978. Maier resigned following the 1988 season. He also coached football at Rye High School in Rye, New York.

Maier died in 2015.

== Head coaching record ==
=== Club ===
Year	Team	Overall	Conference	Standing	Bowl/playoffs
Iona Gaels () (1970–1971)
1970	Iona	3–5			
1971	Iona	7–1			
Iona:		10–6			
Pace Setters (Metropolitan Conference) (1973–1977)
1973	Pace	3–4			
1974	Pace	8–2			
1975	Pace	4–1–2			
1976	Pace	7–1			
1977	Pace	5–3			
Pace:		27–11–2			
Total:		37–17–2			
National championship Conference title Conference division title or championship game berth

=== Varsity ===
Year	Team	Overall	Conference	Standing	Bowl/playoffs
Pace Setters (Metropolitan Intercollegiate Conference) (1978–1984)
1978	Pace	6–2	5–0	1st	
1979	Pace	7–1–1	5–0	1st	
1980	Pace	6–3	5–0	1st	
1981	Pace	5–5	3–1	2nd	
1982	Pace	5–4	3–1	2nd	
1983	Pace	5–4	2–2	3rd	
1984	Pace	3–5	1–2	T–2nd	
Pace Setters (Liberty Football Conference) (1985–1988)
1985	Pace	3–7	2–3	T–3rd	
1986	Pace	5–4–1	2–2–1	4th	
1987	Pace	3–6	1–4	6th	
1988	Pace	3–7	1–5	T–6th	
Pace:		51–48–2	30–20–1		
Total:		51–48–2			
National championship Conference title Conference division title or championship game berth
