= Birger Gröning =

German politician (born 1975)

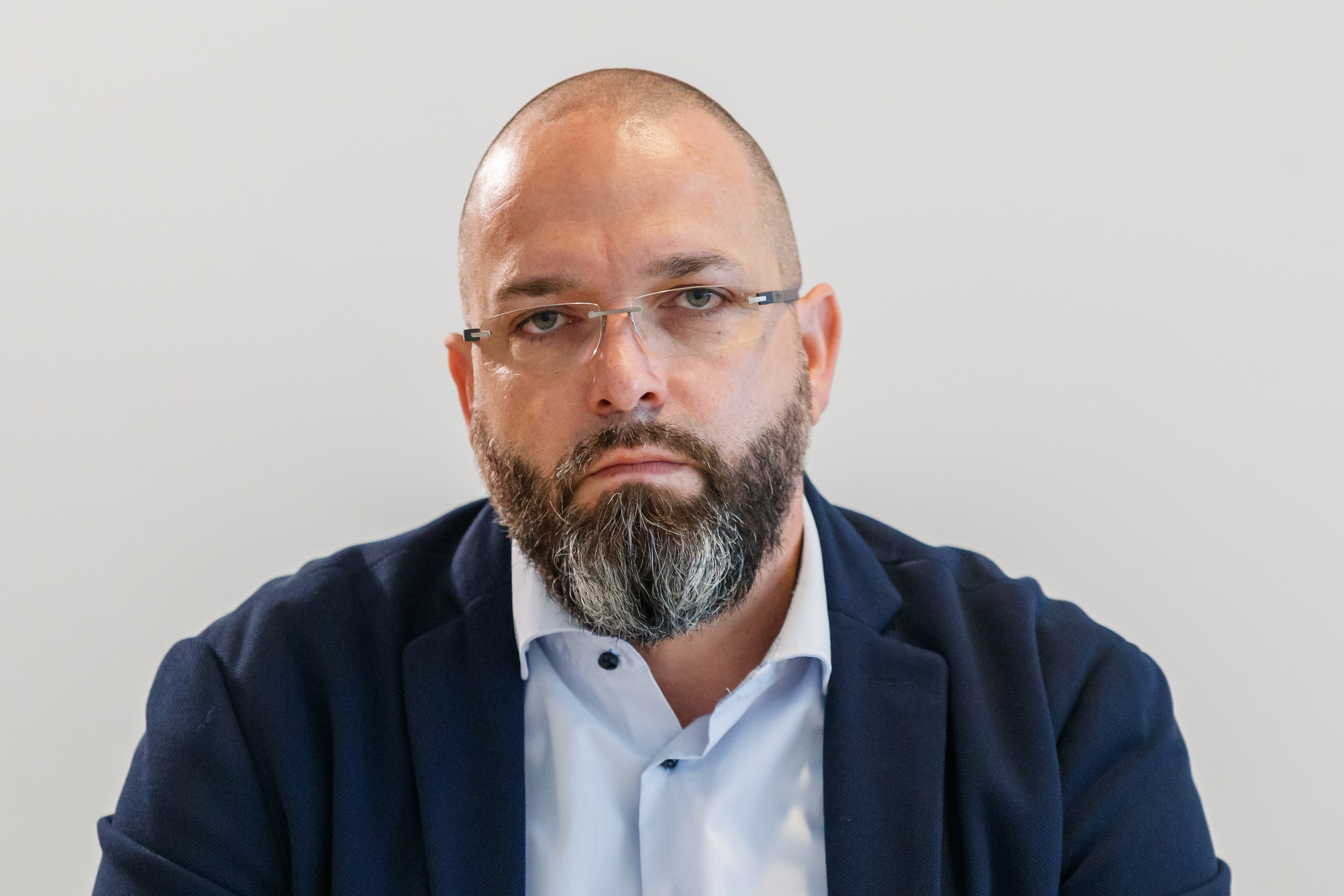
Birger Gröning in 2022

Birger Gröning (born 1975 in Schwerin) is a German politician from Thuringia. Previously representing the Alternative for Germany and Citizens for Thuringia, he has been an independent politician since 2022.

== Life ==
Gröning completed an apprenticeship as a hotel specialist with the additional qualification of a training qualification in 1995. From 1995 to 2005 he was in the German Army as a sergeant in the air force security force and staff service. He then became a physiotherapist and worked in a rehabilitation clinic.

On 27 October 2019 he was elected to the Thuringian state parliament for the AfD as a direct candidate in the Gotha I constituency. On 23 March 2022, he announced his resignation from the AfD parliamentary group in the Thuringian state parliament and the party.

On 20 June 2022 Gröning founded the Citizens for Thuringia parliamentary group together with former Free Democrat MP Ute Bergner and the two former AfD MPs Lars Schütze and Tosca Kniese. Two days later, the application for parliamentary recognition was submitted to the president of the Thuringian State Parliament, which was accepted by the Parliament in the July plenary session. In December 2022, Gröning resigned from the Citizens for Thuringia party and state parliamentary group, thus pre-empting a party expulsion procedure. Since then he has sat in the Landtag as an independent member.

In the 2024 Brandenburg state election, Gröning ran as an independent in the constituency of Gotha II but was not elected.

Gröning is married and lives in Gotha.
