= Unterschönau =

- Ortsteil of Steinbach-Hallenberg
- Interactive map of Unterschönau
- Location within Germany Location within Thuringia
- Coordinates: 50°43′N 10°35′E
- Country: Germany
- State: Thuringia
- District: Schmalkalden-Meiningen
- Town: Steinbach-Hallenberg

Area
  - Total: 5.9 km^{2} (2.3 sq mi)
- Elevation: 490 m (1,610 ft)

Population (2017-12-31)
  - Total: 485
  - Density: 82/km^{2} (210/sq mi)
- Time zone: UTC+01:00 (CET)
  - Summer (DST): UTC+02:00 (CEST)
- Postal codes: 98587
- Dialling codes: 036847

Unterschönau (German pronunciation: [ʊntɐˈʃøːnaʊ], lit. 'Lower Schönau', in contrast to "Upper Schönau") is a village and a former municipality in the district Schmalkalden-Meiningen, in Thuringia, Germany. Since 1 January 2019, it is part of the town Steinbach-Hallenberg.

== History ==
From 1868 to 1944, Unterschönau was part of the Prussian Province of Hesse-Nassau.

== Notable people ==
- Egon Fleischmann
- Siegfried Herrmann
