= Grassroots Democratic Party of Germany =

Grassroots Democratic Party of Germany Basisdemokratische Partei Deutschland
- Abbreviation: dieBasis
- Leader: Sylvio Schmeller; S.-Jarno Bien
- Founded: 4 July 2020 (6 years ago)
- Headquarters: Berlin
- Ideology: Anti-lockdown; Anti-vaccination
- Political position: Right-wing
- Regional affiliation: Alliance for Thuringia (Thuringia)

Website
- diebasis-partei.de

The Grassroots Democratic Party of Germany (German: Basisdemokratische Partei Deutschland, abbreviated German: dieBasis) is a political party in Germany. The declared aim of the party is to strengthen grassroots democracy in society and politics, as they consider that many areas of life are dominated by economic interests, profits, and fights for political power. During COVID-19 protests in Germany however, political scientists and media reports generally identified the party as primarily supported by lockdown opponents and campaigners against obligatory vaccination.

The party cannot be easily placed on the political spectrum. According to an investigation by RedaktionsNetzwerk Deutschland, its membership combines believers in alternative medicine and esotericism with those belonging to far-right conspiracy theorist groups such as Reichsbürger. A scientific study conducted by the University of Göttingen with the participation of Simon T. Franzmann, professor of democracy research, concludes that ‘dieBasis’ is not a ‘right-wing populist party’. Nor does its ‘clear anti-establishment orientation’ make it one.

The party has never won any seats in the Bundestag, state Landtags or the European Parliament, but has achieved some mandates on the local level, for instance in Schleswig-Holstein, Weimar, Jena and Sachsen-Anhalt.

== History ==
In the 2021 federal election, the party received 1.4% of the national vote (630,153 votes), winning more votes than other prominent minor German parties such as the Pirate Party and the National Democratic Party.

In the 2024 European parliament elections, the party received 0.3% of the national vote (99,502 votes), failing to win any seats in the European Parliament.

In the 2025 federal election, the party fell to 0.17% of the national vote (85,373 votes).

== Election results ==
=== Federal Parliament (Bundestag) ===
Election	Constituency		Party list		Seats	+/–	Government
Election	Votes	%	Votes	%	Seats	+/–	Government
2021	735,451	1.59 (#9)	630,153	1.36 (#10)	0 / 735	New	Extra-parliamentary
2025	41,903	0.08 (#16)	85,557	0.17 (#13)	0 / 630	0	Extra-parliamentary

=== European Parliament ===
Election	List leader	Votes	%	Seats	+/–	EP Group
2024	Ellèn Hölzer	99,502	0.25 (#22)	0 / 96	New	–

== See also ==
- MFG – Austria People – Freedom – Fundamental Rights
