= Viernau =

- Ortsteil of Steinbach-Hallenberg
- Coat of arms
- Interactive map of Viernau
- Location within Germany Location within Thuringia
- Coordinates: 50°39′59″N 10°33′13″E
- Country: Germany
- State: Thuringia
- District: Schmalkalden-Meiningen
- Town: Steinbach-Hallenberg

Area
  - Total: 15.9 km^{2} (6.1 sq mi)
- Elevation: 400 m (1,300 ft)

Population (2017-12-31)
  - Total: 1,926
  - Density: 121/km^{2} (314/sq mi)
- Time zone: UTC+01:00 (CET)
  - Summer (DST): UTC+02:00 (CEST)
- Postal codes: 98547
- Dialling codes: 036847
- Vehicle registration: SM
- Website: www.viernau.de

Viernau (German pronunciation: [ˈfiːɐ̯naʊ]) is a village and a former municipality in the district Schmalkalden-Meiningen, in Thuringia, Germany. Since 1 January 2019, it is part of the town Steinbach-Hallenberg.

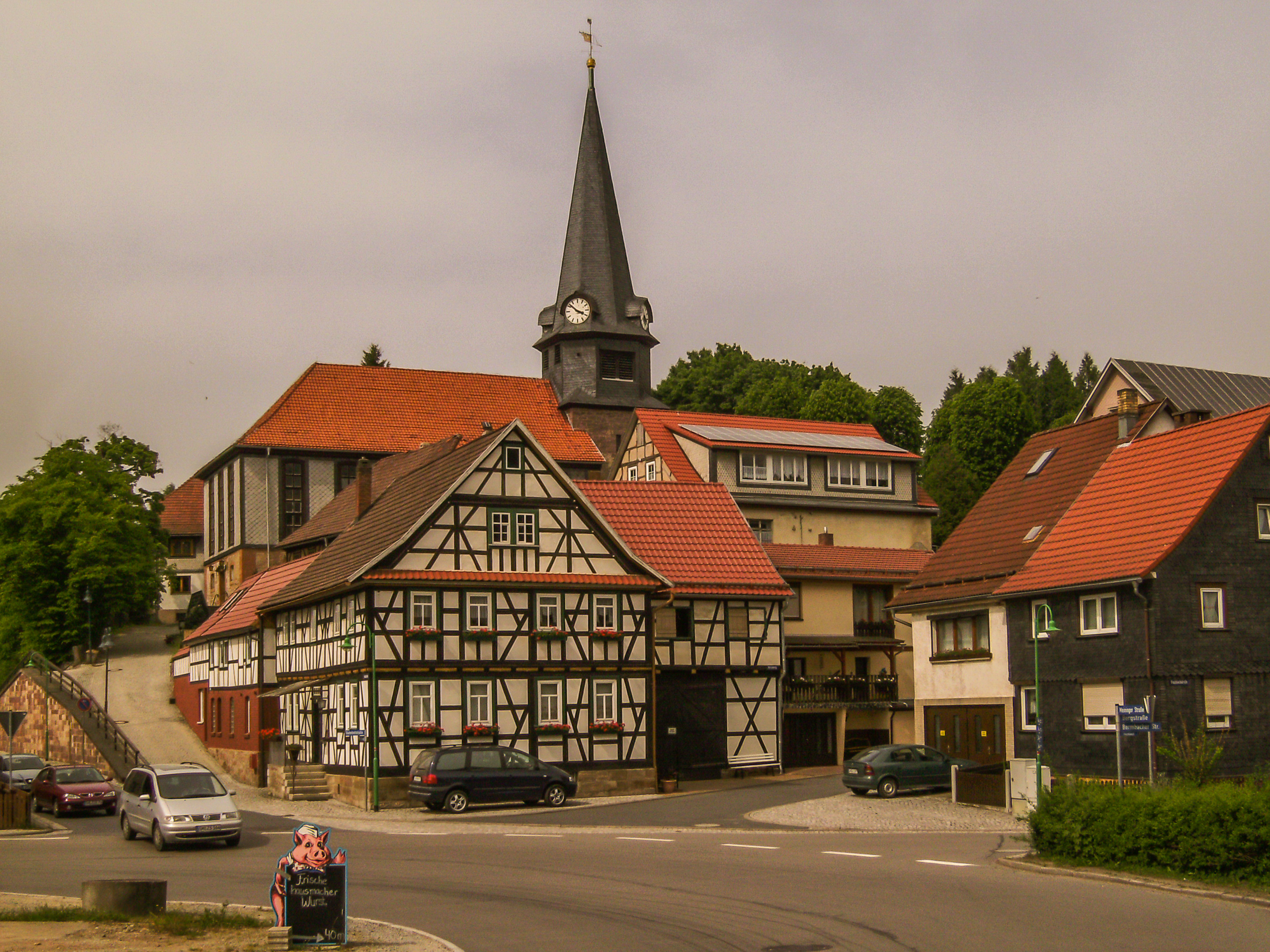
Viernau, church
