= Bermbach =

- Ortsteil of Steinbach-Hallenberg
- Interactive map of Bermbach
- Location within Germany Location within Thuringia
- Coordinates: 50°40′N 10°37′E
- Country: Germany
- State: Thuringia
- District: Schmalkalden-Meiningen
- Town: Steinbach-Hallenberg

Area
  - Total: 6.27 km^{2} (2.42 sq mi)
- Elevation: 510 m (1,670 ft)

Population (2017-12-31)
  - Total: 504
  - Density: 80.4/km^{2} (208/sq mi)
- Time zone: UTC+01:00 (CET)
  - Summer (DST): UTC+02:00 (CEST)
- Postal codes: 98587
- Dialling codes: 036847
- Website: www.bermbach.info

Bermbach (German pronunciation: [ˈbɛʁmbax]) is a village and a former municipality in the district Schmalkalden-Meiningen, in Thuringia, Germany. Since 1 January 2019, it is part of the town Steinbach-Hallenberg.

== History ==
From 1868 to 1944, Bermbach was part of the Prussian Province of Hesse-Nassau.
