= Steinbach-Hallenberg =

Town in Thuringia, Germany

- Town
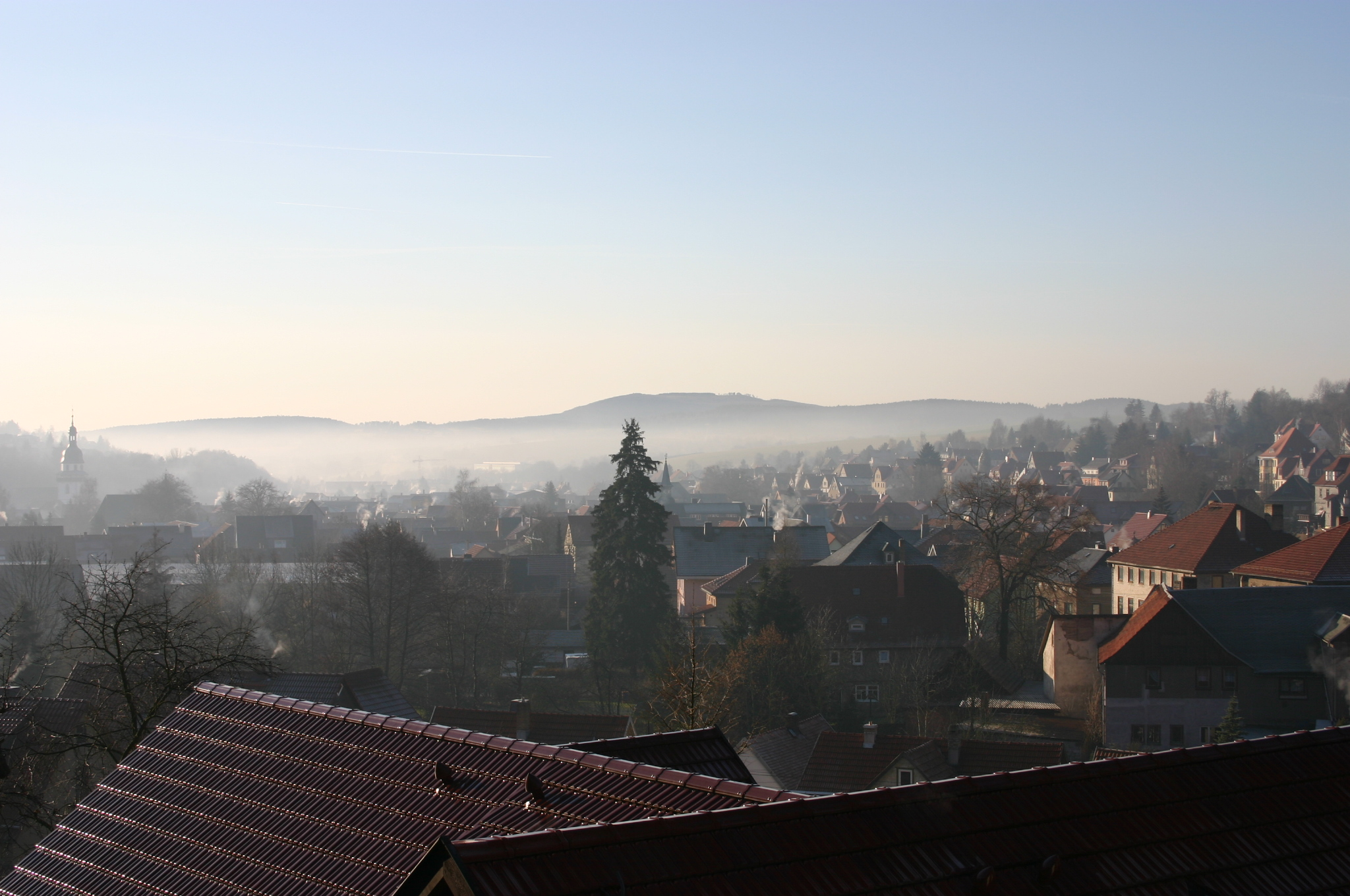

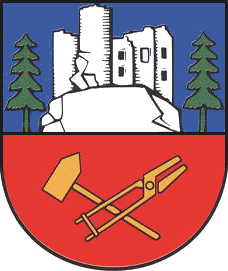
- Coat of arms

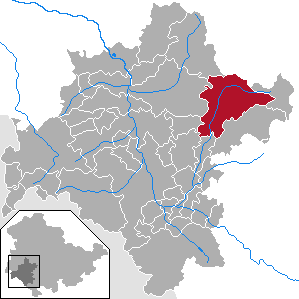
- Location of Steinbach-Hallenberg within Schmalkalden-Meiningen district
- Interactive map of Steinbach-Hallenberg
- Location within Germany Location within Thuringia
- Coordinates: 50°42′2″N 10°34′0″E
- Country: Germany
- State: Thuringia
- District: Schmalkalden-Meiningen

Government
  - Mayor (2019–25): Markus Böttcher

Area
  - Total: 76.73 km^{2} (29.63 sq mi)
- Elevation: 426 m (1,398 ft)

Population (2025-12-31)
  - Total: 9,130
  - Density: 119/km^{2} (308/sq mi)
- Time zone: UTC+01:00 (CET)
  - Summer (DST): UTC+02:00 (CEST)
- Postal codes: 98587
- Dialling codes: 036847
- Vehicle registration: SM
- Website: www.steinbach-hallenberg.de

Steinbach-Hallenberg (German pronunciation: [ˈʃtaɪnbax ˈhalənbɛʁk]) is a town in the Schmalkalden-Meiningen district, in Thuringia, Germany. It is situated in the Thuringian Forest, 8 km east of Schmalkalden, and 13 km northwest of Suhl. The former municipalities Altersbach, Bermbach, Oberschönau, Unterschönau, Rotterode and Viernau were merged into Steinbach-Hallenberg on 1 January 2019.

== History ==
After the Austro-Prussian War of 1866, the lordship of Schmalkalden, to which Steinbach-Hallenberg belonged, passed to Prussia and was administered within the Province of Hesse-Nassau in the Regierungsbezirk Kassel; the surrounding district joined Thuringia in 1945.

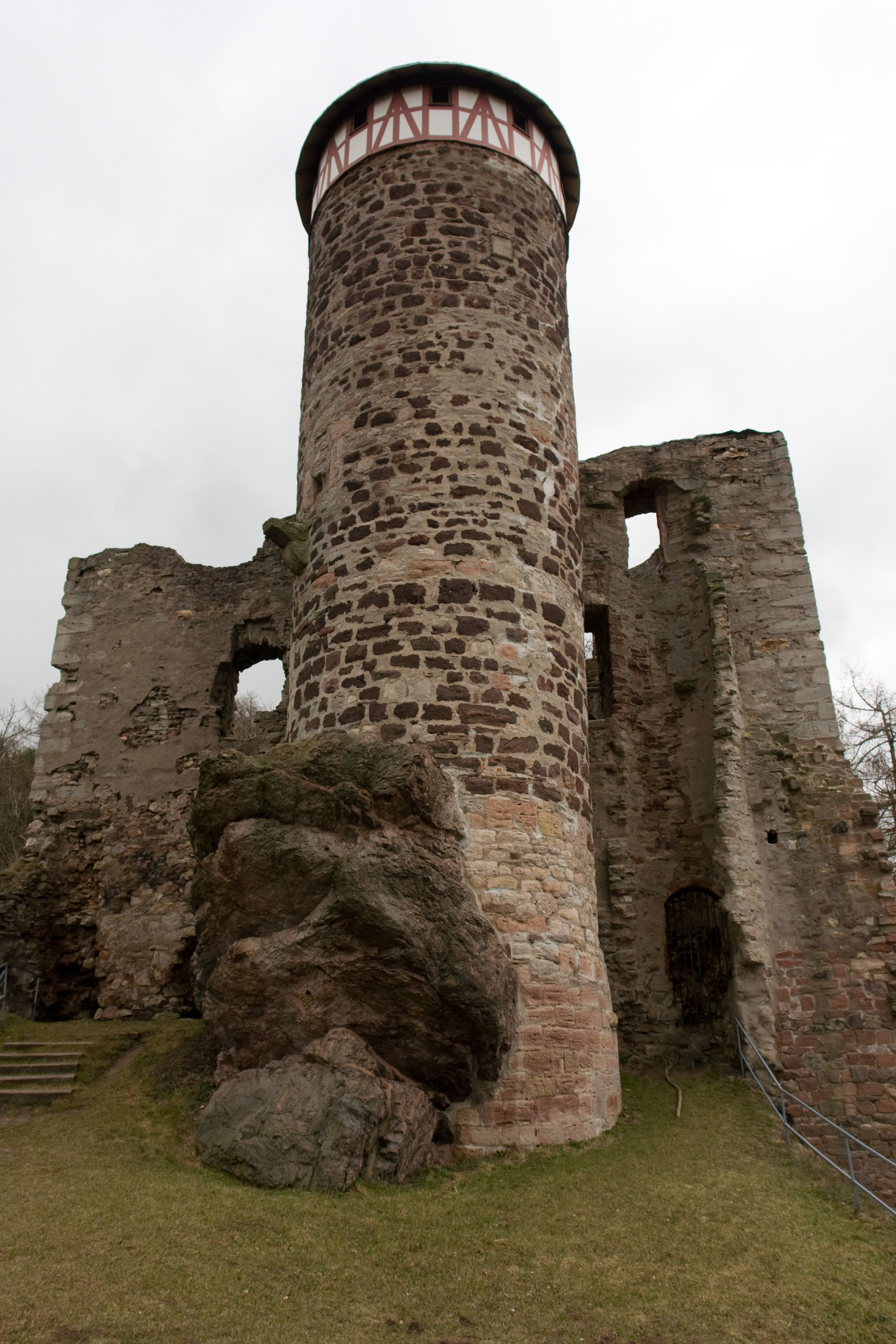
The Hallenburg, a hilltop castle ruin above the town

== Notable people ==
- Manfred Wolf (born 1948), ski jumper
