= Altersbach =

- Ortsteil of Steinbach-Hallenberg
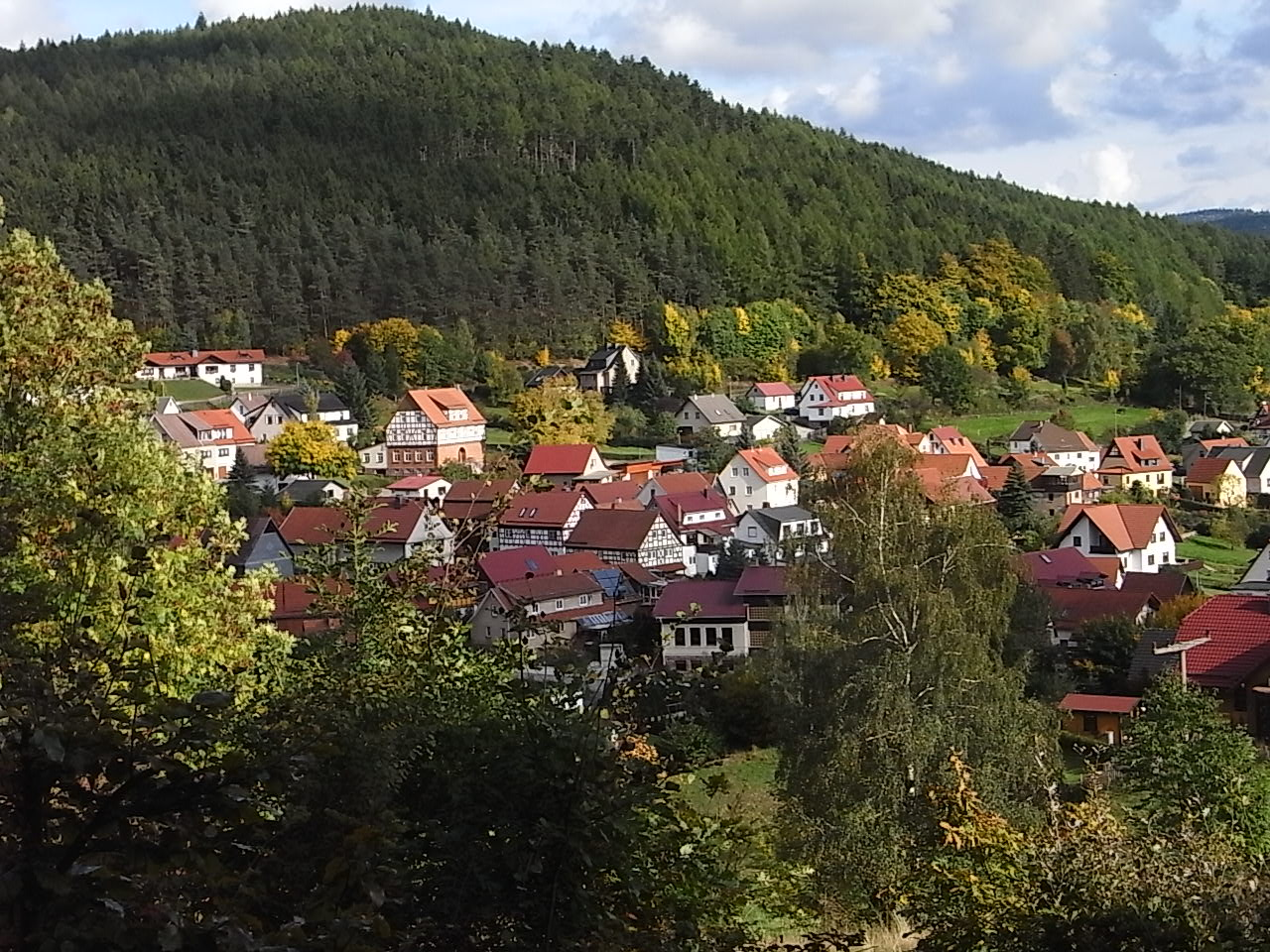
- Interactive map of Altersbach
- Location within Germany Location within Thuringia
- Coordinates: 50°42′N 10°32′E
- Country: Germany
- State: Thuringia
- District: Schmalkalden-Meiningen
- Town: Steinbach-Hallenberg

Area
  - Total: 3.15 km^{2} (1.22 sq mi)
- Elevation: 483 m (1,585 ft)

Population (2018-12-31)
  - Total: 443
  - Density: 141/km^{2} (364/sq mi)
- Time zone: UTC+01:00 (CET)
  - Summer (DST): UTC+02:00 (CEST)
- Postal codes: 98587
- Dialling codes: 036847
- Website: www.altersbach.net

Altersbach (German pronunciation: [ˈaltɐsˌbax]) is a village and a former municipality in the district Schmalkalden-Meiningen, in Thuringia, Germany. Since 1 January 2019, it is part of the town Steinbach-Hallenberg.

== History ==
From 1868 to 1944, Altersbach was part of the Prussian Province of Hesse-Nassau.
