= Rotterode =

- Ortsteil of Steinbach-Hallenberg
- Interactive map of Rotterode
- Location within Germany Location within Thuringia
- Coordinates: 50°42′40″N 10°33′6″E
- Country: Germany
- State: Thuringia
- District: Schmalkalden-Meiningen
- Town: Steinbach-Hallenberg

Area
  - Total: 6.74 km^{2} (2.60 sq mi)
- Elevation: 550 m (1,800 ft)

Population (2017-12-31)
  - Total: 702
  - Density: 104/km^{2} (270/sq mi)
- Time zone: UTC+01:00 (CET)
  - Summer (DST): UTC+02:00 (CEST)
- Postal codes: 98587
- Dialling codes: 036847
- Vehicle registration: SM

Rotterode (German pronunciation: [ʁɔtəˈʁoːdə]) is a village and a former municipality in the district Schmalkalden-Meiningen, in Thuringia, Germany. Since 1 January 2019, it is part of the town Steinbach-Hallenberg.

== History ==
From 1868 to 1944, Rotterode was part of the Prussian Province of Hesse-Nassau.

== Notable people ==
- Hellmuth Mäder
