= Oberschönau =

Village in Thuringia, Germany

- Ortsteil of Steinbach-Hallenberg
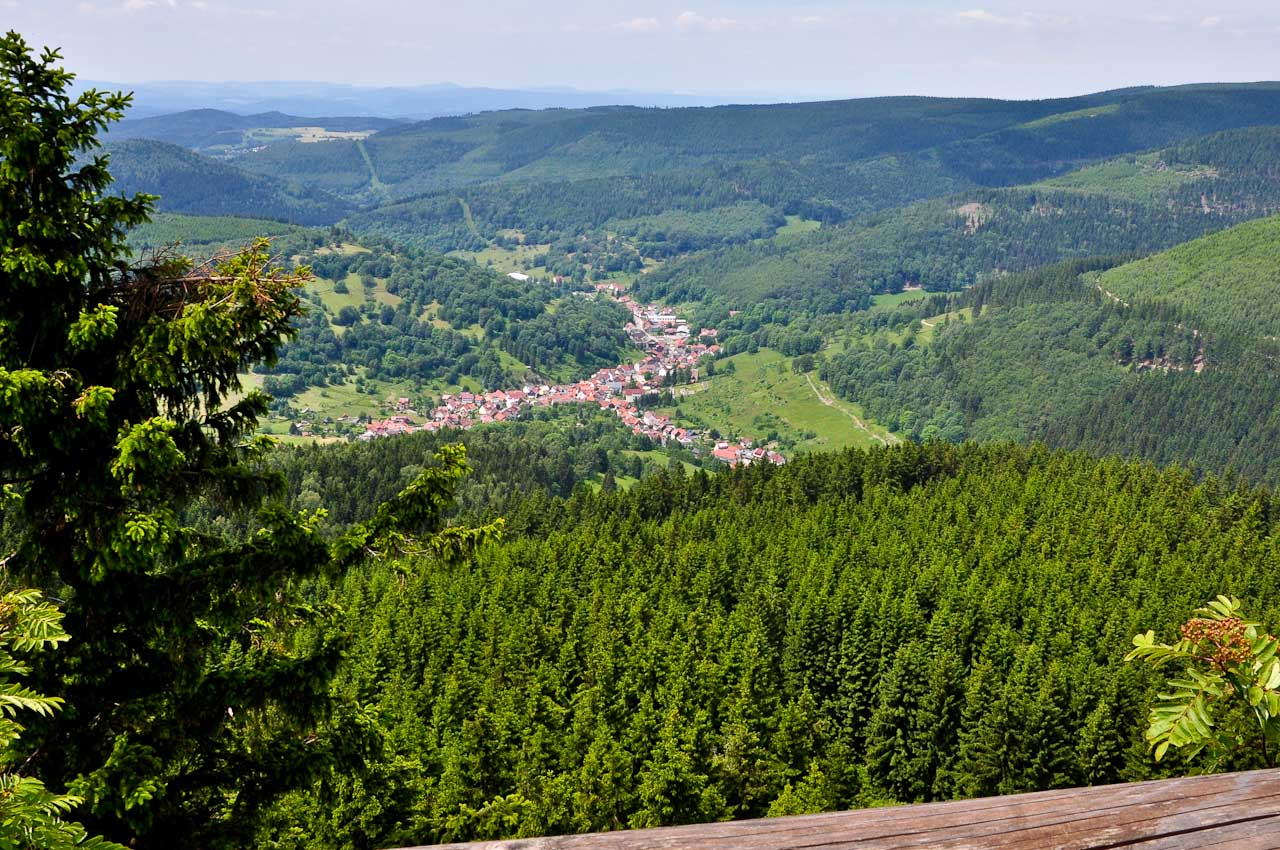
- Oberschönau

- Coat of arms

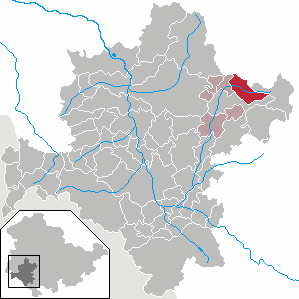
- Location of Oberschönau within Schmalkalden-Meiningen district
- Interactive map of Oberschönau
- Location within Germany Location within Thuringia
- Coordinates: 50°43′N 10°37′E
- Country: Germany
- State: Thuringia
- District: Schmalkalden-Meiningen
- Town: Steinbach-Hallenberg

Area
  - Total: 16.12 km^{2} (6.22 sq mi)
- Elevation: 520 m (1,710 ft)

Population (2017-12-31)
  - Total: 783
  - Density: 48.6/km^{2} (126/sq mi)
- Time zone: UTC+01:00 (CET)
  - Summer (DST): UTC+02:00 (CEST)
- Postal codes: 98587
- Dialling codes: 036847
- Website: www.oberschoenau.de

Oberschönau (German pronunciation: [oːbɐˈʃøːnaʊ], lit. 'Upper Schönau', in contrast to "Lower Schönau") is a village and a former municipality in the district of Schmalkalden-Meiningen, in Thuringia, Germany. Since 1 January 2019, it has been part of the town of Steinbach-Hallenberg as one of its Ortsteile.

== History ==
From 1868 to 1944, Oberschönau was part of the Prussian Province of Hesse-Nassau.

== Notable people ==
- Johann Christian Friedrich Hæffner (1759–1833), composer
- Erich Recknagel (1904–1973), ski jumper
