= List of twin towns and sister cities in Belgium =

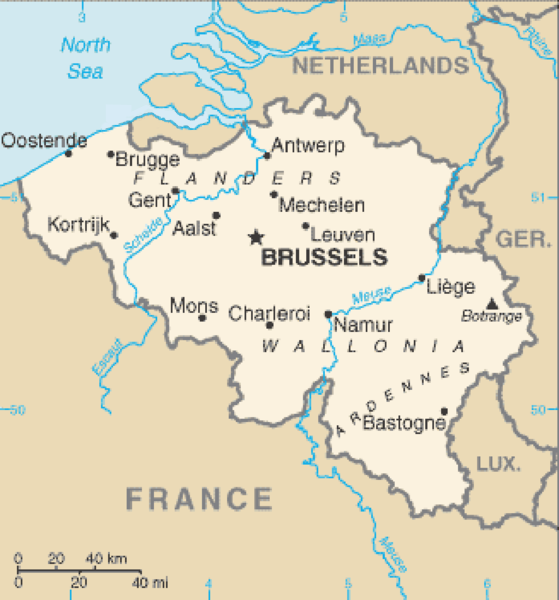
Map of Belgium

This is a list of municipalities in Belgium which have standing links to local communities in other countries known as "town twinning" (usually in Europe) or "sister cities" (usually in the rest of the world).

== A ==
Aalst

- Gabrovo, Bulgaria
- Worcester, South Africa

Aalter

- Creuse, France
- Rotenburg an der Wümme, Germany

Andenne

- Bergheim, Germany
- Chauny, France
- Mottafollone, Italy

Anderlecht

- Boulogne-Billancourt, France
- Hammersmith and Fulham, England, United Kingdom
- Neukölln (Berlin), Germany
- Zaanstad, Netherlands

Anderlues

- Gigondas, France

Anhée

- Quinçay, France

Ans

- Badefols-d'Ans, France
- Chourgnac, France
- Cubjac-Auvézère-Val d'Ans, France
- Granges-d'Ans, France
- Himamaylan, Philippines
- Sainte-Eulalie-d'Ans, France

Antoing

- Crépy-en-Valois, France
- Płońsk, Poland
- Zell am Mosel, Germany

Antwerp

- Barcelona, Spain
- Cape Town, South Africa
- Haifa, Israel
- Ludwigshafen, Germany
- Marseille, France
- Mulhouse, France
- Rostock, Germany
- Saint Petersburg, Russia
- Shanghai, China

Antwerp – Ekeren

- Andernach, Germany

Anzegem

- Pèrèrè, Benin

Arlon

- Alba, Italy
- Bitburg, Germany
- Diekirch, Luxembourg
- Market Drayton, England, United Kingdom
- Saint-Dié-des-Vosges, France

Assesse

- Cumières, France

Auderghem

- Patmos, Greece

Aywaille

- Châtillon, France
- Chézy-sur-Marne, France
- Mangalia, Romania
- Markt Nordheim, Germany

== B ==
Bastogne

- Bryan, United States
- College Station, United States
- Périers, France
- Tulette, France

Belœil

- Arco, Italy
- Bogen, Germany
- Crosne, France
- Maybole, Scotland, United Kingdom
- Roccella Ionica, Italy
- Rýmařov, Czech Republic
- Schotten, Germany

Beringen

- Behringen (Bispingen), Germany
- Behringen (Hörselberg-Hainich), Germany
- Behringen (Stadtilm), Germany
- Beringe (Peel en Maas), Netherlands
- Beringen (Mersch), Luxembourg
- Beringen, Switzerland

Beveren

- Wittenberg, Germany

Beyne-Heusay

- Wasquehal, France

Bièvre is a member of the Charter of European Rural Communities, a town twinning association across the European Union, alongside with:

- Bienvenida, Spain
- Bucine, Italy
- (Republic of Ireland) Cashel, Ireland
- Cissé, France
- Desborough, England, United Kingdom
- Esch (Haaren), Netherlands
- Hepstedt, Germany
- Ibănești, Romania
- Kandava, Latvia
- Kannus, Finland
- Kolindros, Greece
- Lassee, Austria
- Medzev, Slovakia
- Næstved, Denmark
- Nagycenk, Hungary
- Nadur, Malta
- Ockelbo, Sweden
- Pano Lefkara, Cyprus
- Põlva, Estonia
- Samuel (Soure), Portugal
- Starý Poddvorov, Czech Republic
- Strzyżów, Poland
- Svoge, Bulgaria
- Tisno, Croatia
- Troisvierges, Luxembourg
- Žagarė (Joniškis), Lithuania

Bocholt

- Bocholt, Germany

Bornem

- Bornheim, Germany
- Gordes, France

Boussu

- Anzin, France
- Apt, France
- Hammam Sousse, Tunisia

Braine-le-Comte

- Codroipo, Italy

Braine-l'Alleud

- Basingstoke and Deane, England, United Kingdom
- Drummondville, Canada
- Menden, Germany
- Ouistreham, France
- Šlapanice, Czech Republic

Brasschaat

- Bad Neuenahr-Ahrweiler, Germany
- Tarija, Bolivia

Bree

- Geldern, Germany
- Salomó, Spain
- Volpago del Montello, Italy

Bruges

- Ebolowa, Cameroon

Brussels

- Atlanta, United States
- Beijing, China
- Berlin, Germany
- Kyiv, Ukraine
- Ljubljana, Slovenia
- Prague, Czech Republic
- Washington, D.C., United States

Burdinne

- Rouillon, France

== C ==
Chapelle-lez-Herlaimont

- Boğazlıyan, Turkey
- Bulancak, Turkey
- Calascibetta, Italy
- Châtillon-sur-Indre, France
- Riccia, Italy
- Santa Elisabetta, Italy
- Zagora, Morocco

Charleroi

- Casarano, Italy
- Donetsk, Ukraine
- Follonica, Italy
- Himeji, Japan
- Hirson, France
- Manoppello, Italy
- Saint-Junien, France
- Schramberg, Germany
- Sélestat, France
- Uşak, Turkey
- Waldkirch, Germany

Châtelet

- Casteltermini, Italy
- Vimoutiers, France

Chaudfontaine

- St. Martinville, United States

Chièvres

- Ellon, Scotland, United Kingdom
- Gołuchów, Poland
- Provins, France

Chimay

- Conflans-Sainte-Honorine, France
- Ramsgate, England, United Kingdom

Chiny

- Connaux, France
- Saint-Vérand, France

Comines-Warneton

- Argentonnay, France
- Wolverton, England, United Kingdom

Courcelles

- Abondance, France
- Artogne, Italy
- Guémené-Penfao, France
- Kęty, Poland

== D ==
De Panne

- Bray-Dunes, France
- Hlohovec, Slovakia

Deinze

- Rheinbach, Germany

Denderleeuw

- Rupea, Romania

Dendermonde

- Geldrop-Mierlo, Netherlands

Diest

- Breda, Netherlands
- Dillenburg, Germany
- Orange, France

Diksmuide

- Ellesmere, England, United Kingdom
- Finnentrop, Germany
- Ploemeur, France
- Rottach-Egern, Germany

Dilbeek

- Dalton, United States
- Franschhoek, South Africa
- Obervellach, Austria

Dinant

- Chios, Greece
- Dinan, France

Dison

- Audincourt, France
- Câmpulung, Romania
- Jalapa, Nicaragua

Donceel

- Montecalvo Irpino, Italy

Durbuy

- Hanyū, Japan
- Kościelisko, Poland
- Nieuwpoort, Belgium
- Orimattila, Finland
- Östhammar, Sweden
- Tvrdošín, Slovakia
- Valga, Estonia
- Valka, Latvia

== E ==
Écaussinnes

- Pietrasanta, Italy

Edegem

- San Jerónimo, Peru

Eeklo

- Bagnols-sur-Cèze, France
- Braunfels, Germany
- Carcaixent, Spain
- Feltre, Italy
- Newbury, England, United Kingdom

Esneux

- Châtillon-sur-Seine, France
- Ratzeburg, Germany
- Sława, Poland
- Walcourt, Belgium

Essen

- Essen, Germany
- Hradištko, Czech Republic
- Witzenberg, South Africa
- Žilina, Slovakia

Étalle

- Clérieux, France

Etterbeek

- Fontenay-sous-Bois, France
- Forte dei Marmi, Italy
- Siemiatycze, Poland

Evergem

- Großenkneten, Germany

== F ==
Faimes

- Ambierle, France

Fléron

- Jennings, United States
- Kłodzko, Poland

Fleurus

- Couëron, France
- (Republic of Ireland) Wexford, Ireland

Flobecq

- Cairanne, France
- Žďár nad Sázavou, Czech Republic

Floreffe

- Frégimont, France
- Prata di Pordenone, Italy

Frameries

- La Chaux-de-Fonds, Switzerland
- Issy-les-Moulineaux, France
- Tazerka, Tunisia

Frasnes-lez-Anvaing

- Boskovice, Czech Republic
- Monts, France

Froidchapelle

- Vathiménil, France

== G ==
Ganshoren

- Rusatira, Rwanda

Geel

- (Republic of Ireland) Monaghan, Ireland
- (Republic of Ireland) Tydavnet, Ireland
- Xanten, Germany

Geer

- Aubiet, France

Gembloux

- Aller, Spain
- Épinal, France
- Loughborough, England, United Kingdom
- Skyros, Greece

Genappe

- Littlethorpe, England, United Kingdom
- Narborough, England, United Kingdom

Genk

- Cieszyn, Poland
- Francistown, Botswana
- Nieuwpoort, Belgium
- Troisdorf, Germany

Ghent

- Kanazawa, Japan
- Melle, Germany
- Mohammedia, Morocco
- Nottingham, England, United Kingdom
- Tallinn, Estonia
- Wiesbaden, Germany

Gistel

- Büdingen, Germany

Glabbeek

- Bunești, Romania
- Middelkerke, Belgium
- Verzenay, France

Gouvy

- Suze-la-Rousse, France

Grimbergen

- Bayenghem-lès-Éperlecques, France
- Saalfelden am Steinernen Meer, Austria

== H ==
Halen

- Pasewalk, Germany

Halle

- Kadaň, Czech Republic
- Mouvaux, France
- Werl, Germany

Hamoir

- Saulxures-sur-Moselotte, France
- Wenigumstadt (Großostheim), Germany

Hamont-Achel

- Strausberg, Germany

Hannut

- Thouars, France

Harelbeke

- Aire-sur-la-Lys, France
- Eenhana, Namibia
- Frýdek-Místek, Czech Republic
- Kinheim, Germany

Hasselt

- Detmold, Germany
- Itami, Japan
- Mountain View, United States

Heist-op-den-Berg

- Arad, Romania
- Bergrivier, South Africa
- Ercolano, Italy

Herent

- Klenčí pod Čerchovem, Czech Republic

Herentals

- IJsselstein, Netherlands

Herk-de-Stad

- Oborniki, Poland

Herstal

- Castelmauro, Italy
- Kilmarnock, Scotland, United Kingdom
- Mieres, Spain

Heusden-Zolder

- Brilon, Germany
- Hesdin, France

Hoeilaart

- Valtournenche, Italy

Hooglede

- Schnelldorf, Germany

Hotton

- Bergholtz, France
- Bourdon, France
- Bunkie, United States
- Idanha-a-Nova, Portugal
- Izegem, Belgium
- Xichang, China

Houffalize is a member of the Douzelage, a town twinning association of towns across the European Union. Houffalize also has two other twin towns.

Douzelage

- Agros, Cyprus
- Altea, Spain
- Asikkala, Finland
- Bad Kötzting, Germany
- Bellagio, Italy
- (Republic of Ireland) Bundoran, Ireland
- Chojna, Poland
- Granville, France
- Holstebro, Denmark
- Judenburg, Austria
- Kőszeg, Hungary
- Marsaskala, Malta
- Meerssen, Netherlands
- Niederanven, Luxembourg
- Oxelösund, Sweden
- Preveza, Greece
- Rokiškis, Lithuania
- Rovinj, Croatia
- Sesimbra, Portugal
- Sherborne, England, United Kingdom
- Sigulda, Latvia
- Siret, Romania
- Škofja Loka, Slovenia
- Sušice, Czech Republic
- Tryavna, Bulgaria
- Türi, Estonia
- Zvolen, Slovakia

Other

- Hillesheim, Germany
- Saint-Pair-sur-Mer, France

Houthulst

- Clerques, France

Houyet

- Rasteau, France

Huy

- Arona, Italy
- Compiègne, France
- Natitingou, Benin
- Tienen, Belgium
- Vélingara, Senegal
- Vianden, Luxembourg

== I ==
Ichtegem

- Wassen, Switzerland

Ittre

- Écueillé, France

Ixelles

- Biarritz, France
- Kalamu, Democratic Republic of the Congo
- Megiddo, Israel
- Zababdeh, Palestine

Izegem

- Bad Zwischenahn, Germany
- Bailleul, France
- Hilders, Germany
- Hotton, Belgium
- Zlín, Czech Republic

== J ==
Jalhay

- Nolay, France

Jemeppe-sur-Sambre

- Bagira, Democratic Republic of the Congo

== K ==
Kalmthout

- Štěchovice, Czech Republic

Kasterlee

- Murgești (Acățari), Romania
- Plaffeien, Switzerland

Kluisbergen

- Guînes, France

Koekelberg

- Hyères, France
- Kołobrzeg, Poland
- Sanlúcar de Barrameda, Spain

Koksijde

- Bad Schallerbach, Austria
- Biedenkopf, Germany
- La Charité-sur-Loire, France
- Konz, Germany
- Marowijne, Suriname
- Neustadt an der Orla, Germany

Kortenberg

- Parcé, France

Kortrijk

- Bad Godesberg (Bonn), Germany
- Greenville, United States
- Frascati, Italy
- Saint-Cloud, France
- Windsor and Maidenhead, England, United Kingdom

Kraainem

- Cyanika, Rwanda
- Saint-Trojan-les-Bains, France

Kuurne

- Chiuza, Romania
- Kuressaare (Saaremaa), Estonia
- Marcq-en-Barœul, France

== L ==
Laakdal

- Jurbarkas, Lithuania
- Tönisvorst, Germany

Laarne

- Fényeslitke, Hungary
- Gagnières, France

Ledegem

- Forrières (Nassogne), Belgium
- Mariazell (Eschbronn), Germany
- Warburg, Germany

Lens

- Saint-Donat-sur-l'Herbasse, France

Leuven

- Cristian, Romania
- 's-Hertogenbosch, Netherlands
- Kraków, Poland
- Lüdenscheid, Germany
- Rennes, France

Leuze-en-Hainaut

- Carencro, United States
- Loudun, France
- Ouagadougou, Burkina Faso
- Saint-André-et-Appelles, France
- Sainte-Opportune-la-Mare, France

Lichtervelde

- Région d'Audruicq, France

Liedekerke

- Steinfurt, Germany

Liège

- Cologne, Germany
- Elbasan, Albania
- Esch-sur-Alzette, Luxembourg
- Fuzhou, China
- Lille, France
- Lubumbashi, Democratic Republic of the Congo
- Nancy, France
- Plzeň, Czech Republic
- Porto, Portugal
- Ramallah, Palestine
- Rotterdam, Netherlands
- Saint-Louis, Senegal
- Samarkand, Uzbekistan
- Szeged, Hungary
- Tangier, Morocco
- Turin, Italy

Linkebeek

- Kenton, England, United Kingdom
- Val-du-Layon, France

Lint

- Lith (Oss), Netherlands

Lommel

- Ciudad Darío, Nicaragua

Londerzeel

- Gladenbach, Germany

La Louvière

- Aragona, Italy
- Bojnice, Slovakia
- Foligno, Italy
- Giresun, Turkey
- Kalisz, Poland
- Saint-Maur-des-Fossés, France

Lubbeek

- Lalín, Spain
- Lalinde, France
- Linden, Germany
- Linden (Cuijk), Netherlands
- Sankt Georgen am Walde, Austria

== M ==
Maarkedal

- Horšovský Týn, Czech Republic

Maasmechelen

- Škofja Loka, Slovenia
- Triandria, Greece

Maldegem

- Adria, Italy
- Ermont, France
- Lampertheim, Germany
- Świdnica (rural gmina), Poland

Malle

- Hartley Wintney, England, United Kingdom
- Heusenstamm, Germany
- Saint-Savin, France
- Zakrzówek, Poland

Malmedy

- Beaune, France

Manage

- Bevagna, Italy
- Landrecies, France
- Saint-Laurent-Médoc, France

Mechelen

- Chengdu, China
- Dijon, France
- Helmond, Netherlands
- Lviv, Ukraine

Melle

- Melle, France
- Melle, Germany

Meix-devant-Virton

- Guérigny, France

Menen

- Halluin, France

Merksplas

- Delligsen, Germany
- Hatfield, England, United Kingdom
- Grodzisk Wielkopolski, Poland

Mettet

- Fonyód, Hungary

Middelkerke

- Büchenbeuren, Germany
- Clevedon, England, United Kingdom
- Épernay, France
- Ettlingen, Germany
- Glabbeek, Belgium
- Rauschenberg, Germany
- Sohren, Germany
- Vresse-sur-Semois, Belgium

Mol

- Karakara, Niger
- Santo Tomás, Nicaragua

Molenbeek-Saint-Jean

- M'Bour, Senegal
- Oujda, Morocco

Momignies

- Anor, France
- Gizałki, Poland
- Monts-sur-Guesnes, France

Mons

- Briare, France
- Changsha, China
- Little Rock, United States
- Sefton, England, United Kingdom
- Thoissey, France
- Vannes, France

Montigny-le-Tilleul

- Cousolre, France
- Montereale Valcellina, Italy
- Vincennes, France

Mont-Saint-Guibert

- Cogny, France

Moorslede

- Cany-Barville, France

Morlanwelz

- Blaj, Romania
- Pleszew, Poland
- Le Quesnoy, France
- Villarosa, Italy

Mouscron

- Beuvry-la-Forêt, France
- Bonnemain, France
- Fécamp, France
- Fontaine-sur-Somme, France
- Rheinfelden, Germany
- Vale of Glamorgan, Wales, United Kingdom

== N ==
Namur

- Bandung, Indonesia
- Bourg-en-Bresse, France
- Cluj-Napoca, Romania
- Huế, Vietnam
- Lafayette, United States
- Pristina, Kosovo
- Qixia (Nanjing), China
- Quebec City, Canada

Nandrin

- Saint-Père-Marc-en-Poulet, France
- Saint-Séverin, France

Nieuwerkerken

- San Casciano in Val di Pesa, Italy

Nieuwpoort

- Durbuy, Belgium
- Genk, Belgium
- Nieuwpoort (Molenwaard), Netherlands
- Rodgau, Germany

Nijlen

- Cotnari, Romania
- Güssing, Austria

Ninove

- Deszk, Hungary

Nivelles

- Saintes, France
- Saint-Just-en-Chaussée, France

== O ==
Olen

- Białogard, Poland

Olne

- Candé-sur-Beuvron, France
- Les Montils, France

Oosterzele

- Oberkirch, Germany

Oostkamp

- Bad Langensalza, Germany
- Bad Nauheim, Germany
- Chaumont, France

Ostend

- (The Gambia) Banjul, Gambia
- Monaco, Monaco
- Ostende, Argentina

Ottignies-Louvain-la-Neuve

- Jassans-Riottier, France
- Tiassalé, Ivory Coast
- Veszprém, Hungary

Oudenaarde

- Arras, France
- Bergen op Zoom, Netherlands
- Buzău, Romania
- Castel Madama, Italy
- Coburg, Germany
- Hastings, England, United Kingdom

Oupeye

- Erquy, France

Overijse

- Bacharach, Germany
- Bruttig-Fankel, Germany
- Lecco, Italy
- Mâcon, France
- Modra, Slovakia

== P ==
Pecq

- Manéglise, France

Péruwelz

- Jaunay-Marigny, France
- Paray-Vieille-Poste, France

Perwez

- Kaysersberg Vignoble, France
- Orbais-l'Abbaye, France

Pittem

- La Meyze, France
- Shawnee, United States

Poperinge

- Frielendorf, Germany
- Hythe, England, United Kingdom
- Rixensart, Belgium
- Wolnzach, Germany
- Žatec, Czech Republic

Puurs-Sint-Amands

- Dębica, Poland

== Q ==
Quaregnon

- Assoro, Italy
- Aÿ-Champagne, France
- Condé-sur-l'Escaut, France

== R ==
Ramillies

- Plourhan, France

Rebecq

- Monghidoro, Italy

Rixensart

- Birstall, England, United Kingdom
- Bradu, Romania
- Poperinge, Belgium
- Ruhondo, Rwanda
- Le Touquet, France
- Winterberg, Germany

Rochefort

- Estaires, France
- Morges, Switzerland

Roeselare

- Dogbo-Tota, Benin

Ronse

- Jablonec nad Nisou, Czech Republic
- Kleve, Germany
- M'saken, Tunisia
- Saint-Valery-sur-Somme, France
- Sandwich, England, United Kingdom

Rotselaar

- Bad Gandersheim, Germany

Ruiselede

- Kraśnik, Poland

== S ==
Saint-Ghislain

- Saint-Lô, France
- Sierakowice, Poland

Saint-Gilles

- Berkane, Morocco
- Likasi, Democratic Republic of the Congo
- Offenbach am Main, Germany

Saint-Josse-ten-Noode

- Eskişehir, Turkey
- Tangier, Morocco
- Verona, Italy

Sambreville

- Gessopalena, Italy
- Nuits-Saint-Georges, France
- Pont-Sainte-Maxence, France
- San Pietro al Natisone, Italy

Sankt Vith

- Kerpen, Germany
- Teiuș, Romania

Schaerbeek

- Beyoğlu, Turkey

Schoten

- Tarnów, Poland

Seraing

- Châtel, France
- Douai, France
- Rimini, Italy

Silly

- San Miniato, Italy
- Saline, France

Sint-Genesius-Rode

- Nordmaling, Sweden

Sint-Gillis-Waas

- Águeda, Portugal

Sint-Katelijne-Waver

- Iernut, Romania

Sint-Niklaas

- Abingdon-on-Thames, England, United Kingdom
- Colmar, France
- Gorinchem, Netherlands
- Al Hoceima, Morocco
- Lucca, Italy
- Schongau, Germany
- Tambacounda, Senegal

Sint-Pieters-Leeuw

- Altenahr, Germany

Sint-Truiden

- Duras, France
- Nueva Guinea, Nicaragua

Soignies

- Hazebrouck, France

Spa

- Cabourg, France
- Eguisheim, France
- La Garde, France

Spiere-Helkijn

- Peyrusse-le-Roc, France

Staden

- Florstadt, Germany

Stavelot

- Pommard, France
- Solignac, France

== T ==
Theux

- Bierstadt (Wiesbaden), Germany
- Terrasson-Lavilledieu, France

Tielt

- Brignoles, France
- Bruneck, Italy
- Groß-Gerau, Germany
- Szamotuły, Poland

Tienen

- Hergiswil, Switzerland
- Huy, Belgium
- Valkenswaard, Netherlands

Tinlot

- Diarville, France
- Tantonville, France

Tournai

- Bethlehem, Palestine
- Mogi das Cruzes, Brazil
- Shumen, Bulgaria
- Tarija, Bolivia
- Troyes, France
- Villeneuve-d'Ascq, France

Tubize

- Korntal-Münchingen, Germany
- Mirande, France
- Scandiano, Italy

Turnhout

- Hammelburg, Germany
- Hanzhong, China
- Gödöllő, Hungary
- Vânători (Mișca), Romania

== U ==
Uccle

- Neuilly-sur-Seine, France

== V ==
Vaux-sur-Sûre

- Crowley, United States
- Vaux, France

Verviers

- Arles, France
- Bradford, England, United Kingdom
- Mönchengladbach, Germany
- La Motte-Chalancon, France
- Roubaix, France

Veurne

- Rösrath, Germany

Vielsalm

- Bruyères, France
- Zonnebeke, Belgium

Vilvoorde

- Ennepetal, Germany
- Komatsu, Japan
- Maubeuge, France
- Middelburg, Netherlands
- Peñarroya-Pueblonuevo, Spain

Visé

- Honfleur, France

== W ==
Waasmunster

- Braloștița, Romania
- Kranjska Gora, Slovenia

Walcourt

- Châtillon-sur-Seine, France
- Esneux, Belgium
- Ratzeburg, Germany

Waregem

- Szekszárd, Hungary

Waremme

- Gallinaro, Italy
- Gérardmer, France
- Skopje, North Macedonia

Waterloo

- Nagakute, Japan
- Rambouillet, France

Watermael-Boitsfort

- Annan, Scotland, United Kingdom
- Chantilly, France
- Hegyvidék (Budapest), Hungary

Westerlo

- Oirschot, Netherlands
- Ottersweier, Germany
- Westerlo, United States

Wetteren

- Brakel, Germany

Wevelgem

- Ennevelin, France

Woluwe-Saint-Lambert

- Meudon, France

Woluwe-Saint-Pierre

- Chaoyang (Beijing), China
- Gangnam (Seoul), South Korea
- Goma, Democratic Republic of the Congo
- New Iberia, United States
- Pecica, Romania
- Ruyumba, Rwanda

== Y ==
Ypres

- Lehrte, Germany
- Saint-Omer, France
- Seelbach, Germany
- Siegen, Germany

Yvoir

- Boulazac-Isle-Manoire, France
- Finspång, Sweden
- Givet, France
- Stromberg, Germany
- Vitteaux, France

== Z ==
Zandhoven

- Alheim, Germany

Zaventem

- Blankenheim, Germany

Zedelgem

- Reil, Germany

Zele

- Cham, Germany

Zelzate

- Aubenas, France
- Cesenatico, Italy
- Schwarzenbek, Germany
- Sierre, Switzerland

Zemst

- Sokone, Senegal
- Spermezeu, Romania

Zoersel

- Crucea, Romania
- Laubach, Germany
- Lora del Río, Spain

Zonhoven

- Gayndah (North Burnett), Australia

Zonnebeke

- Éperlecques, France
- Marrickville (Inner West), Australia
- Vielsalm, Belgium
- Waimakariri, New Zealand
- Wicko, Poland

Zottegem

- Mödling, Austria

Zulte

- Halluin, France

Zwalm

- Schwalmstadt, Germany

Zwevegem

- Le Coteau, France
- Lorsch, Germany

Zwijndrecht

- Idstein, Germany
