= Schipanski =

Schipanski is a German surname of Slavic origin. Notable people with the surname include:

- Dagmar Schipanski (1943–2022), German physicist, academic, and politician
- Tankred Schipanski (born 1976), German politician
