= International Student Week in Ilmenau =

Biennial student conference in Ilmenau, Germany

Coordinates: 50°40′53″N 10°55′59″E

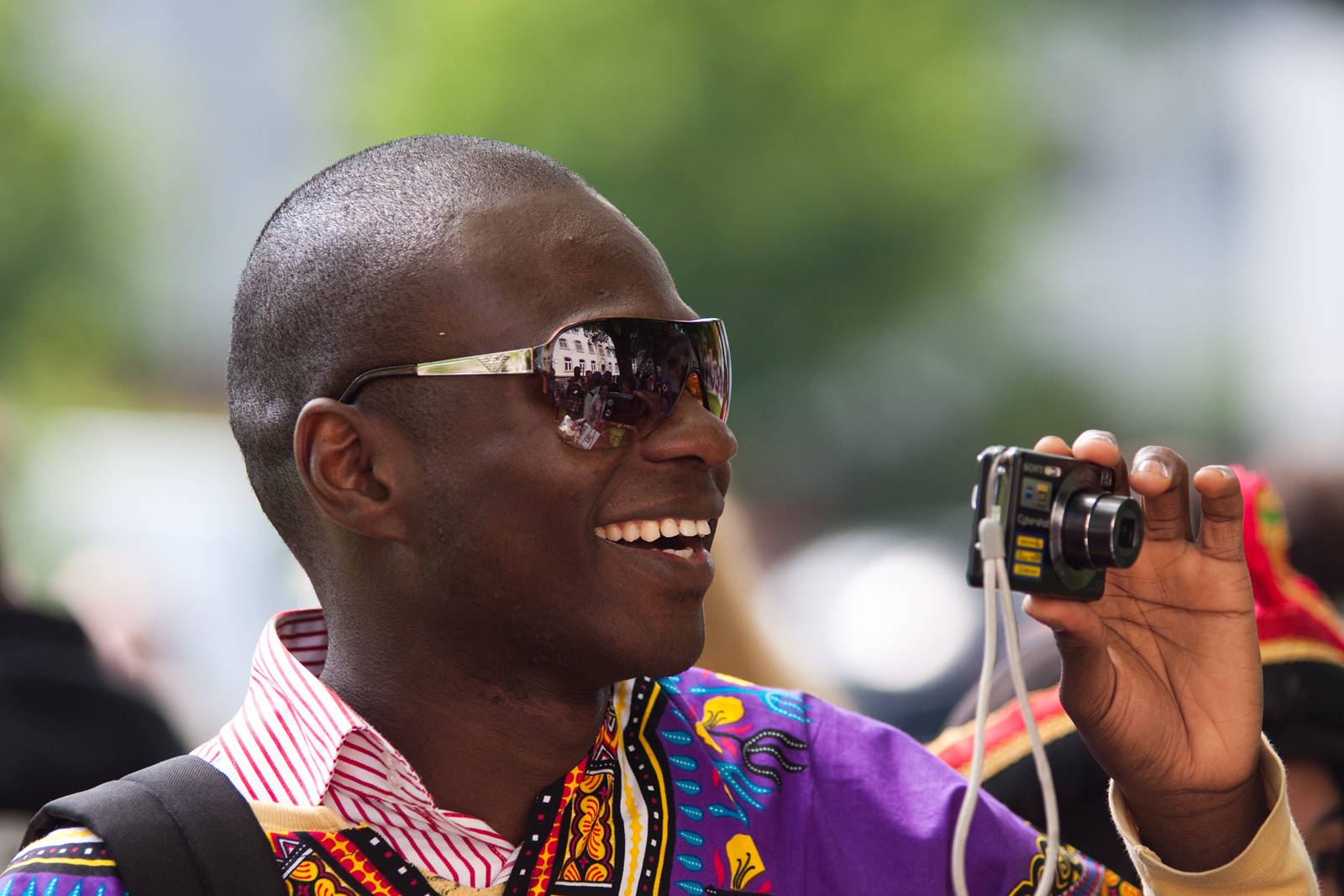
A man taking a photo at ISWI 2009

International Student Week in Ilmenau is a student conference, held biennially in the town of Ilmenau, located in the district of Ilm-Kreis, Thuringia, Germany.

The conference welcomes participants from all parts of the world. The first ISWI was held in 1993. At the conference participants discuss topics and experience a broad cultural exchange. Around 400 participants from over 80 countries took part in ISWI 2015. The week includes big-ticket lectures by distinguished personalities, the most well-known speakers are until this day Robert Jungk, Joseph Weizenbaum, Helmut Schmidt and Konrad Zuse.

Each conference offers a wide range of cultural events, such as concerts, food festival, theme-based events and so on. These events mostly organized in collaboration various organisations based around the Ilmenau University of Technology. The news coverage is done by the college radio station Radio hsf, which broadcasts 24/10 during the conference.

ISWI also stands for the name of the organizing organization, 'Initiative Solidarische Welt Ilmenau' e.V. or ‘Initiative for World Solidarity Ilmenau’ which is a non-governmental non-profit organization which aims to: "be an initiative for a more peaceful world - to promote mutual understanding and respect". ISWI e.V is the primary organiser of the International Student Week in Ilmenau.

ISWI e.V is an active member of a network of student-organised conferences, 'Students ORganising Conferences Everywhere' SOrCE.

== List of events ==
	Motto	Patron	Number of participants
May 6 – 22, 1993	„Become friends - unite the world“	Hans-Dietrich Genscher	290
May 28 – June 5, 1995	„Get up and live–now“	Bernhard Vogel	250
May 3 – 10, 1997	„Let's build our future“	Dagmar Schipanski	420
May 8 – 16, 1999	„Celebrating Diversity“	Federico Mayor	350
May 18 – 27, 2001	„Just Future“	Edelgard Bulmahn	320
May 9 – 18, 2003	„Because the people matter“	Boutros Boutros-Ghali	300
May 20 – 29, 2005	„one world - one vision“	Jody Williams	334
June 1 – 10, 2007	„time to think“	Gesine Schwan	354
May 8 – 17, 2009	„Right now!“	Hina Jilani	370
May 13 – 22, 2011	„crossing borders“	Stéphane Hessel	370
May 31 – June 9, 2013	„moving YOUth“	José Antonio Abreu, Vandana Shiva	384
May 29 – June 7, 2015	„dare to care“	Jakob von Uexkull	382
May 12 – 21, 2017	„Global Justice - A Fair(y) Tale?“	Kumi Naidoo	341
May 17 – 26, 2019	„Changes and Choices - Good by(e) Tradition?“	Waris Dirie, Rob Hopkins	336
May 28 – June 6, 2021	"Our Future, Our Responsibility – There is no Plan(et) B!"		200
June 2 – 11, 2023	"Impact of Knowledge: With Great Knowledge Comes Great Responsibility"		

== Initiative Solidarische Welt Ilmenau e.V. ==
ISWI e.V.
- Initiative Solidarische Welt Ilmenau e. V.
- Formation: 1992-12-07
- Purpose: Peacebuilding, international understanding, and tolerance
- Location: Ilmenau, Germany
- Members: 40 active, 20 MoP, 127 dormant, 11 Supporting members
- Board of directors: Sofia Mikhailova (1. Board Member), Amirmohammad Alidaust Moazezi Lahijan (2. Board Member), Niklas Loos (Finance Person)
- Website: iswi.org

The Initiative Solidarische Welt Ilmenau e.V. (ISWI) is, according to its own statement, "committed to peace, international understanding as well as international solidarity and tolerance" and is a member of the SOrCE network (Students Organising Conventions Everywhere).

In addition to the main project - the International Students Week in Ilmenau (ISWI) - their activities range from organizing lectures on political education and readings to conducting international work camps and enriching campus life - be it the Kitchen Run or Professors Reading Christmas Stories.

These projects include:

- Ilmenau Dialogue Center
- Refugee Network
- Fernweh series (Intercultural evenings, Wanderlust lectures, Radio International)
- Professors reading Christmas stories
- Colorful Christmas
- Intercultural Dancing (Salsa and Bachata)
- Language Meeting (German, Spanish, Japanese, Persian)
- Kitchen Run
- Give-and-take festival
- Give-and-take shelf
