= List of presidents of the Landtag of Thuringia =

The following is a list of presidents of the Landtag of Thuringia.

Name	Period	Party
Artur Drechsler	1920–1921	USPD
Hermann Leber	1921–1923	SDP
Erich Wernick	1924–1927	ThLB
Ernst von Thümmel	1927–1932	ThLB
Willy Marschler	1932	NSDAP
Fritz Hille	1932–1933	NSDAP

== President of the Beratende Landesversammlung ==
Name	Period	Party
Richard Lange	1946	Non-partisan

== Presidents of the Landtag of Thuringia ==
Name	Period	Party
August Fröhlich	21 November 1946 – July 1952	SED
Gottfried Müller	1990–1994	CDU
Frank-Michael Pietzsch	1994–1999	CDU
Christine Lieberknecht	1999–2004	CDU
Dagmar Schipanski	2004–2009	CDU
Birgit Diezel	2009–2019	CDU
Birgit Pommer	2019–2024	The Left
Thadäus König	2024–Incumbent	CDU
