= Sättelstädt =

- Ortsteil of Hörselberg-Hainich
- Interactive map of Sättelstädt
- Location within Germany Location within Thuringia
- Coordinates: 50°56′37″N 10°28′48″E
- Country: Germany
- State: Thuringia
- District: Wartburgkreis
- Municipality: Hörselberg-Hainich
- Elevation: 263 m (863 ft)

Population (2021-12-31)
  - Total: 580
- Time zone: UTC+01:00 (CET)
  - Summer (DST): UTC+02:00 (CEST)
- Postal codes: 99820
- Dialling codes: 03622

Sättelstädt (lit. Saddletown) is a village and a former municipality in the Wartburg district, Thuringia, Germany. In 1996 it was merged into municipality of Hörselberg, which became part of Hörselberg-Hainich in 2007. It is one of the 17 Ortsteile (subdivisions) of Hörselberg-Hainich. Its population is 580 (2021).
