= Gera II =

Electoral constituency in Thuringia, Germany

Gera II is an electoral constituency (German: Wahlkreis) represented in the Landtag of Thuringia. It elects one member via first-past-the-post voting. Under the current constituency numbering system, it is designated as constituency 42. It covers the southern part of Gera.

Gera II was created in 1990 for the first state election. Originally named Gera-Süd, it was renamed in 1994. Since 2019, it has been represented by Wolfgang Lauerwald of Alternative for Germany (AfD).

== Geography ==
As of the 2019 state election, Gera II covers the southern part of Gera, specifically the city districts (Ortsteile) of Alt-Taubenpreskeln, Dürrenebersdorf, Falka, Gera, Kaimberg, Langengrobsdorf, Lietzsch, Naulitz, Poris-Lengefeld, Thränitz, Weißig, Zeulsdorf, and Zschippern.

== Members ==
The constituency was held by the Christian Democratic Union (CDU) from its creation in 1990 until 2004, during which time it was represented by Matthias Ritter (1990–1994) and Birgit Diezel (1994–2004). In 2004, it was won by Dieter Hausold of the Party of Democratic Socialism (PDS). He was re-elected as candidate for The Left in 2009 and 2014. The constituency was won by Alternative for Germany in 2019, represented by Wolfgang Lauerwald, and was held in 2024.

Election	Member	Party	%
1990	Matthias Ritter	CDU	36.4
1994	Birgit Diezel	CDU	35.2
1999	Birgit Diezel	CDU	39.7
2004	Dieter Hausold	PDS	41.0
2009	Dieter Hausold	LINKE	39.6
2014	Dieter Hausold	LINKE	41.2
2019	Wolfgang Lauerwald	AfD	32.9
2024	Wolfgang Lauerwald	AfD	43.6

== Election results ==
=== 2024 election ===
State election (2024): Gera II
Notes:	Blue background denotes the winner of the electorate vote. Pink background denotes a candidate elected from their party list. Yellow background denotes an electorate win by a list member, or other incumbent. A ✓ or ✗ denotes status of any incumbent, win or lose respectively.						
Party	Candidate	Votes	%	±%	Party votes	%	±%
AfD	✓ Wolfgang Lauerwald	9,700	43.6	▲10.7	8,267	36.7	▲6.8
CDU	Christian Klein	6,400	28.8	▲13.9	4,649	20.6	▲5.9
BSW					3,902	17.3	
Left	Andreas Schubert	4,462	20.1	▼8.9	3,193	14.2	▼20.2
SPD	Christian Peter Urban	1,336	6.0	▼9.3	969	4.3	▼3.6
Greens	David Doering	347	1.6	▼1.9	358	1.6	▼1.7
APT					263	1.2	▼0.1
Values					253	1.1	
FDP					216	1.0	▼3.2
FW					116	0.5	
BD					112	0.5	
Familie					97	0.4	
Pirates					61	0.3	Steady
ÖDP					44	0.2	▼0.1
MLPD					39	0.2	▼0.1
Informal votes		487			193		
Total valid votes		22,245			22,539		
Turnout		22,732	66.9	▲6.1			
AfD hold	Majority	3,300	14.8	▲10.9			

=== 2019 election ===
State election (2019): Gera II
Notes:	Blue background denotes the winner of the electorate vote. Pink background denotes a candidate elected from their party list. Yellow background denotes an electorate win by a list member, or other incumbent. A ✓ or ✗ denotes status of any incumbent, win or lose respectively.						
Party	Candidate	Votes	%	±%	Party votes	%	±%
AfD	Wolfgang Lauerwald	7,170	32.9		6,524	29.9	▲16.3
Left	Andreas Schubert	6,314	29.0	▼12.2	7,504	34.4	▼2.5
SPD	Wolfgang Tiefensee	3,329	15.3	▲4.2	1,724	7.9	▼2.2
CDU	Christian Klein	3,239	14.9	▼17.3	3,212	14.7	▼13.3
FDP	Rüdiger Hannig	854	3.9		924	4.2	▲2.4
Greens	Laura Wahl (Note: Wahl entered the Landtag on the Greens list after the resignation of Anja Siegesmund in March 2020.)	754	3.5	▼1.3	719	3.3	▼0.7
MLPD	Dagmar Kolkmann-Lutz	110	0.5		64	0.3	
List-only parties					1,164	5.3	
Informal votes		308			243		
Total valid votes		21,770			21,835		
Turnout		22,078	60.8	▲14.5			
AfD gain from Left	Majority	856	3.9				

=== 2014 election ===
State election (2014): Gera II
Notes:	Blue background denotes the winner of the electorate vote. Pink background denotes a candidate elected from their party list. Yellow background denotes an electorate win by a list member, or other incumbent. A ✓ or ✗ denotes status of any incumbent, win or lose respectively.						
Party	Candidate	Votes	%	±%	Party votes	%	±%
Left	✓ Dieter Hausold	7,106	41.2	▲1.6	6,450	36.9	▼0.3
CDU	Christian Klein	5,564	32.2	▲6.6	4,890	28.0	▲1.1
AfD					2,373	13.6	
SPD	Claudia Scheerschmidt (Note: Scheerschmidt entered the Landtag on the SPD list after the resignation of Christoph Matschie in October 2017.)	1,908	11.1	▼3.4	1,766	10.1	▼6.2
Free Voters	Günter Brinkmann	1,025	5.9		266	1.5	▼0.3
NPD	Peter Pichl	829	4.8	0.0	455	2.6	▼1.7
Greens	Regina Pfeiler	822	4.8	▼1.6	692	4.0	▼1.0
List-only parties					603	3.4	
Informal votes		499			258		
Total valid votes		17,254			17,495		
Turnout		17,753	46.3	▼5.9			
Left hold	Majority	1,542	9.0	▼5.0			

=== 2009 election ===
State election (2009): Gera II
Notes:	Blue background denotes the winner of the electorate vote. Pink background denotes a candidate elected from their party list. Yellow background denotes an electorate win by a list member, or other incumbent. A ✓ or ✗ denotes status of any incumbent, win or lose respectively.						
Party	Candidate	Votes	%	±%	Party votes	%	±%
Left	✓ Dieter Hausold	8,118	39.6	▼1.4	7,661	37.2	▲1.2
CDU	Ralf Bornkessel	5,245	25.6	▼10.2	5,524	26.9	▼7.7
SPD	Wolfgang Lemb	2,968	14.5	▲1.0	3,356	16.3	▲2.6
FDP	Dieter Falk	1,866	9.1	▲4.1	1,607	7.8	▲4.4
Greens	Ingo Menke	1,312	6.4	▲1.7	1,034	5.0	▲1.2
NPD	André Berghold	985	4.8		887	4.3	▲2.7
List-only parties					498	2.4	
Informal votes		448			375		
Total valid votes		20,494			20,567		
Turnout		20,942	52.2	▲4.9			
Left hold	Majority	2,873	14.0	▲8.8			

=== 2004 election ===
State election (2004): Gera II
Notes:	Blue background denotes the winner of the electorate vote. Pink background denotes a candidate elected from their party list. Yellow background denotes an electorate win by a list member, or other incumbent. A ✓ or ✗ denotes status of any incumbent, win or lose respectively.						
Party	Candidate	Votes	%	±%	Party votes	%	±%
PDS	Dieter Hausold	7,757	41.0	▲7.1	6,896	36.0	▲3.3
CDU	✗ Birgit Diezel	6,767	35.8	▼3.9	6,628	34.6	▼6.6
SPD	René Jung	2,558	13.5	▼8.5	2,630	13.7	▼4.3
FDP	Cornelia Schmidt	950	5.0	▲3.4	651	3.4	▲2.6
Greens	Christel Wagner-Schurwanz	883	4.7		729	3.8	▲2.3
List-only parties					1,605	8.4	
Informal votes		951			727		
Total valid votes		18,915			19,139		
Turnout		19,866	47.3	▼7.6			
PDS gain from CDU	Majority	990	5.2				

=== 1999 election ===
State election (1999): Gera II
Notes:	Blue background denotes the winner of the electorate vote. Pink background denotes a candidate elected from their party list. Yellow background denotes an electorate win by a list member, or other incumbent. A ✓ or ✗ denotes status of any incumbent, win or lose respectively.						
Party	Candidate	Votes	%	±%	Party votes	%	±%
CDU	✓ Birgit Diezel	9,863	39.7	▲4.5	10,264	41.2	▲6.0
PDS		8,436	33.9	▲6.0	8,154	32.7	▲5.7
SPD		5,479	22.0	▼6.0	4,474	17.9	▼8.6
REP		679	2.7	▲1.2	173	0.7	▼0.5
FDP		404	1.6		202	0.8	▼1.8
List-only parties					1,658	6.7	
Informal votes		350			286		
Total valid votes		24,861			24,925		
Turnout		25,211	54.9	▼16.7			
CDU hold	Majority	1,427	5.8	▼1.4			

=== 1994 election ===
State election (1994): Gera II
Notes:	Blue background denotes the winner of the electorate vote. Pink background denotes a candidate elected from their party list. Yellow background denotes an electorate win by a list member, or other incumbent. A ✓ or ✗ denotes status of any incumbent, win or lose respectively.						
Party	Candidate	Votes	%	±%	Party votes	%	±%
CDU	Birgit Diezel	11,999	35.2	▼1.2	12,078	35.2	▲0.5
SPD		9,542	28.0	▲4.6	9,084	26.5	▲2.0
PDS		9,502	27.9	▲11.6	9,259	27.0	▲9.8
Greens		2,239	6.6	▼1.3	1,584	4.6	▼2.8
REP		521	1.5		428	1.2	
DSU		314	0.9	▼3.8	145	0.4	▼3.7
List-only parties					1,724	5.0	
Informal votes		792			607		
Total valid votes		34,117			34,302		
Turnout		34,909	71.6	▲5.5			
CDU hold	Majority	2,457	7.2	▼5.8			

=== 1990 election ===
State election (1990): Gera II
Notes:	Blue background denotes the winner of the electorate vote. Pink background denotes a candidate elected from their party list. Yellow background denotes an electorate win by a list member, or other incumbent. A ✓ or ✗ denotes status of any incumbent, win or lose respectively.						
Party	Candidate	Votes	%	±%	Party votes	%	±%
CDU	Matthias Ritter	11,547	36.4		11,053	34.7	
SPD		7,430	23.4		7,785	24.5	
PDS		5,167	16.3		5,463	17.2	
FDP		2,770	8.7		2,882	9.1	
Greens		2,495	7.9		2,343	7.4	
DSU		1,492	4.7		1,298	4.1	
DFD		383	1.2		262	0.8	
UFV		300	0.9		225	0.7	
DBU		136	0.4		99	0.3	
List-only parties					400	1.3	
Informal votes		899			809		
Total valid votes		31,720			31,810		
Turnout		32,619	66.1				
CDU win new seat	Majority	4,117	13.0				
