= Beringen =

Beringen may mean:

- Beringen, Belgium, a municipality located in the Belgian province of Limburg.
- Beringen, Switzerland, a municipality in the canton of Schaffhausen in Switzerland.
- Beringen, Luxembourg, a small town in the commune of Mersch.
