= Gotha – Ilm-Kreis =

Federal electoral district of Germany

191 Gotha – Ilm-Kreis
- Electoral district for the Bundestag
- Gotha – Ilm-Kreis in 2025
- State: Thuringia
- Population: 241,200 (2019)
- Electorate: 190,519 (2021)
- Major settlements: Gotha; Ilmenau; Arnstadt
- Area: 1,741.2 km^{2}

Current electoral district
- Created: 1990
- Party: AfD
- Member: Marcus Bühl
- Elected: 2021, 2025

Gotha – Ilm-Kreis is an electoral constituency (German: Wahlkreis) represented in the Bundestag. It elects one member via first-past-the-post voting. Under the current constituency numbering system, it is designated as constituency 191. It is located in west-central Thuringia, comprising the districts of Gotha and Ilm-Kreis.

Gotha – Ilm-Kreis was created for the inaugural 1990 federal election after German reunification. Since 2021, it has been represented by Marcus Bühl of the Alternative for Germany (AfD).

== Geography ==
Gotha – Ilm-Kreis is located in west-central Thuringia. As of the 2021 federal election, it comprises the districts of Gotha and Ilm-Kreis.

== History ==
Gotha – Ilm-Kreis was created after German reunification in 1990, then known as Gotha – Arnstadt. It acquired its current name in the 2002 election. In the 1990 through 1998 elections, it was constituency 299 in the numbering system. In the 2002 and 2005 elections, it was number 193. In the 2009 through 2021 elections, it was number 192. From the 2025 election, it has been number 191.

Originally, the constituency comprised the districts of Gotha and Arnstadt. It acquired its current borders in the 2002 election.

Election	No.	Name	Borders
1990	299	Gotha – Arnstadt	Gotha district; Arnstadt district
1994	299	Gotha – Arnstadt	Gotha district; Arnstadt district
1998	299	Gotha – Arnstadt	Gotha district; Arnstadt district
2002	193	Gotha – Ilm-Kreis	Gotha district; Ilm-Kreis district
2005	193	Gotha – Ilm-Kreis	Gotha district; Ilm-Kreis district
2009	192	Gotha – Ilm-Kreis	Gotha district; Ilm-Kreis district
2013	192	Gotha – Ilm-Kreis	Gotha district; Ilm-Kreis district
2017	192	Gotha – Ilm-Kreis	Gotha district; Ilm-Kreis district
2021	192	Gotha – Ilm-Kreis	Gotha district; Ilm-Kreis district
2025	191	Gotha – Ilm-Kreis	Gotha district; Ilm-Kreis district

== Members ==
The constituency was first represented by Gerhard Päselt of the Christian Democratic Union (CDU) from 1990 to 1998. Gerhard Neumann won it for the Social Democratic Party (SPD) in 1998 and served a single term. He was succeeded by fellow SPD member Petra Heß from 2002 to 2009. Tankred Schipanski of the CDU was elected in 2009, and re-elected in 2013 and 2017. Marcus Bühl won the constituency for the Alternative for Germany (AfD) in 2021.

Election	Member	Party	%
1990	Gerhard Päselt	CDU	46.7
1994	Gerhard Päselt	CDU	43.1
1998	Gerhard Neumann	SPD	40.1
2002	Petra Heß	SPD	41.8
2005	Petra Heß	SPD	37.2
2009	Tankred Schipanski	CDU	29.1
2013	Tankred Schipanski	CDU	38.3
2017	Tankred Schipanski	CDU	29.0
2021	Marcus Bühl	AfD	26.5
2025	Marcus Bühl	AfD	41.2

== Election results ==
=== 2025 election ===
Federal election (2025): Gotha – Ilm-Kreis
Notes:	Blue background denotes the winner of the electorate vote. Pink background denotes a candidate elected from their party list. Yellow background denotes an electorate win by a list member, or other incumbent. A ✓ or ✗ denotes status of any incumbent, win or lose respectively.						
Party	Candidate	Votes	%	±%	Party votes	%	±%
AfD	✓ Marcus Bühl	60,348	41.2	▲14.7	59,553	40.6	▲14.6
CDU	Tankred Schipanski	29,345	20.0	▲1.6	25,917	17.7	▲2.1
Left	Sascha Bilay	18,753	12.8	▲1.7	21,968	15.0	▲4.0
SPD	Florian Wagner	14,680	10.0	▼13.5	12,958	8.8	▼14.9
BSW	Juliane Hein	11,661	8.0	New	13,584	9.3	New
Greens	Madeleine Henfling	4,402	3.0	▼1.6	5,144	3.5	▼2.3
FW	Mathias Nicolai	3,236	2.2	▼1.8	2,453	1.7	▼1.0
FDP	Martin Mölders	2,999	2.0	▼4.7	3,906	2.7	▼6.0
Independent	Timo Pradel	967	0.7	▲0.3			
Volt					697	0.5	▲0.1
BD					465	0.3	New
Independent	Juliane Hahn	235	0.2	New			
MLPD					465	0.3	0.0
Informal votes		1,359			1,162		
Total valid votes		146,626			146,823		
Turnout		147,985	80.3	▲5.5			
AfD hold	Majority	31,003	21.2	▲18.2			

=== 2021 election ===
Federal election (2021): Gotha – Ilm-Kreis
Notes:	Blue background denotes the winner of the electorate vote. Pink background denotes a candidate elected from their party list. Yellow background denotes an electorate win by a list member, or other incumbent. A ✓ or ✗ denotes status of any incumbent, win or lose respectively.						
Party	Candidate	Votes	%	±%	Party votes	%	±%
AfD	Marcus Bühl	37,249	26.5	▲2.6	36,522	26.0	▲1.9
SPD	Michael Müller	33,085	23.5	▲4.9	33,437	23.8	▲9.8
CDU	✗ Tankred Schipanski	25,918	18.4	▼10.5	21,820	15.5	▼12.3
Left	Cornelia Wanderer	15,579	11.1	▼4.5	15,454	11.0	▼4.7
FDP	Martin Mölders	9,494	6.8	▲0.7	12,126	8.6	▲0.9
Greens	Stephan Ostermann	6,498	4.6	▲1.3	8,100	5.8	▲2.0
FW	Sylke Mönch	5,622	4.0	▲0.4	3,810	2.7	▲0.9
PARTEI	Frank-Peter Prüger	2,783	2.0		1,791	1.3	▼0.5
dieBasis	Sven-Jarno Bien	2,435	1.7		2,351	1.7	
Tierschutzpartei					2,168	1.5	
Graue Panther	André Pfannschmidt	961	0.7				
Pirates					759	0.5	0.0
THP	Timo Pradel	549	0.4				
Volt					468	0.3	
NPD					437	0.3	▼0.9
Menschliche Welt					405	0.3	
Team Todenhöfer					297	0.2	
MLPD	Louisa von Freytag-Löringhoff	411	0.3		235	0.2	0.0
Humanists					173	0.1	
ÖDP					162	0.1	▼0.3
V-Partei3					133	0.1	▼0.1
Informal votes		1,982			1,918		
Total valid votes		140,584			140,648		
Turnout		142,566	74.8	▲0.2			
AfD gain from CDU	Majority	4,164	3.0				

=== 2017 election ===
Federal election (2017): Gotha – Ilm-Kreis
Notes:	Blue background denotes the winner of the electorate vote. Pink background denotes a candidate elected from their party list. Yellow background denotes an electorate win by a list member, or other incumbent. A ✓ or ✗ denotes status of any incumbent, win or lose respectively.						
Party	Candidate	Votes	%	±%	Party votes	%	±%
CDU	✓ Tankred Schipanski	42,221	29.0	▼8.3	40,576	27.8	▼10.4
AfD	Carsten Günther	34,798	23.9	▲18.1	35,091	24.1	▲16.6
SPD	Petra Heß	27,120	18.6	▼6.3	20,391	14.0	▼3.1
Left	Anke Hofmann-Domke	22,674	15.6	▼4.6	22,920	15.7	▼6.4
FDP	Martin Mölders	8,775	6.0	▲4.7	11,218	7.7	▲5.3
FW	Wolfgang Sturm	5,198	3.6	▲2.1	2,691	1.8	▲0.3
Greens	Matthias Schlegel	4,809	3.3	▲0.3	5,411	3.7	▼0.9
PARTEI					2,654	1.8	
NPD					1,824	1.3	▼1.9
DM					829	0.6	
Pirates					733	0.5	▼2.1
ÖDP					541	0.4	▼0.2
BGE					459	0.3	
V-Partei³					347	0.2	
MLPD					193	0.1	0.0
Informal votes		2,470			2,187		
Total valid votes		145,595			145,878		
Turnout		148,065	74.7	▲5.9			
CDU hold	Majority	7,423	5.1	▼7.2			

=== 2013 election ===
Federal election (2013): Gotha – Ilm-Kreis
Notes:	Blue background denotes the winner of the electorate vote. Pink background denotes a candidate elected from their party list. Yellow background denotes an electorate win by a list member, or other incumbent. A ✓ or ✗ denotes status of any incumbent, win or lose respectively.						
Party	Candidate	Votes	%	±%	Party votes	%	±%
CDU	✓ Tankred Schipanski	51,861	37.3	▲8.2	53,196	38.2	▲7.5
SPD	Petra Heß	34,726	25.0	▼1.9	23,815	17.1	▼2.5
Left	Martina Renner	28,015	20.1	▼5.9	30,758	22.1	▼5.6
AfD	Jens Dietrich	8,063	5.8		10,309	7.4	
NPD	Sebastian Reiche	4,689	3.4	▼0.6	4,416	3.2	▼0.4
Greens	Steffen Fuchs	4,117	3.0	▼2.4	6,414	4.6	▼0.9
Pirates	Andreas Kaßbohm	3,656	2.6		3,566	2.6	▼0.3
FW	Annette Garcia	2,067	1.5		2.079	1.5	
FDP	Torsten Köhler-Hohlfeld	1,879	1.4	▼5.9	3,280	2.4	▼6.6
ÖDP					734	0.5	▲0.2
REP					343	0.2	▼0.1
MLPD					182	0.1	0.0
Informal votes		2,388			2,369		
Total valid votes		139,073			139,092		
Turnout		141,461	68.7	▲3.5			
CDU hold	Majority	17,135	12.3	▲10.1			

=== 2009 election ===
Federal election (2009): Gotha – Ilm-Kreis
Notes:	Blue background denotes the winner of the electorate vote. Pink background denotes a candidate elected from their party list. Yellow background denotes an electorate win by a list member, or other incumbent. A ✓ or ✗ denotes status of any incumbent, win or lose respectively.						
Party	Candidate	Votes	%	±%	Party votes	%	±%
CDU	Tankred Schipanski	40,063	29.1	0.0	42,479	30.8	▼4.3
SPD	✗ Petra Heß	37,032	26.9	▼10.3	27,092	19.6	▼11.2
Left	Cornelia Hirsch	35,942	26.1	▲4.7	38,257	27.7	▲3.0
FDP	Anja Kolbe	10,056	7.3	▲2.6	12,393	9.0	▲1.4
Greens	Katrin Göring-Eckardt	7,391	5.4	▲2.8	7,608	5.5	▲1.1
NPD	Sebastian Reiche	5,475	4.0	▼0.4	4,924	3.6	▼0.3
Pirates					3,992	2.9	
Independent	Stephan Beyer	1,176	0.9				
Independent	Silke Möller	672	0.5				
REP					513	0.4	▼0.3
ÖDP					499	0.4	
MLPD					191	0.1	▼0.3
Informal votes		2,112			1,971		
Total valid votes		137,807			137,948		
Turnout		139,919	65.2	▼10.6			
CDU gain from SPD	Majority	3,031	2.2				

=== 2005 election ===
Federal election (2005):Gotha - Ilm-Kreis
Notes:	Blue background denotes the winner of the electorate vote. Pink background denotes a candidate elected from their party list. Yellow background denotes an electorate win by a list member, or other incumbent. A ✓ or ✗ denotes status of any incumbent, win or lose respectively.						
Party	Candidate	Votes	%	±%	Party votes	%	±%
SPD	✓ Petra Heß	60,384	37.2	▼4.6	50,019	30.8	▼9.7
CDU	Claudia Nolte	47,115	29.0	▼1.8	42,966	26.5	▼3.5
Left	Adrian Pietsch	34,761	21.4	▲3.5	40,120	24.7	▲8.5
FDP	Franco Bauer	7,598	4.7	▼1.8	12,399	7.6	▲1.8
NPD	Michael Burkert	7,118	4.4		6,296	3.9	▲3.1
Greens	Astrid Rothe-Beinlich	4,171	2.6	▼0.4	6,296	3.9	▲3.1
GRAUEN					1,645	1.0	▲0.5
REP					1,096	0.7	▼0.1
PBC	Andreas Ebert	1,085	0.7				
MLPD					715	0.4	
Informal votes		3,619			3,425		
Total valid votes		162,232			162,426		
Turnout		165,851	75.8	▲0.4			
SPD hold	Majority	13,269	8.2				
