= Sömmerda II =

Landtag constituency in Thuringia, Germany

Sömmerda II is an electoral constituency (German: Wahlkreis) represented in the Landtag of Thuringia. It elects one member via first-past-the-post voting. Under the current constituency numbering system, it is designated as constituency 17. It covers most of the Sömmerda district, including the city of Sömmerda.

Sömmerda II was created for the 1994 state election. Since 2019, it has been represented by Torsten Czuppon of Alternative for Germany (AfD).

== Geography ==
As of the 2019 state election, Sömmerda II covers most of the Sömmerda district, specifically the municipalities of Alperstedt, Büchel, Buttstädt, Eckstedt, Griefstedt, Großmölsen, Großneuhausen, Großrudestedt, Günstedt, Kindelbrück, Kleinmölsen, Kleinneuhausen, Kölleda, Markvippach, Nöda, Ollendorf, Ostramondra, Rastenberg, Riethgen, Schloßvippach, Sömmerda, Sprötau, Udestedt, Vogelsberg, and Weißensee.

== Members ==
The constituency was held by the Christian Democratic Union (CDU) from its creation in 1994 until 2019, during which time it was represented by Dietmar Werner (1994–1999) and Christian Carius (1999–2019). It was won by Alternative for Germany in 2019, and is represented by Torsten Czuppon.

Election	Member	Party	%
1994	Dietmar Werner	CDU	44.9
1999	Christian Carius	CDU	47.7
2004	Christian Carius	CDU	43.7
2009	Christian Carius	CDU	31.2
2014	Christian Carius	CDU	38.3
2019	Torsten Czuppon	AfD	29.6
2024	Torsten Czuppon	AfD	42.8

== Election results ==
=== 2024 election ===
State election (2024): Sömmerda II
Notes:	Blue background denotes the winner of the electorate vote. Pink background denotes a candidate elected from their party list. Yellow background denotes an electorate win by a list member, or other incumbent. A ✓ or ✗ denotes status of any incumbent, win or lose respectively.						
Party	Candidate	Votes	%	±%	Party votes	%	±%
AfD	✓ Torsten Czuppon	13,084	42.8	▲13.2	11,768	38.1	▲10.9
CDU	Klaus Wagner	9,389	30.7	▲6.3	6,629	21.5	▲0.1
BSW					5,222	16.9	
Left	Annabell Zoegger	4,798	15.7	▼11.4	3,883	12.6	▼17.9
SPD	Stefan Carow	1,561	5.1	▼3.3	1,309	4.2	▼2.5
Greens					470	1.5	▼1.8
FW	Michael Schneider	1,212	4.0		313	1.0	
FDP	Uwe Schaefer	529	1.7	▼3.0	408	1.3	▼3.8
APT					318	1.0	▼0.4
Familie					165	0.5	
BD					153	0.5	
Values					78	0.3	
Pirates					71	0.2	▼0.1
MLPD					51	0.2	▼0.2
ÖDP					37	0.1	▼0.2
Informal votes		602			300		
Total valid votes		30,573			30,875		
Turnout		31,175	72.5	▲9.6			
AfD hold	Majority	3,695	12.1	▲9.6			

=== 2019 election ===
State election (2019): Sömmerda II
Notes:	Blue background denotes the winner of the electorate vote. Pink background denotes a candidate elected from their party list. Yellow background denotes an electorate win by a list member, or other incumbent. A ✓ or ✗ denotes status of any incumbent, win or lose respectively.						
Party	Candidate	Votes	%	±%	Party votes	%	±%
AfD	Torsten Czuppon	8,175	29.6	▲19.6	7,532	27.2	▲17.2
Left	Heike Werner	7,472	27.1	▲1.5	8,450	30.5	▲2.7
CDU	Rita Schmidtke	6,740	24.4	▼13.9	5,920	21.4	▼12.7
SPD	Christopher Harsch	2,325	8.4	▼1.6	1,844	6.7	▼3.8
FDP	Uwe Schäfer	1,298	4.7	▲1.0	1,407	5.1	▲1.8
Greens	Roberto Kobelt	1,064	3.9	▼0.2	911	3.3	▼0.8
Independent	Horst Pickrodt	397	1.4				
MLPD	Joachim Bauerle	135	0.5		100	0.4	
List-only parties					1,532	5.5	
Informal votes		480			390		
Total valid votes		27,606			27,696		
Turnout		28,086	62.9	▲11.7			
AfD gain from CDU	Majority	703	2.5				

=== 2014 election ===
State election (2014): Sömmerda II
Notes:	Blue background denotes the winner of the electorate vote. Pink background denotes a candidate elected from their party list. Yellow background denotes an electorate win by a list member, or other incumbent. A ✓ or ✗ denotes status of any incumbent, win or lose respectively.						
Party	Candidate	Votes	%	±%	Party votes	%	±%
CDU	✓ Christian Carius	9,041	38.3	▲7.1	8,057	34.1	▲2.3
Left	Tobias Steinkopf	6,044	25.6	▼2.8	6,560	27.8	▲0.2
SPD	Frank Weber	2,374	10.1	▼3.9	2,485	10.5	▼6.1
AfD	Heike Rothe	2,359	10.0		2,358	10.0	
NPD	Franz Kotzott	1,066	4.5	▼0.6	1,359	5.8	▲0.4
Greens	Matthias Finger	962	4.1	▼0.8	973	4.1	▼0.7
Free Voters	Sandra Bielesch	874	3.7	▼5.2	612	2.6	▼3.0
FDP	Heinz Untermann	868	3.7	▼3.7	787	3.3	▼4.0
List-only parties					410	1.7	
Informal votes		346			333		
Total valid votes		23,588			23,601		
Turnout		23,934	51.2	▼4.3			
CDU hold	Majority	2,997	12.7	▲9.9			

=== 2009 election ===
State election (2009): Sömmerda II
Notes:	Blue background denotes the winner of the electorate vote. Pink background denotes a candidate elected from their party list. Yellow background denotes an electorate win by a list member, or other incumbent. A ✓ or ✗ denotes status of any incumbent, win or lose respectively.						
Party	Candidate	Votes	%	±%	Party votes	%	±%
CDU	✓ Christian Carius	8,379	31.2	▼13.9	8,557	31.8	▼13.9
Left	Ralf Hauboldt	7,634	28.4	▼1.9	7,428	27.6	▲0.9
SPD	Frank Weber	3,768	14.0	▼0.1	4,460	16.6	▲4.0
Free Voters	Udo Hoffmann	2,397	8.9		1,519	5.6	▲4.2
FDP	Heinz Untermann	1,981	7.4	▲1.3	1,973	7.3	▲3.5
NPD	Dominik Weinlich	1,383	5.1		1,455	5.4	▲3.5
Greens	Kerstin Schnelle	1,314	4.9	▲0.5	1,306	4.8	▲1.4
List-only parties					233	0.9	
Informal votes		645			570		
Total valid votes		26,856			26,931		
Turnout		27,501	55.5	▲2.0			
CDU hold	Majority	745	2.8	▼12.0			

=== 2004 election ===
State election (2004): Sömmerda II
Notes:	Blue background denotes the winner of the electorate vote. Pink background denotes a candidate elected from their party list. Yellow background denotes an electorate win by a list member, or other incumbent. A ✓ or ✗ denotes status of any incumbent, win or lose respectively.						
Party	Candidate	Votes	%	±%	Party votes	%	±%
CDU	✓ Christian Carius	9,225	43.7	▼4.0	9,663	45.3	▼6.3
PDS	Ralf Hauboldt	6,617	31.4	▲8.8	5,820	27.3	▲6.3
SPD	Keven Forbrig	2,989	14.2	▼6.9	2,717	12.7	▼4.5
FDP	Heinz Untermann	1,316	6.2	▲4.0	786	3.7	▲2.4
Greens	Karin Kuhl	959	4.5		742	3.5	▲2.1
List-only parties					1,624	7.6	
Informal votes		1,222			976		
Total valid votes		21,106			21,352		
Turnout		22,328	52.0	▼6.0			
CDU hold	Majority	2,608	12.3	▲12.8			

=== 1999 election ===
State election (1999): Sömmerda II
Notes:	Blue background denotes the winner of the electorate vote. Pink background denotes a candidate elected from their party list. Yellow background denotes an electorate win by a list member, or other incumbent. A ✓ or ✗ denotes status of any incumbent, win or lose respectively.						
Party	Candidate	Votes	%	±%	Party votes	%	±%
CDU	Christian Carius	11,986	47.7	▲2.8	13,017	51.6	▲6.6
PDS	Ralf Hauboldt	5,675	22.6	▲8.9	5,288	21.0	▲6.0
SPD	Dieter Mäde	5,312	21.1	▼10.9	4,330	17.2	▼12.0
VIBT	Elisabeth Mäschker	695	2.8		386	1.5	
REP	Udo Hoffmann	662	2.6		191	0.8	▼0.2
FDP	Horst Grunert	548	2.2	▼1.2	324	1.3	▼1.9
DSU	Herbert Alexander	240	1.0	▼0.2	131	0.5	▼0.2
List-only parties					1,557	6.2	
Informal votes		502			396		
Total valid votes		25,118			25,224		
Turnout		25,620	58.0	▼14.5			
CDU hold	Majority	6,311	25.1	▲12.1			

=== 1994 election ===
State election (1994): Sömmerda II
Notes:	Blue background denotes the winner of the electorate vote. Pink background denotes a candidate elected from their party list. Yellow background denotes an electorate win by a list member, or other incumbent. A ✓ or ✗ denotes status of any incumbent, win or lose respectively.						
Party	Candidate	Votes	%	±%	Party votes	%	±%
CDU	Dietmar Werner	14,482	44.9		14,523	45.0	
SPD		10,292	31.9		9,410	29.1	
PDS		4,440	13.8		4,870	15.1	
Greens		1,549	4.8		1,411	4.4	
FDP		1,084	3.4		1,032	3.2	
DSU		382	1.2		212	0.7	
List-only parties					831	2.6	
Informal votes		1,084			1,024		
Total valid votes		32,229			32,289		
Turnout		33,313	72.7				
CDU win new seat	Majority	4,190	13.0				
