= Beringen, Luxembourg =

Coordinates: 49°45′36″N 6°07′12″E

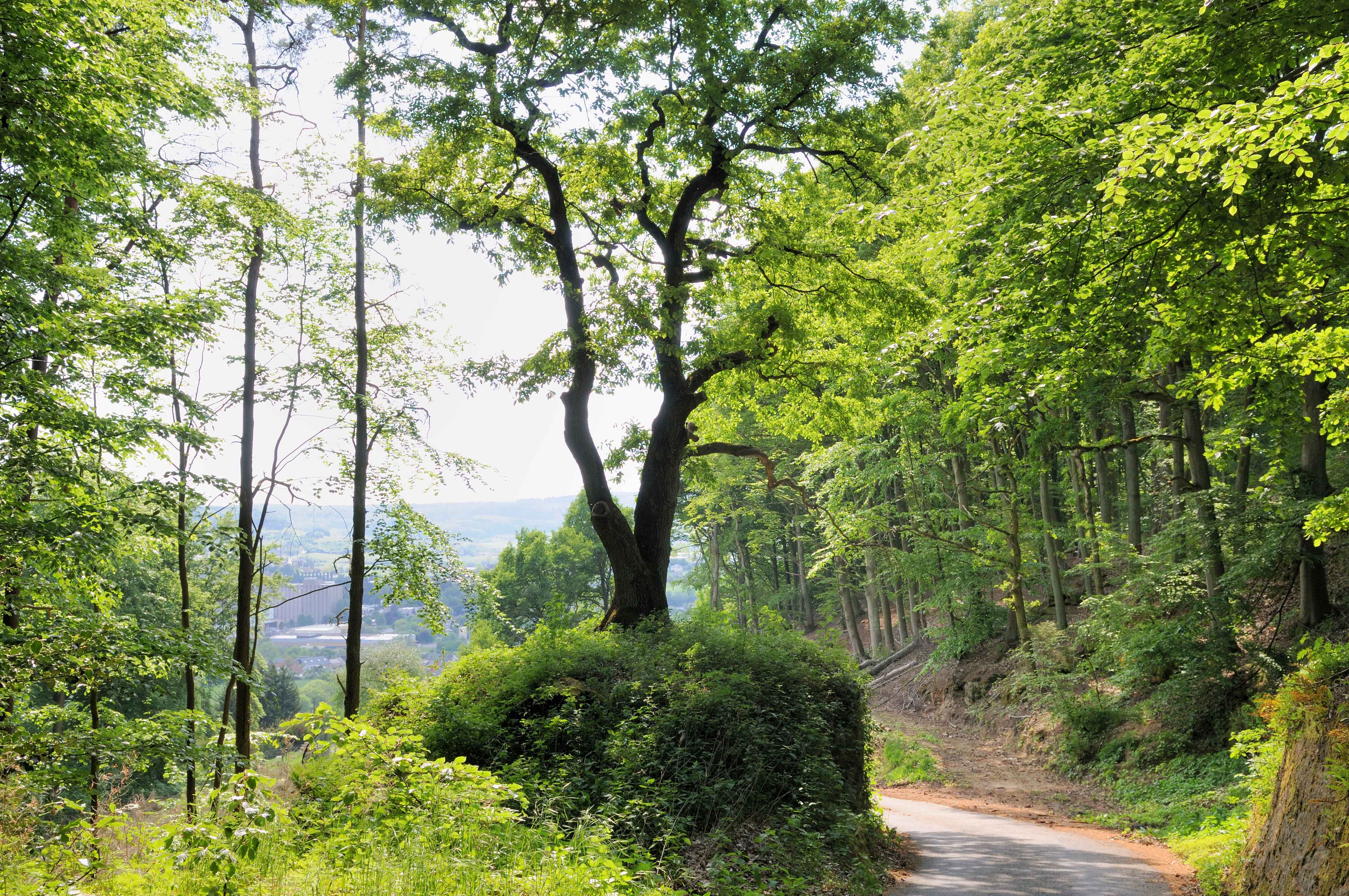
Remarkable oak near Beringen

Beringen (German pronunciation: [ˈbeːʁɪŋən]; Luxembourgish: Biereng) is a small town in the commune of Mersch, in central Luxembourg. As of September 2026, the town had a population of 1,284. It is situated approximately 16 km (10 mi) from the capital city of Luxembourg, as the crow flies.

== History ==
Perhaps the earliest written mention of Beringen is in a deed of gift from Erkanfridas, the widow of a minor nobleman. It was written in 853, and mentions a forest in Beringen which was to become the property of the abbey of St. Maximin.

In 1325, Beringen was included in the list of dairies belonging to the jurisdiction given by the high court of John the Blind to the Lord of Mersch, Johann von Meilberg.

The village of Beringen was more fortunate during the Thirty Years' War than many other towns in the area. Of the thirteen serf estates existing before the war, twelve still remained at the end of the war.

The entrepreneur Mathias Probst built a new stone bridge over the Alzette in 1837-1840. This bridge was blown up by the Germans in September 1944 during the retreat, and was rebuilt in 1948-1949 by the entrepreneur Jos Kieffer.

A serious fire ravaged the town on 18 June 1858, destroying eleven houses.

== Church ==
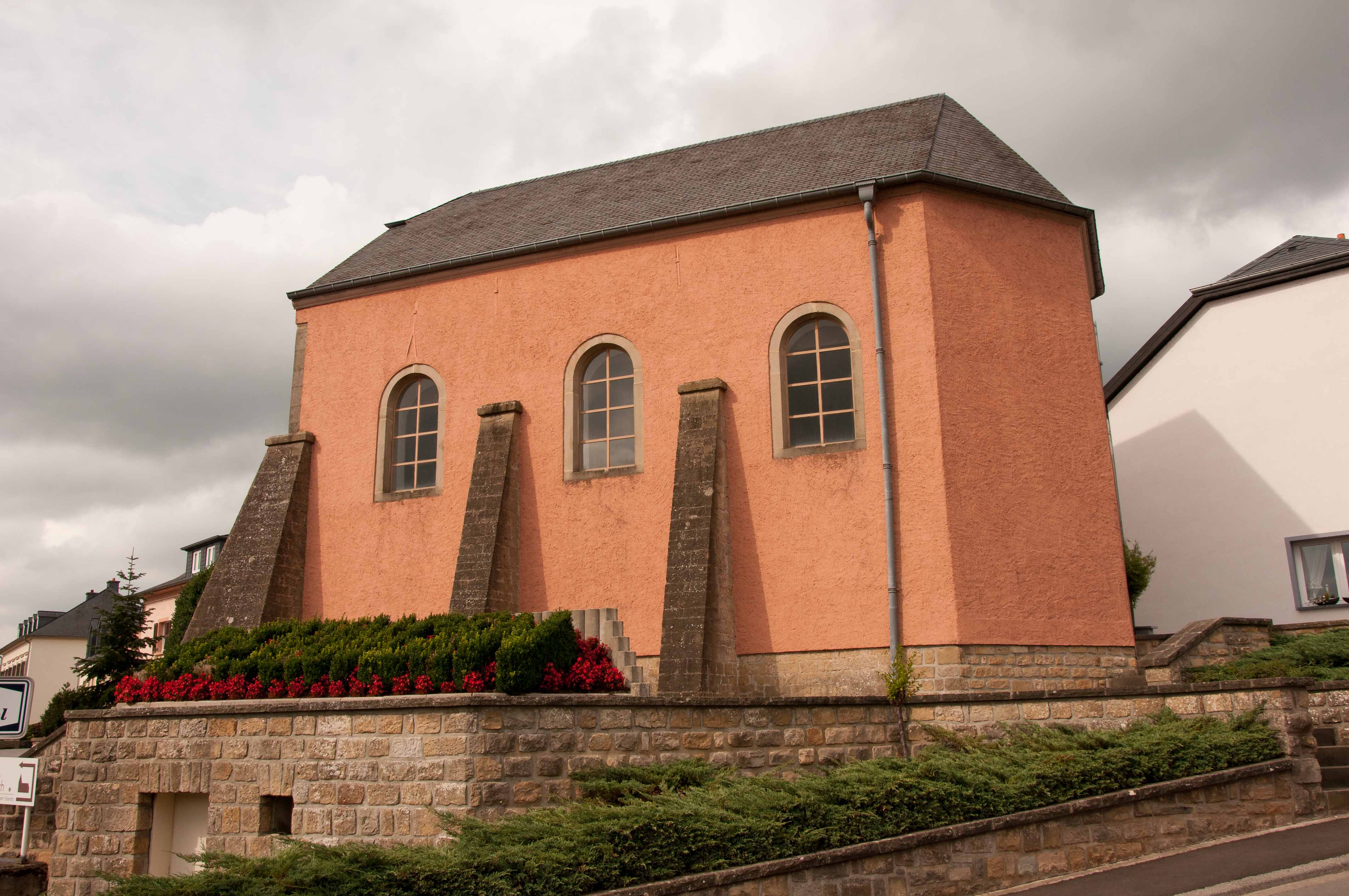
The Chapel

By the late fourteenth century, Beringen had a small chapel. This was replaced in 1715 by a slightly larger house of worship, known today as the old chapel. After nearly two hundred years, it, too, no longer met the needs of the village, and a new chapel was blessed on 6 September 1905. This chapel is the current parish church.

In 1933, villagers under the leadership of Messrs. Rollinger, Bunsen, and Huss built the Muttergottesgrotte (Mother of God Grotto), in the atrium of the church. It was built using many fossilized sea shells collected near Beringen. The impulse to build this grotto may have been inspired by the 1933 canonization of St. Bernadette.

The old chapel was restored in 1988.

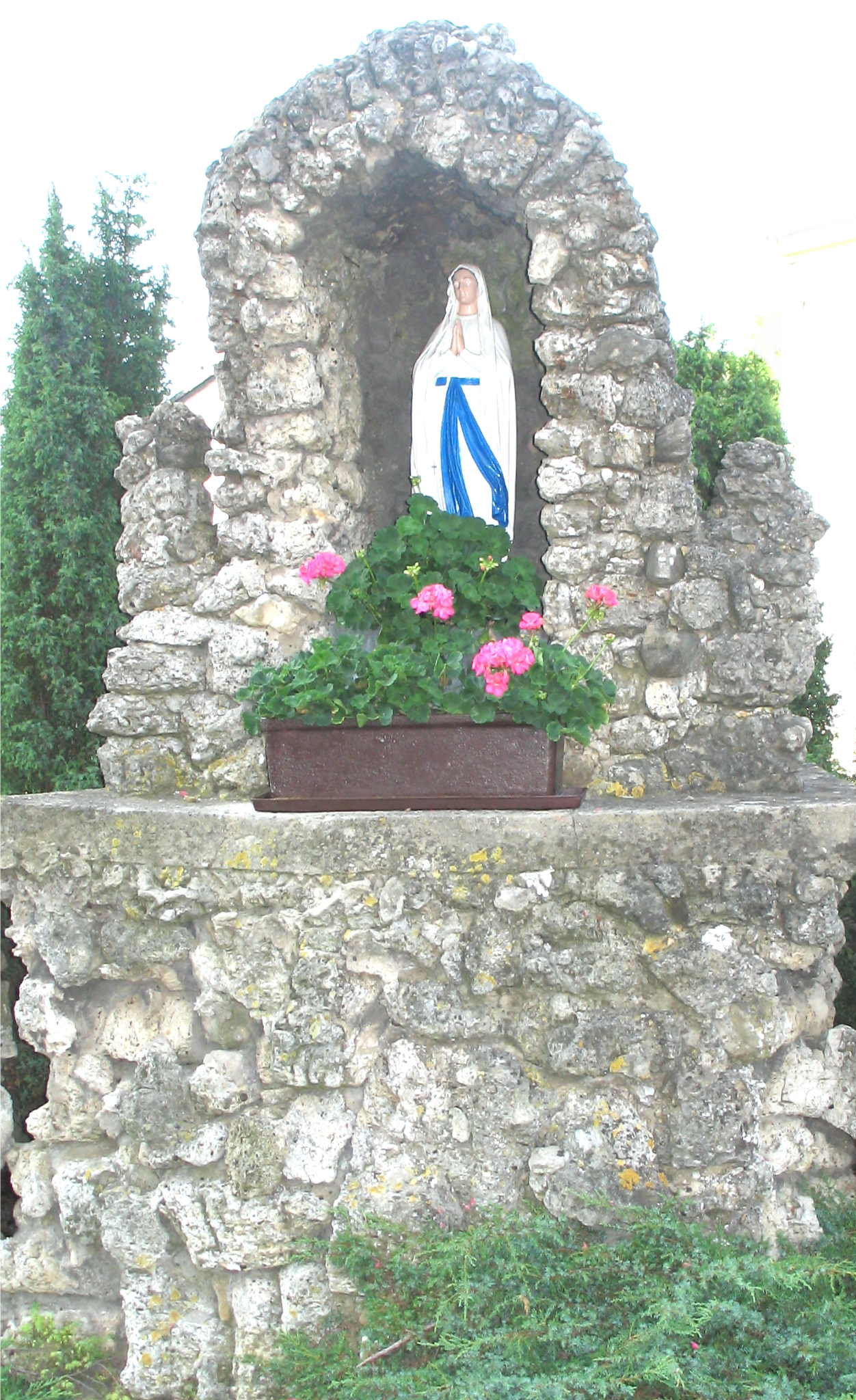
Shrine

== School ==
The old school next to the shepherd's house, opposite the old chapel, was retired in 1935. The new school, officially inaugurated 22 October 1939, was taught by Jos Schlitz. There were seven elementary classes and at times up to 60 students.

== Brooks ==
- Winter brook (Beringen)

== Five other Beringens ==
Beringen, Luxembourg, is one of five towns in Europe with the name Beringen. The others are located in Belgium, the Netherlands, Germany, and Switzerland. Since 1974, the five similarly named towns have formed an association, International Amicale 5x Beringen, with the stated goals of organizing international 5x Beringen games, promoting sporting activity, promoting international understanding, and promoting social life. Since 1975, this club has become the driving social force in Beringen, Luxembourg.
