= Andreas Bühl =

German politician (born 1987)

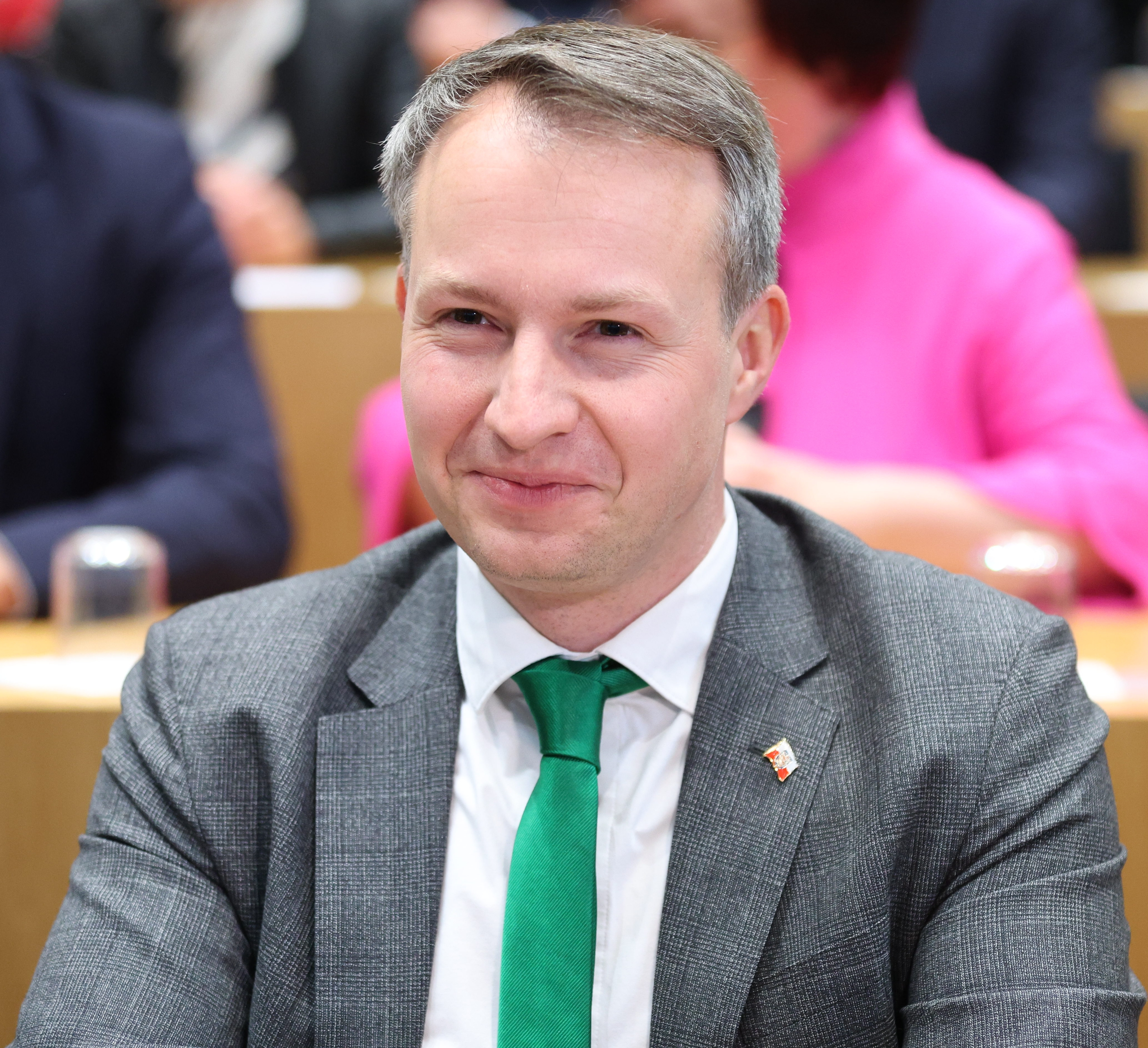
- Bühl in 2024

Member of the Landtag of Thuringia
- Incumbent
- Assumed office 14 October 2014
- Preceded by: Petra Enders
- Constituency: Ilm-Kreis I

Personal details
- Born: 6 February 1987 (age 39)
- Party: Christian Democratic Union
- Relatives: Marcus Bühl (brother)

Andreas Bühl (born 6 February 1987) is a German politician serving as a member of the Landtag of Thuringia since 2014. He has served as group leader of the Christian Democratic Union since 2024.
