= 1999 German presidential election =

- 23 May 1999
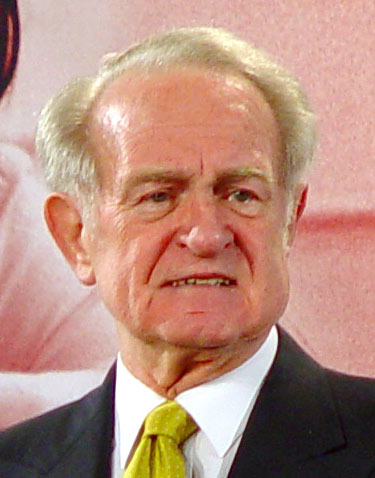

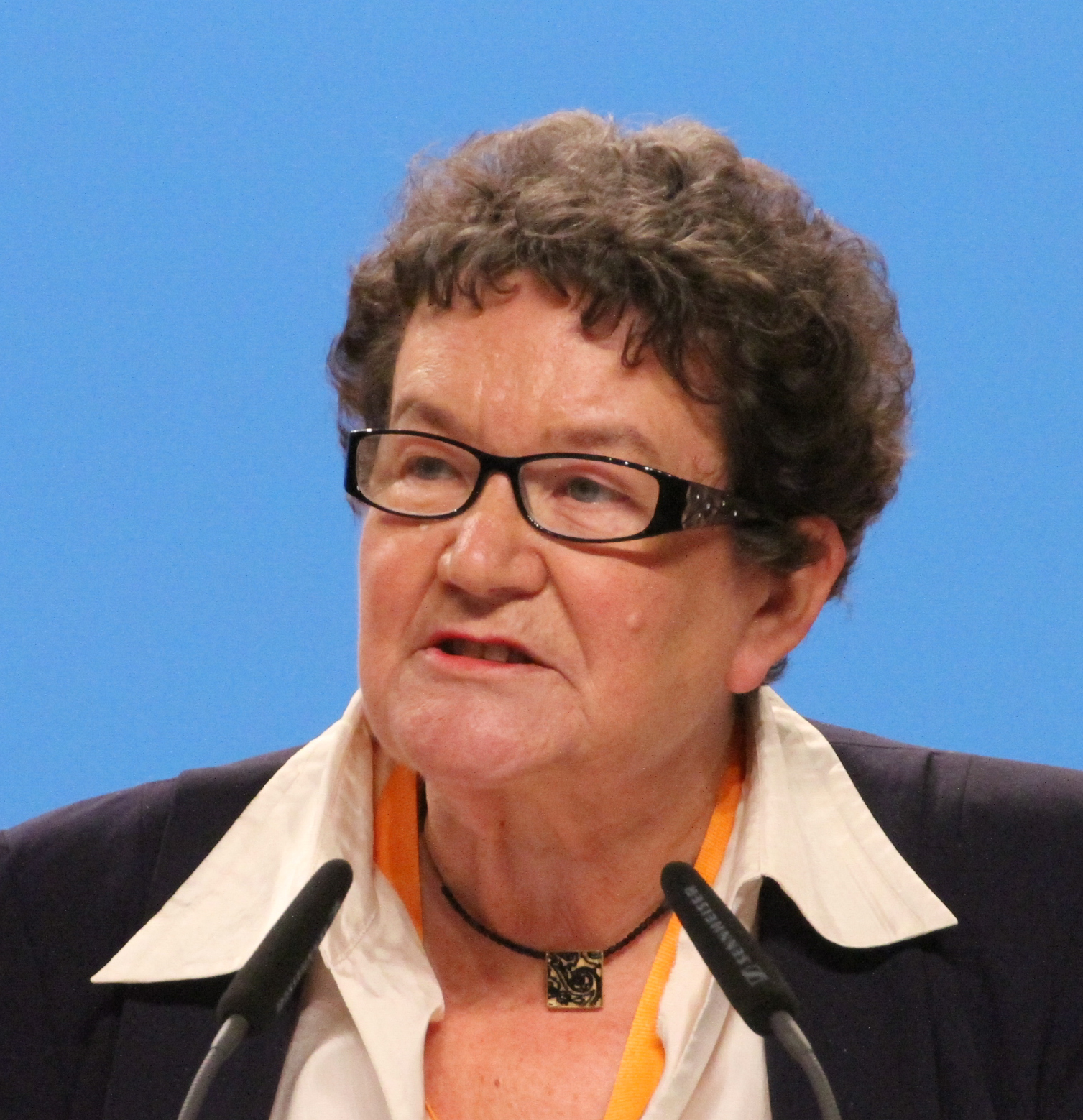

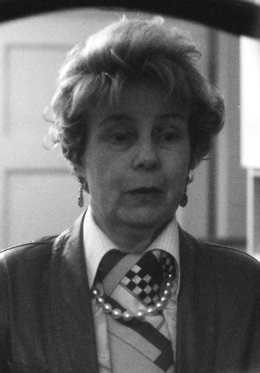
Nominee	Johannes Rau	Dagmar Schipanski	Uta Ranke-Heinemann
Party	SPD	CDU	Independent
Electoral vote	657 (1st round); 690 (2nd round)	588 (1st round); 572 (2nd round)	69 (1st round); 62 (2nd round)
Percentage	51.6%	42.8%	4.6%
Nominators	SPD, Grüne	CDU/CSU	PDS
President before election
Roman Herzog
CDU
Elected President
Johannes Rau
SPD

An indirect presidential election (officially the 11th Federal Convention) saw the former Social Democrat minister-president of North Rhine-Westphalia defeat Christian Democrat Dagmar Schipanski and the nonpartisan academic Uta Ranke-Heinemann, who had been endorsed by the Party of Democratic Socialism.

== Composition of the Federal Convention ==
The president is elected by the Federal Convention consisting of all the members of the Bundestag and an equal number of delegates representing the states. These are divided proportionally by population to each state, and each state's delegation is divided among the political parties represented in its parliament so as to reflect the partisan proportions in the parliament.

By party		By state	
Party	Members	State	Members
SPD	565	Bundestag	669
CDU/CSU	547	Baden-Württemberg	82
Greens	96	Bavaria	98
PDS	65	Berlin	27
FDP	56	Brandenburg	23
Republicans	7	Bremen	5
DVU	2	Hamburg	13
Total	1338	Hesse	47
		Mecklenburg-Vorpommern	16
		North Rhine-Westphalia	143
		Rhineland-Palatinate	33
		Saarland	9
		Saxony	39
		Saxony-Anhalt	24
		Schleswig-Holstein	23
		Thuringia	22
		Total	1338

Source: Eine Dokumentation aus Anlass der Wahl des Bundespräsidenten am 18. März 2012

== Results ==
Candidate	Nominating party	Round One		Round Two	
Candidate	Nominating party	Votes	Percentage	Votes	Percentage
Johannes Rau	SPD, Greens	657	49.1	690	51.6
Dagmar Schipanski	CDU/CSU	588	43.9	572	42.8
Uta Ranke-Heinemann	Independent (endorsed by PDS)	69	5.2	62	4.6
