= Dagmar Schipanski =

German politician (1943–2022)

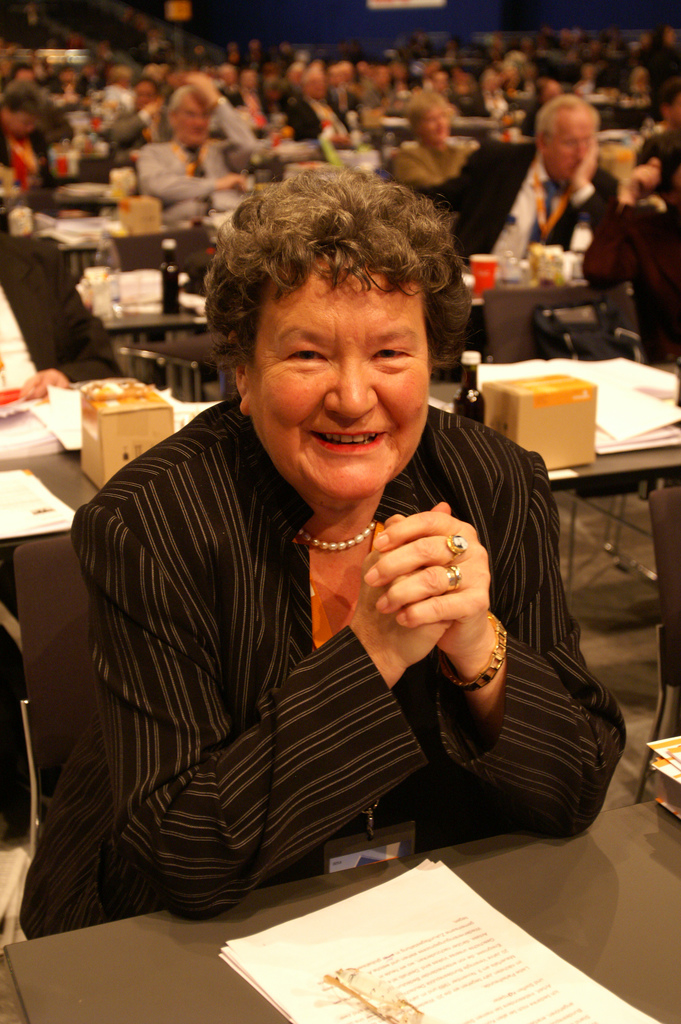
- Schipanski at the CDU-Bundesparteitag 2008 in Stuttgart

President of the Landtag of Thuringia
- In office 8 July 2004 – 28 September 2009
- Minister-President: Dieter Althaus
- Preceded by: Christine Lieberknecht
- Succeeded by: Birgit Diezel

Minister of Science, Research and the Arts of Thuringia
- In office 1 October 1999 – 8 July 2004
- Minister-President: Bernhard Vogel; Dieter Althaus
- Preceded by: Gerd Schuchardt (Science, Research and Culture)
- Succeeded by: Position abolished

Member of the Landtag of Thuringia
- In office 8 July 2004 – 28 September 2009
- Constituency: CDU List

Personal details
- Born: Dagmar Elisabeth Eichhorn; 3 September 1943 Sättelstädt, Thuringia, Germany
- Died: 7 September 2022 (aged 79)
- Party: Christian Democratic Union
- Profession: Physicist; academic; politician
- Website: www.dagmar-schipanski.de/en/

Dagmar Elisabeth Schipanski (née Eichhorn; 3 September 1943 – 7 September 2022) was a German physicist, academic, and politician from Thuringia. Although best known for her 1999 nomination as President of Germany by the conservative Christian Democratic Union (CDU) and its sister party, the Christian Social Union of Bavaria (CSU), Schipanski held a variety of political and academic roles during her four-decade-long career and was awarded numerous honors, most notably the Order of Merit of the Federal Republic of Germany in 1996.

== Early life ==
Schipanski was born on 3 September 1943 in Sättelstädt, Thuringia, which later became a part of the German Democratic Republic. Her mother was a teacher, and her father was a pastor, who died in World War II. After graduating from high school in 1962, she became a student of applied physics at the Technical University of Magdeburg. In 1967, Schipanski began her career as an engineer, followed by a period of working as an assistant at TU Ilmenau. After earning her doctorate in 1976, Schipanski began her academic career as a lecturer in Ilmenau and, starting in 1990, as a professor. She served as Dean of the Faculty of Electrical Engineering and Information Technology at TU Ilmenau from 1992 to 1993 and as Rector of TU Ilmenau from 1995 to 1996.

From 1996 to 1998, Schipanski served as chair of the German Council of Science and Humanities, an advisory body that makes recommendations on the development of science and research to both the federal government and the state governments of Germany. She was elected to the Leopoldina, the national academy of Germany, in 1998, and served as a member of the Academia Europaea.

== Political career ==
Despite not being a member of either party, Schipanski was nominated by the CDU and the CSU to be their candidate in the 1999 Presidential election. Schipanski lost the election to the former minister-president of North Rhine-Westphalia, Johannes Rau, a member of the Social Democratic Party, receiving 572 votes to Rau's 690 on the second ballot.

After her defeat, Schipanski remained active in politics and was appointed Minister of Science, Research, and the Arts in the cabinet of the minister-president of Thuringa, Bernhard Vogel, later that year. Schipanski would later join the CDU in 1999 and would remain in her ministerial position until 2004 when she was elected to the Landtag of Thuringia and became President of the Landtag. Schipanski lost her position in the Landtag as a result of the 2009 state election.

== Personal life ==
Schipanski, a Protestant, was married and had three children. One of her children, Tankred, was a member of the Bundestag from 2009 until 2021.

Schipanski died on 7 September 2022 at the age of 79, after a short, serious illness.

== Memberships ==
Since 1998, Schipanski has been a member of the board of directors of the MDR. From 2001 to 2007, she served as a member of the UNESCO World Commission on the Ethics of Scientific Knowledge and Technology. From 2000 to 2009, Schipanski served as President of the German Cancer Aid. She has served as a member of the board of trustees of the German Foundation for Monument Protection since 2000, as chair of the board of the Lennart Bernadotte Foundation since 2003, and, since 2005, as the chair of the board of trustees of the Fraunhofer Institute for Digital Media Technology.

Schipanski was an ambassador for the New Social Market Economy initiative and has served as a member of the Presidium of the Oskar Patzelt Foundation. She temporarily served as a member of the board of trustees of the Körber Foundation before leaving her post due to pressure from anti-tobacco activists. Since 2008, Schipanski has served as a member of the board of trustees of the International Martin Luther Foundation.
