= Patrice Jeener =

French artist (1944–2026)

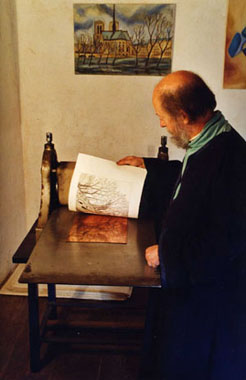
Jeener in 2016

Patrice Jeener (31 July 1944 – 3 March 2026) was a French artist and copper engraver, specialising in work of a mathematical nature.

== Life and career ==
Jeener was born on 31 July 1944. He studied at the Lycée Janson de Sailly and then (1963) at the École nationale supérieure des beaux-arts. Already influenced by the engravings of Maurits Escher and Flake's treatise on curvilinear perspective, he has exhibited at the Palais de la Découverte and the Institut Henri Poincaré. This included models of mathematical functions made out of plaster that he decided to use as inspiration.

He lived and worked at La Motte-Chalancon, a village between Vercors and Baronnies in Provence. Jeener died on 3 March 2026, at the age of 81.

Examples of his work include the following:

- « Topologie des surfaces » (surface topology),
- « Géométrie à 4 dimensions » (4-dimensional geometry),
- « Bouteille de Klein » (Klein bottle).
