= Sascha Bilay =

Member of the Landtag of Thuringia
- In office 2019–2024

Personal details
- Born: April 12, 1979 (age 47) Ilmenau, Thuringia, Germany (then East Germany)
- Party: Die Linke (since 2007)
- Other political affiliations: PDS (until 2007)

Sascha Bilay (born 12 April 1979) is a German politician from The Left. He was a member of the Landtag of Thuringia from 2019 to 2024.

== Life ==
After graduating from high school in 1998, Sascha Bilay studied political science, sociology and Eastern European history at the University of Jena until 2005. In addition, he obtained a degree in administrative management in 2010. From 2004 to 2012, he was a research assistant for local politics and administrative reform in the Thuringian parliamentary group of the Left Party. From 2012 to 2019, Bilay was head of the office of the then mayor of Eisenach, Katja Wolf (then Die Linke).

Bilay is married, has one child and lives in Eisenach.

== Political career ==
Bilay joined the former PDS in 1996. He represented his party on the city council of Ilmenau from 1999 to 2007 and ran for mayor in 2006. In 2012 and 2024 he applied to be district administrator of the Wartburg district, where he was also a member of the district council from 2021 to 2024.

In the 2019 Thuringian state election, he received a state parliament mandate via his party's state list, but failed to win re-election in the following the 2024 Thuringian state election.

In September 2024, Bilay was elected chairman of the Gotha district association of Die Linke. He is also running for a seat in the Gotha – Ilm-Kreis constituency in the 2025 German federal election.
