= Marcus Bühl =

German politician (born 1977)

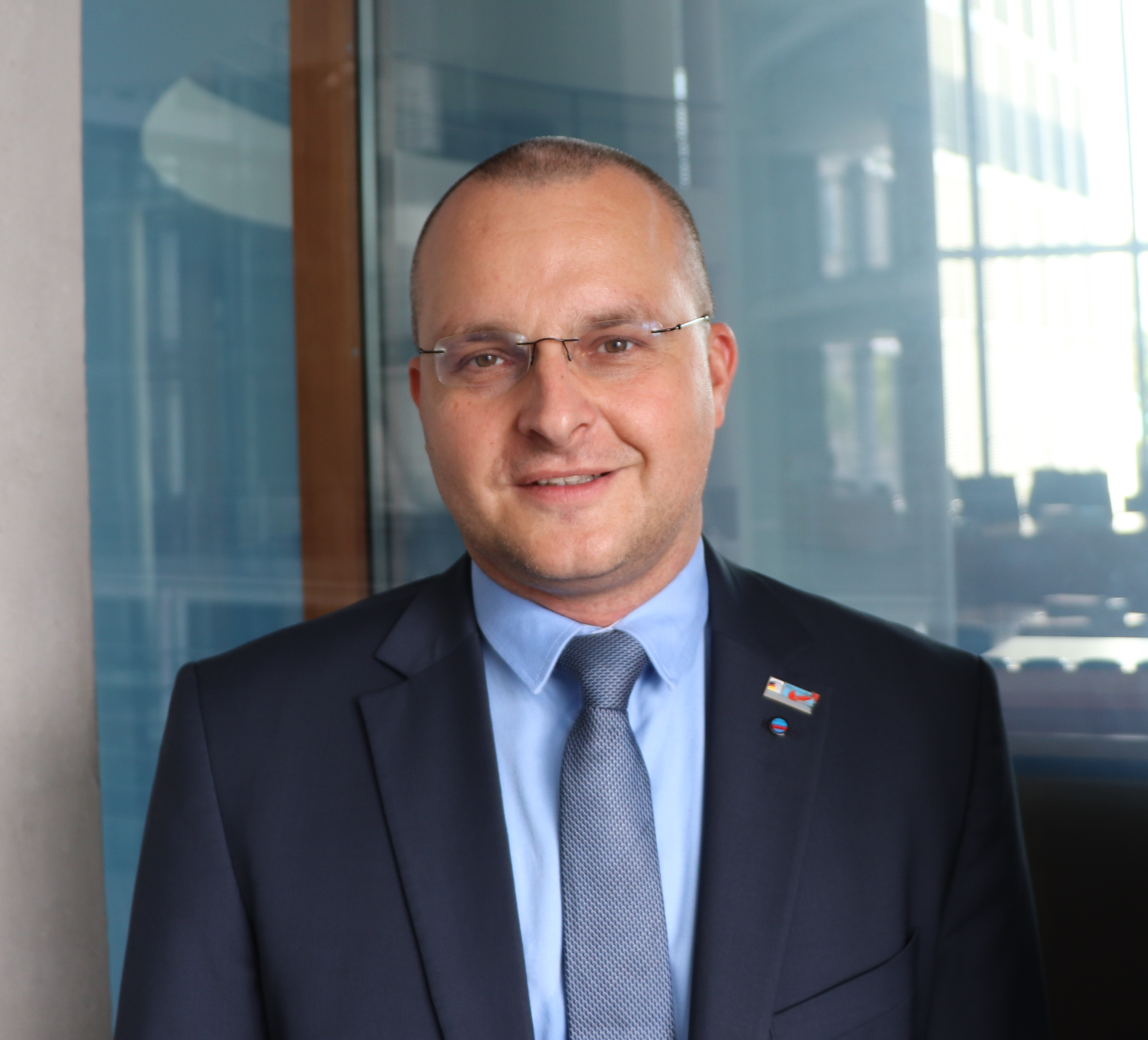
- Marcus Bühl in 2019

Member of the Bundestag
- Incumbent
- Assumed office 2017

Personal details
- Born: 29 April 1977 (age 48) Ilmenau, East Germany (now Germany)
- Party: AfD
- Relatives: Andreas Bühl (brother)

Marcus Bühl (born 29 April 1977) is a German politician. Born in Ilmenau, Thuringia, he represents Alternative for Germany (AfD). Marcus Bühl has served as a member of the Bundestag from the state of Thuringia since 2017.

== Life ==
He became member of the Bundestag after the 2017 German federal election. He is a member of the Budget Committee of Bundestag.

In the 2021 German federal election, he won a direct mandate in Gotha – Ilm-Kreis defeating Tankred Schipanski from the Christian Democratic Union.
