= Sannerville =

- Commune
- Coat of arms
- Location of Sannerville
- Location within France Location within Normandy
- Coordinates: 49°10′53″N 0°13′18″W
- Country: France
- Region: Normandy
- Department: Calvados
- Arrondissement: Caen
- Canton: Troarn
- Intercommunality: CU Caen Mer

Government
  - Mayor (2020–2026): Martial Bordais
- Area^{1}: 5.14 km^{2} (1.98 sq mi)
- Elevation: 15 m (49 ft)
- Highest elevation: 55 m (180 ft)
- Lowest elevation: 7 m (23 ft)
- Population (2023): 1,905
  - Density: 371/km^{2} (960/sq mi)
- Time zone: UTC+01:00 (CET)
  - Summer (DST): UTC+02:00 (CEST)
- INSEE/Postal code: 14666 /14940
- ^{1} French Land Register data, which excludes lakes, ponds, glaciers > 1 km^{2} (0.386 sq mi or 247 acres) and river estuaries.

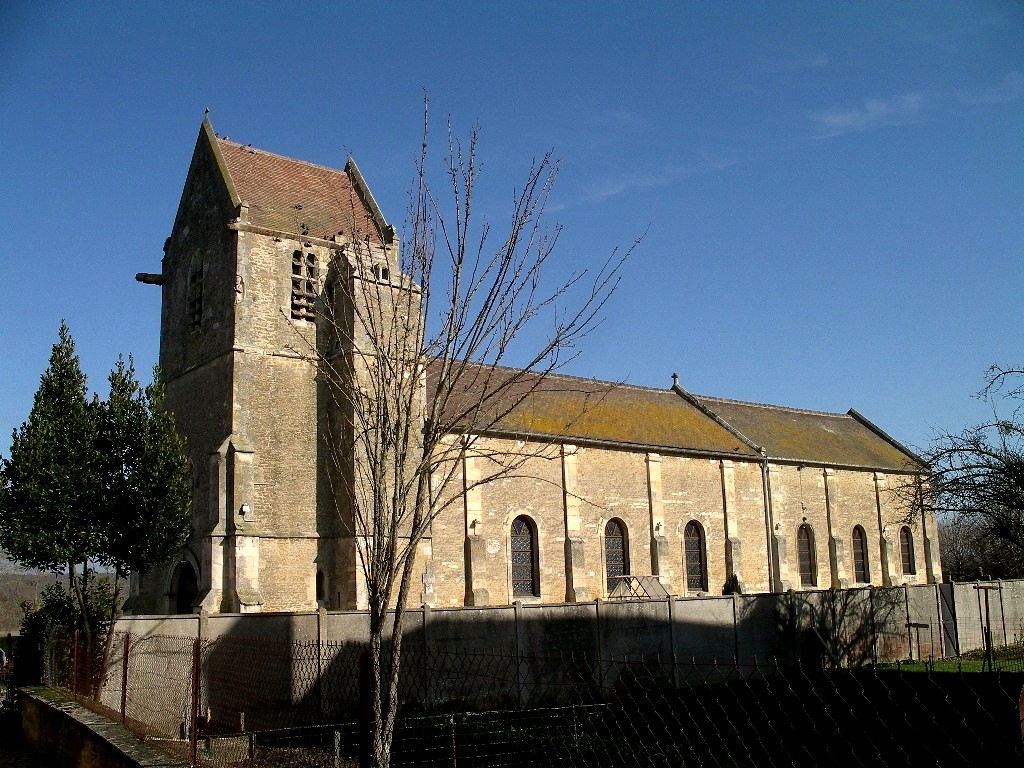
Sannerville

Sannerville (French pronunciation: [sanɛʁvil]) is a commune in the Calvados department in the Normandy region in northwestern France. On 1 January 2017, it was merged into the new commune Saline, but this merger was undone on 31 December 2019.

== Population ==
Historical population

| Year | Pop. | ±% p.a. |
|---|---|---|
| 1793 | 496 | — |
| 1861 | 524 | +0.08% |
| 1911 | 347 | −0.82% |
| 1962 | 649 | +1.24% |
| 1968 | 711 | +1.53% |
| 1975 | 849 | +2.57% |
| 1982 | 1,504 | +8.51% |

| Year | Pop. | ±% p.a. |
|---|---|---|
| 1990 | 1,529 | +0.21% |
| 1999 | 1,624 | +0.67% |
| 2007 | 1,576 | −0.37% |
| 2012 | 1,756 | +2.19% |
| 2017 | 1,918 | +1.78% |
| 2023 | 1,905 | −0.11% |

Population corresponding to the territory of Sannerville as on 1st of January 2025.
Source: EHESS and INSEE

== See also ==
- Communes of the Calvados department
