= Hörselberg =

- Village of Hörselberg-Hainich
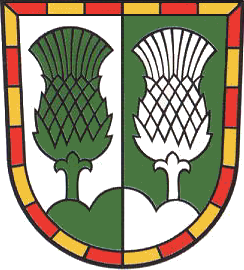
- Coat of arms
- Interactive map of Hörselberg
- Location within Germany Location within Thuringia
- Coordinates: 50°58′50″N 10°25′45″E
- Country: Germany
- State: Thuringia
- District: Wartburgkreis
- Town: Hörselberg-Hainich
- Disbanded: 1 December 2007

Area
  - Total: 63.24 km^{2} (24.42 sq mi)
- Elevation: 260–352 m (853–1,155 ft)

Population (2006-12-31)
  - Total: 3,270
  - Density: 51.7/km^{2} (134/sq mi)
- Time zone: UTC+01:00 (CET)
  - Summer (DST): UTC+02:00 (CEST)
- Postal codes: 99819, 99848
- Dialling codes: 036920, 03622
- Website: www.gemeinde-hoerselberg.de

Hörselberg is a former municipality in the Wartburgkreis district of Thuringia, Germany. Since 1 December 2007, it is part of the municipality Hörselberg-Hainich.
