= Saline, Calvados =

Saline
- Former commune
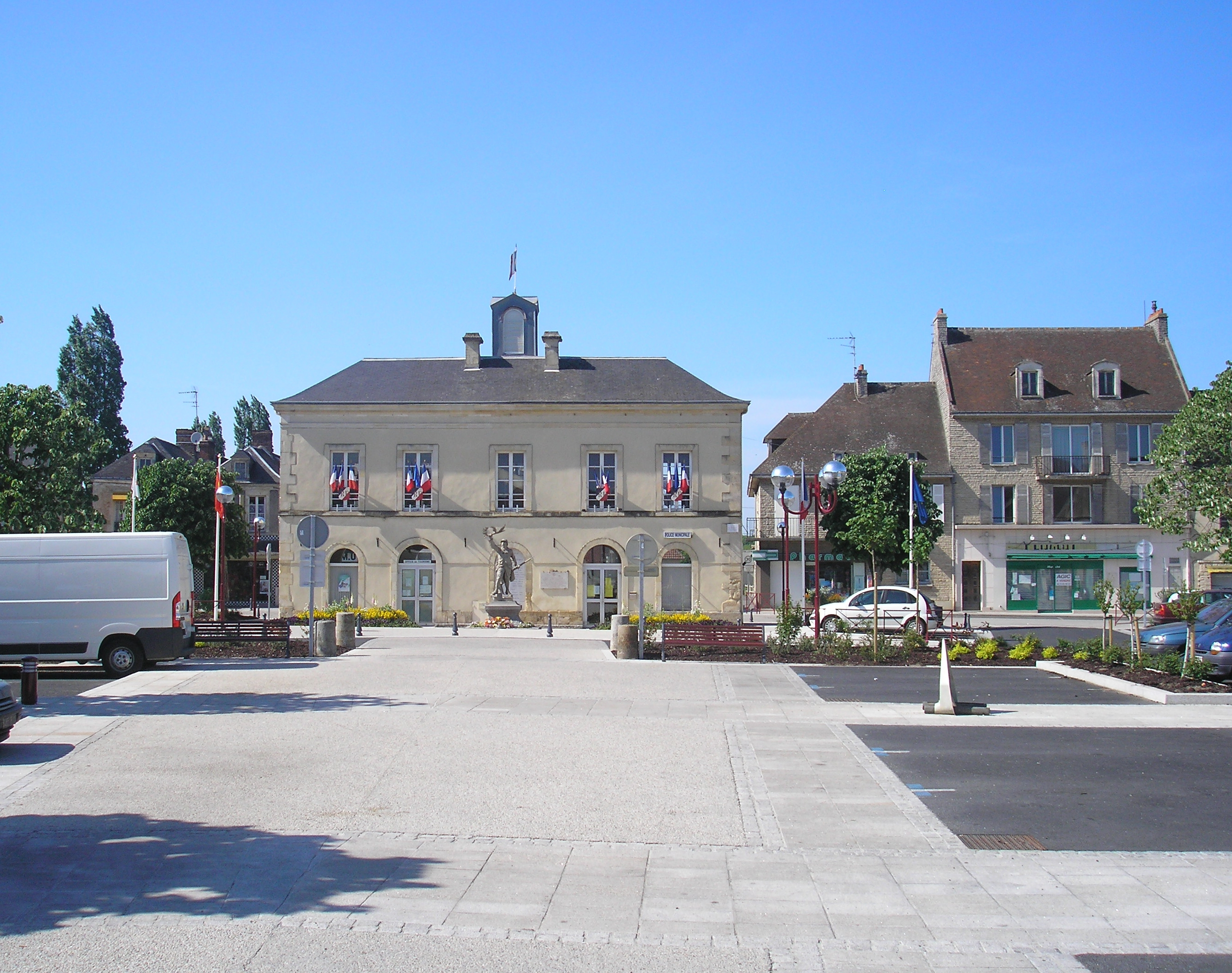
- The Paul Quellec square in Troarn
- Location of Saline
- Location within France Location within Normandy
- Coordinates: 49°10′55″N 0°10′59″W
- Country: France
- Region: Normandy
- Department: Calvados
- Arrondissement: Caen
- Canton: Troarn
- Area^{1}: 16.67 km^{2} (6.44 sq mi)
- Population (2017): 5,428
  - Density: 325.6/km^{2} (843.3/sq mi)
- Time zone: UTC+01:00 (CET)
  - Summer (DST): UTC+02:00 (CEST)
- INSEE/Postal code: 14712 /14670
- ^{1} French Land Register data, which excludes lakes, ponds, glaciers > 1 km^{2} (0.386 sq mi or 247 acres) and river estuaries.

Saline (French pronunciation: [salin]) was a short-lived commune in the department of Calvados, northwestern France. The municipality was established on 1 January 2017 by merger of the former communes of Troarn (the seat) and Sannerville. This merger was revoked by the administrative court, and on 31 December 2019 the former communes Troarn and Sannerville were recreated.

== See also ==
- Communes of the Calvados department
