= Tantonville =

- Commune
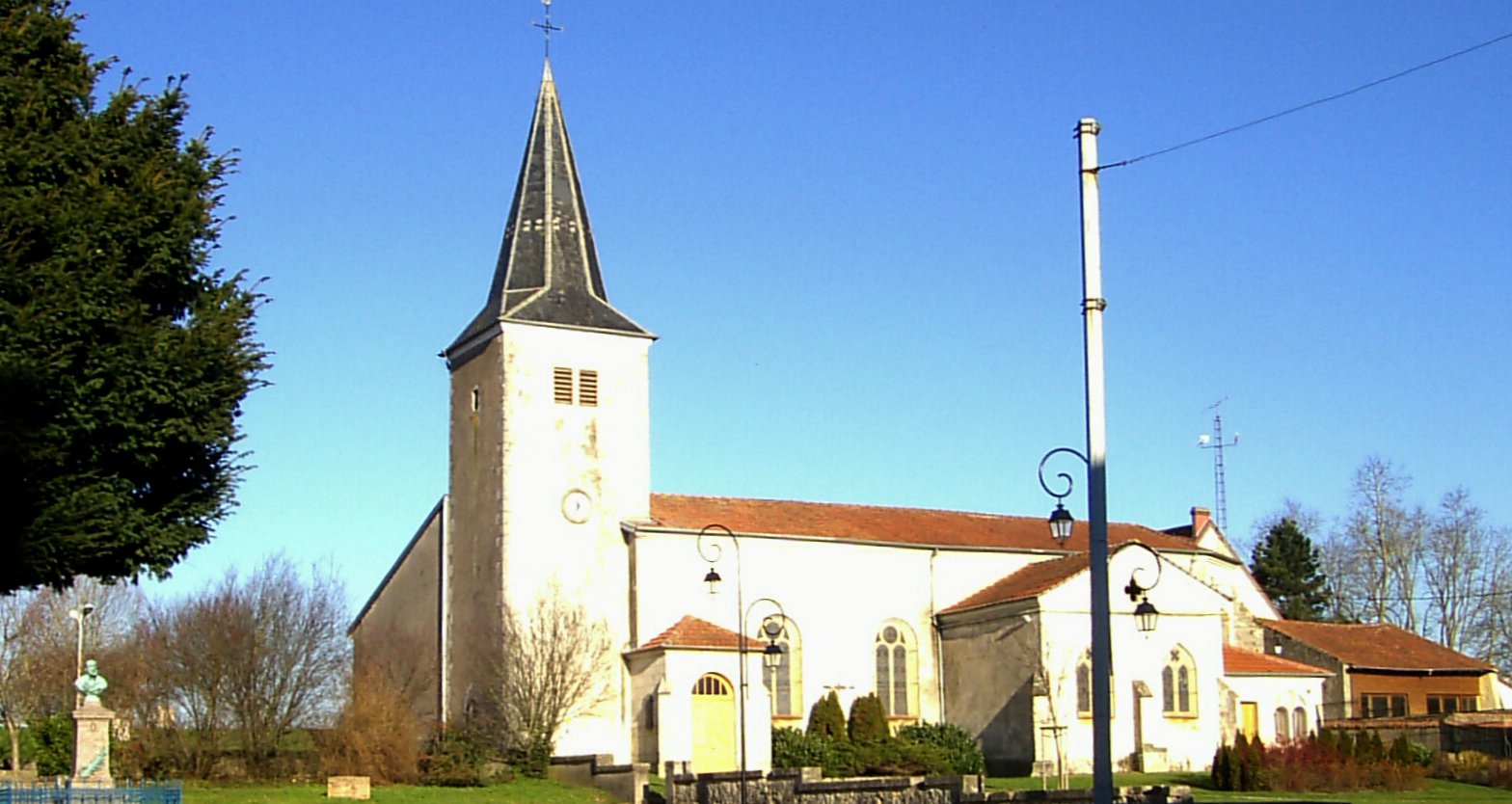
- The church in Tantonville

- Coat of arms
- Location of Tantonville
- Location within France Location within Grand Est
- Coordinates: 48°28′11″N 6°08′23″E
- Country: France
- Region: Grand Est
- Department: Meurthe-et-Moselle
- Arrondissement: Nancy
- Canton: Meine au Saintois
- Intercommunality: CC Pays du Saintois

Government
  - Mayor (2020–2026): François Xemay
- Area^{1}: 8.09 km^{2} (3.12 sq mi)
- Elevation: 305 m (1,001 ft)
- Highest elevation: 327 m (1,073 ft)
- Lowest elevation: 246 m (807 ft)
- Population (2023): 663
  - Density: 82.0/km^{2} (212/sq mi)
- Time zone: UTC+01:00 (CET)
  - Summer (DST): UTC+02:00 (CEST)
- INSEE/Postal code: 54513 /54116
- ^{1} French Land Register data, which excludes lakes, ponds, glaciers > 1 km^{2} (0.386 sq mi or 247 acres) and river estuaries.

Tantonville (French pronunciation: [tɑ̃tɔ̃vil]) is a commune in the Meurthe-et-Moselle department in north-eastern France.

== See also ==
- Communes of the Meurthe-et-Moselle department
