= Hörselberg-Hainich =

- Municipality
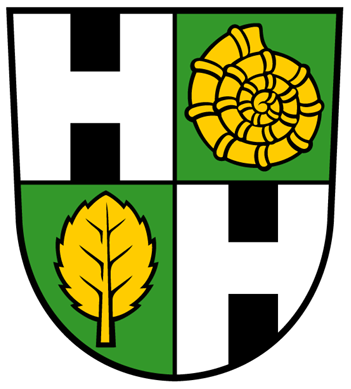
- Coat of arms

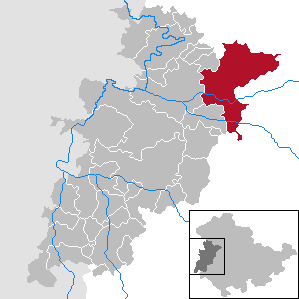
- Location of Hörselberg-Hainich within Wartburgkreis district
- Interactive map of Hörselberg-Hainich
- Location within Germany Location within Thuringia
- Coordinates: 51°0′30″N 10°28′39″E
- Country: Germany
- State: Thuringia
- District: Wartburgkreis

Government
  - Mayor (2024–30): Sven Kellner

Area
  - Total: 142 km^{2} (55 sq mi)
- Elevation: 260–352 m (853–1,155 ft)

Population (2025-12-31)
  - Total: 5,979
  - Density: 42.1/km^{2} (109/sq mi)
- Time zone: UTC+01:00 (CET)
  - Summer (DST): UTC+02:00 (CEST)
- Postal codes: 99819, 99848, 99947
- Dialling codes: 03622, 036254, 036920
- Vehicle registration: WAK
- Website: www.hoerselberg-hainich.de

Hörselberg-Hainich is a municipality in the Wartburgkreis district of Thuringia, Germany. It was formed on 1 December 2007 combining the former municipalities of Behringen and Hörselberg.
