= La Motte-Chalancon =

- Commune
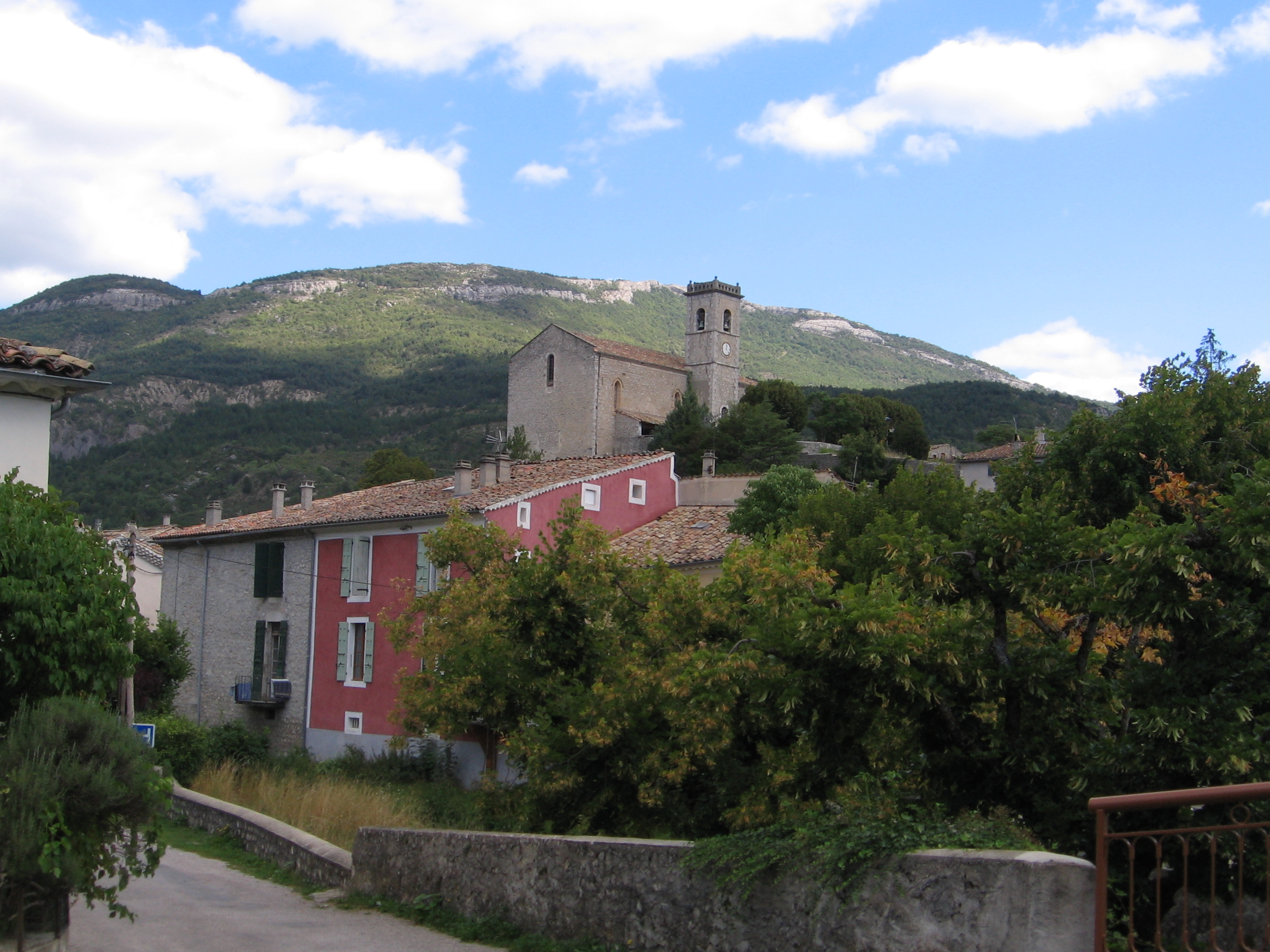
- The church and surroundings of La Motte-Chalancon
- Location of La Motte-Chalancon
- Location within France Location within Auvergne-Rhône-Alpes
- Coordinates: 44°29′09″N 5°22′49″E
- Country: France
- Region: Auvergne-Rhône-Alpes
- Department: Drôme
- Arrondissement: Die
- Canton: Le Diois
- Intercommunality: Diois

Government
  - Mayor (2020–2026): Laurent Combel
- Area^{1}: 22.83 km^{2} (8.81 sq mi)
- Highest elevation: 1,424 m (4,672 ft)
- Lowest elevation: 517 m (1,696 ft)
- Population (2023): 395
  - Density: 17.3/km^{2} (44.8/sq mi)
- Time zone: UTC+01:00 (CET)
  - Summer (DST): UTC+02:00 (CEST)
- INSEE/Postal code: 26215 /26470
- ^{1} French Land Register data, which excludes lakes, ponds, glaciers > 1 km^{2} (0.386 sq mi or 247 acres) and river estuaries.

La Motte-Chalancon (French pronunciation: [la mɔt ʃalɑ̃kɔ̃]; Occitan: La Mota de Chalancon) is a commune in the Drôme department in southeastern France.

== Population ==
Historical population
Year	Pop.	±% p.a.
1968	486	—
1975	398	−2.81%
1982	393	−0.18%
1990	382	−0.35%
1999	395	+0.37%
2007	464	+2.03%
2012	396	−3.12%
2017	426	+1.47%
2023	395	−1.25%
Source: INSEE

== See also ==
- Communes of the Drôme department
- Patrice Jeener
