= Behringen =

- Village of Hörselberg-Hainich
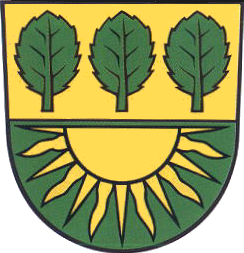
- Coat of arms
- Interactive map of Behringen
- Location within Germany Location within Thuringia
- Coordinates: 51°01′17″N 10°52′36″E
- Country: Germany
- State: Thuringia
- District: Wartburgkreis
- Town: Hörselberg-Hainich

Area
  - Total: 78.71 km^{2} (30.39 sq mi)
- Elevation: 285 m (935 ft)

Population (2006-12-31)
  - Total: 3,339
  - Density: 42.42/km^{2} (109.9/sq mi)
- Time zone: UTC+01:00 (CET)
  - Summer (DST): UTC+02:00 (CEST)
- Postal codes: 99947
- Dialling codes: 036254
- Website: www.behringen.de

Behringen is a former municipality in the Wartburgkreis district of Thuringia, Germany. Since 1 December 2007, it is part of the municipality Hörselberg-Hainich.
