= Tankred Schipanski =

German politician

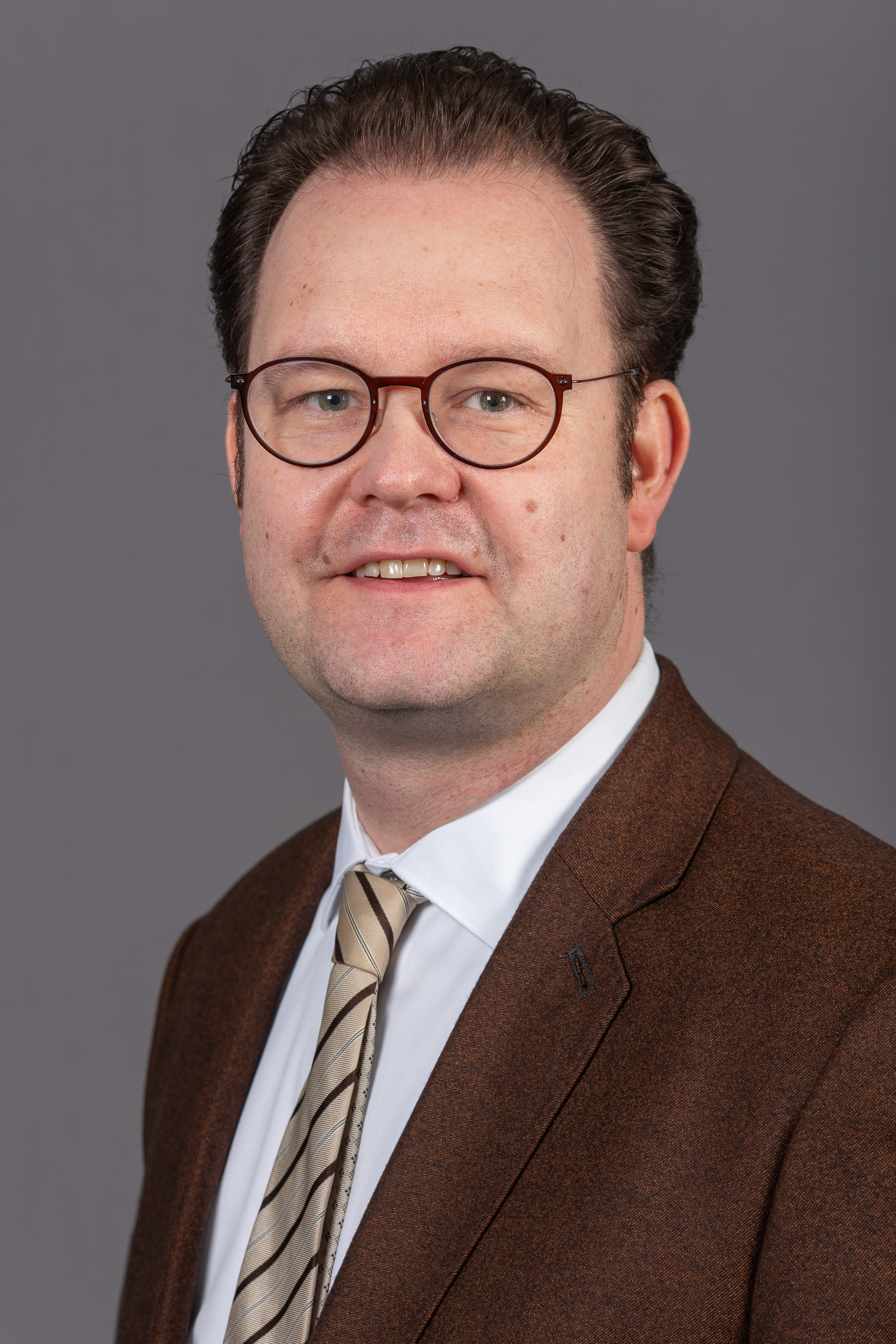
- Schipanski in 2020

Member of the Bundestag
- In office 2009–2021
- Preceded by: Petra Heß
- Succeeded by: Marcus Bühl

Personal details
- Born: 30 December 1976 (age 49) Leipzig, East Germany (now Germany)
- Party: CDU
- Occupation: politician

Tankred Schipanski (born 30 December 1976) is a German politician of the Christian Democratic Union (CDU) who served as a member of the Bundestag from the state of Thuringia from 2009 until 2021.

== Early life and career ==
Born in Leipzig, Saxony, Schipanski is the son of academic and politician Dagmar Schipanski. After completing his military service with the 37th Panzergrenadier Brigade in Bad Salzungen, he studied law at the University of Bayreuth from 1996 until 2002. From 2005 until 2009, he worked at Technische Universität Ilmenau (TU Ilmenau).

== Political career ==
Schipanski first became a member of the Bundestag in the 2009 elections. In parliament, he was a member of the Committee on Education, Research and Technology Assessment and the Committee on the Digital Agenda. From 2018, he also served as his parliamentary group's spokesperson on digital affairs.

In addition to his committee assignments, Schipanski was a substitute member of the German delegation to the Parliamentary Assembly of the Council of Europe (PACE) from 2020, where he serves on the Committee on Culture, Science, Education and Media.

In the negotiations to form a fourth coalition government under Chancellor Angela Merkel following the 2017 federal elections, Schipanski was part of the working group on education policy, led by Annegret Kramp-Karrenbauer, Stefan Müller and Hubertus Heil.

He lost his seat in the 2021 German federal election.

== Life after politics ==
Since 2022, Schipanski has been working as consultant at Deloitte's Berlin office.

== Other activities ==
=== Corporate boards ===
- Rapid Venture Accounting, Member of the Supervisory Board
- SRH Hochschule Berlin, Member of the supervisory board (since 2014)

=== Non-profit organizations ===
- Center of Advanced European Studies and Research (CAESAR), Member of the Foundation Board (since 2010)
- Association of Private Higher Education Institutions (VPH), Member of the Board of Trustees
- Fraunhofer Society, Member of the Senate
- Rotary International, Member

== Political positions ==
In June 2017, Schipanski voted against Germany's introduction of same-sex marriage.

In 2019, Schipanski joined 14 members of his parliamentary group who, in an open letter, called for the party to rally around Angela Merkel and party chairwoman Annegret Kramp-Karrenbauer amid criticism voiced by conservatives Friedrich Merz and Roland Koch.
