= Beringe =

- Village
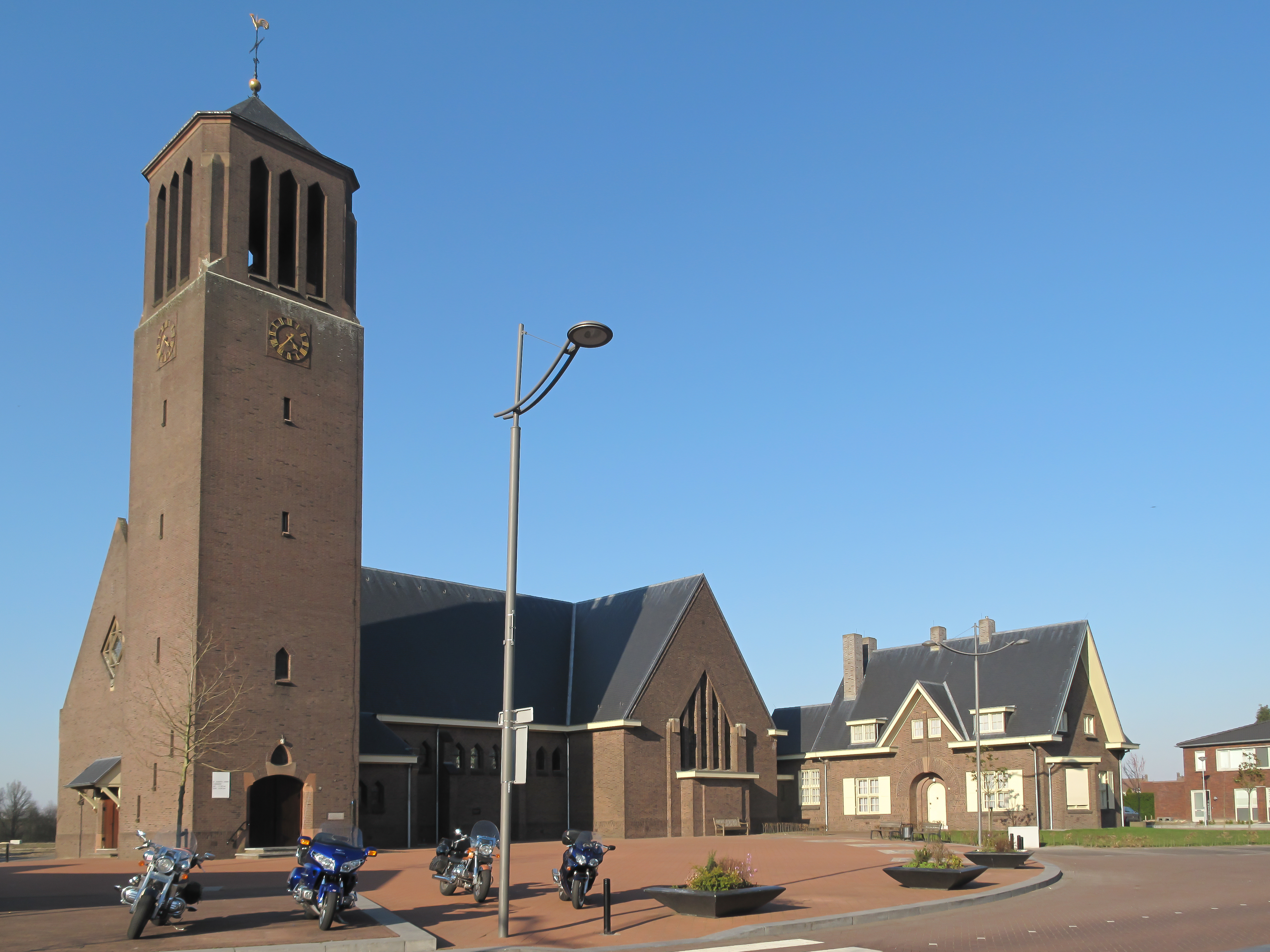
- St Josef Church of Beringe

- Location in the Netherlands Location in the province of Limburg in the Netherlands
- Coordinates: 51°20′9″N 5°56′49″E
- Country: Netherlands
- Province: Limburg
- Municipality: Peel en Maas

Area
  - Total: 6.35 km^{2} (2.45 sq mi)
- Elevation: 35 m (115 ft)

Population (2021)
  - Total: 1,945
  - Density: 306/km^{2} (793/sq mi)
- Time zone: UTC+1 (CET)
  - Summer (DST): UTC+2 (CEST)
- Postal code: 5986
- Dialing code: 077

Beringe (Dutch pronunciation: [ˈbeːrɪŋə]; Limburgish: [ˈbeːʀɪŋə] is a village in the Dutch province of Limburg. It is a part of the municipality of Peel en Maas, and lies about 15 km west of Venlo.

The village was first mentioned in 1447 as to Bieringen, and means "settlement of the people of Bero (person)".

The St Josef Church was built in 1928. On 15 November 1944, the tower was blown up and collapsed on the nave. The church was restored in 1951, and a new tower built in 1952.

Beringe was home to 330 people in 1840.The population in 2021 was 1,945.
