= Birgit Diezel =

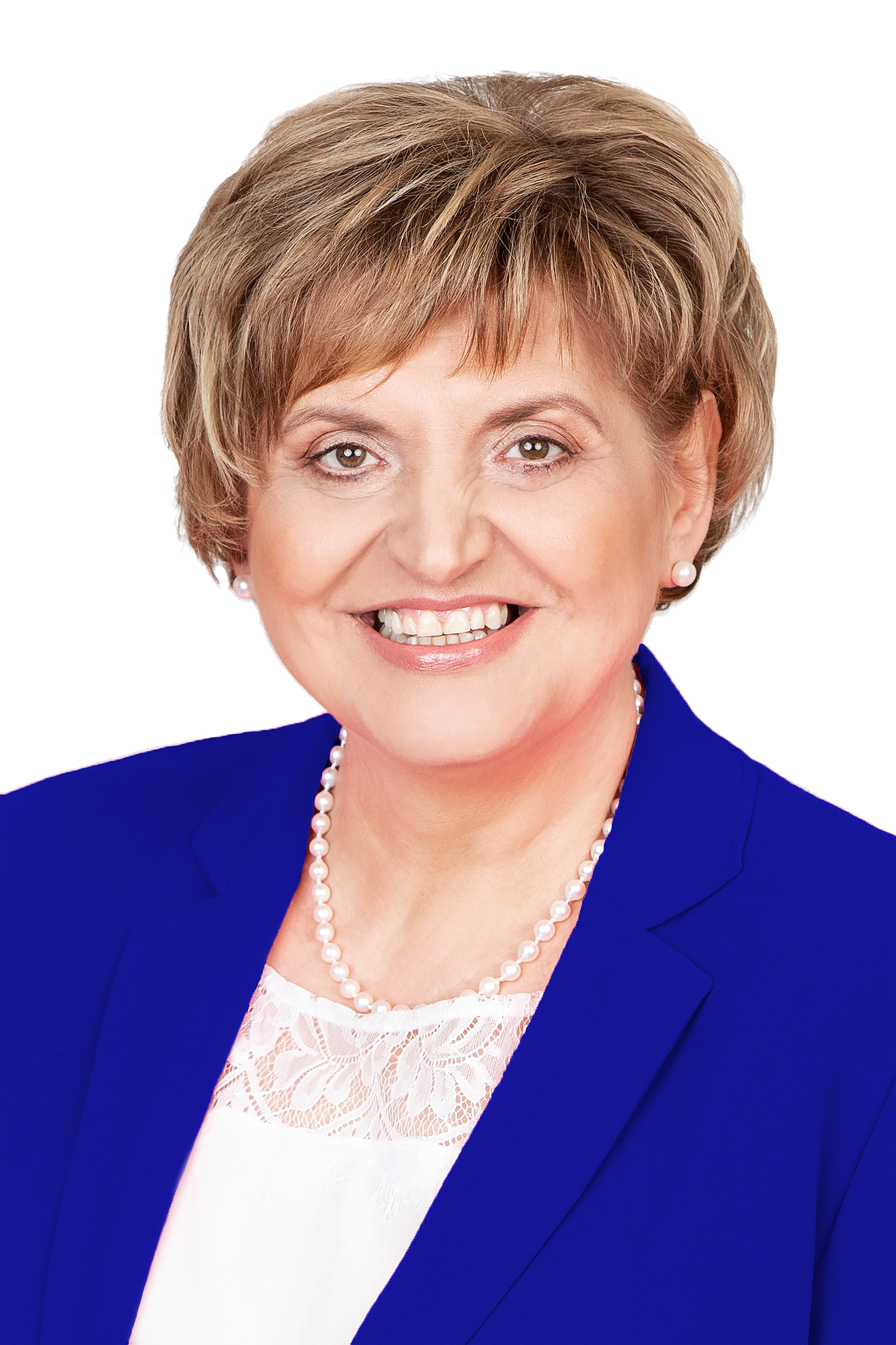
Diezel in 2019

Birgit Irmgard Diezel (born 1958 in Greiz) is a German politician of the Christian Democratic Union who is part of the Landtag of Thuringia since 1994. She served as the Thuringian Ministrix of finance from 2002 to 2004 and was the President of the Landtag two times: from 2009 to 14 and from 2018 to 19 after Christian Carius resigned for personal reasons.

== Early life ==
Diezel was born on February 10th, 1958 in Greiz and grew up in a christian household in Neugernsdorf as the oldest of three siblings. After ten years of school, she trained as a business clerk and worked from 1976 to 1980 as an accountant. She completed her Abitur at a night school in 1978 before studying economy at the Martin-Luther-Universität in Halle.
