= Christian Carius =

German politician and member of the CDU

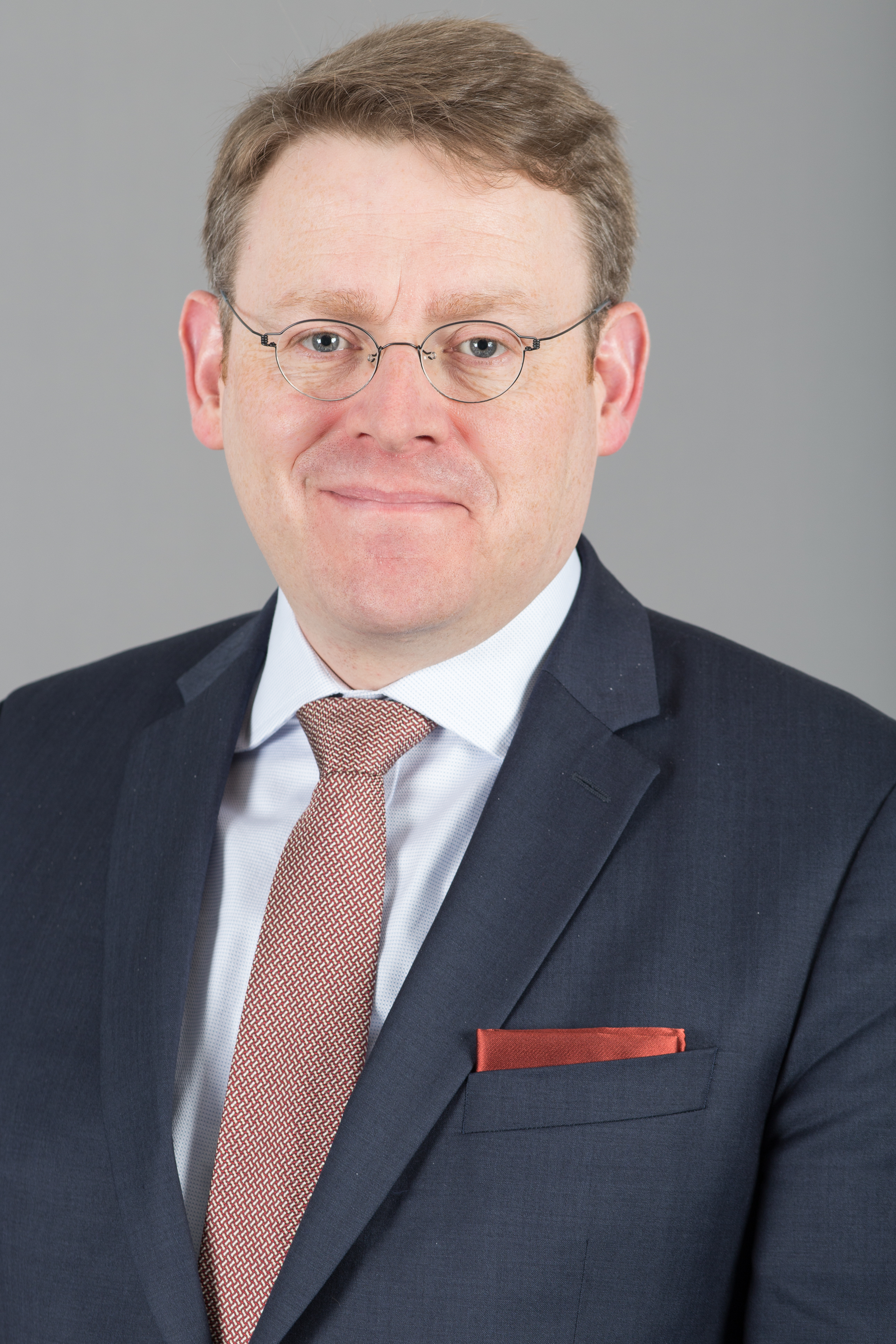
Christian Carius 2016

Christian Carius (born 22 September 1976 in Mühlhausen) is a German lobbyist and former politician.

== Education ==
Carius studied jurisprudence at the University of Jena from 1996 to 2001 but did not finish the degree. From 2001 to 2007 he also studied law, politics and history at the University of Hagen. He completed an MA in political science.

== Political career ==
Carius' political career began in 1995 when he joined the Christian Democratic Union (CDU) and the Association of Christian Democratic Students (RCDS). Since 1999 he has been a member of the Landtag of Thuringia. After the 2009 Thuringia state election he became Minister of Transport, Building and Rural Affairs. Five years later, after the 2014 Thuringian state election he became the president of the state parliament. He was the strongest competitor of Mike Mohring, the CDU party and faction leader.

Carius resigned from his position in October 2018. He announced that he would not seek any elective position during the 2019 state parliament election.

== Private sector ==
Carius became the head of the German Red Cross (DRK) in Thuringia, leading 8,700 volunteers who are involved in water and mountain rescue as well as other social welfare work. He also joined the Mubea group of companies, serving as the head of corporate development and governmental affairs in 2018.
