= List of twin towns and sister cities in Switzerland =

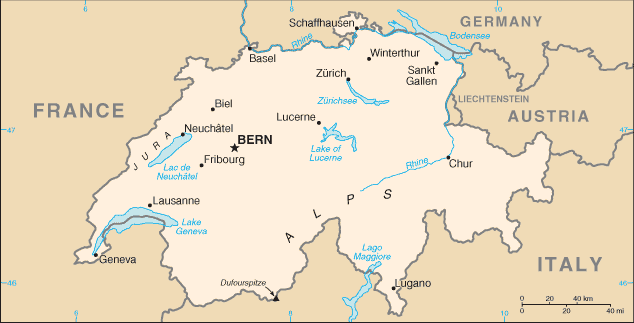
Map of Switzerland

This is a list of municipalities in Switzerland which have standing links to local communities in other countries known as "town twinning" (usually in Europe) or "sister cities" (usually in the rest of the world).

== A ==
Aarau

- Neuchâtel, Switzerland
- Reutlingen, Germany

Acquarossa

- Presidente Franco, Paraguay

Affoltern im Emmental

- Hartmanice, Czech Republic

Aigle

- L'Aigle, France
- Bassersdorf, Switzerland
- Tübingen, Germany

Allschwil

- Blaj, Romania
- Pfullendorf, Germany

Arconciel

- Arconcey, France

Arni

- Pacov, Czech Republic

Assens

- Colombey-les-Deux-Églises, France

Ayent

- Saint-Brevin-les-Pins, France

== B ==
Balgach

- Hard, Austria

Balsthal

- Supraśl, Poland

Basel

- Miami Beach, United States
- Shanghai, China

Bätterkinden

- Mirovice, Czech Republic

Baulmes

- Mont-Saint-Sulpice, France

Beatenberg

- Husinec, Czech Republic

Belp

- Telč, Czech Republic

Beringen

- Behringen (Bispingen), Germany
- Behringen (Hörselberg-Hainich), Germany
- Behringen (Stadtilm), Germany
- Beringe (Peel en Maas), Netherlands
- Beringen, Belgium
- Beringen (Mersch), Luxembourg

Bern does not practice twinning with other cities.

Bex

- Tuttlingen, Germany

Biel/Bienne

- Iserlohn, Germany
- San Marcos, Nicaragua

Biglen

- Černovice, Czech Republic

Bischofszell

- Battaglia Terme, Italy
- Tuttlingen, Germany
- Waidhofen an der Ybbs, Austria

Bolligen

- Diemtigen, Switzerland
- Hluboká nad Vltavou, Czech Republic

Bonstetten

- Bonstetten, Germany

Bottens

- Guéreins, France

Boussens

- Boussens, France

Breitenbach

- Artegna, Italy
- Großbreitenbach, Germany

Brenzikofen

- Vyskytná, Czech Republic

Brienz

- Albula/Alvra, Switzerland
- Shimada, Japan
- Tryavna, Bulgaria

Brig-Glis

- Domodossola, Italy
- Langenthal, Switzerland
- San Jerónimo Norte, Argentina

Brugg

- Rottweil, Germany

Brusino Arsizio

- San José de Metán, Argentina

Bülach

- Santeramo in Colle, Italy

== C ==
Carouge

- Budavár (Budapest), Hungary

Céligny

- Bassi, Burkina Faso

Cham

- Cham, Germany

Champéry

- Esperanza, Argentina
- Llandudno, Wales, United Kingdom

Chardonne

- Barbezieux-Saint-Hilaire, France

La Chaux (Cossonay)

- Saou, France

La Chaux-de-Fonds

- Frameries, Belgium
- Winterthur, Switzerland

Cheseaux-sur-Lausanne

- Aubignan, France

Cheyres-Châbles

- Saint-Martial, France

Chur

- Bad Homburg vor der Höhe, Germany
- Cabourg, France
- Mayrhofen, Austria
- Mondorf-les-Bains, Luxembourg
- Terracina, Italy

Corminboeuf

- Fussy, France

Crans-Montana

- Mandelieu-la-Napoule, France

== D ==
Davos

- Aspen, United States
- Chamonix-Mont-Blanc, France
- Ueda, Japan

Delémont

- Belfort, France
- La Trinidad, Nicaragua

Diemtigen

- Bolligen, Switzerland
- Obersiggenthal, Switzerland
- Veselí nad Lužnicí, Czech Republic

Dietikon

- Kolín, Czech Republic

Dulliken

- Ammerndorf, Germany

Dürnten

- Szentbékkálla, Hungary

== E ==
Echichens

- Saint-Fiacre-sur-Maine, France

Eggiwil

- Nová Včelnice, Czech Republic

Eiken

- Eecke, France
- Eke (Nazareth), Belgium
- Melle, Germany

Evolène

- Châtelaillon-Plage, France

== F ==
Flawil

- Isny im Allgäu, Germany

Forst-Längenbühl

- Dírná, Czech Republic

Frauenfeld

- Kufstein, Germany

Freienstein-Teufen

- Slatiňany, Czech Republic

Fribourg

- Rueil-Malmaison, France

Froideville

- La Pacaudière, France

Füllinsdorf

- Burgkirchen, Austria

== G ==
Geneva does not practice twinning with other cities to keep its neutrality.

Glarus

- Biebrich, Germany

Le Grand-Saconnex

- Carantec, France

Grenchen

- Neckarsulm, Germany
- Sélestat, France

Grindelwald

- Matsumoto, Japan

Grosshöchstetten

- Žirovnice, Czech Republic

Gruyères

- Renaison, France

Gurbrü

- Lhenice, Czech Republic

== H ==
Hausen am Albis

- Letohrad, Czech Republic

Heimberg

- Horažďovice, Czech Republic

Hérémence

- Esperanza, Argentina

Herzogenbuchsee

- Senica, Slovakia

Hilterfingen

- Hersbruck, Germany

Hinwil

- Jablonné nad Orlicí, Czech Republic

Hünenberg

- Banská Štiavnica, Slovakia
- Marly, Switzerland

== I ==
Illnau-Effretikon

- Calanca, Switzerland
- Großbottwar, Germany
- Mont-sur-Rolle, Switzerland
- Orlová, Czech Republic

Interlaken

- Huangshan, China
- Ōtsu, Japan
- Scottsdale, United States
- Třeboň, Czech Republic
- Zeuthen, Germany

== J ==
Jorat-Mézières

- Carrouges, France

== K ==
Kaisten

- Kaisten (Wasserlosen), Germany

Kallnach

- Dolní Bukovsko, Czech Republic
- Nišovice, Czech Republic

Kiesen

- Želiv, Czech Republic

Kirchdorf

- Červená Řečice, Czech Republic

Klingnau

- Sankt Blasien, Germany

Köniz

- Prijepolje, Serbia

Konolfingen

- Počátky, Czech Republic

Krauchthal

- Kamenný Újezd, Czech Republic

Kreuzlingen

- Cisternino, Italy
- Wolfach, Germany

Kriens

- San Damiano d'Asti, Italy

Küsnacht

- Červený Kostelec, Czech Republic

Küssnacht

- Küssaberg, Germany
- Zduny, Poland

== L ==
Lachen

- Schramberg, Germany

Langenthal

- Brig-Glis, Switzerland
- Neviano, Italy

Laufen

- Laufen, Germany

Lausanne

- Akhisar, Turkey
- Bangkok, Thailand
- Osijek, Croatia
- Pernik, Bulgaria

Lengnau, Bern

- Lengnau, Aargau, Switzerland
- Monteroni di Lecce, Italy
- Strakonice, Czech Republic

Liestal

- Onex, Switzerland
- Sacramento, United States
- Waldkirch, Germany

Locarno

- (Georgia (country)) Gagra, Georgia
- Karlovy Vary, Czech Republic
- Lompoc, United States
- Montecatini Terme, Italy
- Urbino, Italy

Le Locle

- Gérardmer, France
- Sidmouth, England, United Kingdom

Lostorf

- Rielasingen-Worblingen, Germany

Lotzwil

- Větřní, Czech Republic

Lucerne

- Bournemouth, England, United Kingdom
- Chicago, United States
- Guebwiller, France
- Murbach, France
- Olomouc, Czech Republic
- Potsdam, Germany

Lugano

- Hangzhou, China

Lützelflüh

- Velike Lašče, Slovenia

Lyss

- Monopoli, Italy

== M ==
Martigny

- Sursee, Switzerland
- Vaison-la-Romaine, France

Meisterschwanden

- Saint-Claude-de-Diray, France

Metzerlen-Mariastein

- Mariastein, Austria

Misery-Courtion

- Voiteur, France

Möhlin

- Zlín, Czech Republic

Monthey

- Diekirch, Luxembourg
- Göd, Hungary
- Ivrea, Italy
- Tübingen, Germany

Montreux

- Menton, France
- Wiesbaden, Germany

Moosseedorf

- Kaçanik, Kosovo

Morcote

- Viarmes, France

Morges

- Rochefort, Belgium
- Vertou, France

Moudon

- Mazan, France

Mühleberg

- Schwanfeld, Germany

Münchenbuchsee

- Landiswil, Switzerland
- Milevsko, Czech Republic

Müntschemier

- Hardheim, Germany

== N ==
Neuchâtel

- Aarau, Switzerland
- Besançon, France
- Sansepolcro, Italy

Nottwil

- Schwaigern, Germany

Nyon

- Nyons, France

== O ==
Oberdiessbach

- Féchy, Switzerland
- Kardašova Řečice, Czech Republic

Oberthal

- Chýnov, Czech Republic

Oberwil

- Aschau im Zillertal, Austria

Oberwil im Simmental

- Čejetice, Czech Republic
- Guggisberg, Switzerland
- Ostermundigen, Switzerland

Olten

- Altenburg, Germany

Onex

- Bandol, France
- Liestal, Switzerland
- Massagno, Switzerland

Oron

- Bussac, France
- Vers-Pont-du-Gard, France

Orpund

- Brtnice, Czech Republic

Ostermundigen

- Löhnberg, Germany
- Oberwil im Simmental, Switzerland

== P ==
Payerne

- Paray-le-Monial, France

Perroy

- Châteauneuf-de-Gadagne, France
- Zofingen, Switzerland

Plaffeien

- Kasterlee, Belgium

Plan-les-Ouates

- Birsfelden, Switzerland
- Sângeorgiu de Pădure, Romania
- Villefranche-sur-Mer, France

Pontresina

- Gaylord, United States

Port

- Holýšov, Czech Republic

Préverenges

- Préveranges, France

Pully

- Obernai, France

== R ==
Rafz

- Hetvehely, Hungary

Rapperswil-Jona

- Aalborg, Denmark
- Bagno di Romagna, Italy

Reigoldswil

- Bad Bellingen, Germany
- Petit-Landau, France

Riddes

- Esperanza, Argentina

Riehen

- Miercurea Ciuc, Romania

Riggisberg

- Myštice, Czech Republic

Risch

- Amaroni, Italy

Roggwil

- Blatná, Czech Republic

Rorbas

- Slatiňany, Czech Republic

Rorschach

- Sopron, Hungary

Rubigen

- Plánice, Czech Republic

Rüthi

- Wolfegg, Germany

== S ==
Saas-Fee

- Rocca di Cambio, Italy
- Steamboat Springs, United States

Saillon

- Barbentane, France

Saint-Martin

- Esperanza, Argentina

Saxon

- Bouliac, France

Schaffhausen

- Dobrich, Bulgaria
- Joinville, Brazil
- Sindelfingen, Germany
- Varaždin, Croatia

Schenkon

- Schenkenzell, Germany

Schöfflisdorf

- Missolonghi, Greece

Schüpfen

- Lišov, Czech Republic

Schwerzenbach

- Aizpute, Latvia

Seftigen

- Kovářov, Czech Republic

Sevelen

- Issum, Germany

Sierre

- Aubenas, France
- Cesenatico, Italy
- Schwarzenbek, Germany
- Zelzate, Belgium

Sigriswil

- Lutry, Switzerland
- Villa General Belgrano, Argentina

Sion

- Colón, Argentina

Sirnach

- Helvécia, Hungary

Solothurn

- Heilbronn, Germany
- Kraków, Poland
- Le Landeron, Switzerland

Soral

- Labeaume, France

Spreitenbach

- Bra, Italy

St. Moritz

- Bariloche, Argentina
- Kutchan, Japan
- Vail, United States

Subingen

- Nueva Helvecia, Uruguay
- Rosario, Uruguay

Suhr

- Castelnuovo Rangone, Italy

Sursee

- Highland, United States
- Martigny, Switzerland

== T ==
Thierachern

- Sezimovo Ústí, Czech Republic

Thun

- Gabrovo, Bulgaria

La Tour-de-Peilz

- Ornans, France

Trient

- Esperanza, Argentina

Trimmis

- Weyregg am Attersee, Austria

Trub

- Novosedly nad Nežárkou, Czech Republic

Trubschachen

- Midway, United States
- Strmilov, Czech Republic

Tübach

- Oberteuringen, Germany

Tuggen

- Zell am Harmersbach, Germany

== U ==
Uetendorf

- Sušice, Czech Republic

Urtenen-Schönbühl

- Binn, Switzerland
- Dačice, Czech Republic

Uster

- Prenzlau, Germany

== V ==
Valbirse

- Tar, Hungary

Vétroz

- Beaumont-lès-Valence, France

Vevey

- Carpentras, France
- Müllheim, Germany

Vex

- Esperanza, Argentina

Vucherens

- Droiturier, France

== W ==
Wetzikon

- Badolato, Italy
- Mělník, Czech Republic

Wil

- Dobrzeń Wielki, Poland
- Wangen im Allgäu, Germany

Winterthur

- La Chaux-de-Fonds, Switzerland
- Hall in Tirol, Austria
- Plzeň, Czech Republic
- Yverdon-les-Bains, Switzerland

Wohlen

- Lermoos, Austria

Wünnewil-Flamatt

- Tápiógyörgye, Hungary

== Y ==
Yverdon-les-Bains

- Nogent-sur-Marne, France
- Winterthur, Switzerland

== Z ==
Zermatt

- Alfano, Italy
- Castro Daire, Portugal
- Fujikawaguchiko, Japan
- Lijiang, China
- Myōkō, Japan
- Sexten, Italy

Zollikofen

- Neudörfl, Austria

Zug

- Fürstenfeld, Austria
- Vișeu de Sus, Romania

Zurich

- Kunming, China
- San Francisco, United States

Zweisimmen

- Oberrot, Germany
