= Étagnières =

- Municipality
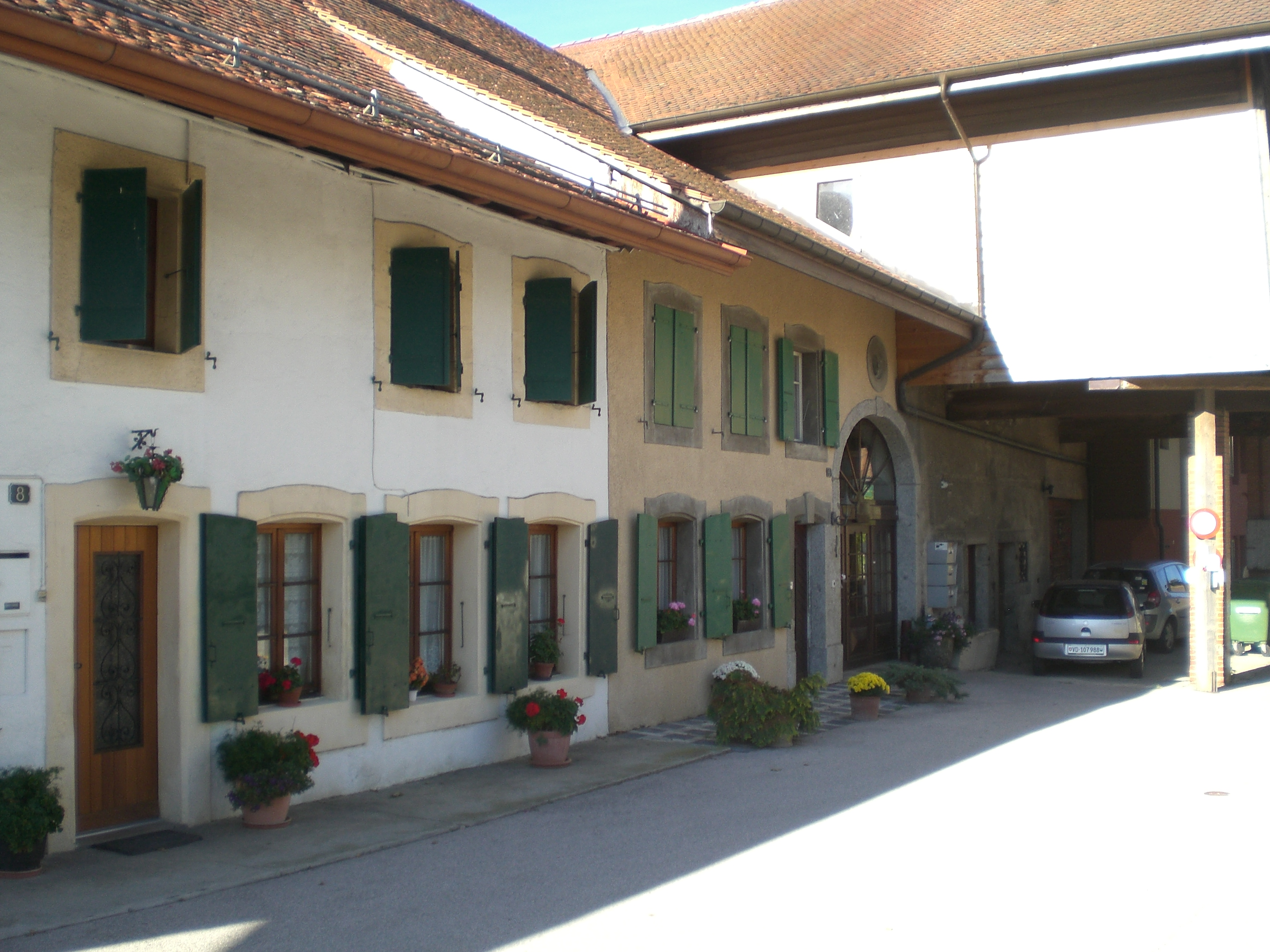
- A farm in Étagnières

- Flag Coat of arms
- Location of Étagnières
- Location within Switzerland Location within Canton of Vaud
- Coordinates: 46°36′N 6°37′E
- Country: Switzerland
- Canton: Vaud
- District: Gros-de-Vaud

Government
  - Mayor: Syndic

Area
  - Total: 3.79 km^{2} (1.46 sq mi)
- Elevation: 628 m (2,060 ft)

Population (December 2004)
  - Total: 813
  - Density: 215/km^{2} (556/sq mi)
- Time zone: UTC+01:00 (CET)
  - Summer (DST): UTC+02:00 (CEST)
- Postal code: 1037
- SFOS number: 5521
- ISO 3166 code: CH-VD
- Surrounded by: Assens, Bioley-Orjulaz, Boussens, Cheseaux-sur-Lausanne, Morrens
- Website: etagnieres.ch

Étagnières is a village and municipality in the district of Gros-de-Vaud in the canton of Vaud in Switzerland.

== History ==
Étagnières is first mentioned in 1202 as Etanneres. A Roman-era forge has been excavated at the village.

The railway reached Étagnières in 1874, with the opening of the Chemin de fer Lausanne-Échallens between Lausanne and Échallens.

The municipality was part of the district of Échallens until that district was dissolved on 31 August 2006, and Étagnières became part of the new district of Gros-de-Vaud.

== Geography ==
Étagnières lies some 9 kilometres (5.6 mi) north of the centre of the city of Lausanne and 9.5 kilometres (5.9 mi) north of the shoreline of Lake Geneva. With an elevation of 628 metres (2,060 ft), it is 256 metres (840 ft) higher than the lake. Formerly an agricultural community in the Gros-de-Vaud region, it is now a residential area of the urban agglomeration of Lausanne.

Étagnières has an area, as of 2009, of 3.79 square kilometers (1.46 sq mi). Of this area, 2.8 km^{2} (1.1 sq mi) or 73.9% is used for agricultural purposes, while 0.57 km^{2} (0.22 sq mi) or 15.0% is forested. Of the rest of the land, 0.39 km^{2} (0.15 sq mi) or 10.3% is settled (buildings or roads), 0.01 km^{2} (2.5 acres) or 0.3% is either rivers or lakes.

Of the built up area, industrial buildings made up 1.8% of the total area while housing and buildings made up 5.8% and transportation infrastructure made up 1.6%. Out of the forested land, 13.7% of the total land area is heavily forested and 1.3% is covered with orchards or small clusters of trees. Of the agricultural land, 59.6% is used for growing crops and 13.7% is pastures. All the water in the municipality is flowing water.

== Government ==
=== Politics ===
In the 2007 federal election the most popular party was the SVP which received 29.6% of the vote. The next three most popular parties were the SP (15.97%), the CVP (15.33%) and the Green Party (15.33%). In the federal election, a total of 239 votes were cast, and the voter turnout was 44.2%.

=== Coat of arms ===
The blazon of the municipal coat of arms is Gules, three Bars wavy Or, overall a Raven statant Sable.

== Demographics ==
Étagnières has a population (as of December 2020) of 1,146. As of 2008, 16.6% of the population are resident foreign nationals. Over the last 10 years (1999–2009) the population has changed at a rate of 17.9%. It has changed at a rate of 11.9% due to migration and at a rate of 6.3% due to births and deaths.

Most of the population (as of 2000) speaks French (721 or 90.1%), with German being second most common (20 or 2.5%) and Italian being third (19 or 2.4%). There is 1 person who speaks Romansh.

Of the population in the municipality 172 or about 21.5% were born in Étagnières and lived there in 2000. There were 357 or 44.6% who were born in the same canton, while 117 or 14.6% were born somewhere else in Switzerland, and 140 or 17.5% were born outside of Switzerland.

In 2008 there were 6 live births to Swiss citizens and were 4 deaths of Swiss citizens. Ignoring immigration and emigration, the population of Swiss citizens increased by 2 while the foreign population remained the same. There was 1 Swiss man who emigrated from Switzerland. At the same time, there were 3 non-Swiss men and 4 non-Swiss women who immigrated from another country to Switzerland. The total Swiss population change in 2008 (from all sources, including moves across municipal borders) was an increase of 3 and the non-Swiss population increased by 10 people. This represents a population growth rate of 1.5%.

The age distribution, as of 2009, in Étagnières is; 115 children or 12.5% of the population are between 0 and 9 years old and 128 teenagers or 13.9% are between 10 and 19. Of the adult population, 113 people or 12.3% of the population are between 20 and 29 years old. 143 people or 15.5% are between 30 and 39, 126 people or 13.7% are between 40 and 49, and 118 people or 12.8% are between 50 and 59. The senior population distribution is 103 people or 11.2% of the population are between 60 and 69 years old, 46 people or 5.0% are between 70 and 79, there are 28 people or 3.0% who are between 80 and 89, and there is 1 person who is 90 and older.

As of 2000, there were 332 people who were single and never married in the municipality. There were 398 married individuals, 18 widows or widowers and 52 individuals who are divorced.

As of 2000, there were 307 private households in the municipality, and an average of 2.4 persons per household. There were 94 households that consist of only one person and 23 households with five or more people. Out of a total of 314 households that answered this question, 29.9% were households made up of just one person and there was 1 adult who lived with their parents. Of the rest of the households, there are 85 married couples without children, 112 married couples with children There were 15 single parents with a child or children.

In 2000 there were 78 single family homes (or 54.5% of the total) out of a total of 143 inhabited buildings. There were 32 multi-family buildings (22.4%), along with 25 multi-purpose buildings that were mostly used for housing (17.5%) and 8 other use buildings (commercial or industrial) that also had some housing (5.6%). Of the single family homes 10 were built before 1919, while 8 were built between 1990 and 2000. The greatest number of single family homes (27) were built between 1981 and 1990. The greatest number of multi-family homes (7) were built before 1919 and again between 1981 and 1990

In 2000 there were 324 apartments in the municipality. The most common apartment size was 4 rooms of which there were 77. There were 22 single room apartments and 97 apartments with five or more rooms. Of these apartments, a total of 292 apartments (90.1% of the total) were permanently occupied, while 28 apartments (8.6%) were seasonally occupied and 4 apartments (1.2%) were empty. As of 2009, the construction rate of new housing units was 2.2 new units per 1000 residents. The vacancy rate for the municipality, in 2010, was 0%.

The historical population is given in the following chart:

== Politics ==
In the 2007 federal election the most popular party was the SVP which received 29.6% of the vote. The next three most popular parties were the SP (15.97%), the CVP (15.33%) and the Green Party (15.33%). In the federal election, a total of 239 votes were cast, and the voter turnout was 44.2%.

== Economy ==
As of 2010, Étagnières had an unemployment rate of 3.1%. As of 2008, there were 23 people employed in the primary economic sector and about 7 businesses involved in this sector. 124 people were employed in the secondary sector and there were 11 businesses in this sector. 224 people were employed in the tertiary sector, with 27 businesses in this sector. There were 440 residents of the municipality who were employed in some capacity, of which females made up 39.5% of the workforce.

In 2008 the total number of full-time equivalent jobs was 325. The number of jobs in the primary sector was 16, all of which were in agriculture. The number of jobs in the secondary sector was 115 of which 73 or (63.5%) were in manufacturing and 42 (36.5%) were in construction. The number of jobs in the tertiary sector was 194. In the tertiary sector; 145 or 74.7% were in wholesale or retail sales or the repair of motor vehicles, 5 or 2.6% were in the movement and storage of goods, 9 or 4.6% were in a hotel or restaurant, 12 or 6.2% were the insurance or financial industry, 9 or 4.6% were technical professionals or scientists, .

In 2000, there were 252 workers who commuted into the municipality and 327 workers who commuted away. The municipality is a net exporter of workers, with about 1.3 workers leaving the municipality for every one entering. Of the working population, 13% used public transportation to get to work, and 65.2% used a private car.

== Transport ==
=== Railway ===
The municipality has two railway stations, Etagnières and Les Ripes, on the suburban Lausanne–Bercher line. Both stations provide a service every fifteen minutes between Étagnières and Lausanne, and between Étagnières and Échallens, with every other train continuing from Échallens to Bercher.

=== Road ===
Étagnières is situated on the main road (route 5) that links Lausanne with Échallens, Yverdon, Neuchâtel and points north.

== Religion ==
From the 2000 census, 399 or 49.9% were Roman Catholic, while 267 or 33.4% belonged to the Swiss Reformed Church. Of the rest of the population, there were 3 members of an Orthodox church (or about 0.38% of the population), and there were 14 individuals (or about 1.75% of the population) who belonged to another Christian church. There were 10 (or about 1.25% of the population) who were Islamic. There were 1 individual who belonged to another church. 85 (or about 10.63% of the population) belonged to no church, are agnostic or atheist, and 26 individuals (or about 3.25% of the population) did not answer the question.

== Education ==
In Étagnières about 331 or (41.4%) of the population have completed non-mandatory upper secondary education, and 81 or (10.1%) have completed additional higher education (either university or a Fachhochschule). Of the 81 who completed tertiary schooling, 59.3% were Swiss men, 21.0% were Swiss women, 12.3% were non-Swiss men and 7.4% were non-Swiss women.

In the 2009/2010 school year there were a total of 125 students in the Étagnières school district. In the Vaud cantonal school system, two years of non-obligatory pre-school are provided by the political districts. During the school year, the political district provided pre-school care for a total of 296 children of which 96 children (32.4%) received subsidized pre-school care. The canton's primary school program requires students to attend for four years. There were 64 students in the municipal primary school program. The obligatory lower secondary school program lasts for six years and there were 60 students in those schools. There were also 1 students who were home schooled or attended another non-traditional school.

As of 2000, there were 60 students in Étagnières who came from another municipality, while 100 residents attended schools outside the municipality.
