= Assens, Vaud =

Assens
- Municipality
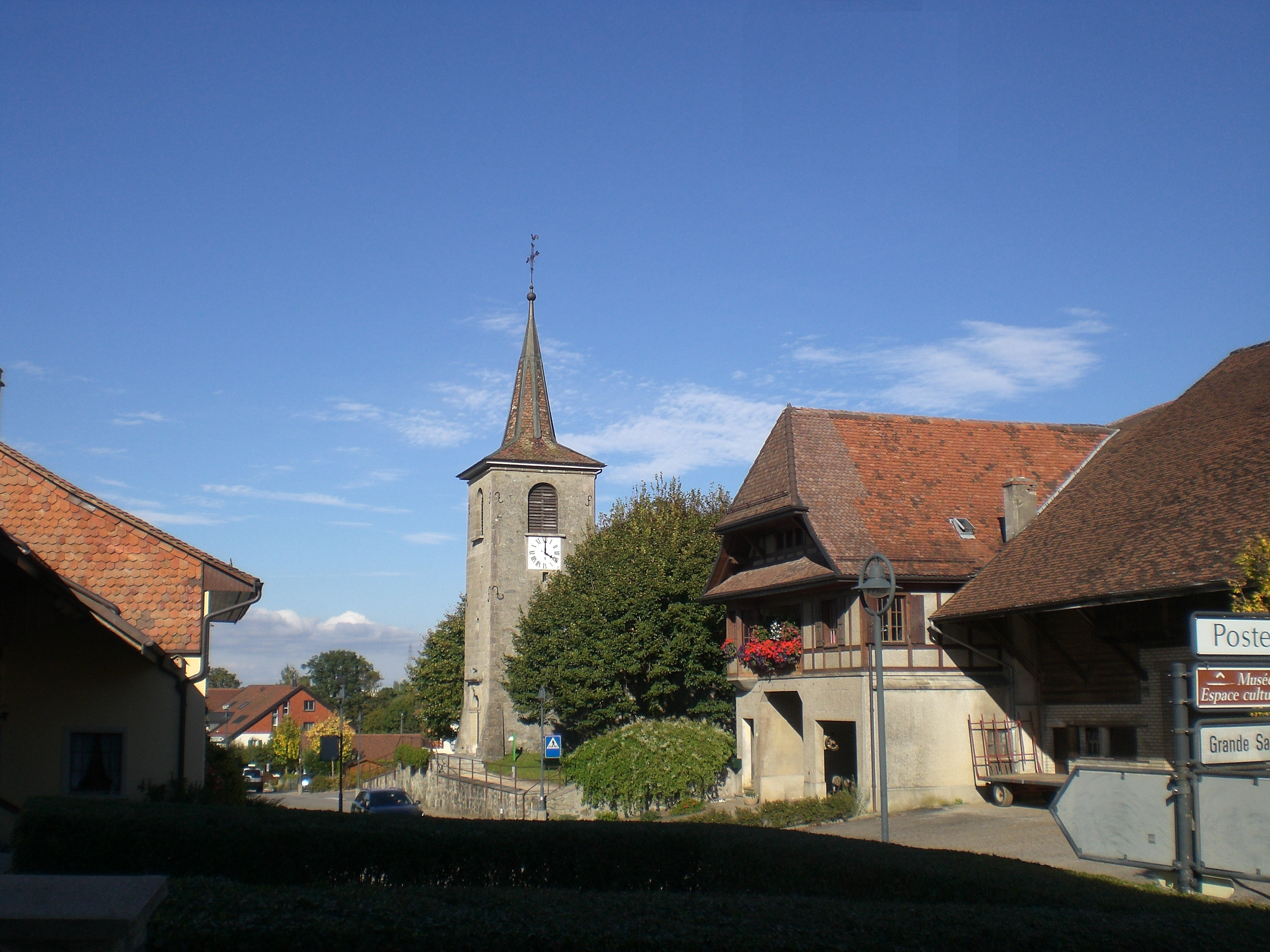

- Flag Coat of arms
- Location of Assens
- Location within Switzerland Location within Canton of Vaud
- Coordinates: 46°37′N 6°37′E
- Country: Switzerland
- Canton: Vaud
- District: Gros-de-Vaud

Government
  - Mayor: Syndic

Area
  - Total: 5.35 km^{2} (2.07 sq mi)
- Elevation: 635 m (2,083 ft)

Population (December 2004)
  - Total: 851
  - Density: 159/km^{2} (412/sq mi)
- Time zone: UTC+01:00 (CET)
  - Summer (DST): UTC+02:00 (CEST)
- Postal code: 1042
- SFOS number: 5511
- ISO 3166 code: CH-VD
- Surrounded by: Bioley-Orjulaz, Bottens, Bretigny-sur-Morrens, Échallens, Étagnières, Malapalud, Morrens, Saint-Barthélemy
- Twin towns: Colombey-les-Deux-Églises (France)
- Website: https://www.assens.ch Profile (in French), SFSO statistics

Assens (French pronunciation: [asɑ̃]) is a village and municipality in the district of Gros-de-Vaud in the canton of Vaud in Switzerland. The municipality includes the villages of Bioley-Orjulaz, Malapalud and Assens.

== History ==
Assens is first mentioned in 1228 as Ascens.

The railway reached Assens in 1874, with the opening of the Chemin de fer Lausanne-Échallens between Lausanne and Échallens.

The municipality was part of the district of Échallens until that district was dissolved on 31 August 2006, and Assens became part of the new district of Gros-de-Vaud. On 1 January 2009, the municipality of Malapalud was merged into Assens. On 1 July 2021 the municipality of Bioley-Orjulaz merged into Assens.

== Geography ==
Assens lies on the Gros-de-Vaud plateau, some 10.5 kilometres (6.5 mi) north of the centre of the city of Lausanne and 3 kilometres (1.9 mi) south of Échallens. It is 11 kilometres (6.8 mi) north of the shoreline of Lake Geneva and, with an elevation of 635 metres (2,083 ft), it is 263 metres (863 ft) higher than the lake. It remained an agricultural village until the 1970s, but has since become a residential area of the urban agglomeration of Lausanne.

The municipality has an area, as of 2009, of 5.35 square kilometers (2.07 sq mi). Of this area, 4.23 km^{2} (1.63 sq mi) or 79.1% is used for agricultural purposes, while 0.59 km^{2} (0.23 sq mi) or 11.0% is forested. Of the rest of the land, 0.48 km^{2} (0.19 sq mi) or 9.0% is settled (buildings or roads), 0.01 km^{2} (2.5 acres) or 0.2% is either rivers or lakes.

Of the built up area, housing and buildings made up 4.7% and transportation infrastructure made up 3.2%. Out of the forested land, all of the forested land area is covered with heavy forests. Of the agricultural land, 66.5% is used for growing crops and 11.0% is pastures, while 1.5% is used for orchards or vine crops. All the water in the municipality is flowing water.

== Government ==
=== Politics ===
In the 2007 federal election the most popular party was the CVP which received 21.18% of the vote. The next three most popular parties were the SVP (20.72%), the SP (16.27%) and the FDP (13.04%). In the federal election, a total of 271 votes were cast, and the voter turnout was 46.3%.

=== Coat of arms ===
The blazon of the municipal coat of arms is Vert, in base a Garb, in chief two Crosses bottony, all of Or.

== Demographics ==
Assens has a population (as of December 2020) of 1,143. As of 2008, 10.3% of the population are resident foreign nationals. Over the last 10 years (1999–2009) the population has changed at a rate of 25.4%. It has changed at a rate of 16.7% due to migration and at a rate of 8.7% due to births and deaths.

Most of the population (as of 2000) speaks French (707 or 91.8%), with German being second most common (36 or 4.7%) and Italian being third (8 or 1.0%).

Of the population in the municipality 215 or about 27.9% were born in Assens and lived there in 2000. There were 319 or 41.4% who were born in the same canton, while 135 or 17.5% were born somewhere else in Switzerland, and 88 or 11.4% were born outside of Switzerland.

In 2008 there were 9 live births to Swiss citizens and were 4 deaths of Swiss citizens. Ignoring immigration and emigration, the population of Swiss citizens increased by 5 while the foreign population remained the same. There were 2 Swiss men who emigrated from Switzerland. At the same time, there were 4 non-Swiss men who immigrated from another country to Switzerland. The total Swiss population change in 2008 (from all sources, including moves across municipal borders) was an increase of 7 and the non-Swiss population remained the same. This represents a population growth rate of 0.8%.

The age distribution, as of 2009, in Assens is; 130 children or 13.0% of the population are between 0 and 9 years old and 132 teenagers or 13.2% are between 10 and 19. Of the adult population, 114 people or 11.4% of the population are between 20 and 29 years old. 141 people or 14.1% are between 30 and 39, 166 people or 16.6% are between 40 and 49, and 127 people or 12.7% are between 50 and 59. The senior population distribution is 104 people or 10.4% of the population are between 60 and 69 years old, 61 people or 6.1% are between 70 and 79, there are 21 people or 2.1% who are between 80 and 89, and there is 1 person who is 90 and older.

As of 2000, there were 319 people who were single and never married in the municipality. There were 395 married individuals, 24 widows or widowers and 32 individuals who are divorced.

As of 2000, there were 303 private households in the municipality, and an average of 2.7 persons per household. There were 51 households that consist of only one person and 29 households with five or more people. Out of a total of 291 households that answered this question, 17.5% were households made up of just one person. Of the rest of the households, there are 100 married couples without children, 111 married couples with children There were 16 single parents with a child or children. There were 3 households that were made up of unrelated people and 10 households that were made up of some sort of institution or another collective housing.

In 2000 there were 121 single family homes (or 65.4% of the total) out of a total of 185 inhabited buildings. There were 29 multi-family buildings (15.7%), along with 25 multi-purpose buildings that were mostly used for housing (13.5%) and 10 other use buildings (commercial or industrial) that also had some housing (5.4%). Of the single family homes 16 were built before 1919, while 17 were built between 1990 and 2000. The greatest number of single family homes (36) were built between 1971 and 1980. The most multi-family homes (7) were built between 1991 and 1995 and the next most (5) were built before 1919. There were 4 multi-family houses built between 1996 and 2000.

In 2000 there were 297 apartments in the municipality. The most common apartment size was 4 rooms of which there were 85. There were 12 single room apartments and 126 apartments with five or more rooms. Of these apartments, a total of 271 apartments (91.2% of the total) were permanently occupied, while 21 apartments (7.1%) were seasonally occupied and 5 apartments (1.7%) were empty. As of 2009, the construction rate of new housing units was 0 new units per 1000 residents. The vacancy rate for the municipality, in 2010, was 0%.

The historical population is given in the following chart:

== Economy ==
As of 2010, Assens had an unemployment rate of 2.4%. As of 2008, there were 45 people employed in the primary economic sector and about 15 businesses involved in this sector. 48 people were employed in the secondary sector and there were 8 businesses in this sector. 169 people were employed in the tertiary sector, with 28 businesses in this sector. There were 426 residents of the municipality who were employed in some capacity, of which females made up 44.1% of the workforce.

In 2008 the total number of full-time equivalent jobs was 202. The number of jobs in the primary sector was 17, all of which were in agriculture. The number of jobs in the secondary sector was 42 of which 8 or (19.0%) were in manufacturing and 34 (81.0%) were in construction. The number of jobs in the tertiary sector was 143. In the tertiary sector; 45 or 31.5% were in wholesale or retail sales or the repair of motor vehicles, 4 or 2.8% were in the movement and storage of goods, 24 or 16.8% were in a hotel or restaurant, 8 or 5.6% were in the information industry, 19 or 13.3% were the insurance or financial industry, 19 or 13.3% were technical professionals or scientists, and 3 or 2.1% were in health care.

In 2000, there were 107 workers who commuted into the municipality and 337 workers who commuted away. The municipality is a net exporter of workers, with about 3.1 workers leaving the municipality for every one entering. Of the working population, 12.9% used public transportation to get to work, and 66% used a private car.

== Transport ==
=== Railway ===
The municipality has a railway station, Assens, on the suburban Lausanne–Bercher line. Trains provide a service every fifteen minutes between Assens and Lausanne, and between Assens and Échallens, with every other train continuing from Échallens to Bercher.

=== Road ===
Assens is situated on the main road (route 5) that links Lausanne with Échallens, Yverdon, Neuchâtel and points north.

== Religion ==
From the 2000 census, 353 or 45.8% were Roman Catholic, while 279 or 36.2% belonged to the Swiss Reformed Church. Of the rest of the population, there were 3 members of an Orthodox church (or about 0.39% of the population), there were 3 individuals (or about 0.39% of the population) who belonged to the Christian Catholic Church, and there were 48 individuals (or about 6.23% of the population) who belonged to another Christian church. There were 2 (or about 0.26% of the population) who were Islamic. There was 1 person who was Buddhist and 2 individuals who belonged to another church. 82 (or about 10.65% of the population) belonged to no church, are agnostic or atheist, and 19 individuals (or about 2.47% of the population) did not answer the question.

== Education ==
In Assens about 318 or (41.3%) of the population have completed non-mandatory upper secondary education, and 105 or (13.6%) have completed additional higher education (either university or a Fachhochschule). Of the 105 who completed tertiary schooling, 63.8% were Swiss men, 22.9% were Swiss women, 7.6% were non-Swiss men and 5.7% were non-Swiss women.

In the 2009/2010 school year there were a total of 142 students in the Assens school district. In the Vaud cantonal school system, two years of non-obligatory pre-school are provided by the political districts. During the school year, the political district provided pre-school care for a total of 296 children of which 96 children (32.4%) received subsidized pre-school care. The canton's primary school program requires students to attend for four years. There were 82 students in the municipal primary school program. The obligatory lower secondary school program lasts for six years and there were 59 students in those schools. There were also 1 students who were home schooled or attended another non-traditional school.

As of 2000, there were 73 students in Assens who came from another municipality, while 102 residents attended schools outside the municipality.
