= Malapalud =

- Former municipality
- Flag Coat of arms
- Location of Malapalud
- Location within Switzerland Location within Canton of Vaud
- Coordinates: 46°38′N 6°37′E
- Country: Switzerland
- Canton: Vaud
- District: Échallens

Area
  - Total: 0.83 km^{2} (0.32 sq mi)
- Elevation: 663 m (2,175 ft)

Population (December 2004)
  - Total: 68
  - Density: 82/km^{2} (210/sq mi)
- Time zone: UTC+01:00 (CET)
  - Summer (DST): UTC+02:00 (CEST)
- Postal code: 1042
- SFOS number: 5526
- ISO 3166 code: CH-VD
- Surrounded by: Assens, Bottens, Échallens
- Website: Profile (in French), SFSO statistics

Malapalud is a village and former municipality in the district of Gros-de-Vaud in the canton of Vaud in Switzerland. The village is now part of the municipality of Assens.

== History ==
Malapalud may have been first mentioned in 1429.

The municipality of Malapalud was part of the district of Echallens until that district was dissolved on 31 August 2006, and it became part of the new district of Gros-de-Vaud. On 1 January 2009, the municipality was merged into the municipality of Assens.

== Geography ==
Malapalud is situated on the Gros-de-Vaud plateau, some 2 kilometres (1.2 mi) north-east of the village of Assens.

== Government ==
Prior to 2009, the village was a municipality in its own right, but since then it has been part of the municipality of Assens.

=== Politics ===
In the 2007 federal election the most popular party was the CVP which received 44.52% of the vote. The next three most popular parties were the SVP (18.88%), the SP (10.72%) and the FDP (10.26%). In the federal election, a total of 27 votes were cast, and the voter turnout was 62.8%.

=== Coat of arms ===
The blazon of the municipal coat of arms is Azure, three Bars wavy Argent.

== Demographics ==
In 2004, prior to its abolition, the municipality of Malapalud had a population of 68.

Most of the population (as of 2000) spoke French (47 or 77.0%), with German being the second most common (9 or 14.8%) and Portuguese being third (4 or 6.6%).

Of the population in the village 29 or about 47.5% were born in Malapalud and lived there in 2000. There were 11 or 18.0% who were born in the same canton, while 14 or 23.0% were born somewhere else in Switzerland, and 7 or 11.5% were born outside of Switzerland.

In 2008 there were 2 live births to Swiss citizens and 1 death of a Swiss citizen. Ignoring immigration and emigration, the population of Swiss citizens increased by 1 while the foreign population remained the same. There was 1 Swiss man who emigrated from Switzerland. At the same time, there was 1 non-Swiss man who immigrated from another country to Switzerland. The total Swiss population change in 2008 (from all sources, including moves across municipal borders) was an increase of 15 and the non-Swiss population increased by 2 people. This represents a population growth rate of 22.7%.

As of 2000, there were 24 people who were single and never married in the village. There were 34 married individuals, 1 widow or widower and 2 individuals who are divorced.

There were 5 households that consist of only one person and 4 households with five or more people. Out of a total of 22 households that answered this question, 22.7% were households made up of just one person. Of the rest of the households, there are 8 married couples without children, 9 married couples with children.

In 2000 there were 3 single-family homes (or 21.4% of the total) out of a total of 14 inhabited buildings. There were 5 multi-family buildings (35.7%) and along with 6 multi-purpose buildings that were mostly used for housing (42.9%). Of the single-family homes 0 were built before 1919, while 1 was built between 1990 and 2000. The greatest number of single-family homes (2) were built between 1981 and 1990. The most multi-family homes (3) were built before 1919 and the next most (1) were built between 1919 and 1945.

In 2000 there were 29 apartments in the village. The most common apartment size was 2 rooms of which there were 7. There were 0 single room apartments and 10 apartments with five or more rooms. Of these apartments, a total of 22 apartments (75.9% of the total) were permanently occupied, while 7 apartments (24.1%) were seasonally occupied.

The historical population is given in the following chart:

== Economy ==
There were 30 residents of the village who were employed in some capacity, of which females made up 36.7% of the workforce.

In 2008 the total number of full-time equivalent jobs was 22. The number of jobs in the primary sector was 15, all of which were in agriculture. The number of jobs in the secondary sector was 1, in manufacturing. The number of jobs in the tertiary sector was 6, all in the sale or repair of motor vehicles. In 2000, there were 15 workers who commuted away from the village.

== Religion ==
From the 2000 census, 50 or 82.0% were Roman Catholic, while 6 or 9.8% belonged to the Swiss Reformed Church. 5 (or about 8.20% of the population) belonged to no church, are agnostic or atheist.

== Education ==
In Malapalud about 17 or (27.9%) of the population have completed non-mandatory upper secondary education, and 6 or (9.8%) have completed additional higher education (either University or a Fachhochschule). Of the 6 who completed tertiary schooling, 66.7% were Swiss men, 33.3% were Swiss women.

As of 2000, there were 11 students from Malapalud who attended schools outside the village.
