= Bioley =

Bioley may refer to:

- Bioley-Magnoux, Vaud, Switzerland
- Bioley-Orjulaz, Vaud, Switzerland
