= Boussens, Switzerland =

Boussens
- Municipality
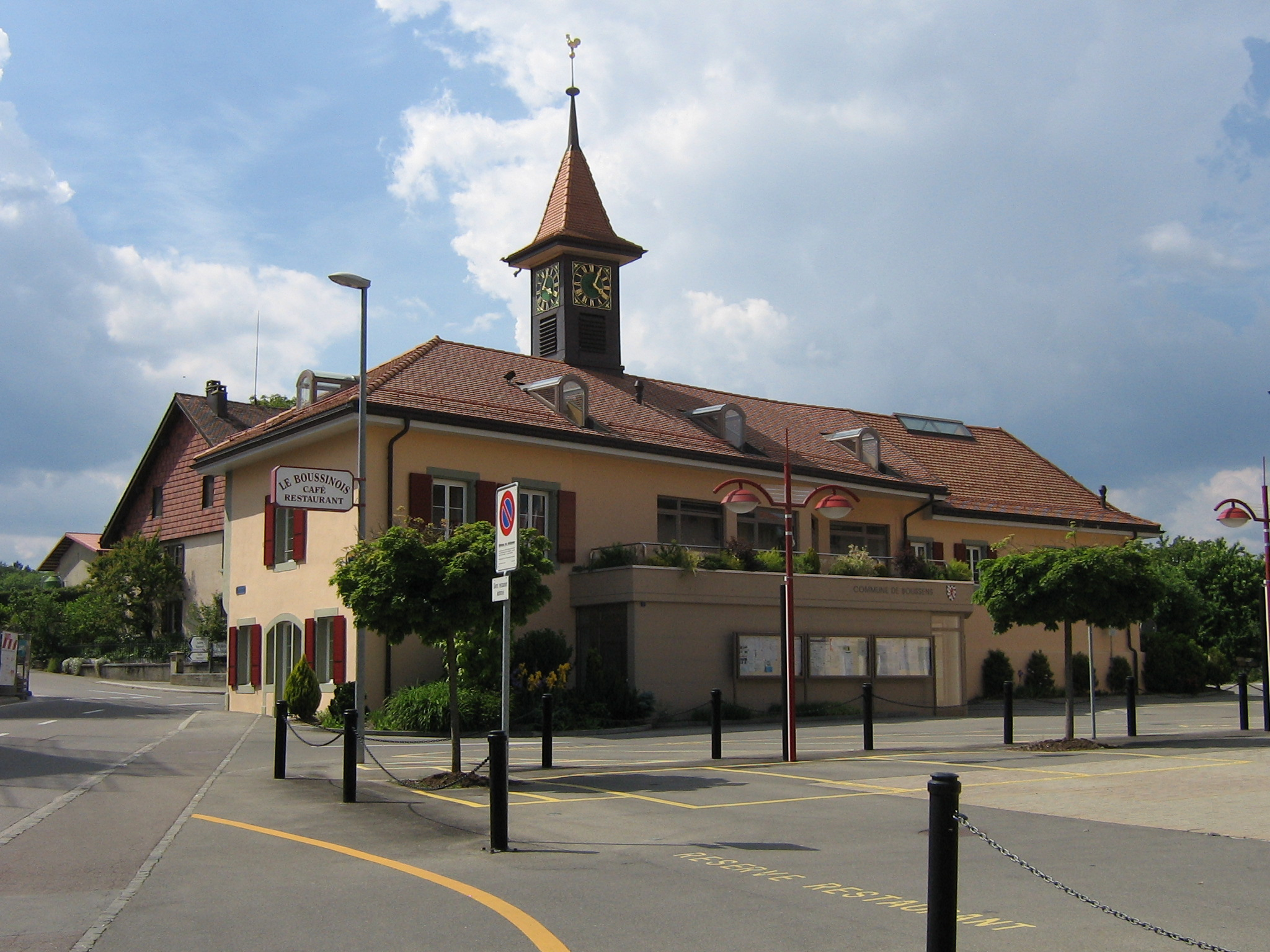

- Flag Coat of arms
- Location of Boussens
- Location within Switzerland Location within Canton of Vaud
- Coordinates: 46°36′N 06°35′E
- Country: Switzerland
- Canton: Vaud
- District: Gros-de-Vaud

Government
  - Mayor: Syndic

Area
  - Total: 3.15 km^{2} (1.22 sq mi)
- Elevation: 594 m (1,949 ft)

Population (2003)
  - Total: 777
  - Density: 247/km^{2} (639/sq mi)
- Time zone: UTC+01:00 (CET)
  - Summer (DST): UTC+02:00 (CEST)
- Postal code: 1034
- SFOS number: 5473
- ISO 3166 code: CH-VD
- Surrounded by: Bettens, Bioley-Orjulaz, Bournens, Cheseaux-sur-Lausanne, Étagnières, Sullens
- Twin towns: Boussens (France)
- Website: http://www.boussens.ch Profile (in French), SFSO statistics

Boussens is a municipality in the district of Gros-de-Vaud in the canton of Vaud in Switzerland.

== History ==
Boussens is first mentioned in 1177 as Bussens.

== Geography ==
Boussens has an area, as of 2009, of 3.15 square kilometers (1.22 sq mi). Of this area, 2.47 km^{2} (0.95 sq mi) or 78.4% is used for agricultural purposes, while 0.42 km^{2} (0.16 sq mi) or 13.3% is forested. Of the rest of the land, 0.29 km^{2} (0.11 sq mi) or 9.2% is settled (buildings or roads).

Of the built up area, housing and buildings made up 6.0% and transportation infrastructure made up 2.5%. Out of the forested land, all of the forested land area is covered with heavy forests. Of the agricultural land, 67.6% is used for growing crops and 9.8% is pastures.

The municipality was part of the Cossonay District until it was dissolved on 31 August 2006, and Boussens became part of the new district of Gros-de-Vaud.

The municipality is located in the southern Gros-de-Vaud area. It consists of the village of Boussens and the hamlets of Chevrine and Grange aux Aguet.

== Coat of arms ==
The blazon of the municipal coat of arms is Argent, a lion rampant Gules, bordered Sable and Argent chequy.

== Demographics ==
Boussens has a population (as of December 2020) of 999. As of 2008, 7.4% of the population are resident foreign nationals. Over the last 10 years (1999–2009 ) the population has changed at a rate of 20.1%. It has changed at a rate of 11.4% due to migration and at a rate of 8.4% due to births and deaths.

Most of the population (as of 2000) speaks French (692 or 93.1%), with German being second most common (23 or 3.1%) and English being third (9 or 1.2%). There are 7 people who speak Italian and 1 person who speaks Romansh.

Of the population in the municipality 124 or about 16.7% were born in Boussens and lived there in 2000. There were 372 or 50.1% who were born in the same canton, while 138 or 18.6% were born somewhere else in Switzerland, and 100 or 13.5% were born outside of Switzerland.

In 2008 there were 10 live births to Swiss citizens and were 7 deaths of Swiss citizens and 1 non-Swiss citizen death. Ignoring immigration and emigration, the population of Swiss citizens increased by 3 while the foreign population decreased by 1. There were 3 Swiss men and 3 Swiss women who immigrated back to Switzerland. At the same time, there were 2 non-Swiss women who immigrated from another country to Switzerland. The total Swiss population change in 2008 (from all sources, including moves across municipal borders) was an increase of 38 and the non-Swiss population increased by 5 people. This represents a population growth rate of 5.7%.

The age distribution, as of 2009, in Boussens is; 106 children or 12.6% of the population are between 0 and 9 years old and 138 teenagers or 16.4% are between 10 and 19. Of the adult population, 78 people or 9.2% of the population are between 20 and 29 years old. 125 people or 14.8% are between 30 and 39, 167 people or 19.8% are between 40 and 49, and 115 people or 13.6% are between 50 and 59. The senior population distribution is 77 people or 9.1% of the population are between 60 and 69 years old, 20 people or 2.4% are between 70 and 79, there are 18 people or 2.1% who are between 80 and 89.

As of 2000, there were 346 people who were single and never married in the municipality. There were 348 married individuals, 18 widows or widowers and 31 individuals who are divorced.

As of 2000, there were 259 private households in the municipality, and an average of 2.8 persons per household. There were 41 households that consist of only one person and 25 households with five or more people. Out of a total of 264 households that answered this question, 15.5% were households made up of just one person and there were 2 adults who lived with their parents. Of the rest of the households, there are 69 married couples without children, 125 married couples with children There were 13 single parents with a child or children. There were 9 households that were made up of unrelated people and 5 households that were made up of some sort of institution or another collective housing.

In 2000 there were 96 single family homes (or 61.5% of the total) out of a total of 156 inhabited buildings. There were 39 multi-family buildings (25.0%), along with 16 multi-purpose buildings that were mostly used for housing (10.3%) and 5 other use buildings (commercial or industrial) that also had some housing (3.2%). Of the single family homes 10 were built before 1919, while 41 were built between 1990 and 2000. The most multi-family homes (11) were built before 1919 and the next most (7) were built between 1991 and 1995. There were 7 multi-family houses built between 1996 and 2000.

In 2000 there were 278 apartments in the municipality. The most common apartment size was 4 rooms of which there were 93. There were 3 single room apartments and 117 apartments with five or more rooms. Of these apartments, a total of 251 apartments (90.3% of the total) were permanently occupied, while 19 apartments (6.8%) were seasonally occupied and 8 apartments (2.9%) were empty. As of 2009, the construction rate of new housing units was 4.7 new units per 1000 residents. The vacancy rate for the municipality, in 2010, was 0%.

The historical population is given in the following chart:

== Politics ==
In the 2007 federal election the most popular party was the SVP which received 26.27% of the vote. The next three most popular parties were the SP (20.6%), the Green Party (13.95%) and the FDP (11.01%). In the federal election, a total of 208 votes were cast, and the voter turnout was 41.8%.

== Economy ==
As of 2010, Boussens had an unemployment rate of 3.4%. As of 2008, there were 18 people employed in the primary economic sector and about 10 businesses involved in this sector. 8 people were employed in the secondary sector and there were 4 businesses in this sector. 150 people were employed in the tertiary sector, with 23 businesses in this sector. There were 396 residents of the municipality who were employed in some capacity, of which females made up 44.7% of the workforce.

In 2008 the total number of full-time equivalent jobs was 153. The number of jobs in the primary sector was 11, all of which were in agriculture. The number of jobs in the secondary sector was 6, all of which were in construction. The number of jobs in the tertiary sector was 136. In the tertiary sector; 52 or 38.2% were in wholesale or retail sales or the repair of motor vehicles, 1 was in the movement and storage of goods, 3 or 2.2% were in a hotel or restaurant, 1 was the insurance or financial industry, 11 or 8.1% were technical professionals or scientists, 7 or 5.1% were in education and 2 or 1.5% were in health care.

In 2000, there were 99 workers who commuted into the municipality and 323 workers who commuted away. The municipality is a net exporter of workers, with about 3.3 workers leaving the municipality for every one entering. Of the working population, 8.6% used public transportation to get to work, and 76% used a private car.

== Religion ==
From the 2000 census, 229 or 30.8% were Roman Catholic, while 346 or 46.6% belonged to the Swiss Reformed Church. Of the rest of the population, there were 5 members of an Orthodox church (or about 0.67% of the population), there was 1 individual who belongs to the Christian Catholic Church, and there were 47 individuals (or about 6.33% of the population) who belonged to another Christian church. There was 1 individual who was Islamic. There were 3 individuals who belonged to another church. 100 (or about 13.46% of the population) belonged to no church, are agnostic or atheist, and 11 individuals (or about 1.48% of the population) did not answer the question.

== Education ==
In Boussens about 287 or (38.6%) of the population have completed non-mandatory upper secondary education, and 125 or (16.8%) have completed additional higher education (either university or a Fachhochschule). Of the 125 who completed tertiary schooling, 54.4% were Swiss men, 29.6% were Swiss women, 9.6% were non-Swiss men and 6.4% were non-Swiss women.

In the 2009/2010 school year there were a total of 133 students in the Boussens school district. In the Vaud cantonal school system, two years of non-obligatory pre-school are provided by the political districts. During the school year, the political district provided pre-school care for a total of 296 children of which 96 children (32.4%) received subsidized pre-school care. The canton's primary school program requires students to attend for four years. There were 68 students in the municipal primary school program. The obligatory lower secondary school program lasts for six years and there were 65 students in those schools.

As of 2000, there were 36 students in Boussens who came from another municipality, while 111 residents attended schools outside the municipality.
