= Bottens =

- Municipality
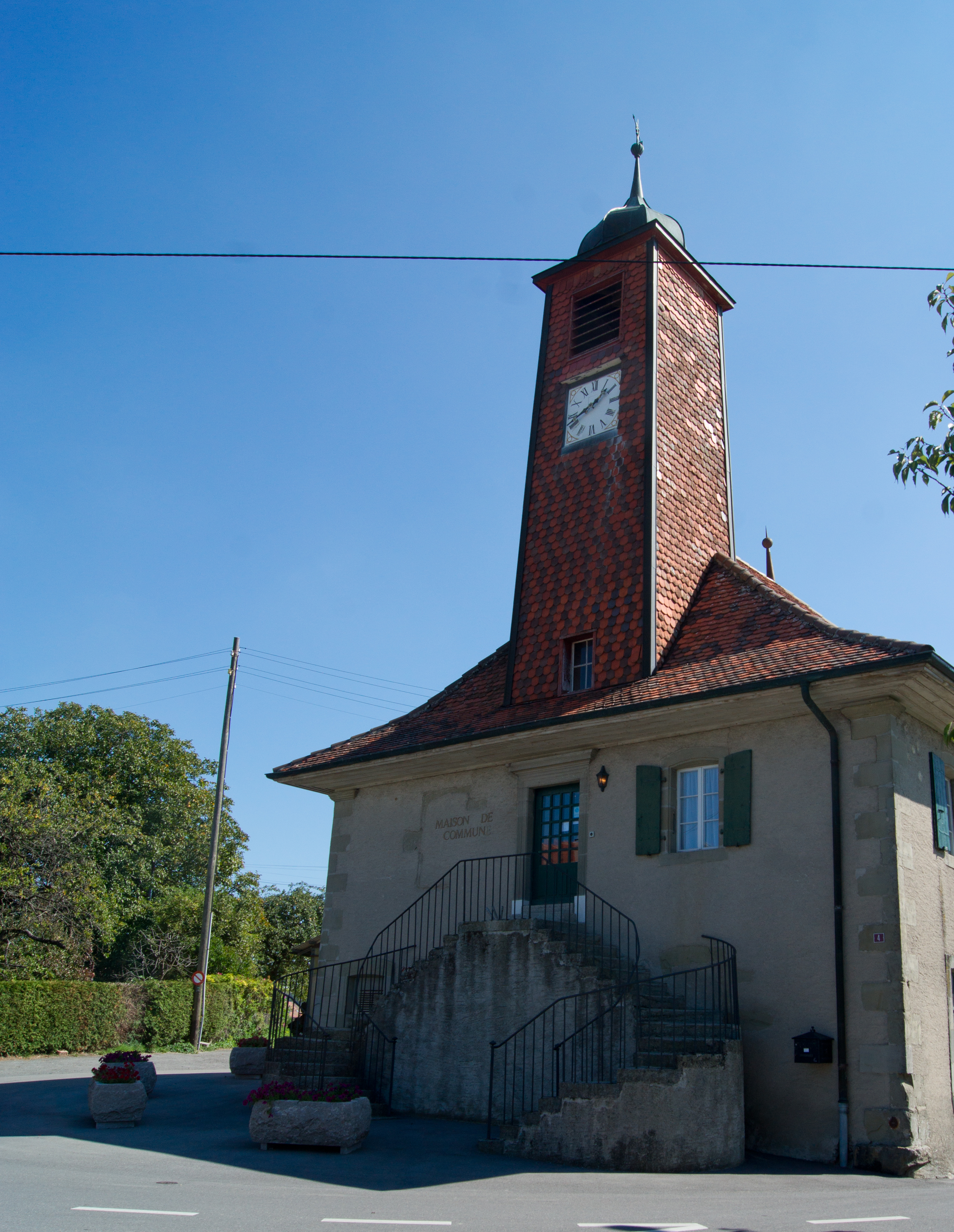
- Bottens town hall

- Flag Coat of arms
- Location of Bottens
- Location within Switzerland Location within Canton of Vaud
- Coordinates: 46°37′N 6°40′E
- Country: Switzerland
- Canton: Vaud
- District: Gros-de-Vaud

Government
  - Mayor: Syndic

Area
  - Total: 6.89 km^{2} (2.66 sq mi)
- Elevation: 730 m (2,400 ft)

Population (December 2004)
  - Total: 1,023
  - Density: 148/km^{2} (385/sq mi)
- Time zone: UTC+01:00 (CET)
  - Summer (DST): UTC+02:00 (CEST)
- Postal code: 1041
- SFOS number: 5514
- ISO 3166 code: CH-VD
- Surrounded by: Assens, Bretigny-sur-Morrens, Echallens, Froideville, Lausanne, Malapalud, Poliez-le-Grand, Poliez-Pittet
- Twin towns: Guéreins (France)
- Website: www.bottens.ch

Bottens is a municipality in the district of Gros-de-Vaud in the canton of Vaud in Switzerland.

== History ==
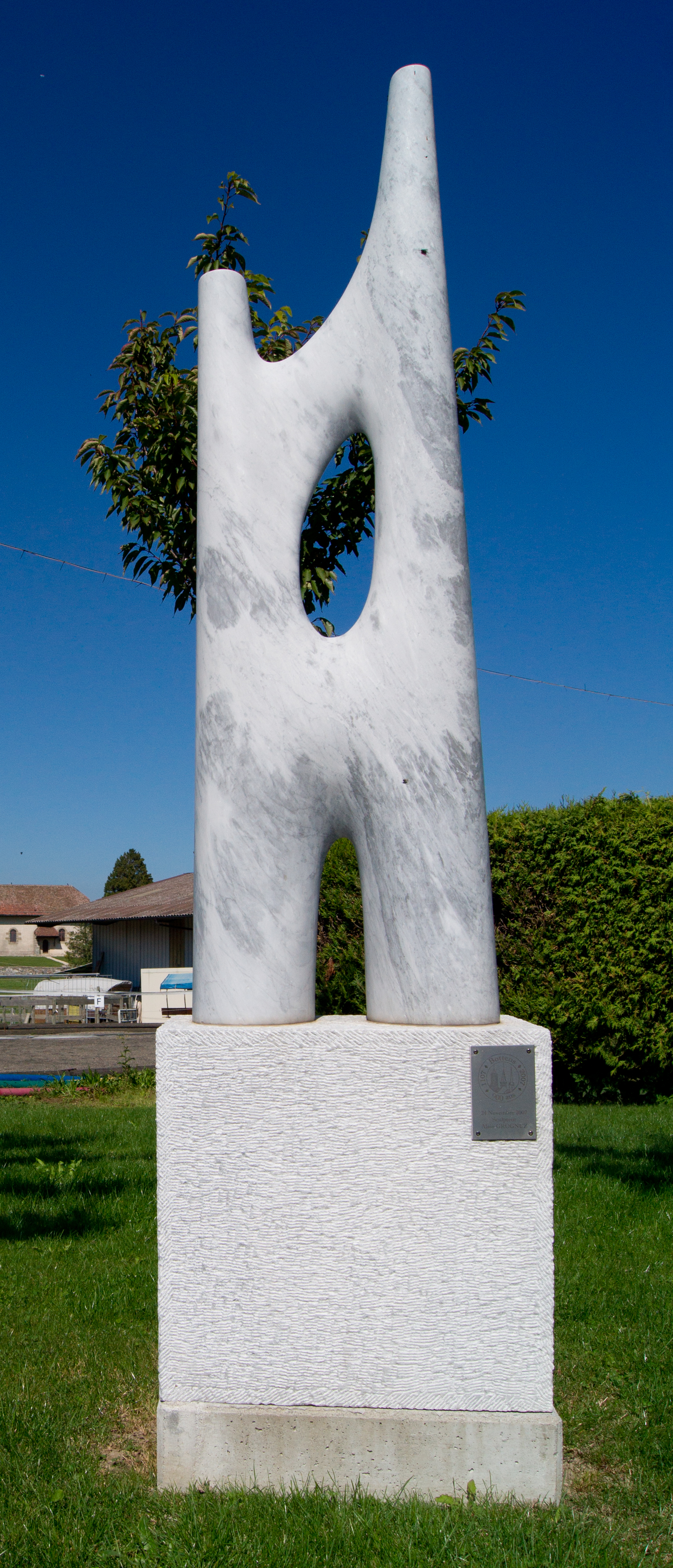
Monument celebrating the history of the Swiss Confederation in Bottens

Bottens is first mentioned in 1142 as Botens.

== Geography ==
Bottens has an area, as of 2009, of 6.89 square kilometers (2.66 sq mi). Of this area, 4.97 km^{2} (1.92 sq mi) or 72.1% is used for agricultural purposes, while 1.4 km^{2} (0.54 sq mi) or 20.3% is forested. Of the rest of the land, 0.53 km^{2} (0.20 sq mi) or 7.7% is settled (buildings or roads) and 0.04 km^{2} (9.9 acres) or 0.6% is unproductive land.

Of the built up area, housing and buildings made up 4.6% and transportation infrastructure made up 2.5%. Out of the forested land, all of the forested land area is covered with heavy forests. Of the agricultural land, 50.8% is used for growing crops and 20.6% is pastures.

The municipality was part of the Echallens District until it was dissolved on 31 August 2006, and Bottens became part of the new district of Gros-de-Vaud.

The municipality is located south-west of Echallens in the Gros-de-Vaud region.

== Coat of arms ==
The blazon of the municipal coat of arms is Gules on a bend Argent a lion Sable.

== Demographics ==
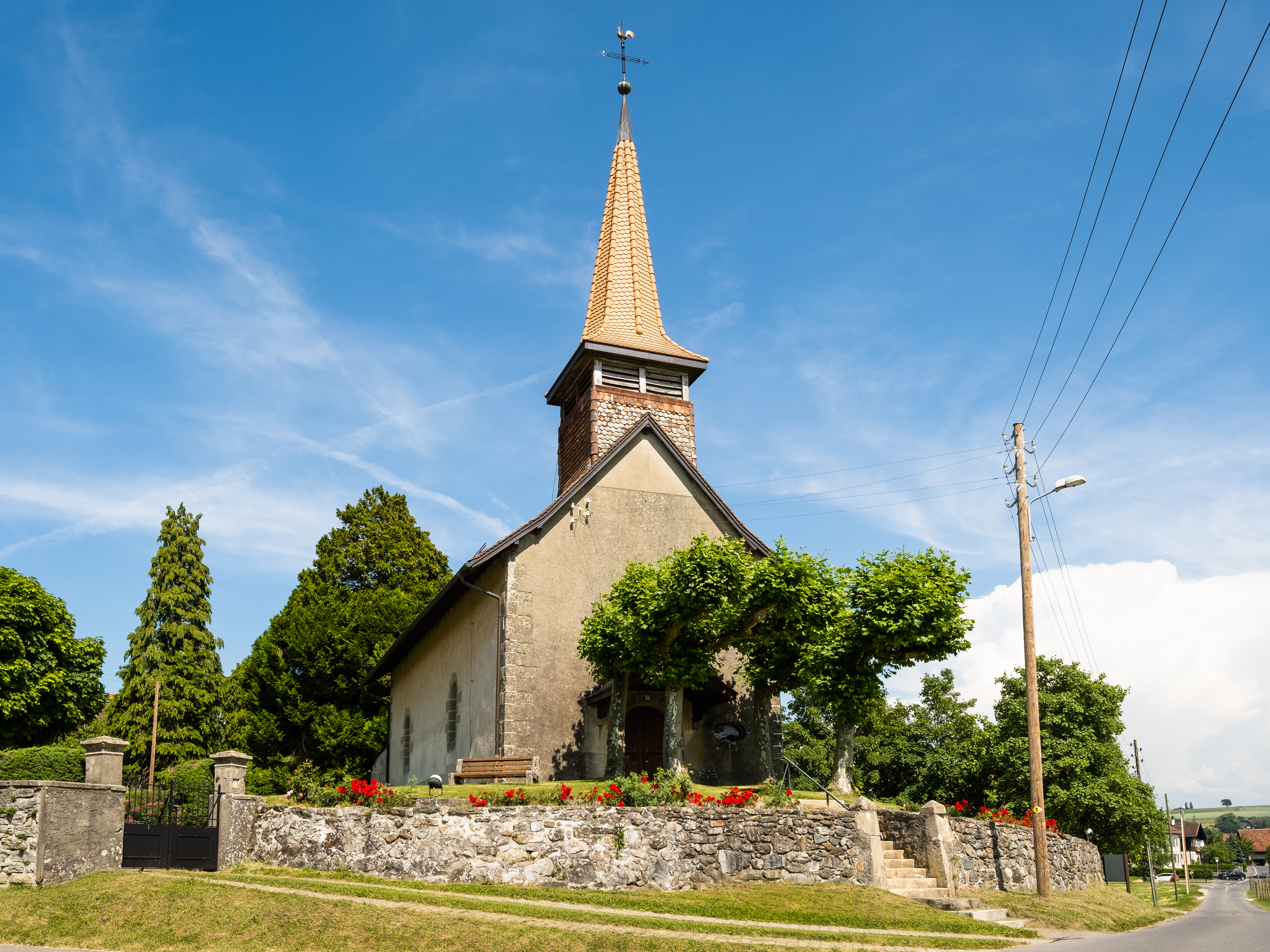
The Protestant church in Bottens

Bottens has a population (as of December 2020) of 1,331. As of 2008, 10.8% of the population are resident foreign nationals. Over the last 10 years (1999–2009) the population has changed at a rate of 17.9%. It has changed at a rate of 12.3% due to migration and at a rate of 6.1% due to births and deaths.

Most of the population (as of 2000) speaks French (853 or 93.0%), with German being second most common (30 or 3.3%) and Portuguese being third (11 or 1.2%). There are 7 people who speak Italian.

Of the population in the municipality 267 or about 29.1% were born in Bottens and lived there in 2000. There were 391 or 42.6% who were born in the same canton, while 136 or 14.8% were born somewhere else in Switzerland, and 102 or 11.1% were born outside of Switzerland.

In 2008 there were 6 live births to Swiss citizens and 2 births to non-Swiss citizens, and in same time span there were 6 deaths of Swiss citizens and 1 non-Swiss citizen death. Ignoring immigration and emigration, the population of Swiss citizens remained the same while the foreign population increased by 1. There was 1 Swiss man who immigrated back to Switzerland. At the same time, there were 3 non-Swiss men and 6 non-Swiss women who immigrated from another country to Switzerland. The total Swiss population change in 2008 (from all sources, including moves across municipal borders) was an increase of 8 and the non-Swiss population increased by 11 people. This represents a population growth rate of 1.9%.

The age distribution, as of 2009, in Bottens is; 114 children or 10.8% of the population are between 0 and 9 years old and 154 teenagers or 14.6% are between 10 and 19. Of the adult population, 121 people or 11.5% of the population are between 20 and 29 years old. 156 people or 14.8% are between 30 and 39, 186 people or 17.6% are between 40 and 49, and 136 people or 12.9% are between 50 and 59. The senior population distribution is 92 people or 8.7% of the population are between 60 and 69 years old, 48 people or 4.5% are between 70 and 79, there are 44 people or 4.2% who are between 80 and 89, and there are 5 people or 0.5% who are 90 and older.

As of 2000, there were 386 people who were single and never married in the municipality. There were 440 married individuals, 42 widows or widowers and 49 individuals who are divorced.

As of 2000, there were 353 private households in the municipality, and an average of 2.6 persons per household. There were 97 households that consist of only one person and 33 households with five or more people. Out of a total of 358 households that answered this question, 27.1% were households made up of just one person and there were 5 adults who lived with their parents. Of the rest of the households, there are 86 married couples without children, 143 married couples with children There were 14 single parents with a child or children. There were 8 households that were made up of unrelated people and 5 households that were made up of some sort of institution or another collective housing.

In 2000 there were 121 single family homes (or 56.0% of the total) out of a total of 216 inhabited buildings. There were 40 multi-family buildings (18.5%), along with 43 multi-purpose buildings that were mostly used for housing (19.9%) and 12 other use buildings (commercial or industrial) that also had some housing (5.6%). Of the single family homes 20 were built before 1919, while 17 were built between 1990 and 2000. The greatest number of single family homes (35) were built between 1981 and 1990. The most multi-family homes (11) were built between 1981 and 1990 and the next most (8) were built before 1919. There were 3 multi-family houses built between 1996 and 2000.

In 2000 there were 351 apartments in the municipality. The most common apartment size was 4 rooms of which there were 110. There were 3 single room apartments and 146 apartments with five or more rooms. Of these apartments, a total of 327 apartments (93.2% of the total) were permanently occupied, while 18 apartments (5.1%) were seasonally occupied and 6 apartments (1.7%) were empty. As of 2009, the construction rate of new housing units was 0.9 new units per 1000 residents. The vacancy rate for the municipality, in 2010, was 0%.

The historical population is given in the following chart:

== Twin Town ==
Bottens is twinned with the town of Guéreins, France.

== Politics ==
In the 2007 federal election the most popular party was the SVP which received 34.28% of the vote. The next three most popular parties were the Green Party (15.95%), the CVP (12.99%) and the FDP (12.11%). In the federal election, a total of 301 votes were cast, and the voter turnout was 43.6%.

== Economy ==
As of 2010, Bottens had an unemployment rate of 3.5%. As of 2008, there were 45 people employed in the primary economic sector and about 19 businesses involved in this sector. 98 people were employed in the secondary sector and there were 15 businesses in this sector. 55 people were employed in the tertiary sector, with 15 businesses in this sector. There were 519 residents of the municipality who were employed in some capacity, of which females made up 41.2% of the workforce.

In 2008 the total number of full-time equivalent jobs was 167. The number of jobs in the primary sector was 37, of which 33 were in agriculture and 4 were in forestry or lumber production. The number of jobs in the secondary sector was 91 of which 6 or (6.6%) were in manufacturing and 85 (93.4%) were in construction. The number of jobs in the tertiary sector was 39. In the tertiary sector; 7 or 17.9% were in wholesale or retail sales or the repair of motor vehicles, 5 or 12.8% were in the movement and storage of goods, 4 or 10.3% were in a hotel or restaurant, 3 or 7.7% were technical professionals or scientists, 10 or 25.6% were in education.

In 2000, there were 82 workers who commuted into the municipality and 390 workers who commuted away. The municipality is a net exporter of workers, with about 4.8 workers leaving the municipality for every one entering. Of the working population, 7.1% used public transportation to get to work, and 72.1% used a private car.

== Religion ==
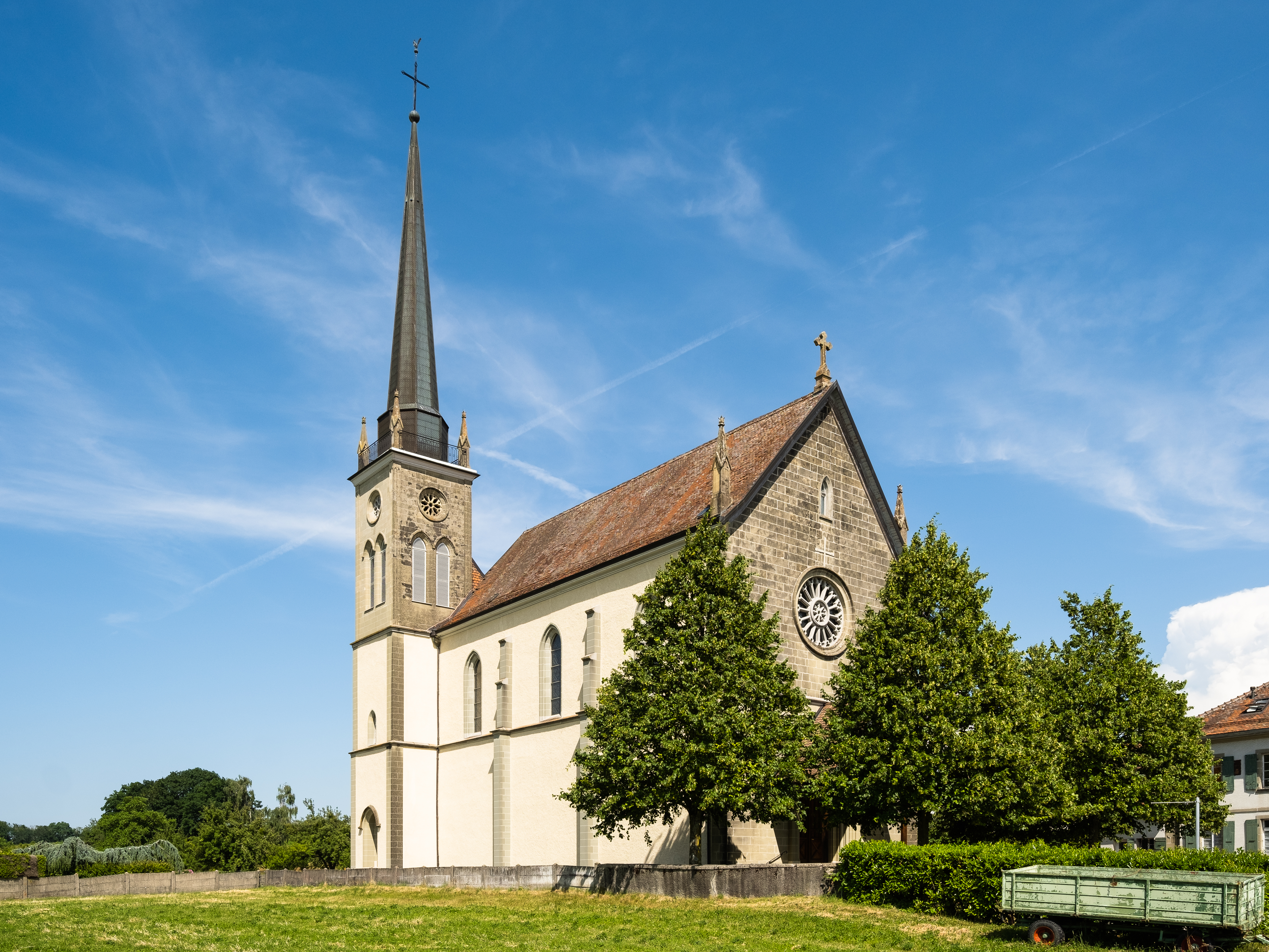
The church of Saint-Etienne

From the 2000 census, 389 or 42.4% were Roman Catholic, while 352 or 38.4% belonged to the Swiss Reformed Church. Of the rest of the population, there were 6 members of an Orthodox church (or about 0.65% of the population), there was 1 individual who belongs to the Christian Catholic Church, and there were 28 individuals (or about 3.05% of the population) who belonged to another Christian church. There were 5 (or about 0.55% of the population) who were Islamic. There were 3 individuals who were Buddhist. 118 (or about 12.87% of the population) belonged to no church, are agnostic or atheist, and 29 individuals (or about 3.16% of the population) did not answer the question.

== Education ==
In Bottens about 383 or (41.8%) of the population have completed non-mandatory upper secondary education, and 115 or (12.5%) have completed additional higher education (either university or a Fachhochschule). Of the 115 who completed tertiary schooling, 63.5% were Swiss men, 29.6% were Swiss women and 4.3% were non-Swiss women.

In the 2009/2010 school year there were a total of 151 students in the Bottens school district. In the Vaud cantonal school system, two years of non-obligatory pre-school are provided by the political districts. During the school year, the political district provided pre-school care for a total of 296 children of which 96 children (32.4%) received subsidized pre-school care. The canton's primary school program requires students to attend for four years. There were 73 students in the municipal primary school program. The obligatory lower secondary school program lasts for six years and there were 76 students in those schools. There were also 2 students who were home schooled or attended another non-traditional school.

As of 2000, there were 17 students in Bottens who came from another municipality, while 102 residents attended schools outside the municipality.
