= Bioley-Orjulaz =

- Former municipality
- Flag Coat of arms
- Location of Bioley-Orjulaz
- Location within Switzerland Location within Canton of Vaud
- Coordinates: 46°37′N 6°36′E
- Country: Switzerland
- Canton: Vaud
- District: Gros-de-Vaud

Government
  - Mayor: Syndic

Area
  - Total: 3.11 km^{2} (1.20 sq mi)
- Elevation: 603 m (1,978 ft)

Population (December 2019)
  - Total: 520
  - Density: 170/km^{2} (430/sq mi)
- Time zone: UTC+01:00 (CET)
  - Summer (DST): UTC+02:00 (CEST)
- Postal code: 1042
- SFOS number: 5513
- ISO 3166 code: CH-VD
- Surrounded by: Assens, Bettens, Boussens, Etagnières, Saint-Barthélemy
- Website: http://bioley-orjulaz.ch/

Bioley-Orjulaz is a village and former municipality in the district of Gros-de-Vaud in the canton of Vaud in Switzerland. The village is now part of the municipality of Assens.

== History ==
Orjulaz is first mentioned in the 12th Century as Oriola. In 1516, Bioley-Orjulaz was mentioned as Biolley orjeux.

The municipality of Bioley-Orjulaz was part of the district of Echallens until that district was dissolved on 31 August 2006, and it became part of the new district of Gros-de-Vaud. On 1 July 2021, the municipality merged into the municipality of Assens.

== Geography ==
Bioley-Orjulaz is situated on the Gros-de-Vaud plateau, some 2 kilometres (1.2 mi) west of the village of Assens.

In 2009, before its abolition, the former municipality had an area, as of 2009, of 3.11 square kilometers (1.20 sq mi). Of this area, 2.19 km^{2} (0.85 sq mi) or 70.4% is used for agricultural purposes, while 0.55 km^{2} (0.21 sq mi) or 17.7% is forested. Of the rest of the land, 0.33 km^{2} (0.13 sq mi) or 10.6% is settled (buildings or roads), 0.02 km^{2} (4.9 acres) or 0.6% is either rivers or lakes and 0.01 km^{2} (2.5 acres) or 0.3% is unproductive land.

Of the built up area, industrial buildings made up 1.9% of the total area while housing and buildings made up 2.9% and transportation infrastructure made up 2.9%. Power and water infrastructure as well as other special developed areas made up 2.9% of the area Out of the forested land, all of the forested land area was covered with heavy forests. Of the agricultural land, 60.1% was used for growing crops and 8.7% was pastures, while 1.6% was used for orchards or vine crops. All the water in the municipality was flowing water.

== Government ==
Prior to 2021, the village was a municipality in its own right, but since then it has been part of the municipality of Assens.

=== Politics ===
In the 2007 federal election the most popular party was the SVP which received 29.51% of the vote. The next three most popular parties were the FDP (22.15%), the Green Party (12.43%) and the CVP (12.07%). In the federal election, a total of 115 votes were cast, and the voter turnout was 47.7%.

=== Coat of arms ===
The blazon of the former municipal coat of arms was Or, on a bend Gules three birch leaves of the first bendwise.

== Demographics ==
In 2008, prior to its abolition, the municipality of Bioley-Orjulaz had a population of 520. At that time, 14.9% of the population were resident foreign nationals. Over the 10 year period from 1999 to 2009, the population changed at a rate of 41.5%. Of this, 37.7% was due to migration and at 4.2% was due to births and deaths.

Most of the population (as of 2000) spoke French (268 or 93.1%), with German being second most common (7 or 2.4%) and Spanish being third (4 or 1.4%). There was 1 person who spoke Italian.

Of the population in the municipality 95 or about 33.0% were born in Bioley-Orjulaz and lived there in 2000. There were 112 or 38.9% who were born in the same canton, while 48 or 16.7% were born somewhere else in Switzerland, and 32 or 11.1% were born outside of Switzerland.

In 2008 there were 7 live births to Swiss citizens and 1 death of a Swiss citizen and 1 non-Swiss citizen death. Ignoring immigration and emigration, the population of Swiss citizens increased by 6 while the foreign population decreased by 1. At the same time, there were 3 non-Swiss men who immigrated from another country to Switzerland. The total Swiss population change in 2008 (from all sources, including moves across municipal borders) was a decrease of 18 and the non-Swiss population increased by 5 people. This represents a population growth rate of -3.8%.

The age distribution, as of 2009, in Bioley-Orjulaz was; 51 children or 12.5% of the population were between 0 and 9 years old and 48 or 11.7% were between 10 and 19. Of the adult population, 50 people or 12.2% of the population were between 20 and 29 years old. 88 people or 21.5% were between 30 and 39, 69 people or 16.9% were between 40 and 49, and 44 people or 10.8% were between 50 and 59. The senior population distribution was 29 people or 7.1% of the population between 60 and 69 years old, 17 people or 4.2% between 70 and 79, 12 people or 2.9% between 80 and 89, and 1 person and older.

As of 2000, there were 110 people who were single and never married in the municipality. There were 153 married individuals, 8 widows or widowers and 17 individuals who were divorced.

As of 2000, there were 112 private households in the municipality, and an average of 2.6 persons per household. There were 26 households that consist of only one person and 5 households with five or more people. Out of a total of 113 households that answered this question, 23.0% were households made up of just one person. Of the rest of the households, there are 34 married couples without children, 46 married couples with children There were 6 single parents with a child or children.

In 2000 there were 34 single family homes (or 49.3% of the total) out of a total of 69 inhabited buildings. There were 17 multi-family buildings (24.6%), along with 10 multi-purpose buildings that were mostly used for housing (14.5%) and 8 other use buildings (commercial or industrial) that also had some housing (11.6%). Of the single family homes 7 were built before 1919, while 4 were built between 1990 and 2000. The greatest number of single family homes (18) were built between 1981 and 1990. The most multi-family homes (8) were built before 1919 and the next most (6) were built between 1981 and 1990. There was 1 multi-family house built between 1996 and 2000.

In 2000 there were 118 apartments in the municipality. The most common apartment size was 4 rooms of which there were 37. There were 5 single room apartments and 38 apartments with five or more rooms. Of these apartments, a total of 110 apartments (93.2% of the total) were permanently occupied, while 8 apartments (6.8%) were seasonally occupied. As of 2009, the construction rate of new housing units was 58.7 new units per 1000 residents. The vacancy rate for the municipality, in 2010, was 0%.

The historical population is given in the following chart:

== Economy ==
As of 2010, Bioley-Orjulaz had an unemployment rate of 4.6%. As of 2008, there were 11 people employed in the primary economic sector and about 5 businesses involved in this sector. 213 people were employed in the secondary sector and there were 10 businesses in this sector. 32 people were employed in the tertiary sector, with 8 businesses in this sector. There were 142 residents of the municipality who were employed in some capacity, of which females made up 42.3% of the workforce.

In 2008 the total number of full-time equivalent jobs was 241. The number of jobs in the primary sector was 9, all of which were in agriculture. The number of jobs in the secondary sector was 207 of which 16 or (7.7%) were in manufacturing and 185 (89.4%) were in construction. The number of jobs in the tertiary sector was 25. In the tertiary sector; 9 or 36.0% were in wholesale or retail sales or the repair of motor vehicles, 12 or 48.0% were in the movement and storage of goods, 1 was in the information industry, 1 was a technical professional or scientist.

In 2000, there were 117 workers who commuted into the municipality and 114 workers who commuted away. The municipality is a net importer of workers, with about 1.0 workers entering the municipality for every one leaving. Of the working population, 6.3% used public transportation to get to work, and 75.4% used a private car.

== Religion ==
From the 2000 census, 91 or 31.6% were Roman Catholic, while 155 or 53.8% belonged to the Swiss Reformed Church. Of the rest of the population, there were 5 members of an Orthodox church (or about 1.74% of the population), and there were 16 individuals (or about 5.56% of the population) who belonged to another Christian church. There were 4 individuals who belonged to another church. 16 (or about 5.56% of the population) belonged to no church, are agnostic or atheist, and 9 individuals (or about 3.13% of the population) did not answer the question.

== Education ==
In Bioley-Orjulaz about 114 or (39.6%) of the population have completed non-mandatory upper secondary education, and 31 or (10.8%) have completed additional higher education (either university or a Fachhochschule). Of the 31 who completed tertiary schooling, 51.6% were Swiss men, 38.7% were Swiss women.

In the 2009/2010 school year there were a total of 55 students in the Bioley-Orjulaz school district. In the Vaud cantonal school system, two years of non-obligatory pre-school are provided by the political districts. During the school year, the political district provided pre-school care for a total of 296 children of which 96 children (32.4%) received subsidized pre-school care. The canton's primary school program requires students to attend for four years. There were 28 students in the municipal primary school program. The obligatory lower secondary school program lasts for six years and there were 26 students in those schools. There were also 1 students who were home schooled or attended another non-traditional school.

As of 2000, there were 14 students in Bioley-Orjulaz who came from another municipality, while 47 residents attended schools outside the municipality.
