= Vyskytná =

- Municipality
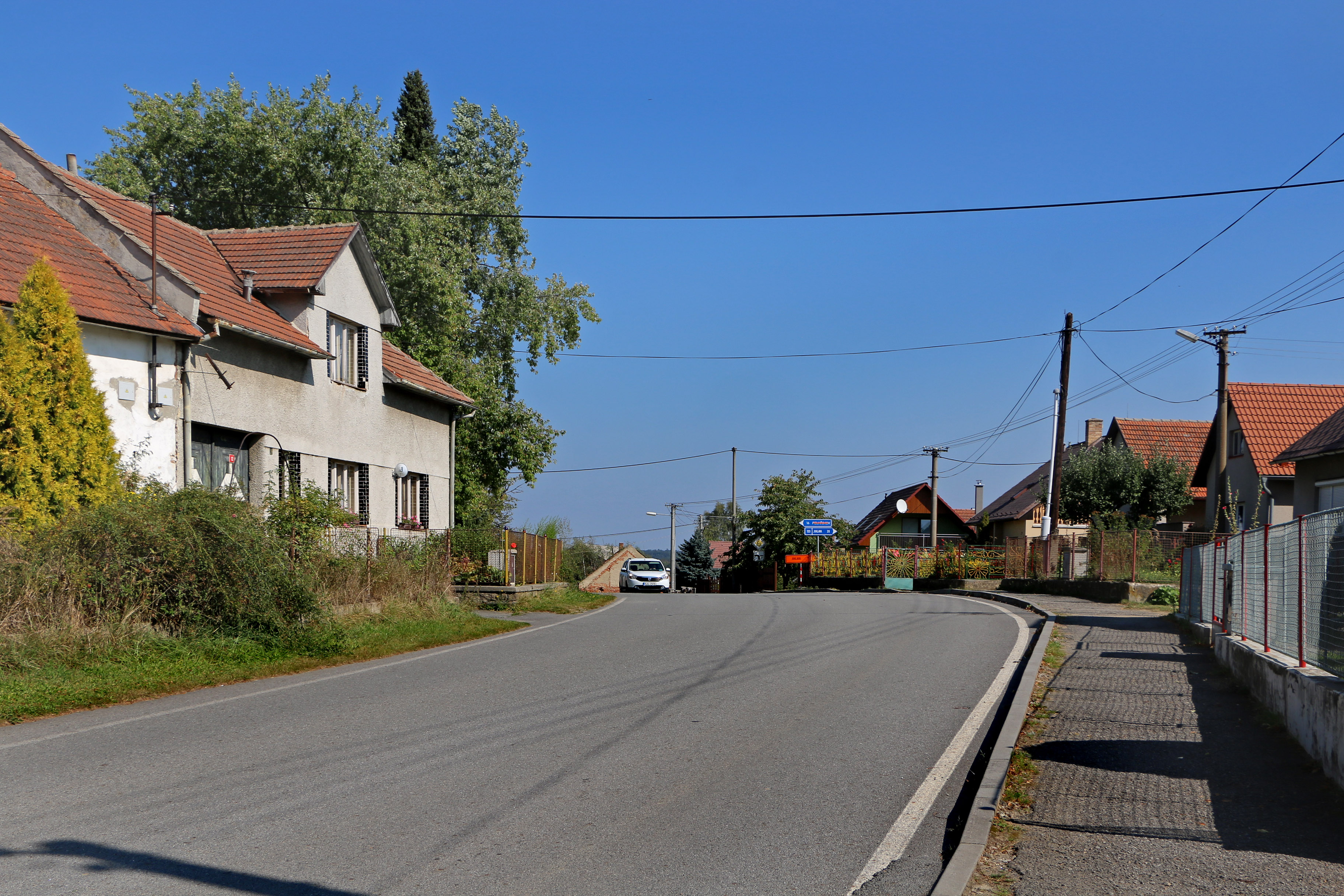
- Main road

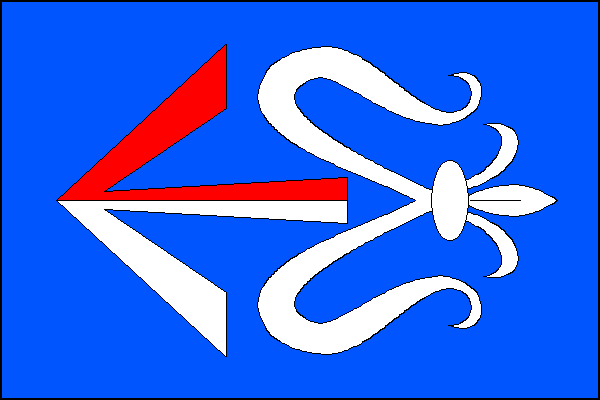
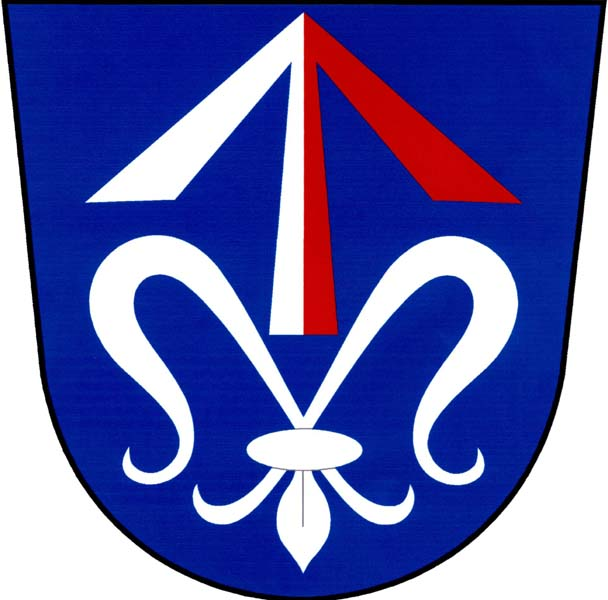
- Flag Coat of arms

- Location in the Czech Republic
- Coordinates: 49°25′42″N 15°21′56″E
- Country: Czech Republic
- Region: Vysočina
- District: Pelhřimov
- First mentioned: 1352

Area
  - Total: 14.69 km^{2} (5.67 sq mi)
- Elevation: 613 m (2,011 ft)

Population (2026-01-01)
  - Total: 707
  - Density: 48.1/km^{2} (125/sq mi)
- Time zone: UTC+1 (CET)
  - Summer (DST): UTC+2 (CEST)
- Postal codes: 393 01, 394 05
- Website: www.vyskytna.cz

Vyskytná (German: Böhmisch Gießhübel) is a municipality and village in Pelhřimov District in the Vysočina Region of the Czech Republic. It has about 700 inhabitants.

== Administrative division ==
Vyskytná consists of three municipal parts (in brackets population according to the 2021 census):

- Vyskytná (572)
- Branišov (48)
- Sedliště (72)

== Etymology ==
Vyskytná was originally the name of the local stream, now known as Jankovický potok. The name has its origin in the Old Czech verb vyskýsti, vyskýtati, which meant 'protrude' and probably referred to tree stumps and stones protruding from the stream.

== Geography ==
Vyskytná is located about 10 kilometres (6 mi) east of Pelhřimov and 16 km (10 mi) west of Jihlava. It lies in the Křemešník Highlands. The highest point is the hill Špeták at 748 m (2,454 ft) above sea level. The stream Jankovský potok originates here and flows along the eastern municipal border.

== History ==
The first written mention of Vyskytná is from 1352. Vyskytná was originally a town, but it was devastated during the Hussite Wars and from 1454, it was referred to as a village. From 1454 until the establishment of an independent municipality in 1850, Vyskytná was owned by the town of Pelhřimov.

== Demographics ==
Historical population

Year	Pop.	±%
1869	1,037	—
1880	1,087	+4.8%
1890	1,060	−2.5%
1900	995	−6.1%
1910	1,033	+3.8%

Year	Pop.	±%
1921	1,052	+1.8%
1930	903	−14.2%
1950	702	−22.3%
1961	715	+1.9%
1970	642	−10.2%

Year	Pop.	±%
1980	618	−3.7%
1991	622	+0.6%
2001	621	−0.2%
2011	685	+10.3%
2021	692	+1.0%

Source: Censuses

== Transport ==
There are no railways or major roads passing through the municipality.

== Sights ==
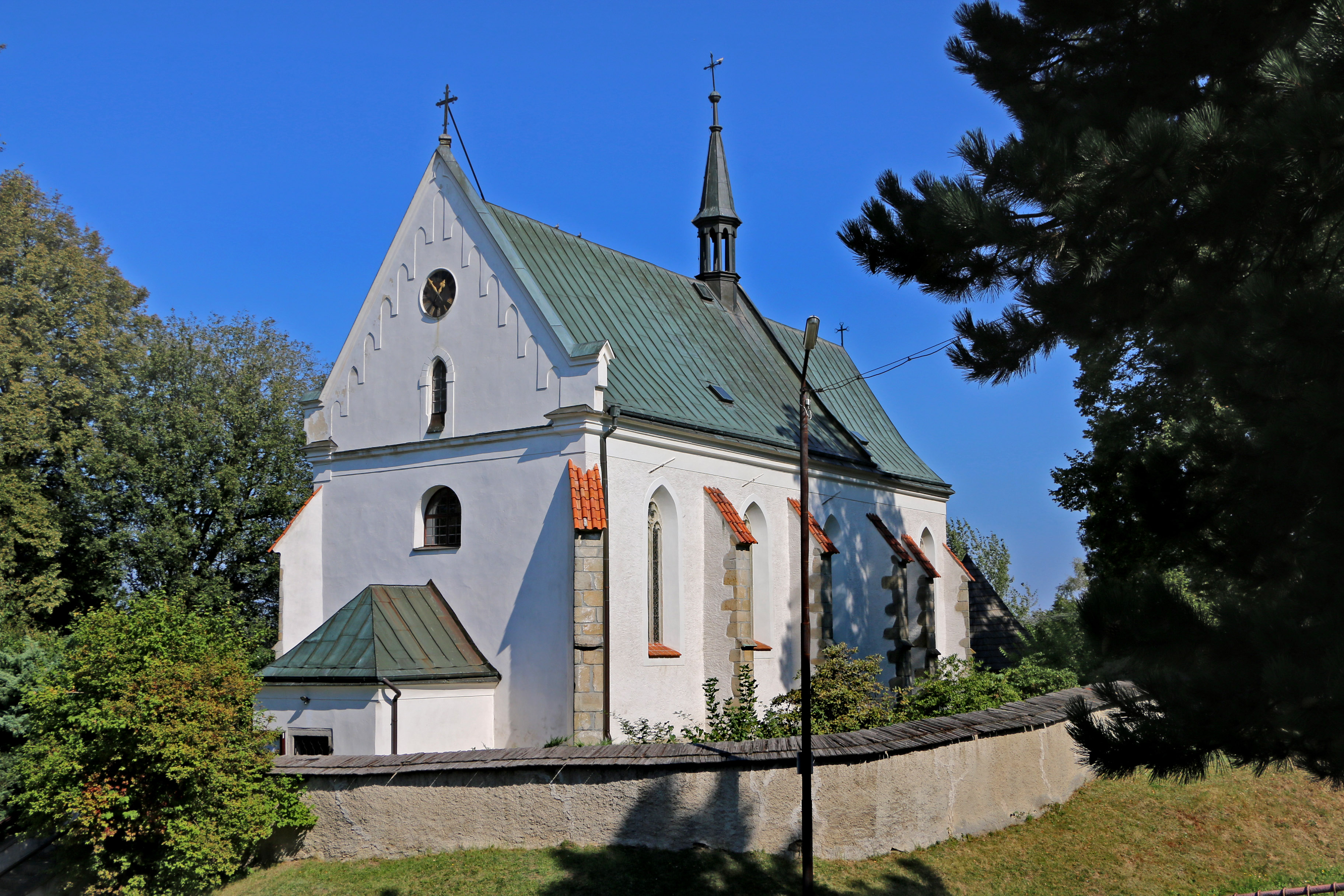
Church of the Name of the Virgin Mary

The main landmark of Vyskytná is the Church of the Name of the Virgin Mary. It was built in the Gothic style in 1290.

A cultural monument is the local wooden bell tower with a stone base. The inner construction for bells dates from the 17th century.
