= Guéreins =

Commune in Auvergne-Rhône-Alpes, France

- Commune
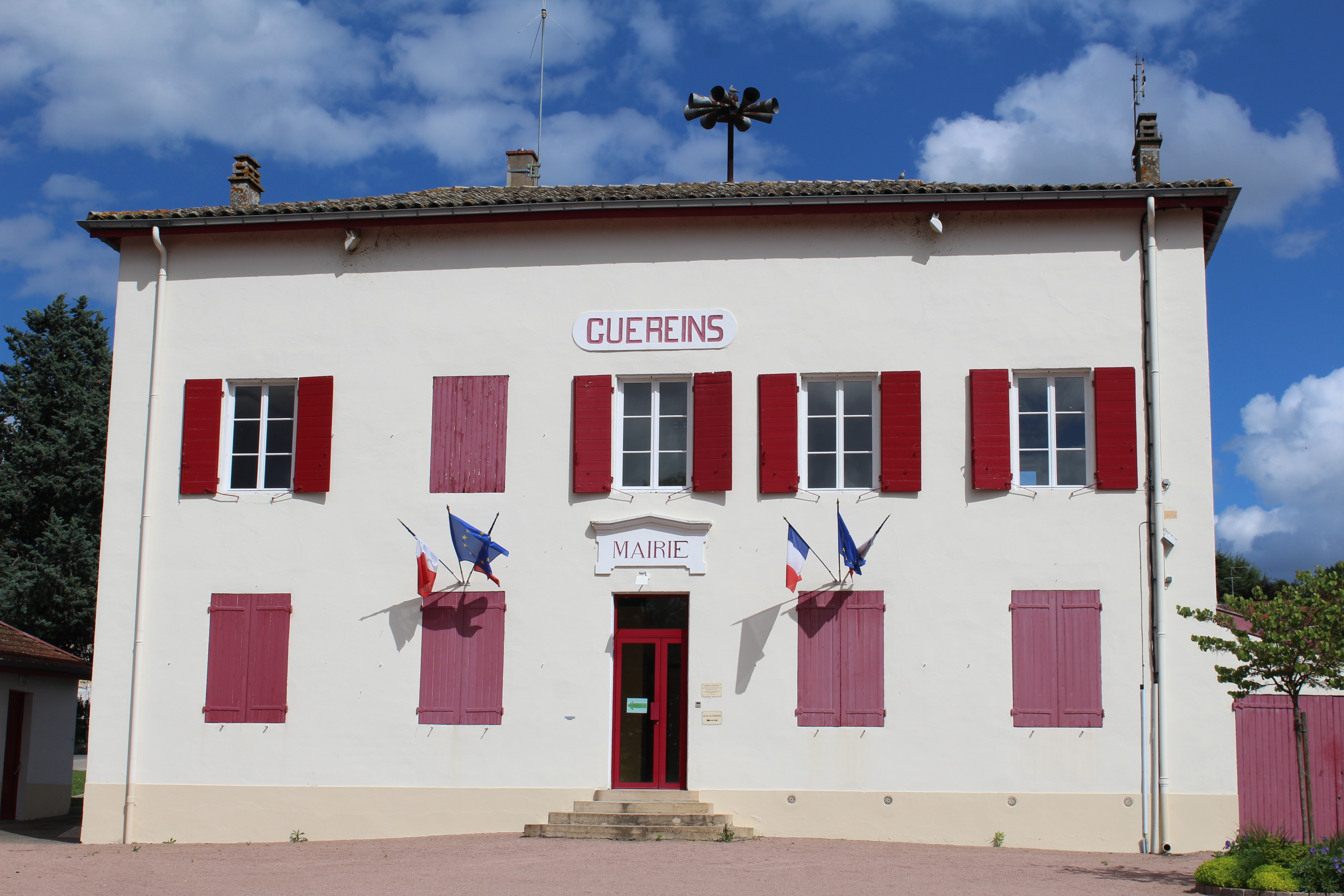
- Town hall
- Location of Guéreins
- Location within France Location within Auvergne-Rhône-Alpes
- Coordinates: 46°06′32″N 4°46′50″E
- Country: France
- Region: Auvergne-Rhône-Alpes
- Department: Ain
- Arrondissement: Bourg-en-Bresse
- Canton: Châtillon-sur-Chalaronne
- Intercommunality: Val de Saône Centre

Government
  - Mayor (2026–32): Jean-Charles Gallo
- Area^{1}: 4.51 km^{2} (1.74 sq mi)
- Highest elevation: 232 m (761 ft)
- Lowest elevation: 169 m (554 ft)
- Population (2023): 1,512
  - Density: 335/km^{2} (868/sq mi)
- Time zone: UTC+01:00 (CET)
  - Summer (DST): UTC+02:00 (CEST)
- INSEE/Postal code: 01183 /01090
- ^{1} French Land Register data, which excludes lakes, ponds, glaciers > 1 km^{2} (0.386 sq mi or 247 acres) and river estuaries.

Guéreins (French pronunciation: [ɡeʁɛ̃]; Arpitan: Guièrrens) is a commune in the Ain department in eastern France.

== Population ==
Historical population
Year	Pop.	±% p.a.
1968	535	—
1975	589	+1.38%
1982	776	+4.02%
1990	995	+3.16%
1999	1,065	+0.76%
2007	1,237	+1.89%
2012	1,388	+2.33%
2017	1,452	+0.91%
2023	1,512	+0.68%
Source: INSEE

== Twin towns ==
Guéreins is twinned with Bottens in Switzerland.

== See also ==
- Communes of the Ain department
