= Nišovice =

- Municipality
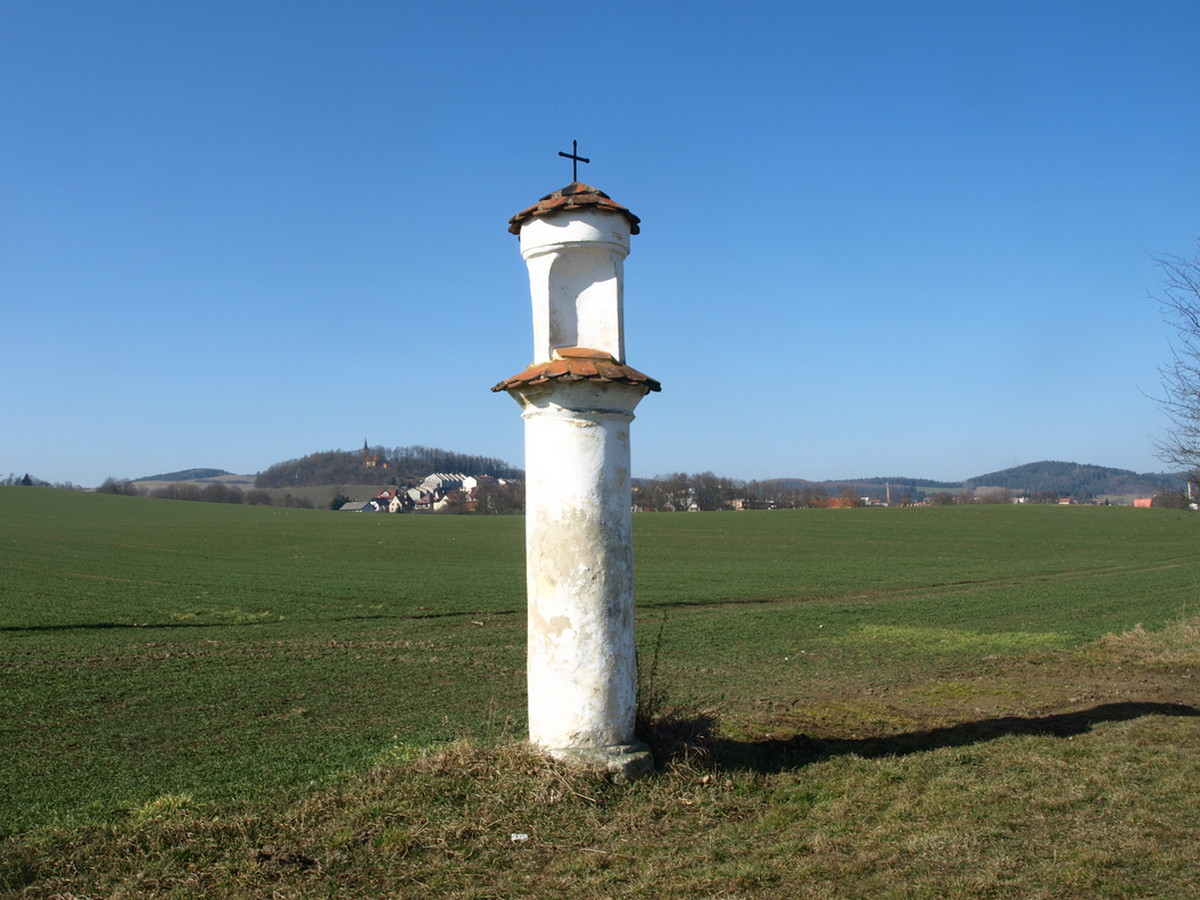
- Column shrine and fields

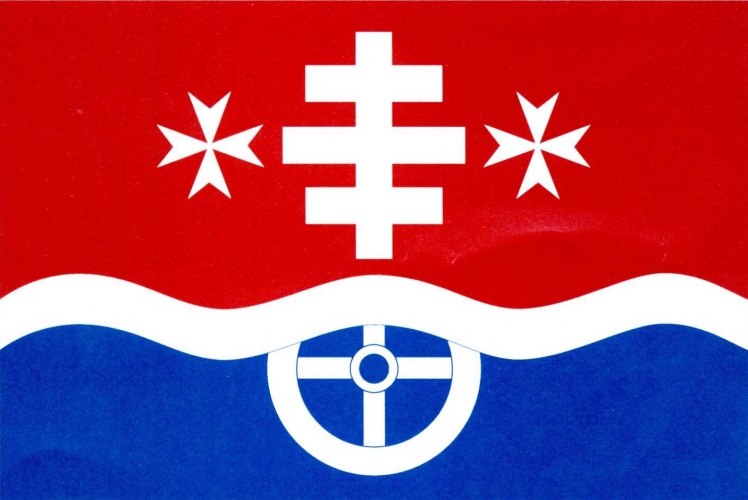
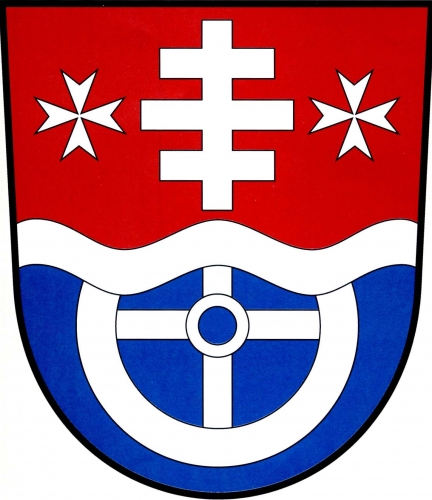
- Flag Coat of arms

- Location in the Czech Republic
- Coordinates: 49°9′19″N 13°53′51″E
- Country: Czech Republic
- Region: South Bohemian
- District: Strakonice
- First mentioned: 1400

Area
  - Total: 6.25 km^{2} (2.41 sq mi)
- Elevation: 463 m (1,519 ft)

Population (2026-01-01)
  - Total: 246
  - Density: 39.4/km^{2} (102/sq mi)
- Time zone: UTC+1 (CET)
  - Summer (DST): UTC+2 (CEST)
- Postal code: 387 01
- Website: www.nisovice.cz

Nišovice is a municipality and village in Strakonice District in the South Bohemian Region of the Czech Republic. It has about 200 inhabitants.

Nišovice lies approximately 12 kilometres (7 mi) south of Strakonice, 47 km (29 mi) north-west of České Budějovice, and 111 km (69 mi) south of Prague.

== Demographics ==
Historical population
Year	Pop.	±%
1869	359	—
1880	432	+20.3%
1890	447	+3.5%
1900	461	+3.1%
1910	417	−9.5%
1921	463	+11.0%
1930	384	−17.1%
1950	295	−23.2%
1961	311	+5.4%
1970	268	−13.8%
1980	223	−16.8%
1991	235	+5.4%
2001	221	−6.0%
2011	240	+8.6%
2021	237	−1.2%
Source: Censuses
