= Échallens =

- Municipality
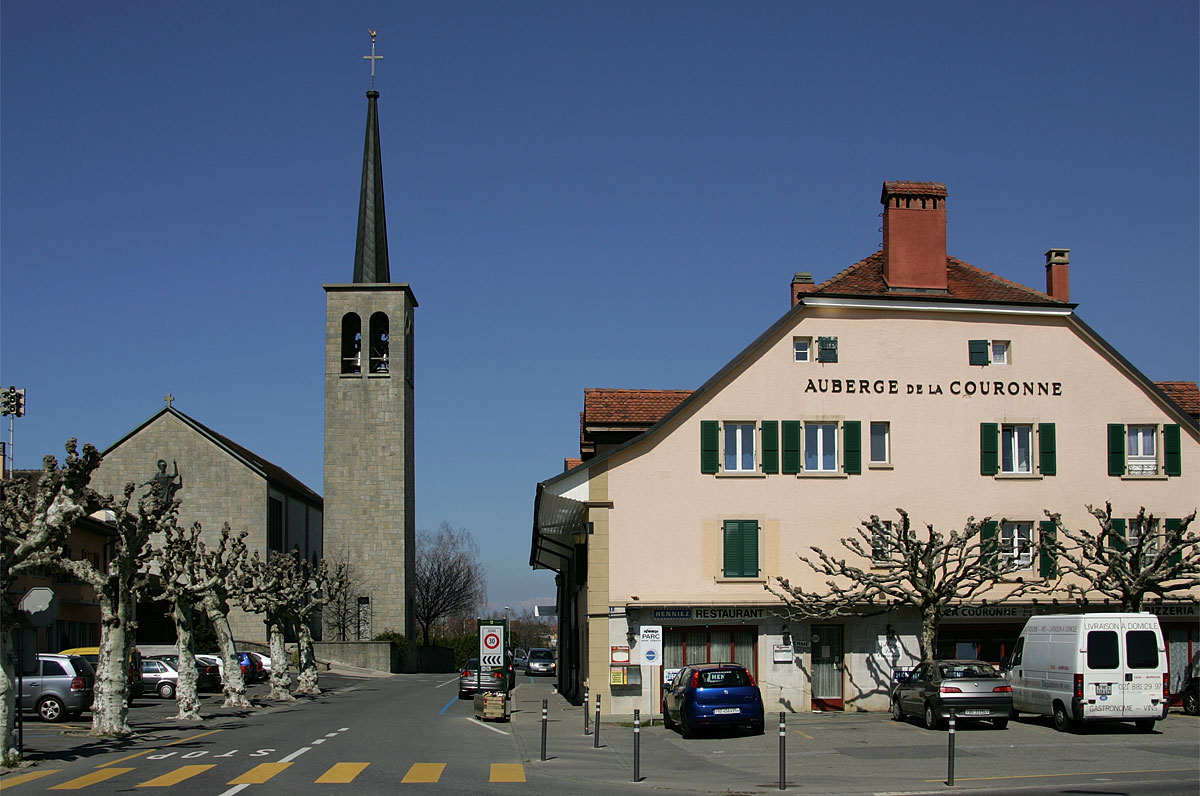

- Flag Coat of arms
- Location of Échallens
- Location within Switzerland Location within Canton of Vaud
- Coordinates: 46°38′N 6°38′E
- Country: Switzerland
- Canton: Vaud
- District: Gros-de-Vaud

Government
  - Mayor: Syndic

Area
  - Total: 6.66 km^{2} (2.57 sq mi)
- Elevation: 617 m (2,024 ft)

Population (December 2004)
  - Total: 4,750
  - Density: 713/km^{2} (1,850/sq mi)
- Time zone: UTC+01:00 (CET)
  - Summer (DST): UTC+02:00 (CEST)
- Postal code: 1040
- SFOS number: 5518
- ISO 3166 code: CH-VD
- Surrounded by: Villars-le-Terroir, Poliez-le-Grand, Bottens, Malapalud, Assens, Saint-Barthélemy, Goumoens-la-Ville.
- Website: www.echallens.ch

Échallens is a municipality in, and the capital of, the district of Gros-de-Vaud in the canton of Vaud in Switzerland.

== History ==
The territory of the municipality was already settled very early. There are remains of a Bronze Age foundry.

The first documentation dates from 1141 under the name of Charlens. Later forms of the name include Challeins, Escharlens (1177), Eschallens (1228), and Eschalleins (1279). The present form of the name first appears in 1315. The name comes from the personal name Charles.

The site belonged originally to the Bishop of Lausanne. At the end of the 12th century, the Burgundian Lords of Montfaucon established the territory of Échallens and built a castle there in the 13th century. In 1317, the rights of the house of Savoy were recognized. In 1350, Échallens was encircled by a wall and received city rights in 1351. From then until the 16th century, a weekly market was held.

In 1410, the government of Échallens passed to the house of Chalon, which originated in Burgundy. For this reason, the Eidgenossen took over after the Burgundian Wars and put it under the administration of Fribourg and Bern in 1476.

Because of the common administration of Catholic Fribourg and Protestant Bern, the Reformation did not gain ground in Échallens, and it remained Catholic.

Échallens belonged from 1798 to 1803 to the canton of Léman in the Helvetic Republic, and was brought into the canton of Vaud by the mediation of Napoleon. It has been the capital of the district since 1798.

The railway reached Échallens in 1874, with the opening of the Chemin de fer Lausanne-Échallens between Lausanne and Échallens. In 1889, a separate company, the Compagnie du Central Vaudois opened their line from Échallens to Bercher. The two companies merged in 1913 to create the Chemin de fer Lausanne-Échallens-Bercher.

Échallens was part of the district of Échallens until that district was dissolved on 31 August 2006, and it then became part of the new district of Gros-de-Vaud.

== Geography ==
Échallens lies at an elevation of 617 m (2,024 ft) 14 km (8.7 mi) north of Lausanne. The municipality stretches across the Gros de Vaud plateau, on both sides of the river Talent, on the northwest edge of the Jorat, in central Vaud.

It includes a section of the rolling Gros de Vaud, the breadbasket of the canton of Vaud. The Talent runs from east to west across the municipality, from the highlands of the Jorat. In the southwest, it runs down to the Mortigue (a tributary of the Talent). The highest point in the municipality is at an elevation of 672 m (2,205 ft) in the municipality woods.

Échallens lies in the middle of its district. The surrounding municipalities are Villars-le-Terroir, Poliez-le-Grand, Bottens, Malapalud, Assens, Saint-Barthélemy, and Goumoens-la-Ville, all in the same district.

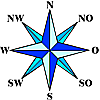
| Goumoens-la-Ville | Villars-le-Terroir | Villars-le-Terroir |
| Saint-Barthélemy | | Poliez-le-Grand |
| Assens | Malapalud | Bottens |

Échallens has an area, as of 2009, of 6.66 square kilometers (2.57 sq mi). Of this area, 4.25 km^{2} (1.64 sq mi) or 63.8% is used for agricultural purposes, while 0.87 km^{2} (0.34 sq mi) or 13.1% is forested. Of the rest of the land, 1.48 km^{2} (0.57 sq mi) or 22.2% is settled (buildings or roads), 0.05 km^{2} (12 acres) or 0.8% is either rivers or lakes and 0.02 km^{2} (4.9 acres) or 0.3% is unproductive land.

Of the built up area, industrial buildings made up 2.0% of the total area while housing and buildings made up 12.2% and transportation infrastructure made up 6.2%. while parks, green belts and sports fields made up 1.1%. Out of the forested land, all of the forested land area is covered with heavy forests. Of the agricultural land, 50.6% is used for growing crops and 10.4% is pastures, while 2.9% is used for orchards or vine crops. All the water in the municipality is flowing water.

== Government ==
=== Politics ===
In the 2007 federal election the most popular party was the SVP which received 20.45% of the vote. The next three most popular parties were the SP (19.87%), the Green Party (14.75%) and the FDP (14.41%). In the federal election, a total of 1,343 votes were cast, and the voter turnout was 44.4%.

=== Coat of arms ===
The blazon of the municipal coat of arms is Or, an Oak-tree eradicated Sable leaved and fructed proper.

== Demographics ==
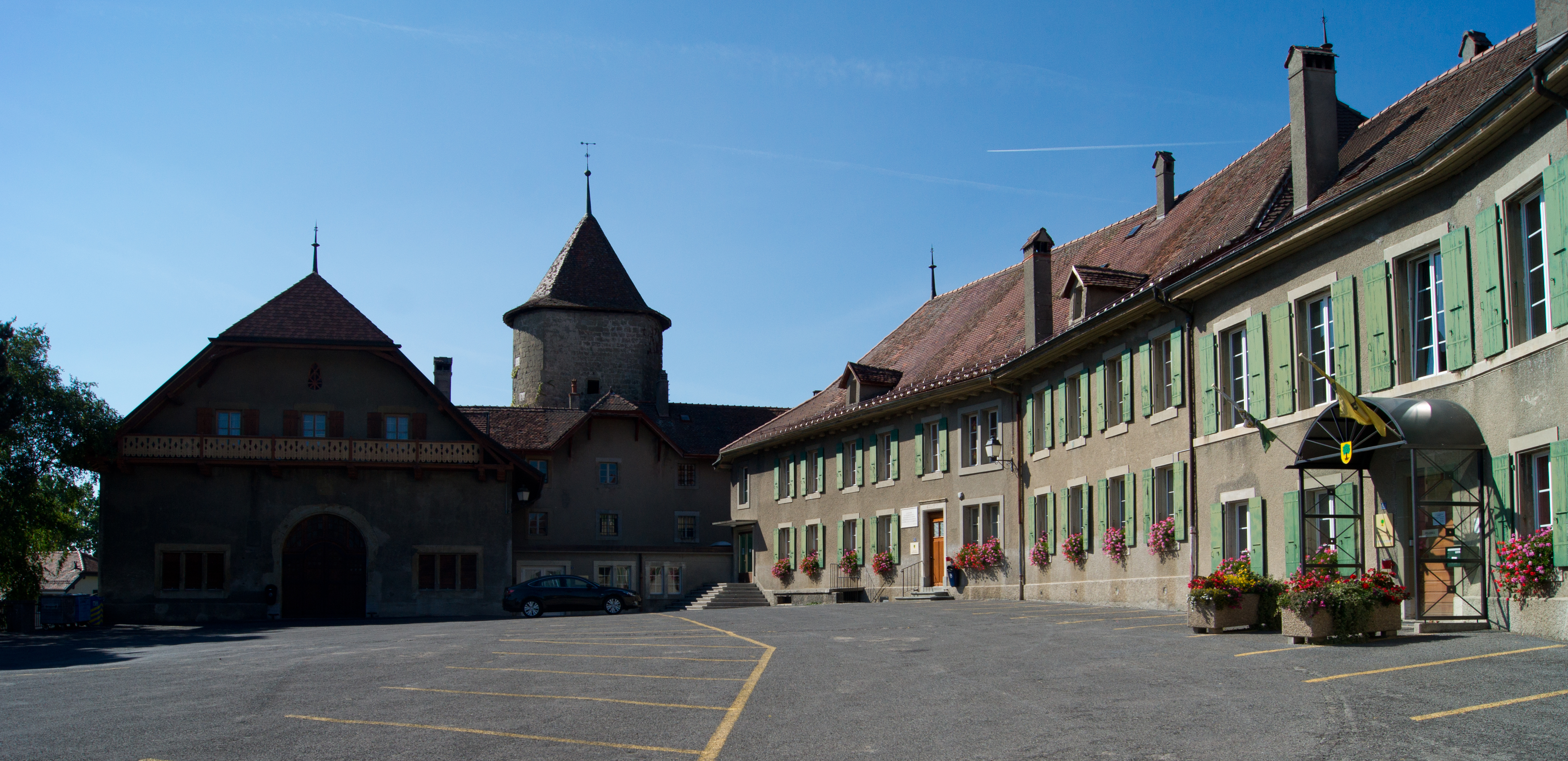
Échallens Castle

Échallens has a population (as of December 2020) of 5,729. As of 2008, 18.2% of the population are resident foreign nationals. Over the last 10 years (1999–2009 ) the population has changed at a rate of 25.7%. It has changed at a rate of 20.7% due to migration and at a rate of 4.9% due to births and deaths.

Most of the population (as of 2000) speaks French (3,815 or 89.1%), with German being second most common (122 or 2.8%) and Portuguese being third (90 or 2.1%). There are 78 people who speak Italian and 4 people who speak Romansh.

Of the population in the municipality 894 or about 20.9% were born in Échallens and lived there in 2000. There were 1,880 or 43.9% who were born in the same canton, while 615 or 14.4% were born somewhere else in Switzerland, and 800 or 18.7% were born outside of Switzerland.

In 2008 there were 28 live births to Swiss citizens and 6 births to non-Swiss citizens, and in same time span there were 33 deaths of Swiss citizens and 3 non-Swiss citizen deaths. Ignoring immigration and emigration, the population of Swiss citizens decreased by 5 while the foreign population increased by 3. There were 2 Swiss men and 3 Swiss women who emigrated from Switzerland. At the same time, there were 18 non-Swiss men and 12 non-Swiss women who immigrated from another country to Switzerland. The total Swiss population change in 2008 (from all sources, including moves across municipal borders) was a decrease of 30 and the non-Swiss population increased by 40 people. This represents a population growth rate of 0.2%.

The age distribution, as of 2009, in Échallens is; 651 children or 12.6% of the population are between 0 and 9 years old and 761 teenagers or 14.8% are between 10 and 19. Of the adult population, 651 people or 12.6% of the population are between 20 and 29 years old. 708 people or 13.8% are between 30 and 39, 930 people or 18.1% are between 40 and 49, and 605 people or 11.8% are between 50 and 59. The senior population distribution is 464 people or 9.0% of the population are between 60 and 69 years old, 242 people or 4.7% are between 70 and 79, there are 113 people or 2.2% who are between 80 and 89, and there are 22 people or 0.4% who are 90 and older.

As of 2000, there were 1,848 people who were single and never married in the municipality. There were 2,036 married individuals, 204 widows or widowers and 193 individuals who are divorced.

As of 2000, there were 1,634 private households in the municipality, and an average of 2.6 persons per household. There were 448 households that consist of only one person and 122 households with five or more people. Out of a total of 1,658 households that answered this question, 27.0% were households made up of just one person and there were 5 adults who lived with their parents. Of the rest of the households, there are 391 married couples without children, 672 married couples with children There were 102 single parents with a child or children. There were 16 households that were made up of unrelated people and 24 households that were made up of some sort of institution or another collective housing.

In 2000 there were 486 single family homes (or 61.4% of the total) out of a total of 791 inhabited buildings. There were 135 multi-family buildings (17.1%), along with 120 multi-purpose buildings that were mostly used for housing (15.2%) and 50 other use buildings (commercial or industrial) that also had some housing (6.3%). Of the single family homes 19 were built before 1919, while 137 were built between 1990 and 2000. The greatest number of single family homes (176) were built between 1981 and 1990. The most multi-family homes (27) were built before 1919 and the next most (25) were built between 1981 and 1990. There were 2 multi-family houses built between 1996 and 2000.

In 2000 there were 1,747 apartments in the municipality. The most common apartment size was 4 rooms of which there were 493. There were 75 single room apartments and 427 apartments with five or more rooms. Of these apartments, a total of 1,582 apartments (90.6% of the total) were permanently occupied, while 141 apartments (8.1%) were seasonally occupied and 24 apartments (1.4%) were empty. As of 2009, the construction rate of new housing units was 2.5 new units per 1000 residents. The vacancy rate for the municipality, in 2010, was 0.14%.

The historical population is given in the following chart:

== Economy ==
Échallens is a regionally important commercial center of the Gros de Vaud. Until the end of the 19th century, it was primarily agricultural. Today, agriculture is quite marginal.

The municipality became slowly industrialized, with machining, metalworking, and textiles being the major industries.

Most jobs (almost 70 percent) are in the service sector. Many people now commute to Lausanne.

As of 2010, Échallens had an unemployment rate of 4.3%. As of 2008, there were 50 people employed in the primary economic sector and about 17 businesses involved in this sector. 291 people were employed in the secondary sector and there were 39 businesses in this sector. 1,593 people were employed in the tertiary sector, with 213 businesses in this sector. There were 2,206 residents of the municipality who were employed in some capacity, of which females made up 42.8% of the workforce.

In 2008 the total number of full-time equivalent jobs was 1,566. The number of jobs in the primary sector was 38, of which 31 were in agriculture and 7 were in forestry or lumber production. The number of jobs in the secondary sector was 279 of which 53 or (19.0%) were in manufacturing and 224 (80.3%) were in construction. The number of jobs in the tertiary sector was 1,249. In the tertiary sector; 382 or 30.6% were in wholesale or retail sales or the repair of motor vehicles, 105 or 8.4% were in the movement and storage of goods, 69 or 5.5% were in a hotel or restaurant, 13 or 1.0% were in the information industry, 85 or 6.8% were the insurance or financial industry, 130 or 10.4% were technical professionals or scientists, 126 or 10.1% were in education and 141 or 11.3% were in health care.

In 2000, there were 980 workers who commuted into the municipality and 1,535 workers who commuted away. The municipality is a net exporter of workers, with about 1.6 workers leaving the municipality for every one entering. Of the working population, 15.6% used public transportation to get to work, and 63% used a private car.

== Religion ==
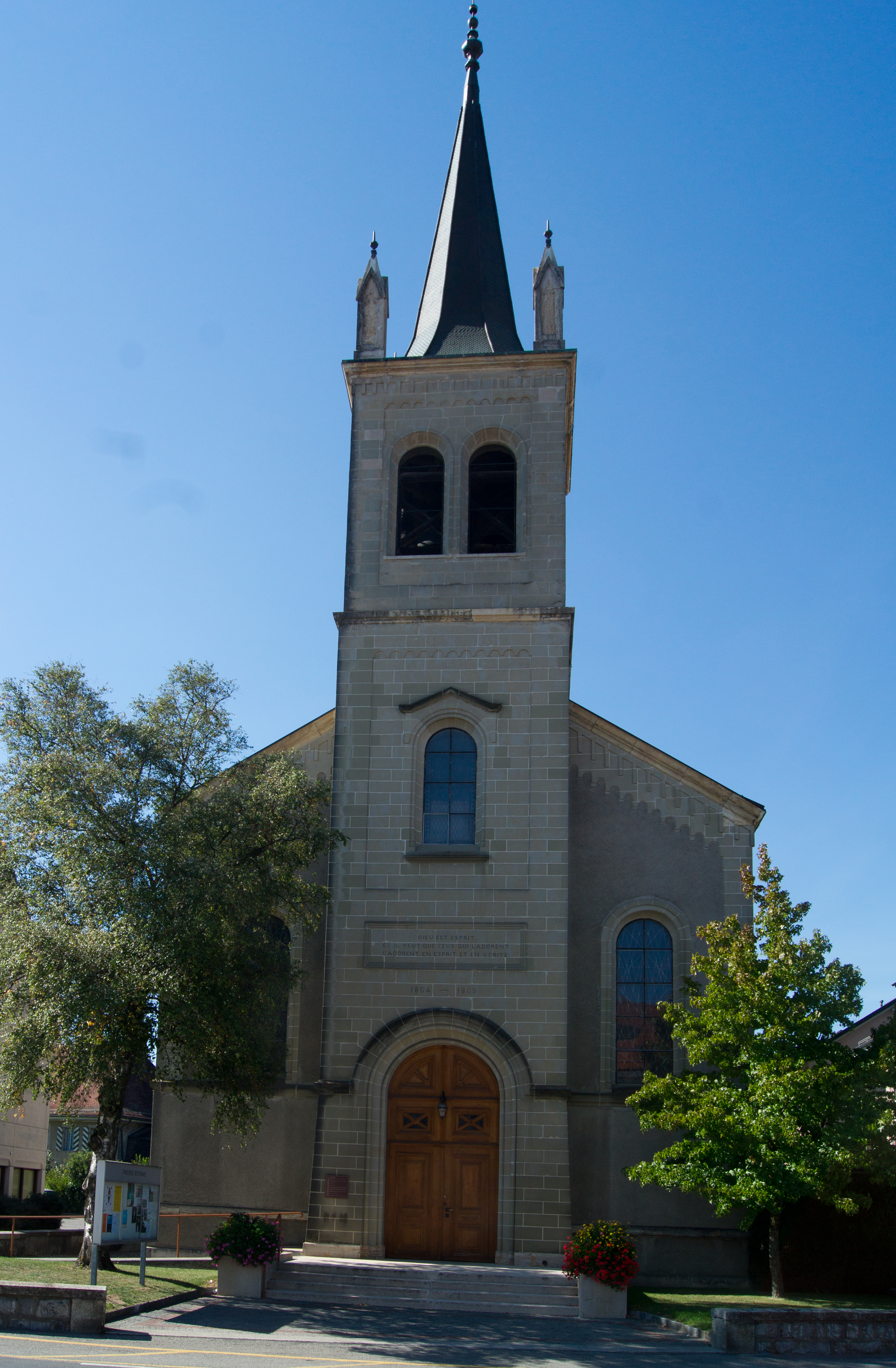
A church in Échallens

From the 2000 census, 1,667 or 38.9% were Roman Catholic, while 1,595 or 37.3% belonged to the Swiss Reformed Church. Of the rest of the population, there were 179 members of an Orthodox church (or about 4.18% of the population), and there were 292 individuals (or about 6.82% of the population) who belonged to another Christian church. There were 4 individuals (or about 0.09% of the population) who were Jewish, and 81 (or about 1.89% of the population) who were Islamic. There were 4 individuals who were Buddhist and 9 individuals who belonged to another church. 464 (or about 10.84% of the population) belonged to no church, are agnostic or atheist, and 127 individuals (or about 2.97% of the population) did not answer the question.

== Climate ==
Échallens has an average of 121.6 days of rain or snow per year and on average receives 972 mm (38.3 in) of precipitation. The wettest month is June during which time Échallens receives an average of 99 mm (3.9 in) of rain or snow. During this month there is precipitation for an average of 11.2 days. The month with the most days of precipitation is May, with an average of 12.3, but with only 89 mm (3.5 in) of rain or snow. The driest month of the year is February with an average of 69 mm (2.7 in) of precipitation over 10.1 days.

== Education ==
In Échallens about 1,654 or (38.6%) of the population have completed non-mandatory upper secondary education, and 481 or (11.2%) have completed additional higher education (either university or a Fachhochschule). Of the 481 who completed tertiary schooling, 62.4% were Swiss men, 25.6% were Swiss women, 6.7% were non-Swiss men and 5.4% were non-Swiss women.

In the 2009/2010 school year there were a total of 830 students in the Échallens school district. In the Vaud cantonal school system, two years of non-obligatory pre-school are provided by the political districts. During the school year, the political district provided pre-school care for a total of 296 children of which 96 children (32.4%) received subsidized pre-school care. The canton's primary school program requires students to attend for four years. There were 443 students in the municipal primary school program. The obligatory lower secondary school program lasts for six years and there were 373 students in those schools. There were also 14 students who were home schooled or attended another non-traditional school.

Échallens is home to 1 museum, the Maison du blé et du pain (House of wheat and bread). In 2009 it was visited by 11,087 visitors while the average in previous years was 11,438.

As of 2000, there were 344 students in Échallens who came from another municipality, while 201 residents attended schools outside the municipality.

== Sport ==
FC Echallens play in the town. The team currently plays in Liga 1., the fourth highest tier in the Swiss football pyramid. Their home stadium is Sportplatz 3 Sapins which is situated on the outskirts of Échallens.

== Transport ==
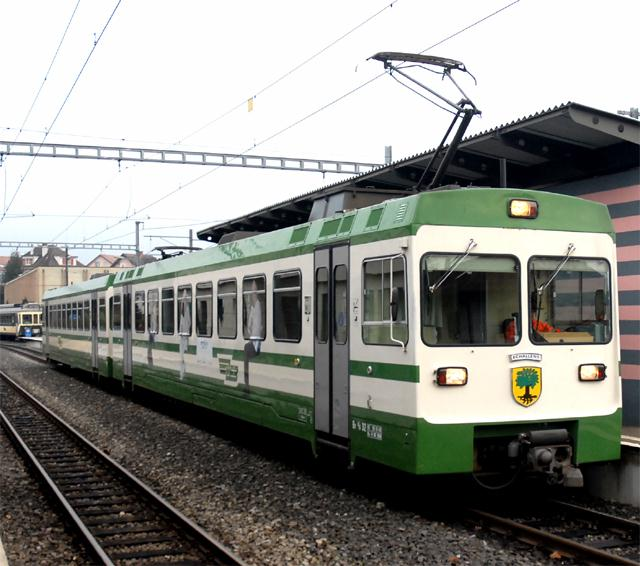
A train of the Lausanne-Échallens-Bercher line at Échallens station

=== Railway ===
The municipality has three stations on the Lausanne-Échallens-Bercher line: Echallens, Sur Roche, and Grésaley. Echallens station has a service every fifteen minutes between it and Lausanne, with every other train continuing from Échallens to Bercher. Sur Roche and Grésaley have a half-hourly service to Lausanne in one direction, and Bercher in the other.

=== Road ===
Échallens lies on the main highway between Lausanne and Yverdon-les-Bains. The entrance to the A1 motorway at La Sarraz opened in 1981 and is only about 7 km from the center. There are bus lines to Chavornay, Yverdon and Thierrens.

== Notable people ==
- Émile Gardaz (1931 in Échallens - 2007) a Swiss Romand radio moderator and author
- Gabriel Wüthrich (born 1981 in Échallens) a Swiss football goalkeeper
