= Gros-de-Vaud =

Area of the Swiss canton of Vaud

Coordinates: 46°38′28″N 6°38′04″E

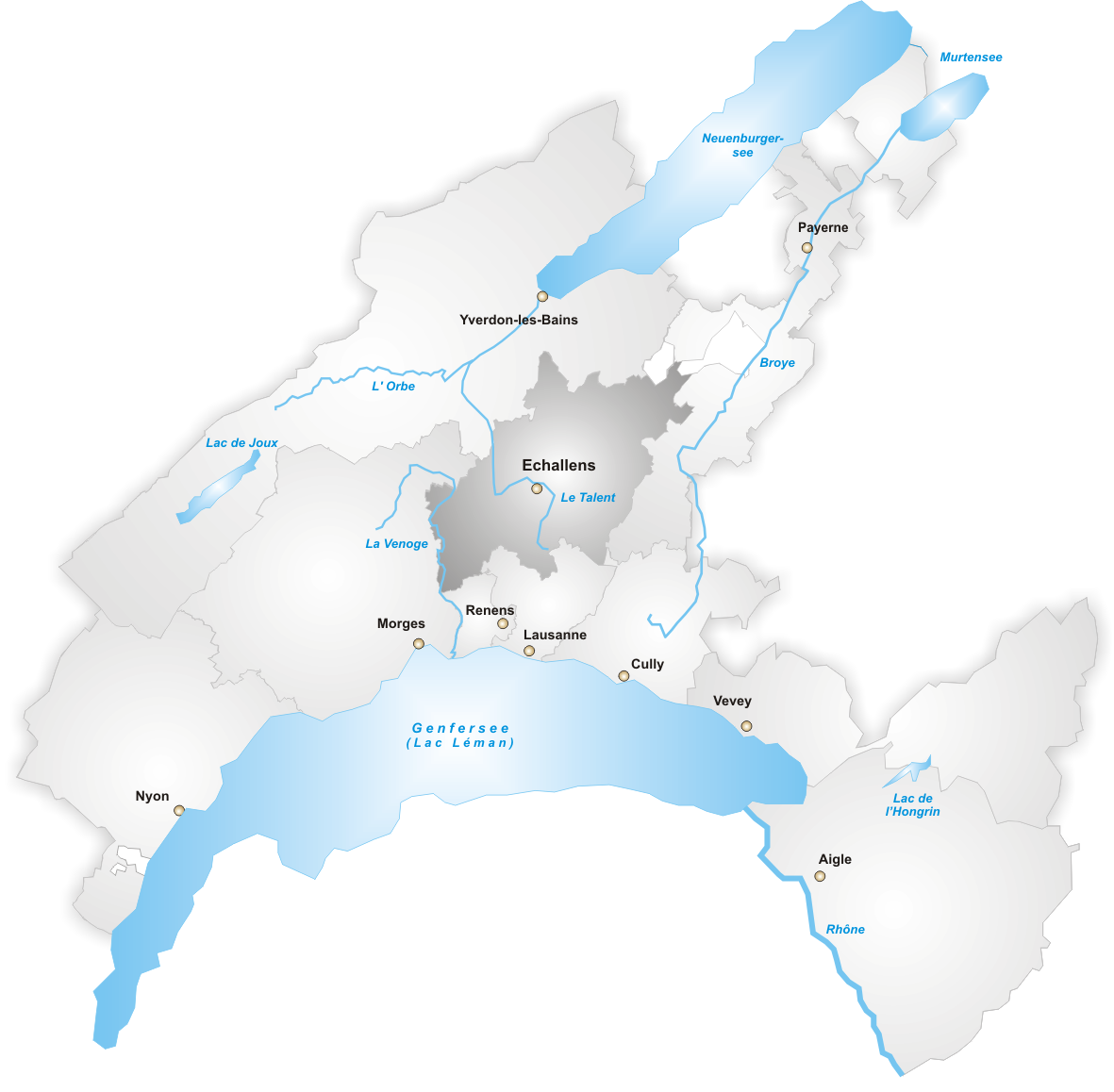
Location of the Gros-de-Vaud

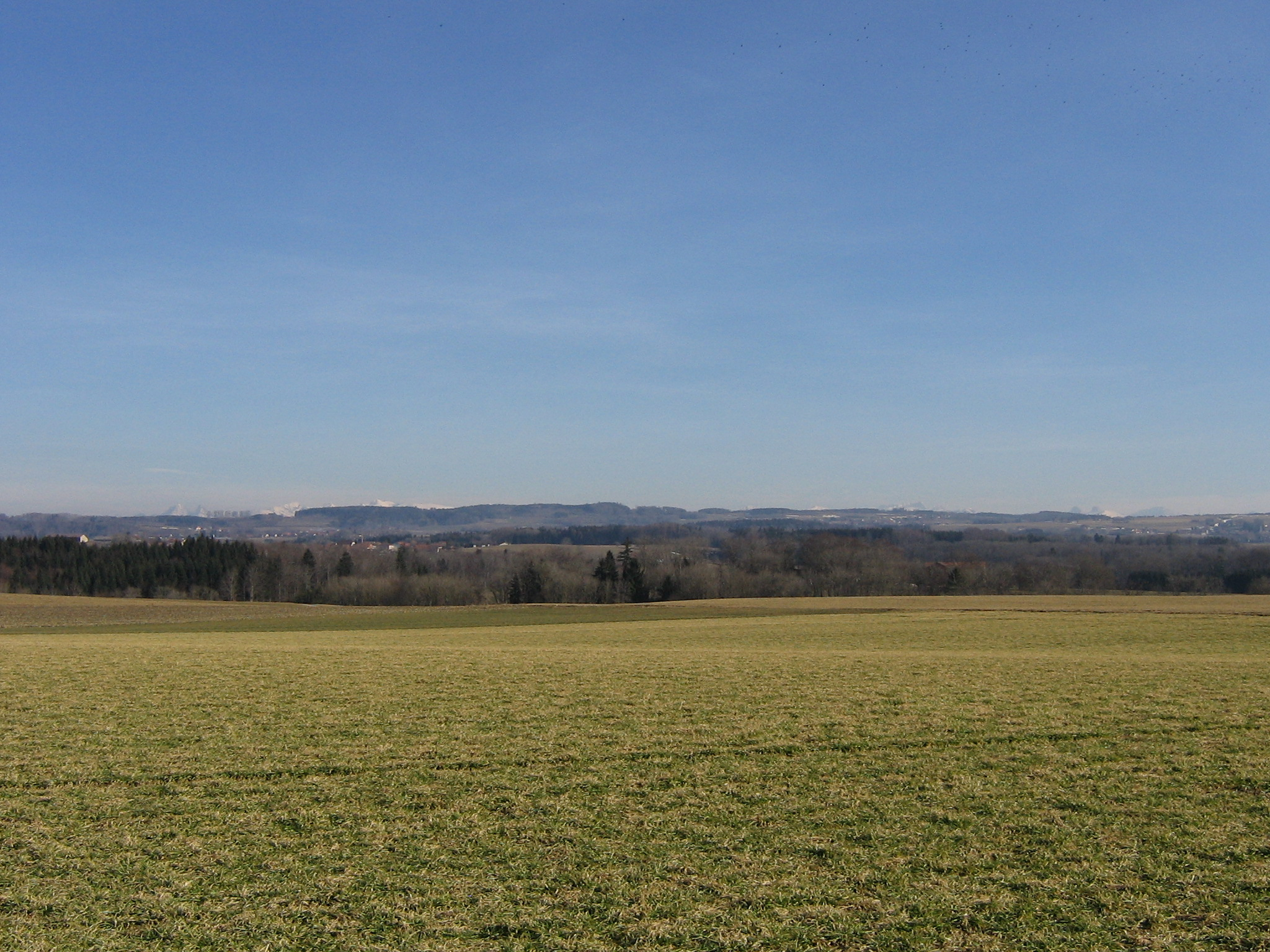
A view across the Gros-de-Vaud to the Jorat ridge, with the Alps in the distance

The Gros-de-Vaud is a geographic region in the Swiss canton of Vaud, and part of the Swiss Plateau. Unlike the district of the same name, the geographic region has no formal borders, but stretches from the foothills of the Jura in the north to the heights above Lake Geneva in the south, and from the valleys of the Venoge and Nozon in the west to the Jorat ridge in the east. The historian Louis Vulliemin coined the term in 1875.

The Gros de Vaud is characterized by a gently undulating plateau landscape with an average elevation of 550 metres (1,800 ft) to 600 metres (2,000 ft) above sea level. The region is sometimes called the canton's granary, as its relatively dry climate favors grain cultivation. Cattle farming has also played a role in the region's economy, and a Nestlé condensed milk factory operated in Bercher from 1880 to 1921.

The watershed between the river basins of the Rhine and the Rhone crosses the region, which is principally drained by the rivers Venoge, Nozon, Talent and Menthue. The Venoge drains into Lake Geneva and hence the Rhone, whilst the Nozon, Talent and Menthue all flow north, with their waters eventually entering Lake Neuchatel and hence the Rhine.

The city of Lausanne lies to the south of the Gros de Vaud, and Yverdon-les-Bains is to the north. The community of Echallens lies at its centre, and is the capital of the Gros-de-Vaud district. Besides Echallens, the region consists of a number of villages, rarely exceeding 1,000 inhabitants.

The Gros-de-Vaud is served by the Lausanne-Echallens-Bercher railway line, which opened from Lausanne to Echallens in 1874, and was extended to Bercher in 1889. Originally conceived to carry the agricultural produce of the region to market, the line now functions as a commuter railway. The main highway between Lausanne and Yverdon passes through the centre of the region, whilst the A1 motorway passes along its western edge.
