= Kudelski =

Kudelski may refer to:

- André Kudelski (born 1960), CEO of the Kudelski Group
- Bob Kudelski (born 1964), American ice hockey player
- Carl Matthias Kudelski (1805–1877), a German composer
- Stefan Kudelski (1929–2013), Polish audio engineer
- Andrzej Kudelski (born 1952), Polish Olympic wrestler
- Kudelski Group, a Swiss technology company
