= Cheseaux-sur-Lausanne =

- Municipality
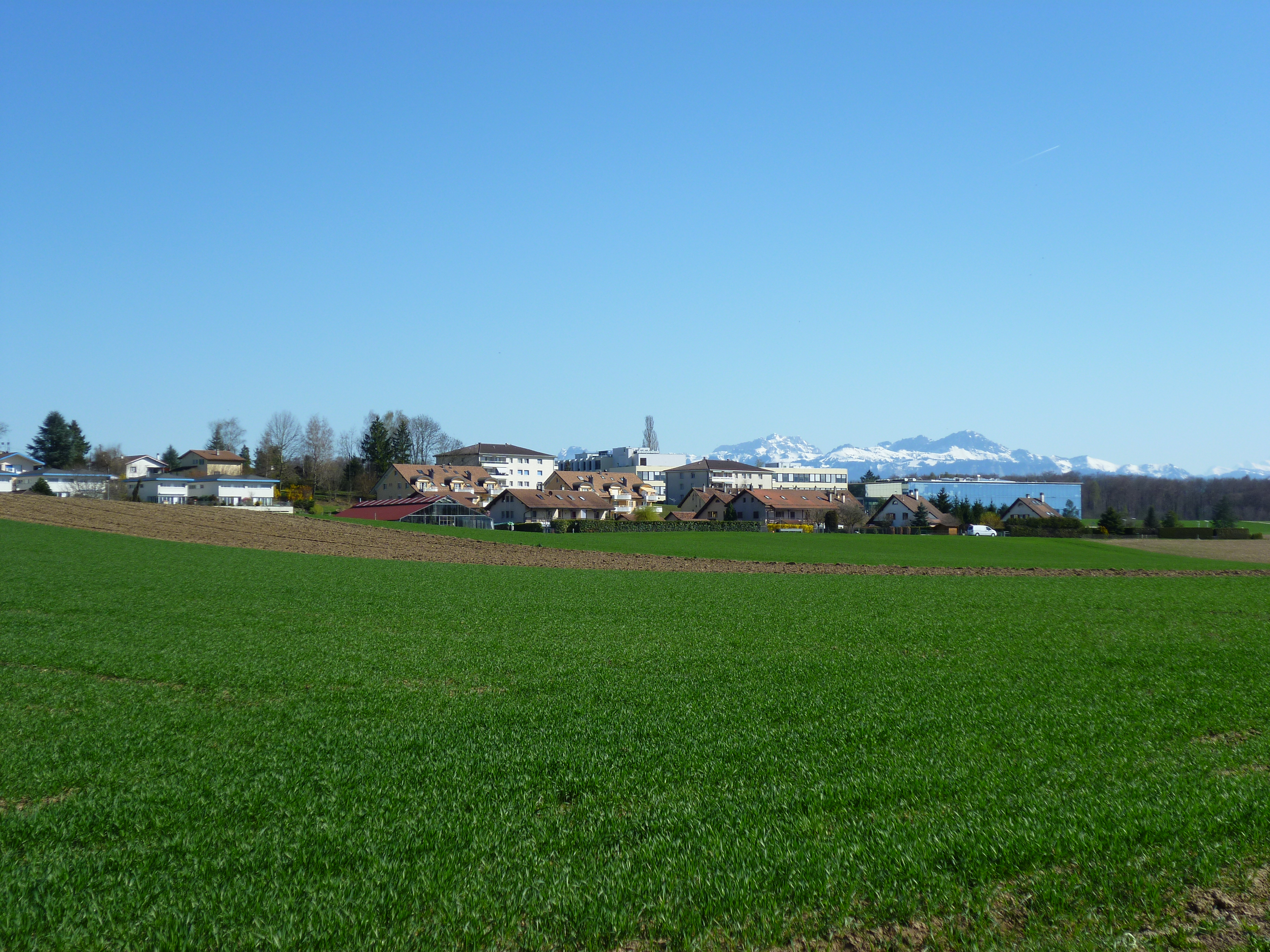
- Cheseaux-sur-Lausanne village

- Flag Coat of arms
- Location of Cheseaux-sur-Lausanne
- Location within Switzerland Location within Canton of Vaud
- Coordinates: 46°35′N 06°36′E
- Country: Switzerland
- Canton: Vaud
- District: Lausanne

Government
  - Mayor: Syndic; Louis Savary

Area
  - Total: 4.59 km^{2} (1.77 sq mi)
- Elevation: 604 m (1,982 ft)

Population (2003)
  - Total: 2,996
  - Density: 653/km^{2} (1,690/sq mi)
- Time zone: UTC+01:00 (CET)
  - Summer (DST): UTC+02:00 (CEST)
- Postal code: 1033
- SFOS number: 5582
- ISO 3166 code: CH-VD
- Surrounded by: Boussens, Crissier, Etagnières, Lausanne, Morrens, Sullens
- Twin towns: Aubignan (France)
- Website: www.cheseaux.ch

Cheseaux-sur-Lausanne (French pronunciation: [ʃəzo syʁ lɔzan], literally Cheseaux on Lausanne; Arpitan: Chesâls) is a municipality in the district of Lausanne in the canton of Vaud in Switzerland. It is a suburb of the city of Lausanne.

== History ==
Cheseaux-sur-Lausanne is first mentioned in 1228 as Chesaus. Roman remains, in the form of columns and mosaics and dating from the 3rd century AD, have been discovered, as have 5th century Burgundian tombs. The has been a church, dedicated to Saint Nicholas, since at least 1174, although the current building dates from 1741.

The railway reached Chesaux in 1873, with the opening of the first section of the Chemin de fer Lausanne-Échallens from Lausanne. The following year the line was extended from Chesaux to Échallens.

The first municipal council was elected in 1963. The municipality was part of the old Lausanne District until it was dissolved on 31 August 2006, and Cheseaux-sur-Lausanne became part of the new district of Lausanne.

== Geography ==
Aerial view (1964)

Cheseaux-sur-Lausanne lies some 7.5 kilometres (4.7 mi) north-north-west of the centre of the city of Lausanne and 8 kilometres (5.0 mi) north of the shoreline of Lake Geneva. With an elevation of 604 metres (1,982 ft), it is 232 metres (761 ft) higher than the lake. Formerly an agricultural community in the Gros-de-Vaud, it is now part of the urban agglomeration of Lausanne.

The municipality has an area, as of 2009, of 4.59 square kilometres (1.77 mi^{2}). Of this area, 2.77 km^{2} (1.07 mi^{2}) or 60.3% is used for agricultural purposes, while 0.67 km^{2} (0.26 mi^{2}) or 14.6% is forested. Of the rest of the land, 1.1 km^{2} (0.42 mi^{2}) or 24.0% is settled (buildings or roads), 0.03 km^{2} (7.4 acres) or 0.7% is either rivers or lakes.

Of the built up area, industrial buildings made up 2.6% of the total area while housing and buildings made up 12.0% and transportation infrastructure made up 7.2%. while parks, green belts and sports fields made up 1.3%. Out of the forested land, 13.5% of the total land area is heavily forested and 1.1% is covered with orchards or small clusters of trees. Of the agricultural land, 47.9% is used for growing crops and 9.6% is pastures, while 2.8% is used for orchards or vine crops. All the water in the municipality is flowing water.

== Government ==
=== Politics ===
In the 2007 federal election the most popular party was the SP which received 25.95% of the vote. The next three most popular parties were the SVP (22.16%), the Green Party (14.99%) and the FDP (10.94%). In the federal election, a total of 959 votes were cast, and the voter turnout was 44.1%.

=== Coat of arms ===
The blazon of the municipal coat of arms is Gules with a Chief Argent, an Inescutcheon gyronny Argent and Azure.

== Demographics ==
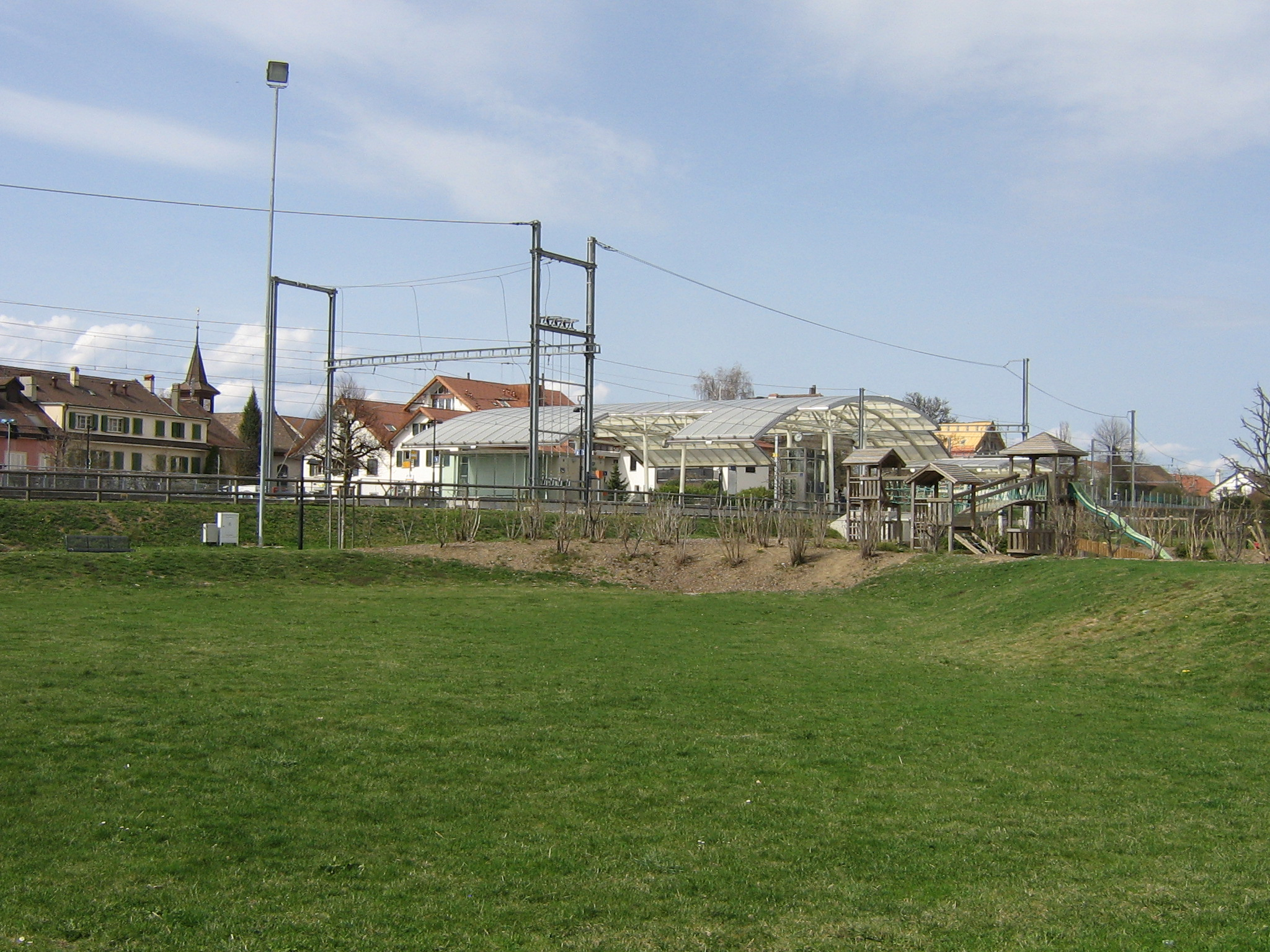
Train station at Cheseaux-sur-Lausanne

Cheseaux-sur-Lausanne has a population (as of December 2020) of 4,360. As of 2008, 20.5% of the population are resident foreign nationals. Over the last 10 years (1999–2009) the population has changed at a rate of 29.4%. It has changed at a rate of 22% due to migration and at a rate of 7.6% due to births and deaths.

Most of the population (as of 2000) speaks French (2,626 or 89.4%), with German being second most common (119 or 4.0%) and Portuguese being third (66 or 2.2%). There are 38 people who speak Italian.

Of the population in the municipality 526 or about 17.9% were born in Cheseaux-sur-Lausanne and lived there in 2000. There were 1,317 or 44.8% who were born in the same canton, while 494 or 16.8% were born somewhere else in Switzerland, and 533 or 18.1% were born outside of Switzerland.

In 2008 there were 26 live births to Swiss citizens and 9 births to non-Swiss citizens, and in same time span there were 15 deaths of Swiss citizens and 5 non-Swiss citizen deaths. Ignoring immigration and emigration, the population of Swiss citizens increased by 11 while the foreign population increased by 4. There were 2 Swiss men and 4 Swiss women who emigrated from Switzerland. At the same time, there were 13 non-Swiss men and 15 non-Swiss women who immigrated from another country to Switzerland. The total Swiss population change in 2008 (from all sources, including moves across municipal borders) was an increase of 123 and the non-Swiss population increased by 70 people. This represents a population growth rate of 5.6%.

The age distribution, as of 2009, in Cheseaux-sur-Lausanne is; 452 children or 12.1% of the population are between 0 and 9 years old and 451 teenagers or 12.0% are between 10 and 19. Of the adult population, 517 people or 13.8% of the population are between 20 and 29 years old. 609 people or 16.3% are between 30 and 39, 612 people or 16.4% are between 40 and 49, and 507 people or 13.5% are between 50 and 59. The senior population distribution is 347 people or 9.3% of the population are between 60 and 69 years old, 169 people or 4.5% are between 70 and 79, there are 69 people or 1.8% who are between 80 and 89, and there are 10 people or 0.3% who are 90 and older.

As of 2000, there were 1,240 people who were single and never married in the municipality. There were 1,440 married individuals, 91 widows or widowers and 168 individuals who are divorced.

As of 2000, there were 1,225 private households in the municipality, and an average of 2.4 persons per household. There were 382 households that consist of only one person and 68 households with five or more people. Out of a total of 1,245 households that answered this question, 30.7% were households made up of just one person and there were 5 adults who lived with their parents. Of the rest of the households, there are 330 married couples without children, 427 married couples with children. There were 69 single parents with a child or children. There were 12 households that were made up of unrelated people and 20 households that were made up of some sort of institution or another collective housing.

In 2000 there were 223 single family homes (or 54.3% of the total) out of a total of 411 inhabited buildings. There were 93 multi-family buildings (22.6%), along with 78 multi-purpose buildings that were mostly used for housing (19.0%) and 17 other use buildings (commercial or industrial) that also had some housing (4.1%). Of the single family homes 7 were built before 1919, while 36 were built between 1990 and 2000. The greatest number of single family homes (118) were built between 1981 and 1990. The most multi-family homes (35) were built between 1961 and 1970 and the next most (26) were built between 1971 and 1980.

In 2000 there were 1,349 apartments in the municipality. The most common apartment size was 3 rooms of which there were 497. There were 71 single room apartments and 280 apartments with five or more rooms. Of these apartments, a total of 1,195 apartments (88.6% of the total) were permanently occupied, while 137 apartments (10.2%) were seasonally occupied and 17 apartments (1.3%) were empty. As of 2009, the construction rate of new housing units was 8.3 new units per 1000 residents. The vacancy rate for the municipality, in 2010, was 0%.

The historical population is given in the following chart:

== Economy ==
With good motorway connections, Cheseaux has attracted businesses in the construction, furniture and food businesses. It hosts the headquarters of Kudelski SA, a company founded by Stefan Kudelski who invented the Nagra audio recorder.

As of 2010, Cheseaux-sur-Lausanne had an unemployment rate of 4.4%. As of 2008, there were 45 people employed in the primary economic sector and about 16 businesses involved in this sector. 972 people were employed in the secondary sector and there were 31 businesses in this sector. 947 people were employed in the tertiary sector, with 85 businesses in this sector. There were 1,642 residents of the municipality who were employed in some capacity, of which females made up 44.5% of the workforce.

In 2008 the total number of full-time equivalent jobs was 1,776. The number of jobs in the primary sector was 29, all of which were in agriculture. The number of jobs in the secondary sector was 942 of which 835 or (88.6%) were in manufacturing and 107 (11.4%) were in construction. The number of jobs in the tertiary sector was 805. In the tertiary sector; 125 or 15.5% were in wholesale or retail sales or the repair of motor vehicles, 37 or 4.6% were in the movement and storage of goods, 76 or 9.4% were in a hotel or restaurant, 438 or 54.4% were in the information industry, 8 or 1.0% were the insurance or financial industry, 21 or 2.6% were technical professionals or scientists, 54 or 6.7% were in education and 15 or 1.9% were in health care.

In 2000, there were 1,098 workers who commuted into the municipality and 1,323 workers who commuted away. The municipality is a net exporter of workers, with about 1.2 workers leaving the municipality for every one entering. About 4.2% of the workforce coming into Cheseaux-sur-Lausanne are coming from outside Switzerland. Of the working population, 14.7% used public transportation to get to work, and 70% used a private car.

== Transport ==
=== Railway ===
The municipality has a railway station, Cheseaux, on the suburban Lausanne–Échallens–Bercher line. A second station on the same line, Bel-Air LEB, is nearby but administratively part of the Vernand exclave of Lausanne. Trains from both stations provide a service every fifteen minutes between Cheseaux and Lausanne, and between Cheseaux and Échallens, with every other train continuing from Échallens to Bercher.

=== Road ===
Cheseaux is situated on the main road (route 5) that, prior to the construction of the Swiss motorway network, linked Lausanne with Échallens, Yverdon, Neuchâtel and points north. It is now located near the A1 and A9 motorways that provide links throughout, and beyond, Switzerland.

== Religion ==
From the 2000 census, 983 or 33.4% were Roman Catholic, while 1,319 or 44.9% belonged to the Swiss Reformed Church. Of the rest of the population, there were 49 members of an Orthodox church (or about 1.67% of the population), there was 1 individual who belongs to the Christian Catholic Church, and there were 144 individuals (or about 4.90% of the population) who belonged to another Christian church. There was 1 individual who was Jewish, and 44 (or about 1.50% of the population) who were Islamic. There were 3 individuals who were Buddhist. 354 (or about 12.04% of the population) belonged to no church, are agnostic or atheist, and 112 individuals (or about 3.81% of the population) did not answer the question.

== Education ==
In Cheseaux-sur-Lausanne about 1,222 or (41.6%) of the population have completed non-mandatory upper secondary education, and 354 or (12.0%) have completed additional higher education (either university or a Fachhochschule). Of the 354 who completed tertiary schooling, 55.9% were Swiss men, 27.4% were Swiss women, 11.3% were non-Swiss men and 5.4% were non-Swiss women.

In the 2009/2010 school year there were a total of 463 students in the Cheseaux-sur-Lausanne school district. In the Vaud cantonal school system, two years of non-obligatory pre-school are provided by the political districts. During the school year, the political district provided pre-school care for a total of 2,648 children of which 1,947 children (73.5%) received subsidized pre-school care. The canton's primary school program requires students to attend for four years. There were 247 students in the municipal primary school program. The obligatory lower secondary school program lasts for six years and there were 214 students in those schools. There were also 2 students who were home schooled or attended another non-traditional school.

As of 2000, there were 131 students in Cheseaux-sur-Lausanne who came from another municipality, while 256 residents attended schools outside the municipality.

== Twin Town ==
Cheseaux-sur-Lausanne is twinned with the town of Aubignan, France.
