= Cugy =

Cugy refers to the following places is Switzerland:

- Cugy, Vaud
- Cugy, Fribourg
