= Bel-Air station =

Bel-Air station or Bel-Air railway station could refer to:

- Bel-Air station (Paris Metro), a station on Line 6 of the Metro in Paris, France
- Bel-Air LEB railway station, a railway station on the Lausanne-Echallens-Bercher line in Vaud, Switzerland
- Bel-Air tram stop, on the former Lausanne Tramway Company system in Lausanne, Switzerland
- Belair railway station, a railway station on the Adelaide to Melbourne line in Victoria, Australia
