= Bretigny-sur-Morrens =

- Municipality
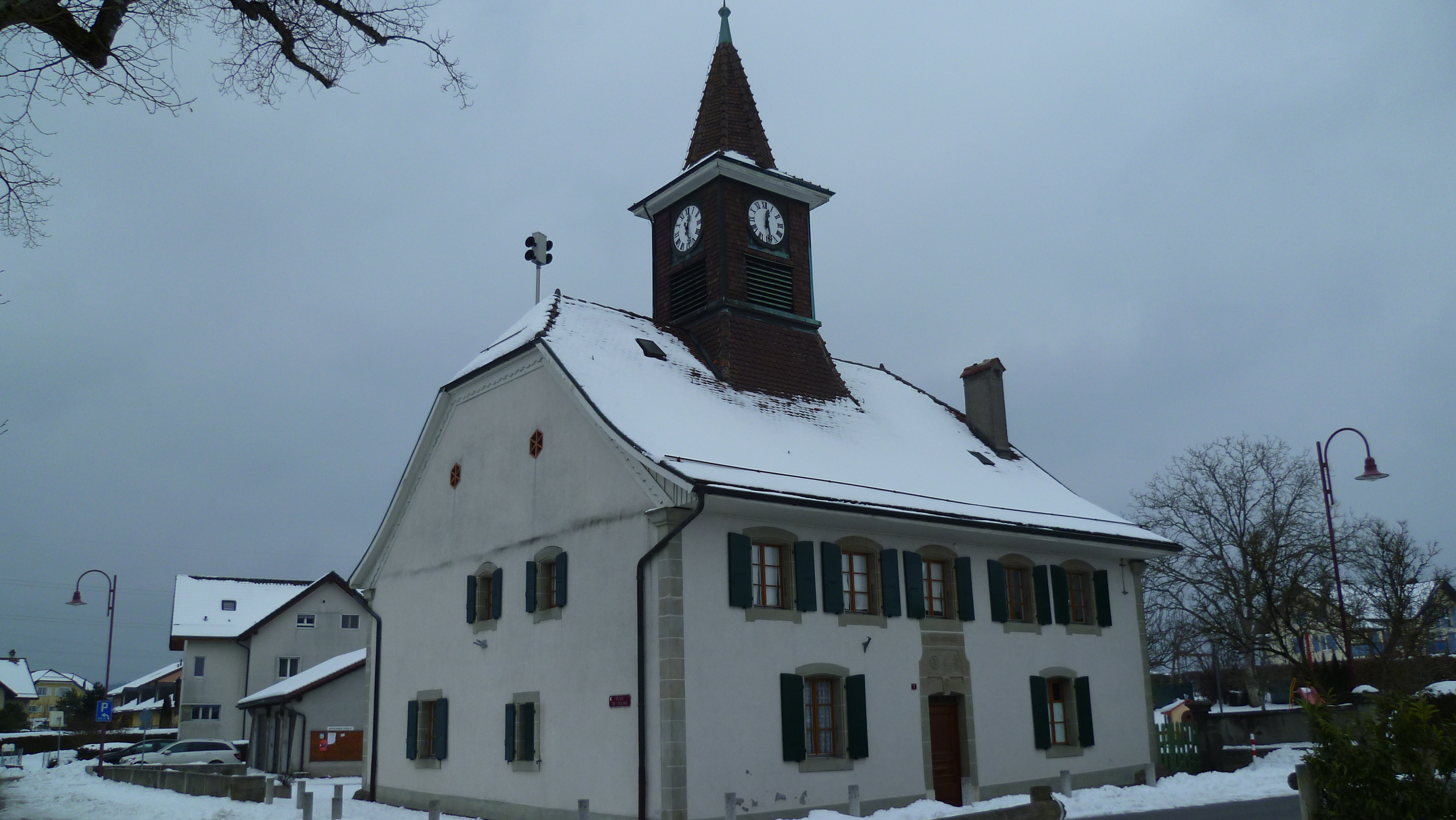

- Flag Coat of arms
- Location of Bretigny-sur-Morrens
- Location within Switzerland Location within Canton of Vaud
- Coordinates: 46°36′N 6°38′E
- Country: Switzerland
- Canton: Vaud
- District: Gros-de-Vaud

Government
  - Mayor: Syndic

Area
  - Total: 2.86 km^{2} (1.10 sq mi)
- Elevation: 721 m (2,365 ft)

Population (December 2004)
  - Total: 688
  - Density: 241/km^{2} (623/sq mi)
- Time zone: UTC+01:00 (CET)
  - Summer (DST): UTC+02:00 (CEST)
- Postal code: 1053
- SFOS number: 5515
- ISO 3166 code: CH-VD
- Surrounded by: Assens, Bottens, Cugy, Lausanne, Morrens
- Website: http://www.bretigny.ch Profile (in French), SFSO statistics

Bretigny-sur-Morrens (French pronunciation: [bʁətiɲi syʁ mɔʁɑ̃], literally Bretigny on Morrens) is a municipality in the district of Gros-de-Vaud in the canton of Vaud in Switzerland.

== History ==
Bretigny-sur-Morrens is first mentioned in 1224 as Britignie.

== Geography ==
Bretigny-sur-Morrens has an area, as of 2009, of 2.86 square kilometers (1.10 sq mi). Of this area, 1.85 km^{2} (0.71 sq mi) or 64.7% is used for agricultural purposes, while 0.69 km^{2} (0.27 sq mi) or 24.1% is forested. Of the rest of the land, 0.31 km^{2} (0.12 sq mi) or 10.8% is settled (buildings or roads).

Of the built up area, housing and buildings made up 7.3% and transportation infrastructure made up 1.0%. while parks, green belts and sports fields made up 1.7%. Out of the forested land, all of the forested land area is covered with heavy forests. Of the agricultural land, 43.0% is used for growing crops and 19.6% is pastures, while 2.1% is used for orchards or vine crops.

The municipality was part of the Echallens District until it was dissolved on 31 August 2006, and Bretigny-sur-Morrens became part of the new district of Gros-de-Vaud.

== Coat of arms ==
The blazon of the municipal coat of arms is Per bend sinister Argent and Gules, a ram rampant counterchanged.

== Demographics ==
Bretigny-sur-Morrens has a population (as of December 2020) of 859. As of 2008, 9.8% of the population are resident foreign nationals. Over the last 10 years (1999–2009 ) the population has changed at a rate of 31.4%. It has changed at a rate of 14.3% due to migration and at a rate of 17.3% due to births and deaths.

Most of the population (as of 2000) speaks French (535 or 95.0%), with German being second most common (19 or 3.4%) and Italian being third (3 or 0.5%).

Of the population in the municipality 119 or about 21.1% were born in Bretigny-sur-Morrens and lived there in 2000. There were 279 or 49.6% who were born in the same canton, while 82 or 14.6% were born somewhere else in Switzerland, and 73 or 13.0% were born outside of Switzerland.

In 2008 there were 15 live births to Swiss citizens and 1 birth to non-Swiss citizens, and in same time span there were 4 deaths of Swiss citizens. Ignoring immigration and emigration, the population of Swiss citizens increased by 11 while the foreign population increased by 1. At the same time, there were 2 non-Swiss men who immigrated from another country to Switzerland. The total Swiss population change in 2008 (from all sources, including moves across municipal borders) was an increase of 4 and the non-Swiss population decreased by 4 people. This represents a population growth rate of 0.0%.

The age distribution, as of 2009, in Bretigny-sur-Morrens is; 114 children or 15.7% of the population are between 0 and 9 years old and 87 teenagers or 12.0% are between 10 and 19. Of the adult population, 75 people or 10.3% of the population are between 20 and 29 years old. 137 people or 18.8% are between 30 and 39, 122 people or 16.8% are between 40 and 49, and 81 people or 11.1% are between 50 and 59. The senior population distribution is 68 people or 9.3% of the population are between 60 and 69 years old, 29 people or 4.0% are between 70 and 79, there are 12 people or 1.6% who are between 80 and 89, and there are 3 people or 0.4% who are 90 and older.

As of 2000, there were 240 people who were single and never married in the municipality. There were 257 married individuals, 25 widows or widowers and 41 individuals who are divorced.

As of 2000, there were 228 private households in the municipality, and an average of 2.4 persons per household. There were 57 households that consist of only one person and 13 households with five or more people. Out of a total of 234 households that answered this question, 24.4% were households made up of just one person. Of the rest of the households, there are 67 married couples without children, 77 married couples with children There were 21 single parents with a child or children. There were 6 households that were made up of unrelated people and 6 households that were made up of some sort of institution or another collective housing.

In 2000 there were 50 single family homes (or 49.5% of the total) out of a total of 101 inhabited buildings. There were 32 multi-family buildings (31.7%), along with 16 multi-purpose buildings that were mostly used for housing (15.8%) and 3 other use buildings (commercial or industrial) that also had some housing (3.0%). Of the single family homes 9 were built before 1919, while 5 were built between 1990 and 2000. The greatest number of single family homes (15) were built between 1971 and 1980. The most multi-family homes (7) were built between 1981 and 1990 and the next most (6) were built before 1919. There were 5 multi-family houses built between 1996 and 2000.

In 2000 there were 249 apartments in the municipality. The most common apartment size was 4 rooms of which there were 85. There were 7 single room apartments and 74 apartments with five or more rooms. Of these apartments, a total of 227 apartments (91.2% of the total) were permanently occupied, while 15 apartments (6.0%) were seasonally occupied and 7 apartments (2.8%) were empty. As of 2009, the construction rate of new housing units was 0 new units per 1000 residents. The vacancy rate for the municipality, in 2010, was 3.54%.

The historical population is given in the following chart:

== Politics ==
In the 2007 federal election the most popular party was the SVP which received 24.15% of the vote. The next three most popular parties were the Green Party (19.03%), the SP (18.47%) and the FDP (11.26%). In the federal election, a total of 204 votes were cast, and the voter turnout was 42.5%.

== Economy ==
As of 2010, Bretigny-sur-Morrens had an unemployment rate of 3.8%. As of 2008, there were 12 people employed in the primary economic sector and about 6 businesses involved in this sector. 25 people were employed in the secondary sector and there were 5 businesses in this sector. 72 people were employed in the tertiary sector, with 16 businesses in this sector. There were 322 residents of the municipality who were employed in some capacity, of which females made up 43.5% of the workforce.

In 2008 the total number of full-time equivalent jobs was 87. The number of jobs in the primary sector was 8, all of which were in agriculture. The number of jobs in the secondary sector was 24 of which 15 or (62.5%) were in manufacturing and 9 (37.5%) were in construction. The number of jobs in the tertiary sector was 55. In the tertiary sector; 26 or 47.3% were in wholesale or retail sales or the repair of motor vehicles, 6 or 10.9% were in a hotel or restaurant, 1 was in the information industry, 3 or 5.5% were technical professionals or scientists, 12 or 21.8% were in education and 3 or 5.5% were in health care.

In 2000, there were 29 workers who commuted into the municipality and 281 workers who commuted away. The municipality is a net exporter of workers, with about 9.7 workers leaving the municipality for every one entering. Of the working population, 4.7% used public transportation to get to work, and 80.7% used a private car.

== Religion ==
From the 2000 census, 157 or 27.9% were Roman Catholic, while 259 or 46.0% belonged to the Swiss Reformed Church. Of the rest of the population, there were 4 individuals (or about 0.71% of the population) who belonged to another Christian church. There were 4 (or about 0.71% of the population) who were Islamic. There was 1 person who was Buddhist and 1 individual who belonged to another church. 112 (or about 19.89% of the population) belonged to no church, are agnostic or atheist, and 25 individuals (or about 4.44% of the population) did not answer the question.

== Education ==
In Bretigny-sur-Morrens about 252 or (44.8%) of the population have completed non-mandatory upper secondary education, and 87 or (15.5%) have completed additional higher education (either university or a Fachhochschule). Of the 87 who completed tertiary schooling, 58.6% were Swiss men, 31.0% were Swiss women, 6.9% were non-Swiss men.

In the 2009/2010 school year there were a total of 101 students in the Bretigny-sur-Morrens school district. In the Vaud cantonal school system, two years of non-obligatory pre-school are provided by the political districts. During the school year, the political district provided pre-school care for a total of 296 children of which 96 children (32.4%) received subsidized pre-school care. The canton's primary school program requires students to attend for four years. There were 59 students in the municipal primary school program. The obligatory lower secondary school program lasts for six years and there were 38 students in those schools. There were also 4 students who were home schooled or attended another non-traditional school.

As of 2000, there were 15 students in Bretigny-sur-Morrens who came from another municipality, while 59 residents attended schools outside the municipality.
