= Vernand-Camarès railway station =

Railway station in Lausanne, Switzerland

Vernand-Camarès
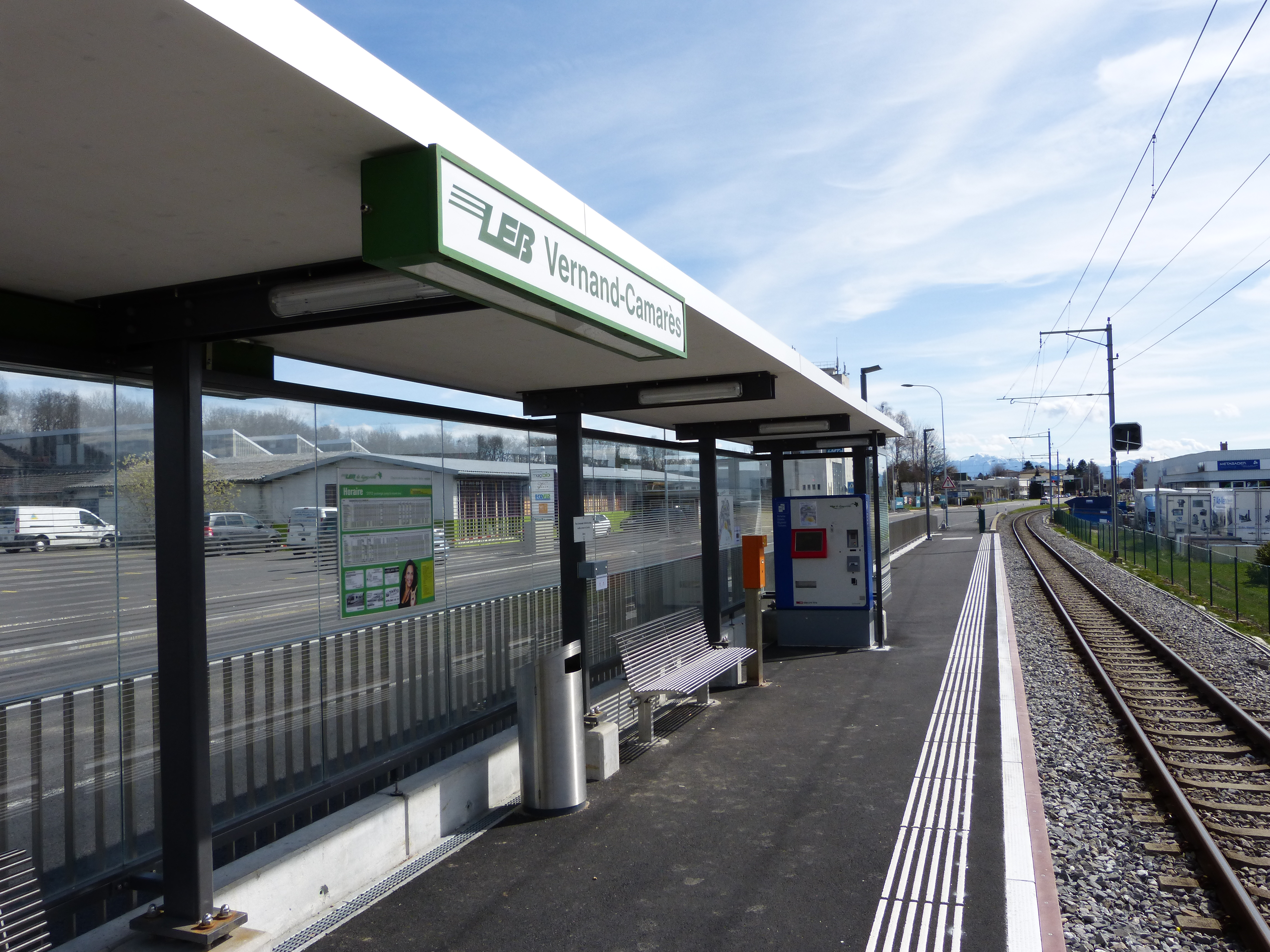
- The station platform in 2013

General information
- Location: Lausanne, Vaud; Switzerland
- Coordinates: 46°34′15″N 6°36′17″E
- Elevation: 598 m (1,962 ft)
- Owner: Chemin de fer Lausanne-Échallens-Bercher
- Line: Lausanne–Bercher line
- Distance: 6.7 km (4.2 mi) from Lausanne-Flon
- Platforms: 1 side platform
- Tracks: 1
- Train operators: Chemin de fer Lausanne-Échallens-Bercher

Construction
- Accessible: Yes

Other information
- Station code: 8501168 (VECA)
- Fare zone: 16 (mobilis)

History
- Opened: 1936

Services
Preceding station	LEB	Following station
Bel-Air LEB towards Echallens or Bercher	R20	Romanel-sur-Lausanne towards Lausanne-Flon
Location

Vernand-Camarès railway station (French: Halte de Vernand-Camarès) is a railway station in the Vernand exclave of the municipality of Lausanne, in the Swiss canton of Vaud. It is located on the 1,000 mm (3 ft 3 3/8 in) Lausanne–Bercher line of the Chemin de fer Lausanne-Échallens-Bercher (LEB). The station has a single track and platform.

The station opened in 1936, after the completion of the electrification of the railway. In 2012, the station was rebuilt with a new plaform and shelter on the opposite side of the track to the previous arrangement. The new platform lies between the railway track and the adjacent road, and is accessed by predestrian crossings across the road.

== Services ==
As of the December 2023 timetable change, the following services stop at Vernand-Camarès:

- Regio: service every fifteen minutes between Lausanne-Flon and Echallens, with every other train continuing from Echallens to Bercher.
