= Cheseaux railway station =

Railway station in Cheseaux-sur-Lausanne, Switzerland

Cheseaux
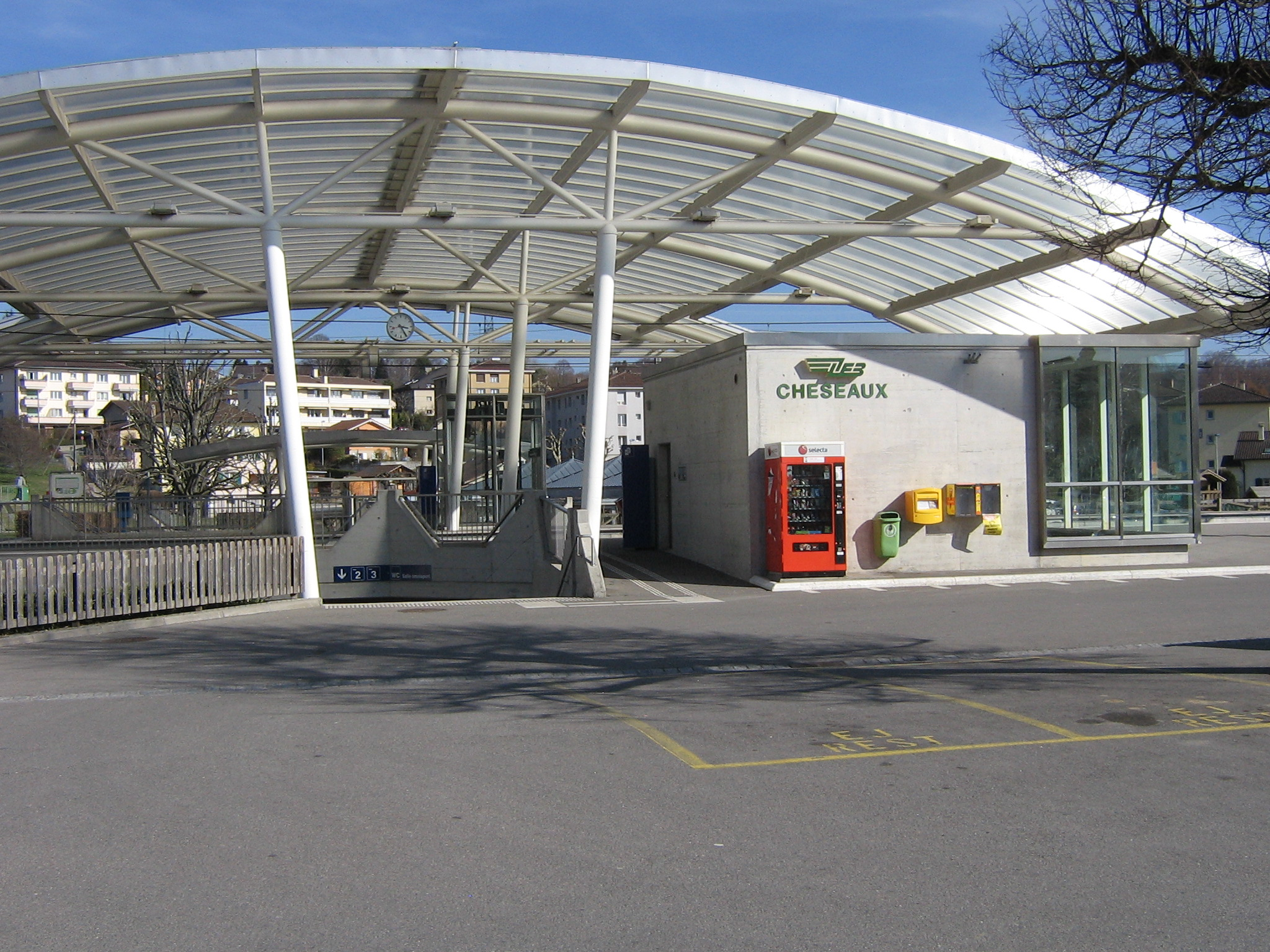
- The station entrance in 2011

General information
- Location: Cheseaux-sur-Lausanne, Vaud; Switzerland
- Coordinates: 46.5844°N 6.6060°E
- Elevation: 607 m (1,991 ft)
- Owner: Chemin de fer Lausanne-Échallens-Bercher
- Line: Lausanne–Bercher line
- Distance: 8.3 km (5.2 mi) from Lausanne-Flon
- Platforms: 1 island platform; 1 side platform
- Tracks: 3
- Train operators: Chemin de fer Lausanne-Échallens-Bercher
- Connections: TL bus route 54; PostBus routes 410 and 425

Construction
- Accessible: Yes

Other information
- Station code: 8501169 (CHES)
- Fare zone: 16 (mobilis)

History
- Opened: 5 November 1873
- Rebuilt: 20 June 2002
- Electrified: 7 December 1935

Services
Preceding station	LEB	Following station
Les Ripes towards Echallens or Bercher	R20	Bel-Air LEB towards Lausanne-Flon
Location

Cheseaux railway station (French: Gare de Cheseaux) is a railway station in the municipality of Cheseaux-sur-Lausanne, in the Swiss canton of Vaud. It is located on the 1,000 mm (3 ft 3 3/8 in) Lausanne–Bercher line of the Chemin de fer Lausanne-Échallens-Bercher (LEB).

The station has three through tracks and a siding, with a platform face alongside each through track provided by one side platform and one island platform. The island platform is accessed by a subway, with stairs and a lift. The station building is to a contemporary design, and the subway tiling includes stylized coats of arms of the municipalities on the line.

== History ==
Cheseaux station opened to service on 5 November 1873, as the provisional outer terminus of the first section of the LEB from Chauderon station. The line was extended to Échallens station in 1874, and Cheseaux became an intermediate station. The line through the station was electrified in 1935.

Between 1997 and 2001, major roadworks were carried out to create a bypass around the village center. As part of this work, the track between Bel-Air and Cheseaux station was relocated and bridges built over the Mèbre river and the Lausanne road. The station was rebuilt, with the pedestrian level crossing in the station replaced by a subway, a new building provided, and a lift and stairs installed. The rebuilt station reopened on 20 June 2002.

== Services ==
As of the December 2023 timetable change, the following services stop at Cheseaux:

- Regio: service every fifteen minutes between Lausanne-Flon and Echallens, with every other train continuing from Echallens to Bercher.

When the railway runs heritage steam services, Cheseaux is used as the southern terminus, as its track layout allows the heritage train to stand clear of regular services, and the locomotive to run around its train.

== Gallery ==
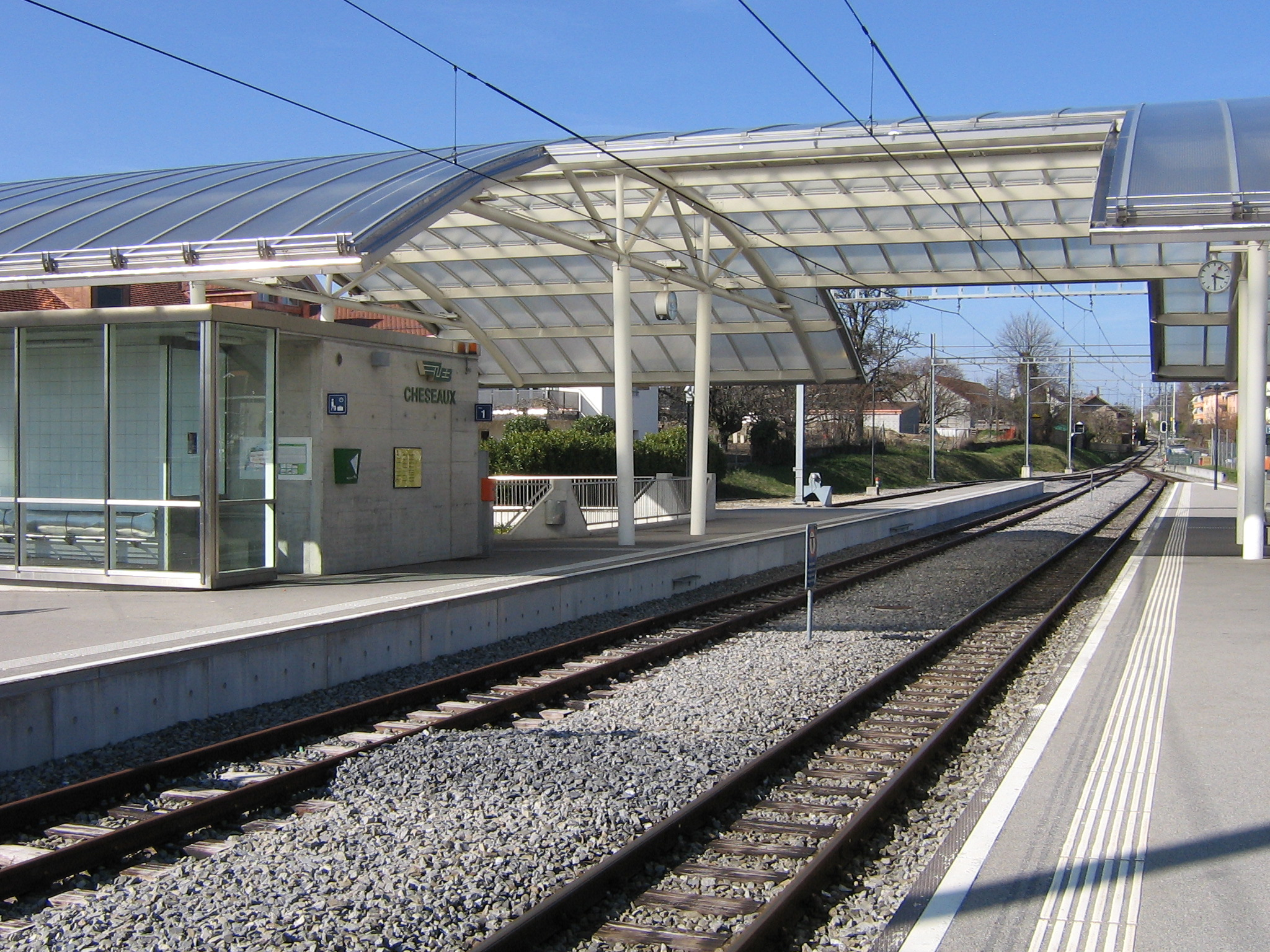
Station platforms looking towards Bercher

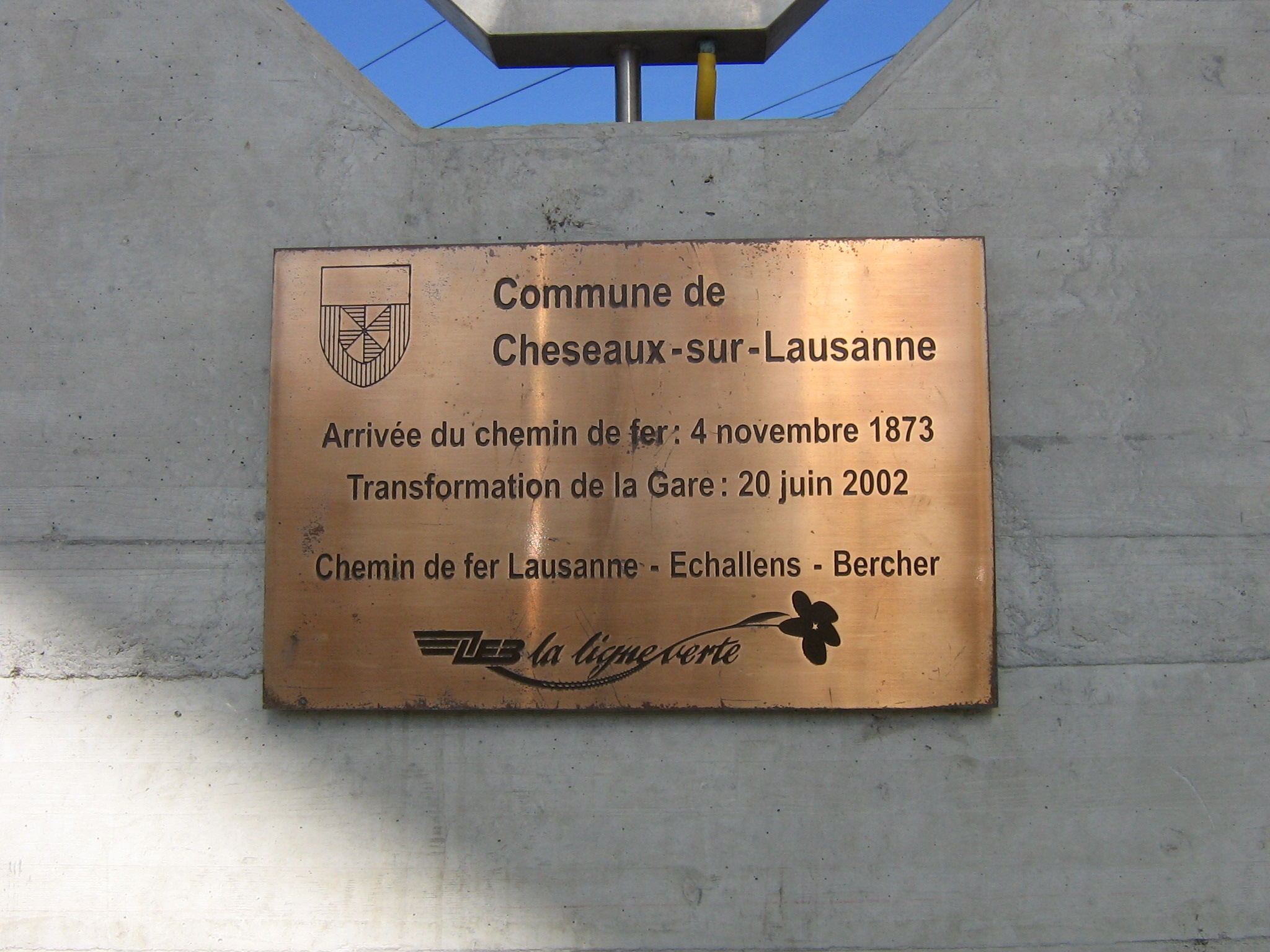
Plaque commemorating the station rebuild

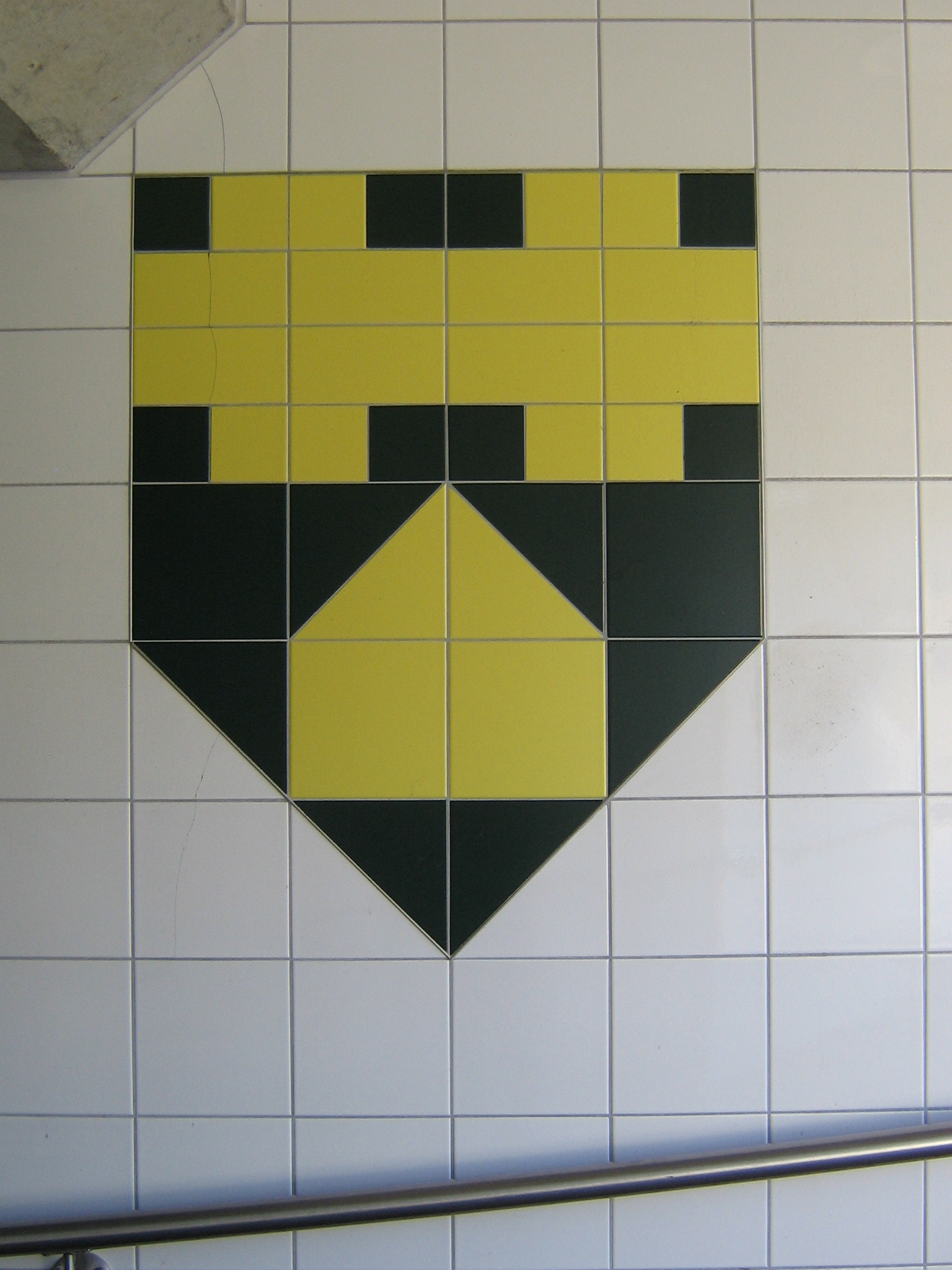
Stylised coat of arms of Assens in the subway
