= SKIDATA =

Austrian technology company

SKIDATA GmbH

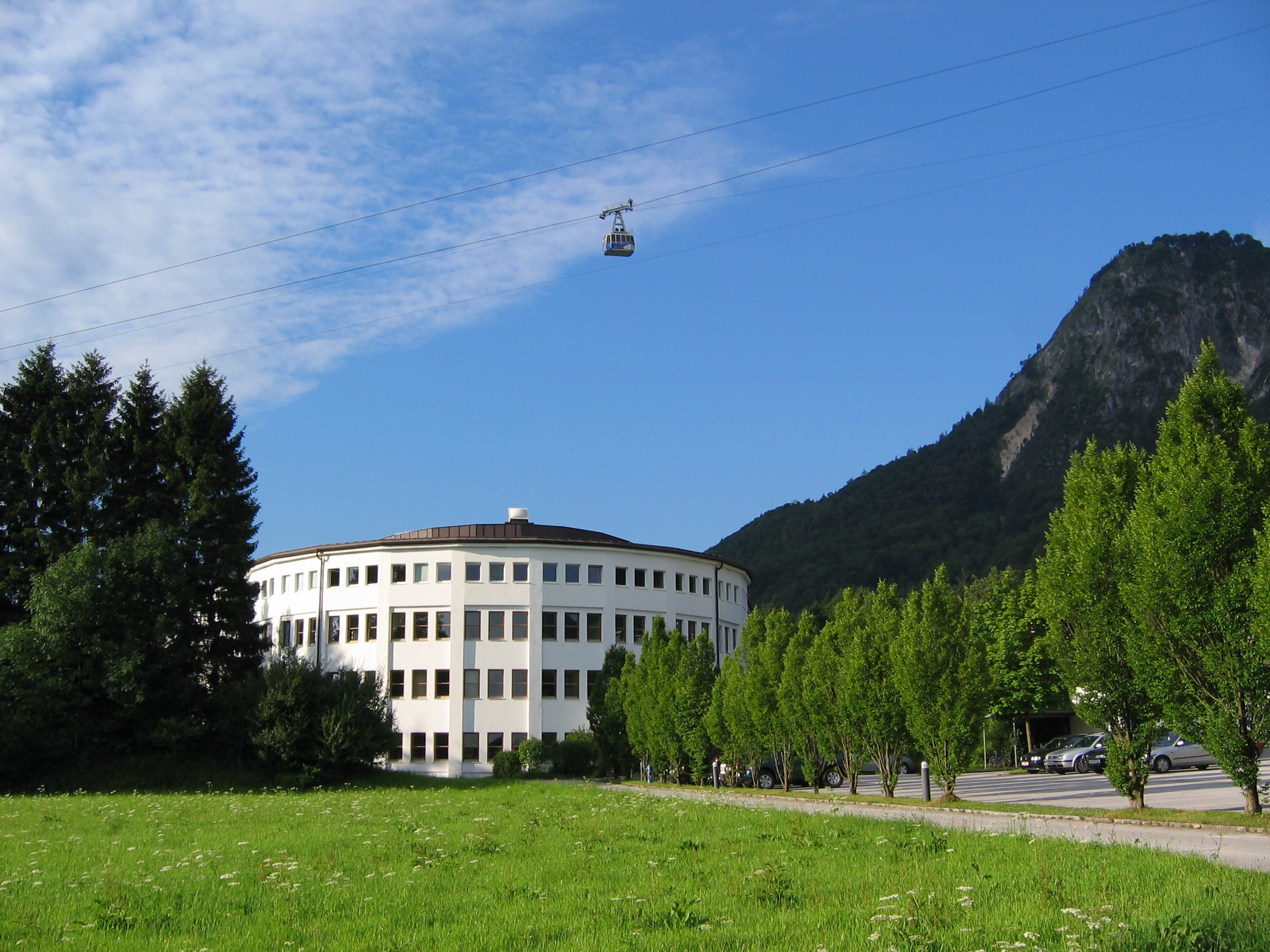
- Company type: Subsidiary
- Industry: Access systems
- Founded: 1977; 49 years ago
- Founder: Günther Walcher
- Headquarters: Grödig (Salzburg-Umgebung), Salzburg (state), Austria
- Key people: Thomas Moser (Head of SKIDATA); Diana Safta (CFO)
- Number of employees: approx. 1,500 (2025)
- Parent: ASSA ABLOY
- Divisions: Parking & Mobility; Sports & Entertainment
- Website: www.skidata.com

SKIDATA GmbH is an Austrian technology company that provides access and revenue management solutions for people and vehicles. Its systems are used in sectors including airports, car parks, urban areas, shopping malls, office buildings, educational institutions, hospitals, mountain destinations, hotels, stadiums and arenas. SKIDATA systems are installed in 100 countries worldwide, with around 11,000 installations internationally.

== History ==
=== Foundation ===
SKIDATA was founded in Grödig near Salzburg. In 1977, Günther Walcher developed the first printed personal ski tickets and a cash register for ski resorts, replacing the handwritten ski passes previously used. In 1979, the first cash register was implemented that used an electromagnetic stamp unit to print tickets. The System 320 was released in 1981, consisting of a register computer and an automated output device.

By the late 1980s, SKIDATA released the first access systems using hands-free RFID technology, known as the KeyCard. With this product, SKIDATA expanded its business beyond ski destinations to include parking management. The introduction of machines in 1989 allowed drivers to enter parking facilities and pay by credit card at the entry point. Düsseldorf Airport was equipped in 1991, followed by Munich Airport in 1992.

=== Expansion and partnerships ===
A collaboration with Swiss company Swatch in 1995 resulted in watches with integrated access authorization. Two years later, French chip card manufacturer Gemplus acquired a majority stake in SKIDATA. The Swiss Kudelski Group took over the company in 2001, expanding its market presence.

In the following years, SKIDATA expanded its sports and event ticketing business. For UEFA Euro 2004 in Portugal, SKIDATA equipped the four European Championship stadiums of Benfica Lisbon, FC Porto, Leiria and Faro with access systems.

Operations in India began in 2007 through a local partnership, leading to the formation of SKIDATA (India) Pvt Ltd in 2009 as a joint venture with Hinditron, a company with a software and IT history dating back to 1966. The company has since implemented car access systems at GMR Hyderabad International Airport, Bangalore International Airport, and Mumbai's Chhatrapati Shivaji International Airport, as well as commercial properties and malls. SKIDATA (India) Pvt Ltd has also provided access systems for ten Board of Control for Cricket in India (BCCI) stadiums and the Formula One circuit at Buddh International Circuit.

To expand its business in the United States, SKIDATA acquired a 25% stake in the software developer RTP (Resort Technology Partners LLC) in 2009. In 2010, SKIDATA fully equipped the parking facilities at Dallas/Fort Worth International Airport.

In April 2015, the company installed its 7,000th Parking.Logic system in 's-Hertogenbosch, Netherlands. That same year, an office opened in Tunisia. In addition, SKIDATA acquired 60% of Sentry Control Systems, a family-owned parking systems company in Van Nuys, California.

=== Recent developments and sale ===
The access system for Familypark was updated in March 2016. During the Intertraffic exhibition in Amsterdam the following month, the city of Amsterdam signed a contract with SKIDATA to equip 25 parking areas, covering a total of 25,000 parking spaces. A partnership with the Minnesota Vikings led to the creation of a Vikings App, which included digital ticketing, route finding, food and beverage ordering, merchandise ordering, push notifications, and videos. In May 2016, SKIDATA installed a new parking management system at Salzburg Airport. The system manages 3,200 parking spaces at the airport.

At the end of 2016, the existing car park systems in Miami Beach, Florida were replaced. As part of this contract, SKIDATA upgraded or installed new systems across 10 multi-level parking garages and 6,000 parking spaces.

In 2020, SKIDATA released Mobile Flow, a system in which the smartphone acts as a ski pass. In 2024, the system was implemented in the Levi ski resort in Finland. In 2024, sMove was introduced, an access system for skiers, mountain bikers, families and people with disabilities.

In February 2024, the Kudelski Group announced the sale of SKIDATA. In July 2024, a takeover by ASSA ABLOY was announced. The sale of SKIDATA to ASSA ABLOY was completed on 13 September 2024.

== Company structure ==
SKIDATA GmbH is based in Grödig, Austria, and has been part of ASSA ABLOY since the completion of the sale on 13 September 2024. As of 2025, the company employs approximately 1,500 people.

== Products and development ==
The business divisions are Parking & Mobility and Sports & Entertainment. The products and technologies include car park systems, access systems, data carriers and the associated software. The KeyCard and KeyTicket data carriers are used both as car park tickets and ski passes.

SKIDATA systems are used in 100 countries worldwide and account for around 11,000 installed systems internationally. Examples of sites using SKIDATA systems include the Zugspitze Railway in Bavaria, the Konjiam ski resort in South Korea, the Stadium of Light in Sunderland, England, Schiphol Airport in Amsterdam, and the Entertainment Quarter in Sydney, Australia.

The products and the technology underlying them are being further developed. In 2021, SKIDATA introduced the NFC ticket. NFC (near-field communication) tickets enable the contactless transfer of data over short distances, typically a few centimeters. In skiing, they are used to facilitate access to ski resorts by serving as digital ski passes on smartphones. Instead of using a physical card, skiers can keep their smartphone in their pocket, and the gate opens automatically.

SKIDATA also offers Mobility Suite as a Service, a subscription-based parking management system. It provides a hybrid parking software platform with an on-premise core and cloud-based services.
