= Morrens =

- Municipality
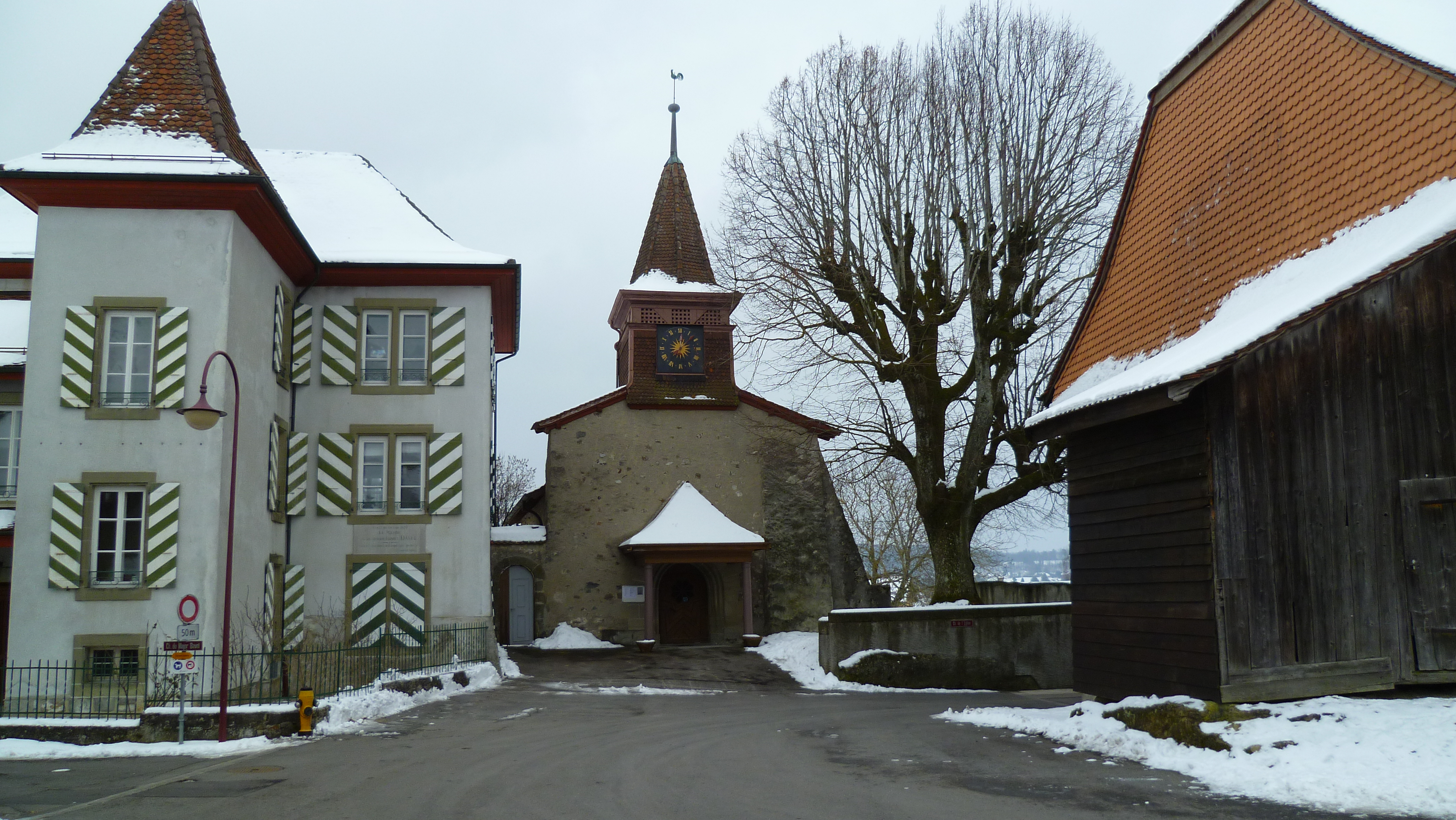

- Flag Coat of arms
- Location of Morrens
- Location within Switzerland Location within Canton of Vaud
- Coordinates: 46°35′N 6°38′E
- Country: Switzerland
- Canton: Vaud
- District: Gros-de-Vaud

Government
  - Mayor: Syndic

Area
  - Total: 3.66 km^{2} (1.41 sq mi)
- Elevation: 702 m (2,303 ft)

Population (December 2006)
  - Total: 973
  - Density: 266/km^{2} (689/sq mi)
- Time zone: UTC+01:00 (CET)
  - Summer (DST): UTC+02:00 (CEST)
- Postal code: 1054
- SFOS number: 5527
- ISO 3166 code: CH-VD
- Surrounded by: Assens, Bretigny-sur-Morrens, Cheseaux-sur-Lausanne, Cugy, Vaud, Etagnières, Lausanne
- Website: www.morrens.ch

Morrens (French pronunciation: [mɔʁɑ̃]) is a municipality in the district of Gros-de-Vaud in the canton of Vaud in Switzerland.

== History ==
Morrens is first mentioned in 1147 as Morrens.

== Geography ==
Morrens has an area, as of 2009, of 3.66 square kilometers (1.41 sq mi). Of this area, 2.41 km^{2} (0.93 sq mi) or 65.8% is used for agricultural purposes, while 0.73 km^{2} (0.28 sq mi) or 19.9% is forested. Of the rest of the land, 0.56 km^{2} (0.22 sq mi) or 15.3% is settled (buildings or roads).

Of the built up area, housing and buildings made up 9.8% and transportation infrastructure made up 4.6%. Out of the forested land, 17.8% of the total land area is heavily forested and 2.2% is covered with orchards or small clusters of trees. Of the agricultural land, 48.9% is used for growing crops and 15.6% is pastures, while 1.4% is used for orchards or vine crops.

The municipality was part of the Echallens District until it was dissolved on 31 August 2006, and Morrens became part of the new district of Gros-de-Vaud.

It consists of the village of Morrens and the hamlet of Les Biolettes. Since the 1970s it has been part of the agglomeration of Lausanne.

== Coat of arms ==
The blazon of the municipal coat of arms is Per bend sinistre: 1. Or, Semi-Wolf rampant issuant Sable langued Gules; 2. Or, three Bends Sable.

== Demographics ==
Morrens has a population (as of December 2020) of 1,154. As of 2008, 11.6% of the population are resident foreign nationals. Over the last 10 years (1999–2009 ) the population has changed at a rate of 12.4%. It has changed at a rate of 6.4% due to migration and at a rate of 5.8% due to births and deaths.

Most of the population (as of 2000) speaks French (802 or 90.3%), with German being second most common (55 or 6.2%) and Italian being third (8 or 0.9%).

Of the population in the municipality 159 or about 17.9% were born in Morrens and lived there in 2000. There were 416 or 46.8% who were born in the same canton, while 169 or 19.0% were born somewhere else in Switzerland, and 114 or 12.8% were born outside of Switzerland.

In 2008 there were 10 live births to Swiss citizens and 3 births to non-Swiss citizens, and in same time span there were 6 deaths of Swiss citizens and 1 non-Swiss citizen death. Ignoring immigration and emigration, the population of Swiss citizens increased by 4 while the foreign population increased by 2. There were 4 Swiss men and 4 Swiss women who emigrated from Switzerland. At the same time, there was 1 non-Swiss man and 3 non-Swiss women who immigrated from another country to Switzerland. The total Swiss population change in 2008 (from all sources, including moves across municipal borders) was a decrease of 8 and the non-Swiss population remained the same. This represents a population growth rate of -0.8%.

The age distribution, as of 2009, in Morrens is; 124 children or 12.6% of the population are between 0 and 9 years old and 113 teenagers or 11.5% are between 10 and 19. Of the adult population, 88 people or 9.0% of the population are between 20 and 29 years old. 121 people or 12.3% are between 30 and 39, 167 people or 17.0% are between 40 and 49, and 139 people or 14.2% are between 50 and 59. The senior population distribution is 116 people or 11.8% of the population are between 60 and 69 years old, 77 people or 7.8% are between 70 and 79, there are 35 people or 3.6% who are between 80 and 89, and there is 1 person who is 90 and older.

As of 2000, there were 338 people who were single and never married in the municipality. There were 461 married individuals, 41 widows or widowers and 48 individuals who are divorced.

As of 2000, there were 345 private households in the municipality, and an average of 2.5 persons per household. There were 82 households that consist of only one person and 24 households with five or more people. Out of a total of 358 households that answered this question, 22.9% were households made up of just one person and there were 2 adults who lived with their parents. Of the rest of the households, there are 108 married couples without children, 132 married couples with children There were 15 single parents with a child or children. There were 6 households that were made up of unrelated people and 13 households that were made up of some sort of institution or another collective housing.

In 2000 there were 173 single family homes (or 66.8% of the total) out of a total of 259 inhabited buildings. There were 50 multi-family buildings (19.3%), along with 28 multi-purpose buildings that were mostly used for housing (10.8%) and 8 other use buildings (commercial or industrial) that also had some housing (3.1%). Of the single family homes 16 were built before 1919, while 17 were built between 1990 and 2000. The greatest number of single family homes (48) were built between 1971 and 1980. The most multi-family homes (14) were built between 1981 and 1990 and the next most (12) were built between 1961 and 1970.

In 2000 there were 378 apartments in the municipality. The most common apartment size was 4 rooms of which there were 106. There were 16 single room apartments and 160 apartments with five or more rooms. Of these apartments, a total of 339 apartments (89.7% of the total) were permanently occupied, while 34 apartments (9.0%) were seasonally occupied and 5 apartments (1.3%) were empty. As of 2009, the construction rate of new housing units was 2 new units per 1000 residents. The vacancy rate for the municipality, in 2010, was 0%.

The historical population is given in the following chart:

== Politics ==
In the 2007 federal election the most popular party was the SP which received 24.49% of the vote. The next three most popular parties were the SVP (23.13%), the Green Party (13%) and the FDP (12.26%). In the federal election, a total of 331 votes were cast, and the voter turnout was 48.5%.

== Economy ==
As of 2010, Morrens had an unemployment rate of 3%. As of 2008, there were 9 people employed in the primary economic sector and about 4 businesses involved in this sector. 18 people were employed in the secondary sector and there were 3 businesses in this sector. 87 people were employed in the tertiary sector, with 27 businesses in this sector. There were 461 residents of the municipality who were employed in some capacity, of which females made up 44.5% of the workforce.

In 2008 the total number of full-time equivalent jobs was 90. The number of jobs in the primary sector was 7, all of which were in agriculture. The number of jobs in the secondary sector was 17 of which 16 or (94.1%) were in manufacturing and 1 was in construction. The number of jobs in the tertiary sector was 66. In the tertiary sector; 18 or 27.3% were in wholesale or retail sales or the repair of motor vehicles, 3 or 4.5% were in the movement and storage of goods, 4 or 6.1% were in a hotel or restaurant, 1 was the insurance or financial industry, 11 or 16.7% were technical professionals or scientists, 10 or 15.2% were in education.

In 2000, there were 63 workers who commuted into the municipality and 376 workers who commuted away. The municipality is a net exporter of workers, with about 6.0 workers leaving the municipality for every one entering. Of the working population, 6.5% used public transportation to get to work, and 76.4% used a private car.

== Religion ==
From the 2000 census, 274 or 30.9% were Roman Catholic, while 418 or 47.1% belonged to the Swiss Reformed Church. Of the rest of the population, there were 5 members of an Orthodox church (or about 0.56% of the population), and there were 28 individuals (or about 3.15% of the population) who belonged to another Christian church. There were 2 (or about 0.23% of the population) who were Islamic. There were 2 individuals who were Buddhist and 2 individuals who belonged to another church. 128 (or about 14.41% of the population) belonged to no church, are agnostic or atheist, and 40 individuals (or about 4.50% of the population) did not answer the question.

== Education ==
In Morrens about 352 or (39.6%) of the population have completed non-mandatory upper secondary education, and 172 or (19.4%) have completed additional higher education (either university or a Fachhochschule). Of the 172 who completed tertiary schooling, 61.6% were Swiss men, 23.3% were Swiss women, 8.1% were non-Swiss men and 7.0% were non-Swiss women.

In the 2009/2010 school year there were a total of 132 students in the Morrens (VD) school district. In the Vaud cantonal school system, two years of non-obligatory pre-school are provided by the political districts. During the school year, the political district provided pre-school care for a total of 296 children of which 96 children (32.4%) received subsidized pre-school care. The canton's primary school program requires students to attend for four years. There were 79 students in the municipal primary school program. The obligatory lower secondary school program lasts for six years and there were 48 students in those schools. There were also 5 students who were home schooled or attended another non-traditional school.

As of 2000, there were 24 students in Morrens who came from another municipality, while 107 residents attended schools outside the municipality.
