= Kudelski Group =

Swiss company

Kudelski SA
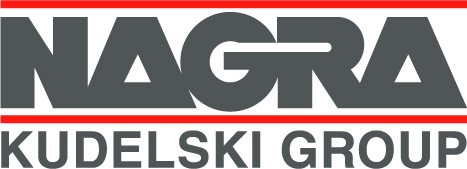
- Company type: Public
- Traded as: SIX: KUD
- Industry: Digital TV, public access, cybersecurity, Internet of things
- Founded: 1951; 75 years ago
- Founder: Stefan Kudelski
- Headquarters: Cheseaux-sur-Lausanne, Switzerland and Phoenix, Arizona, United States of America
- Key people: André Kudelski (CEO); Mauro Saladini (CFO); Morten Solbakken (COO); Nancy Goldberg (CMO)
- Revenue: 778'800 kUSD (2021)
- Number of employees: 3233 (2022)
- Website: www.nagra.com

Kudelski SA is a Swiss company that sells digital television access and management systems, content protection solutions, cybersecurity solutions, Internet of Things products and public access infrastructure. The company is headquartered in Cheseaux-sur-Lausanne and Phoenix, Arizona. Kudelski's first successful product was the Nagra tape recorder, developed by founder and Polish-born researcher Stefan Kudelski.

André Kudelski, the son of founder Stefan Kudelski, became the chief executive officer in 1991. The rest of the executive board includes chief financial officer Mauro Saladini, chief operating officer Morten Solbakken, and executive vice president Nancy Goldberg.

== History ==
Kudelski Group was founded in 1951 by Stefan Kudelski, while he was an engineering student at the Swiss Federal Institute of Technology (École polytechnique fédérale de Lausanne - EPFL). The company's first product was the Nagra I, a reel-to-reel tape recorder, which weighed 11 pounds and measured 5"x7"x12" (roughly the size of a shoe box). It was succeeded by the Nagra II in 1953, which improved sound quality with additional mechanical filters.

Kudelski released the Nagra III tape recorder in 1958, which could synchronize sound with the frames on a reel of film, which became popular for on-location filming. It was used by directors including François Truffaut, Jean-Luc Godard, and D. A. Pennebaker. The Nagra SN, or Série Noir, was released in 1970, which was originally designed for use by the United States Secret Service. Kudelski later expanded into television services, providing its access control system for pay television to Canal+ in 1989.

André Kudelski replaced his father, Stefan Kudelski, as chief executive officer in 1991 following pressure from investors.

In 2001, Kudelski Group entered the Public Access sector with the acquisition of SKIDATA, an Austrian company specialised in access systems for people and vehicles.

OpenTV, an internet and digital television company was fully acquired by the Kudelski Group on March 29, 2010.

Kudelski Group entered the cybersecurity sector with the creation in 2012 of Kudelski Security. In order to identify and remediate cyber-attacks, Kudelski Security operates Cyber Fusion Centers in Switzerland, Spain and the United States.

In 2016, the company opened a second headquarters in Phoenix, Arizona. The same year, it launched Insight, the Group's artificial intelligence and big data business performance platform.

Kudelski IoT was created in 2017, together with the launch of the Group's Internet of Things Security Center of Excellence to address demand for increased protection of connected devices.

== Subsidiaries ==
- Nagravision is a developer of conditional access systems for cable and satellite television, and a number of other companies involved in the audio, Internet security, digital television, public access and smart card industries.
- OpenTV is a software company for interactive and digital television. Its primary business is the sale of set-top-box operating systems and software as well as digital advertising products.
- SmarDTV is designing Set-Top boxes and CAM Modules.
- Kudelski Security is an international cybersecurity company, with headquarters in Cheseaux-sur-Lausanne and Phoenix, Arizona.
- Kudelski IoT is an international company active in the Internet of Things (IoT) sector, with headquarters in Cheseaux-sur-Lausanne and Phoenix, Arizona.

== Former Businesses ==
- SKIDATA, headquartered in Austria, manufactures access control systems and software for their management. SKIDATA provides turnstiles, admission ticketing, electronic ticketing systems, boom barriers, and other pedestrian and vehicular access control devices to ski resorts, parking lots, amusement parks, shopping malls, airports, and municipalities, among others. The segment was sold to Assa Abloy in July 2024.
