= Nagra =

Series of audio recorders produced by Kudelski SA

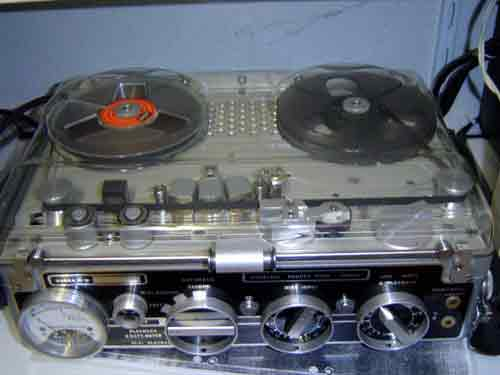
Nagra III with Pilottone

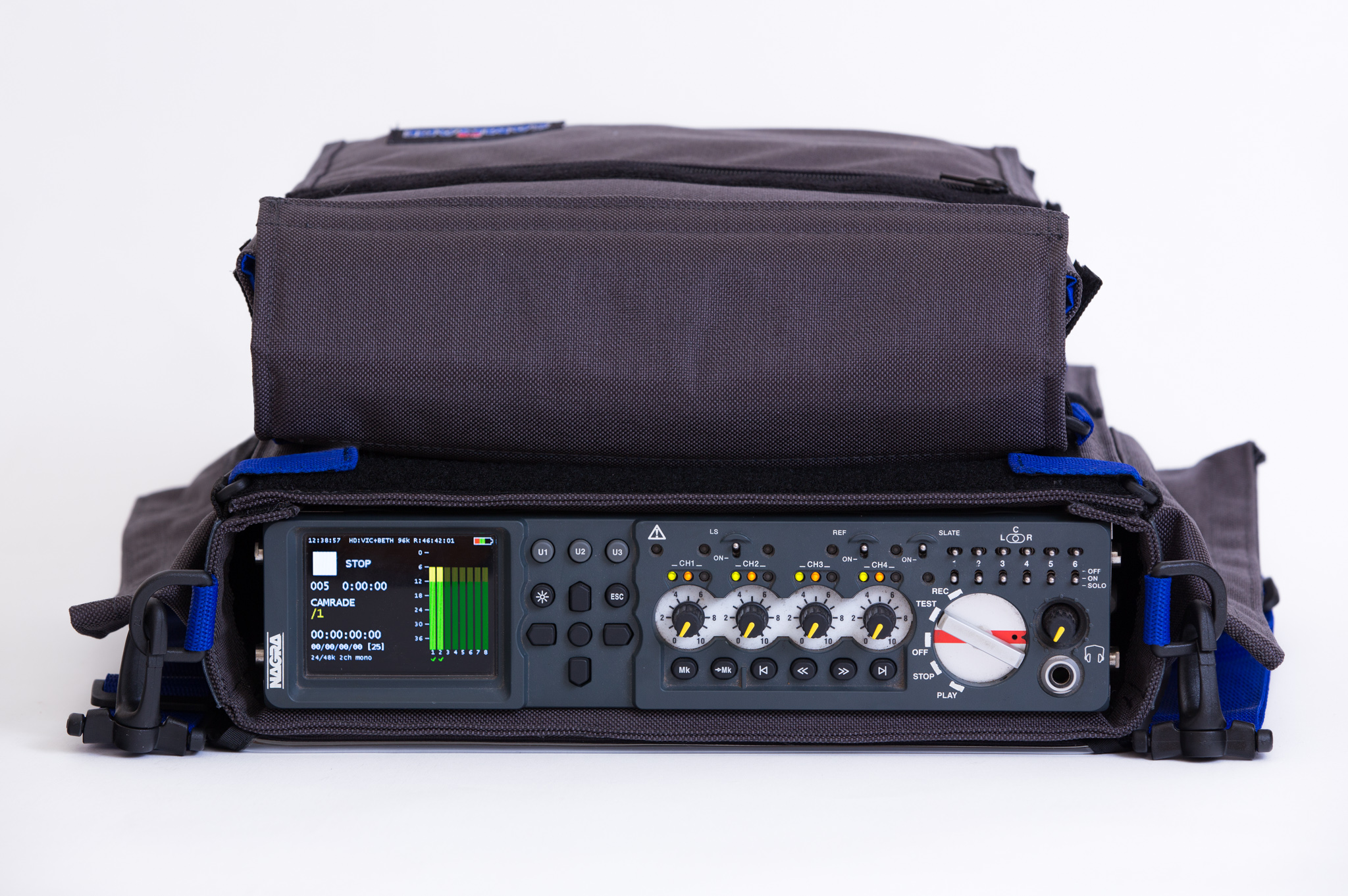
Nagra VI

Nagra is a Swiss brand of portable audio recorders first introduced in 1951. In 1997, the company expanded into new markets by launching a range of high-end equipment designed for the audiophile community.

Originally a product of the Kudelski Group, Nagra recorders are now developed, produced and sold by independently owned company Audio Technology Switzerland S.A., based in Romanel-sur-Lausanne.

== History ==
The machines were initially designed by Polish inventor Stefan Kudelski, and his company won numerous technical awards for their precision and reliability. Nagra means "[it will] record" in Polish, Kudelski's native language.

Nagra-brand tape recorders were the de facto standard sound recording systems for motion picture and (non-video) single-camera television production from the 1960s until the 1990s.

== Synchronization ==
Originally, a physical sync lead tethered the Nagra recorder to the camera (putting a pulse from the camera onto the tape), to ensure any fluctuations in the tape were accounted for. After the introduction of crystal sync, the tape recorder could operate separately from the camera, each having a separate accurate clock guaranteed to stay in sync with the other, allowing the sound recordist significantly more freedom of movement. This was commonly known as double system sound.

== Models ==
Nagra recorders are identified by a number that indicates their technological generation and features:

- NAGRA I – The very first prototype with clockwork motor and miniature tubes, appearing in 1951. Two were sold to Radio Genève.
- NAGRA II – The first production model, miniature tubes equipped, clockwork motor, which appeared in 1953. In 1953, in a new facility, Nagra began the production of the Nagra II, a Nagra I with the option to have an external modulometer (a type of VU meter) in the sidewall. Later the Nagra II was improved to the Nagra II b and in 1955, to the Nagra II c (a Nagra II with some improvements in electronics and using the first Nagra printed circuit).
- NAGRA II CI – The second generation fitted with printed circuit boards replacing chassis wiring, appearing in 1955.
- Nagra III NP – The first Nagra usable for film work, appearing in 1958. This was a monaural recorder, with the "NP" denoting the Neopilot sync.
- Nagra IV-L – Monaural, Neopilot sync, featuring two microphone inputs and a built-in audio limiter. Introduced in 1968. The unreliable head mounts were redesigned three times with the final design being designated the Nagra 4.2
- Nagra 4.2 – Same as the IV-L, but added powering for microphones and built-in equalizers. Introduced in 1972. In the 1980s one could upgrade a 4.2 to record SMPTE timecode.

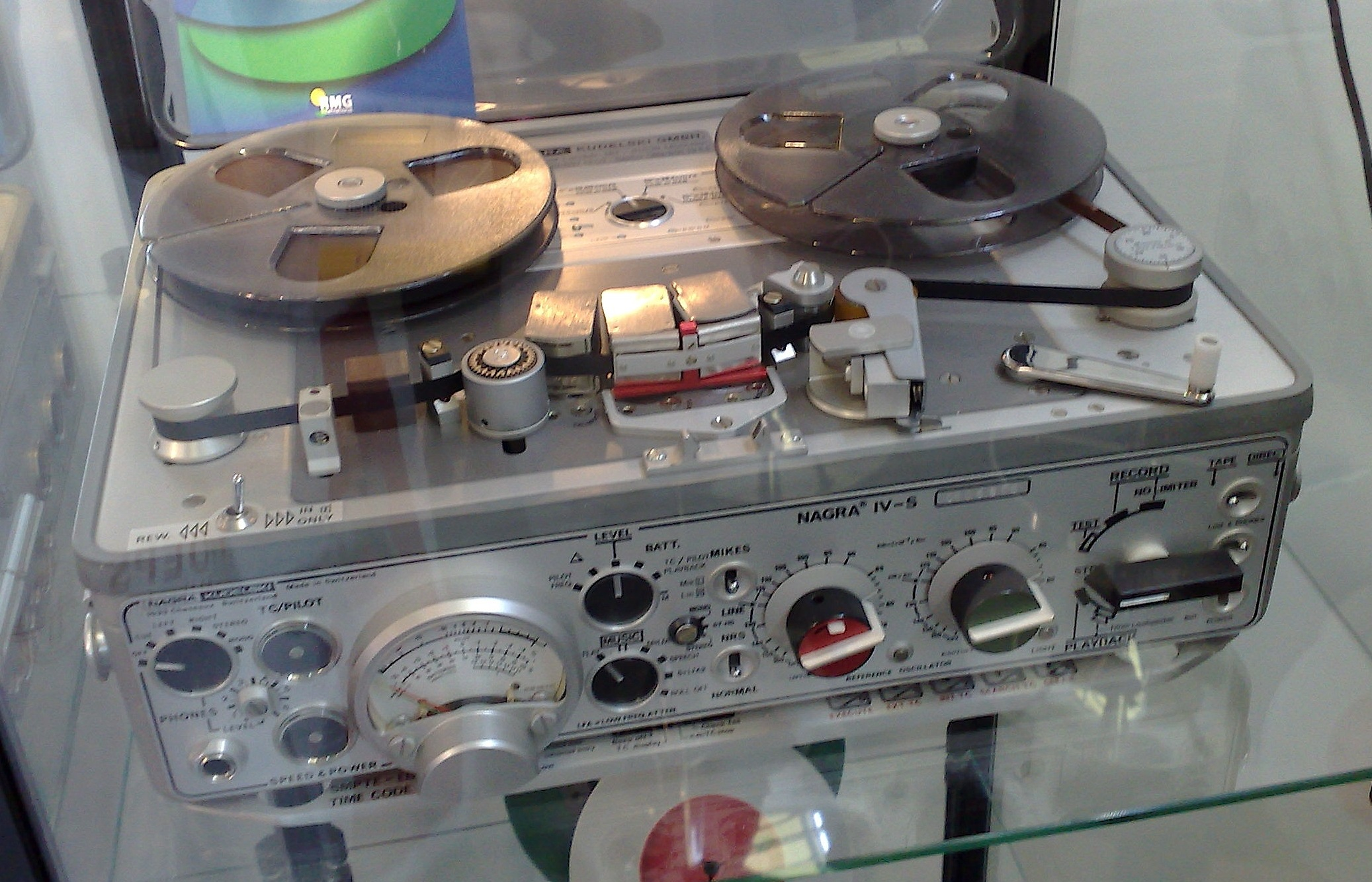
Nagra IV-STC (with timecode)

- Nagra IV-S – Stereo Nagra, recording two-track stereo. It had dual level pots, limiters, and equalizer presets. It was introduced in 1971. It originally employed a 14 kHz sync signal that is not compatible with the earlier Neopilot sync. This signal is recorded employing FM modulation on a third or center track that could simultaneously be employed as an additional but lower quality "cue" track.
- Nagra IV-STC – In 1984 Nagra introduced timecode support. With such support an IV-S became an STC with a pull out tray.

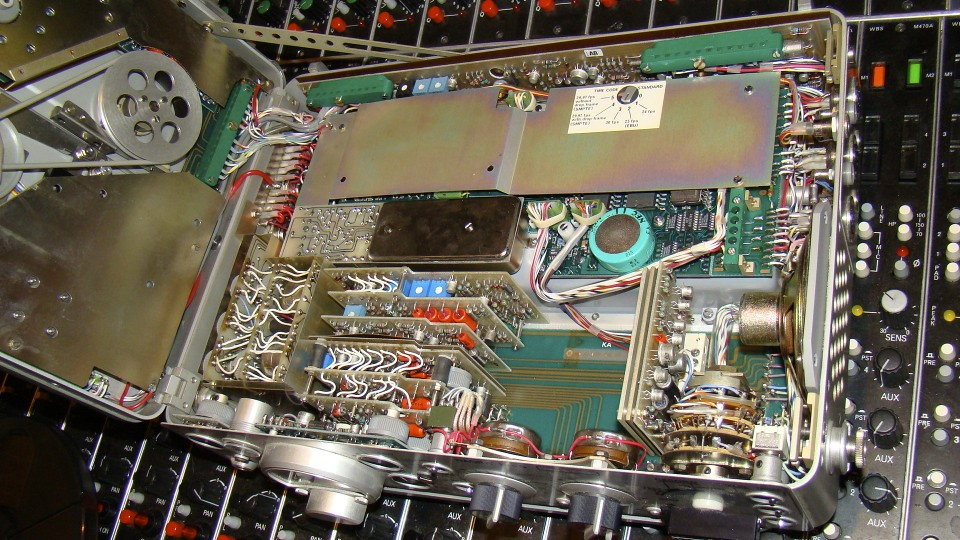
Nagra IV-STC internal

- Nagra IV-SJ – Stereo Nagra for instrumentation and logging. Pots are replaced with switches to set gain in precise steps, no limiters, and when present, the microphone inputs are for high-voltage unbalanced instrumentation mics rather than low impedance balanced with T-power and phantom.
- Nagra IS – In 1974 the Nagra IS (nicknamed Idioten-Sicher or "idiot proof" by its users) was introduced. The Nagra IS was a small-bodied recorder, to be used in both film- and broadcast applications. Focus was on simple operation and lower weight than the IV/4-series recorders. It only supported 5 inch reels. Special versions of the IS called ISN and ISS could play back the 3,81 mm wide tape used with Nagra SN recorders. The IS is the only model derived from the original Nagra III to use three motors for tape transport. Supply and take up spools have their own motors.
- NAGRA E – A simple, single-speed (7.5ips), mono recorder aimed at radio reporters was introduced in 1976.

In addition to these field recorders, Kudelski S.A. produced a studio recorder called the Nagra T-Audio, designed mainly for use in telecines for transferring dailies. All of the above machines use 1/4" tape.

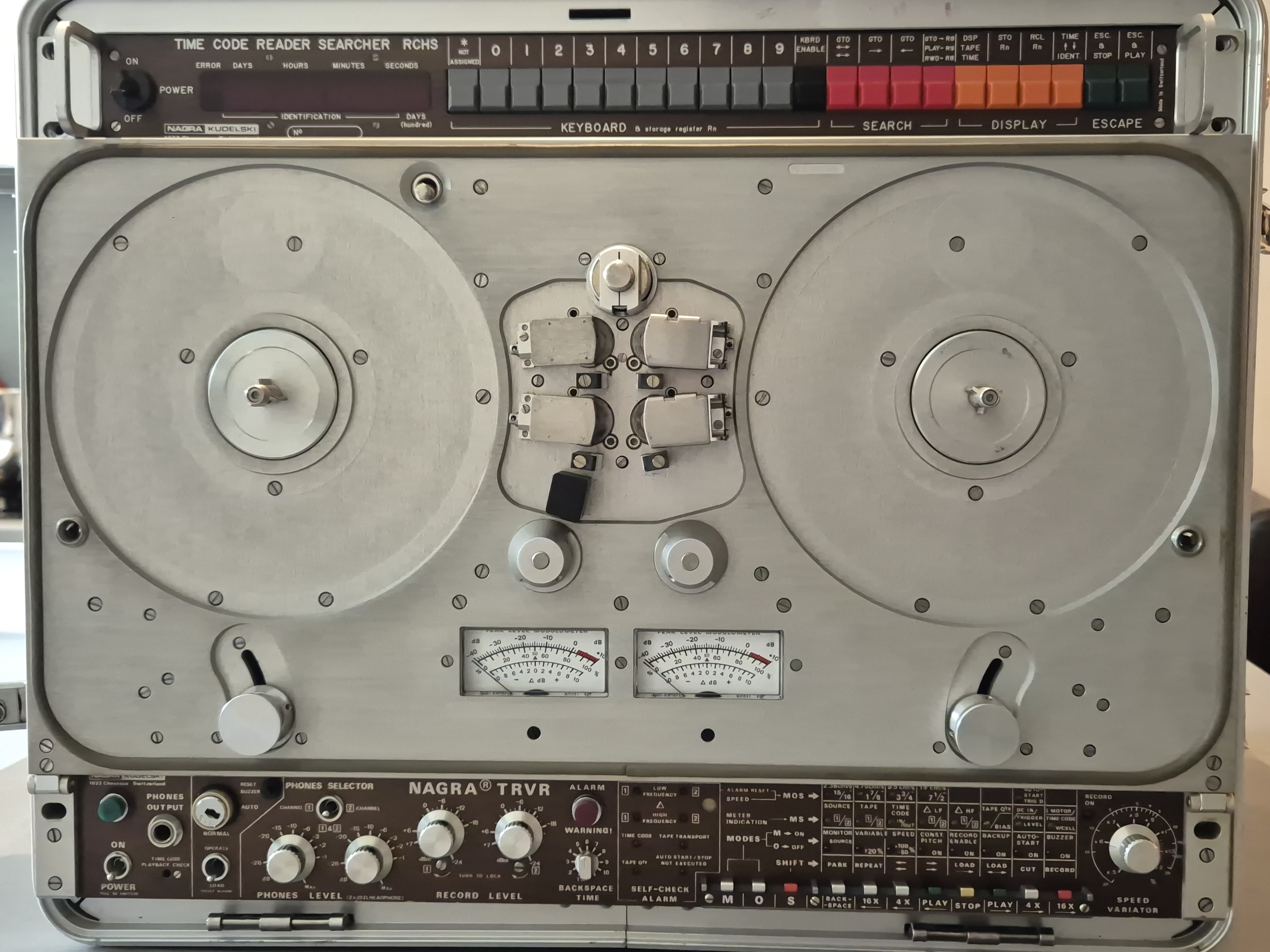
- NAGRA TRVR – A rare stereo machine designed with the 19" rack format. It is a reel to reel 1/4" tape recorder designed for automatic long recording using the four standard tape speeds. The machine is equipped with an automatic start recording device actuated by the input signal and, at the tape end, allows automatic connection to another machine that begins recording on a new tape without loss of signal. When equipped with the accessory RCHS, Time Code Reader Searcher, the machine allows high speed search of a particular sequence when its time code had been entered by the keyboard or from its memory. These machines were used by intelligence services of several countries and logging service of radio stations.

=== Série Noire ===
Kudelski SA also produced a series of miniaturised reel-to-reel recorders using a special tape (width 3.81 millimetres (0.150 in)), slightly larger than the conventional 1/8" cassette tape. These machines are referred to as SN (for Série Noire) and production was originally ordered by President Kennedy for the United States Secret Service.

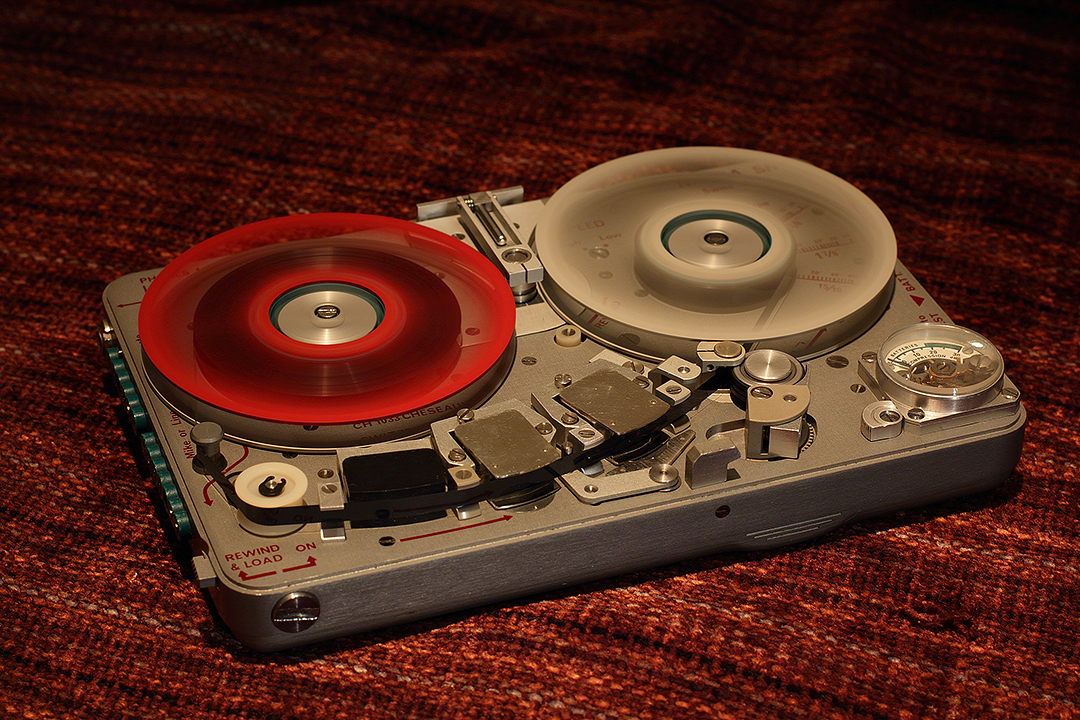
Nagra SNS

The SN range comprises the following models:

- Nagra SNN – monaural, full-track, main tape speed of 3-3/4 ips.
- Nagra SNS – monaural, half-track, main tape speed of 15/16 ips (multiplying the recording length at the expense of the dynamic range and high-frequency response).
- Nagra SNST – stereo, intended more for security service "two microphones to record two different people talking" usage than hi-fi usage due to technical limitations.
- Nagra SNST-R – full hi-fi stereo.

A special version of the SN using unique tape cassettes was made in cooperation with JBR Technology and widely used by US domestic intelligence agencies.

=== Digital recorders ===
The Nagra IV-STC was the standard for film and classical music recording until the mid-1990s, when DAT recorders became reliable enough to use in the field. In response, Kudelski produced two digital recorders to compete:

- Nagra D – 4 channel PCM digital audio recorder. Instead of recording to the DAT format, the D used a digital reel-to-reel format using a helical scan head and 1/4" tape on 5" and 7" reels. The tape is identical to that used on Digital Audio Stationary Head machines such as the Sony PCM-3202 and Mitsubishi X-86 series. The unique format, combined with its heavy weight, made it somewhat unpopular with many production sound mixers, but year after year many films were completed with Nagra Ds (and the newer 24-bit/96 kHz Nagra DII). Despite some popularity in the late 1990s, the Nagra D and DII are a rarity on US films as of the mid-2000s.
- Nagra ARES C and ARES- PP – In 1995 the ARES-C recorder was introduced with the aim of replacing the ageing NAGRA-E portable tape recorder in the broadcast market. Based on a tape-less platform using PCMCIA computer memory cards as a recording medium, the ARES-C offers a recorder, editor and ISDN codec in the same portable, battery operated box. Accepted by radio stations around the world it formed the basis of a new generation of digital recorders for the NAGRA company. After the success of NAGRA D digital tape recorder, the NAGRA ARES was the first NAGRA digital tape-less recorder. The ARES C-PP was a studio 19" (2U) rack-mountable version of the ARES-C and gave broadcasters a full system for journalistic transmission. The C-PP was extensively used in broadcast OB vans and small radio studios. Nagra ARES models use PC (formerly PCMCIA) Cards for data storage, Flash RAM Type I and II (max 192 MB).

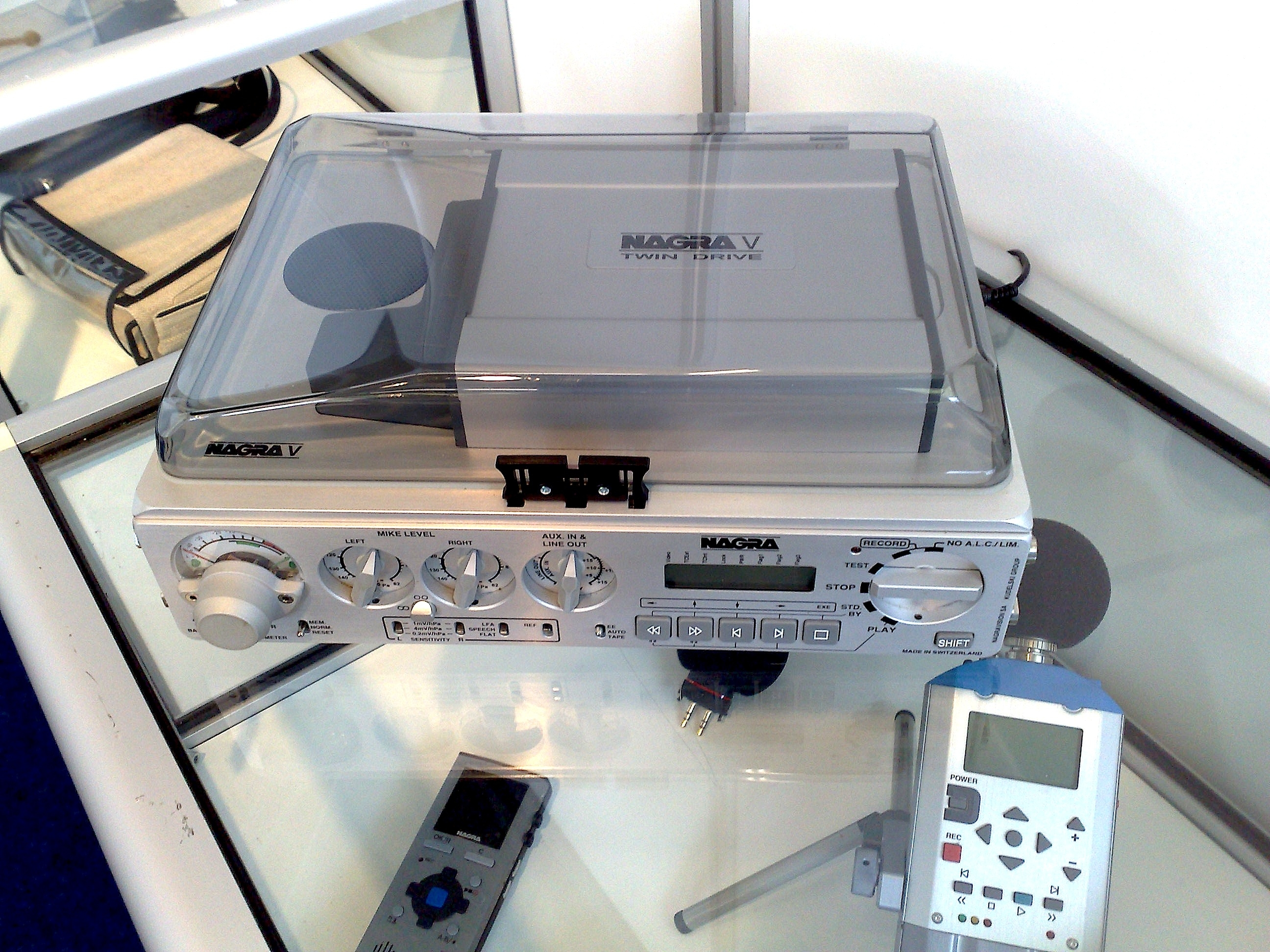
Nagra V

- Nagra V – 2 channel PCM digital audio recorder, 24-bit/96 kHz, removable hard drive based recorder with timecode support. Has the additional benefits of being very light, and producing files easily processed by non-linear editing systems. Originally released with the Orb removable hard drive system, which proved unreliable. The drive system was replaced by Agate Technology's DN-Boy system in October 2002. Unlike the analog Nagras, the Nagra V digital recorders have not been adopted as readily for the motion picture and TV industries, which mostly use competing digital multi-track machines from manufacturers such as Aaton's Cantar, Fostex, Sound Devices and Zaxcom.
- Nagra VI – Released in 2008, originally as a 6 channel recorder and later upgraded to 8 channels (six inputs plus two mix), the Nagra VI was touted as "the natural successor to the NAGRA-D / DII multi-track digital recorders" and is equipped with four microphone preamps, two line level inputs which double as dual digital inputs (AES/EBU and S/PDIF), with input channels equipped with low pass filters, limiters, variable mic sensitivity settings and variable voltage phantom power. Rotary encoders and soft buttons allow the user to program the function of the main audio pots and shortcut keys. The VI records to an internal 2.5" hard drive with compact flash as a backup or for transfers, has full timecode capability and meta-data entry for audio files and digital sound reports. Records 24-bit/96 kHz as well as MP3 formats. The VI was released to compete with multitrack machines from other manufacturers, although it has still not regained its original market share in production sound, as higher channel counts and smaller size and weight become more available at less cost.
- Nagra Seven – Since 2013, this 2 track recorder has been designed as the successor to the Nagra LB, ARES-C, ARES-BB+ and Nagra V recorders. It is a flexible device and can be adapted to a multitude of specific applications depending on the internal options installed. Based on an extremely high performance, simple to operate platform the addition internal ISDN or SMPTE/EBU time code boards adapt it to either the broadcast or film / TV markets. Optional WiFi/3G, WiFi/4G, internal editor and audio compressions are also available, to further dedicate the device for particular applications.

== Hi-fi ==
In 1997, Nagra launched the PL-P, a vacuum tube phono preamplifier, beginning a range of high-end audio equipment. The range is intended for audiophile consumers as opposed to exclusively the professional equipment manufactured hitherto. Since then, the range has grown steadily and have added tubes and mosfet amplifiers, CD players, other pre-amps and DACs.

== Appearances in Films ==
Nagra audio recorders have made appearances in numerous films, including:

- Help! (1965) - Nagra III, recording The Beatles song, I Need You, on windy Salisbury Plain
- Klute (1971) – Nagra SN
- THX 1138 (1971) – Nagra III
- The Conversation (1974) – Nagra SN
- Diva (1981) – Nagra IV-S, a recording made by the machine is a central to the film's plot.
- Blow Out (1981) – Nagra III and Nagra SN
- Gorillas in the Mist (1988) – Nagra III
- The Russia House (1990) – Nagra III
- Sneakers (1992) – Nagra III
- Voci notturne (ep. 2, 1995) – Nagra 4.2
- Spy Game (2001) – Nagra IV and Nagra SN
- The Life Aquatic with Steve Zissou (2004) – Nagra 4.2
- The Informant! (2009) – Nagra SNST behind opening credits and prominent throughout film
- Captive State (2019) – Nagra IV-D

== In music ==
Paul Simon, Art Garfunkel and others recorded the rhythm track to the Simon and Garfunkel song Cecilia on a Nagra recorder which was unintentionally creating the echo effect on the recording as they banged on a guitar case, piano bench and their legs.

The Nagra IV-S was also used in the recording of the following albums:

- The Beatles "Let It Be" (1970)
- Pink Floyd "The Dark Side of the Moon" (1973)
- David Bowie "Heroes" (1977)
- Led Zeppelin "In Through the Out Door" (1979)
- Michael Jackson "Thriller" (1982)
- AC/DC "Blow Up Your Video" (1988)
