= André Kudelski =

Swiss engineer (born 1960)

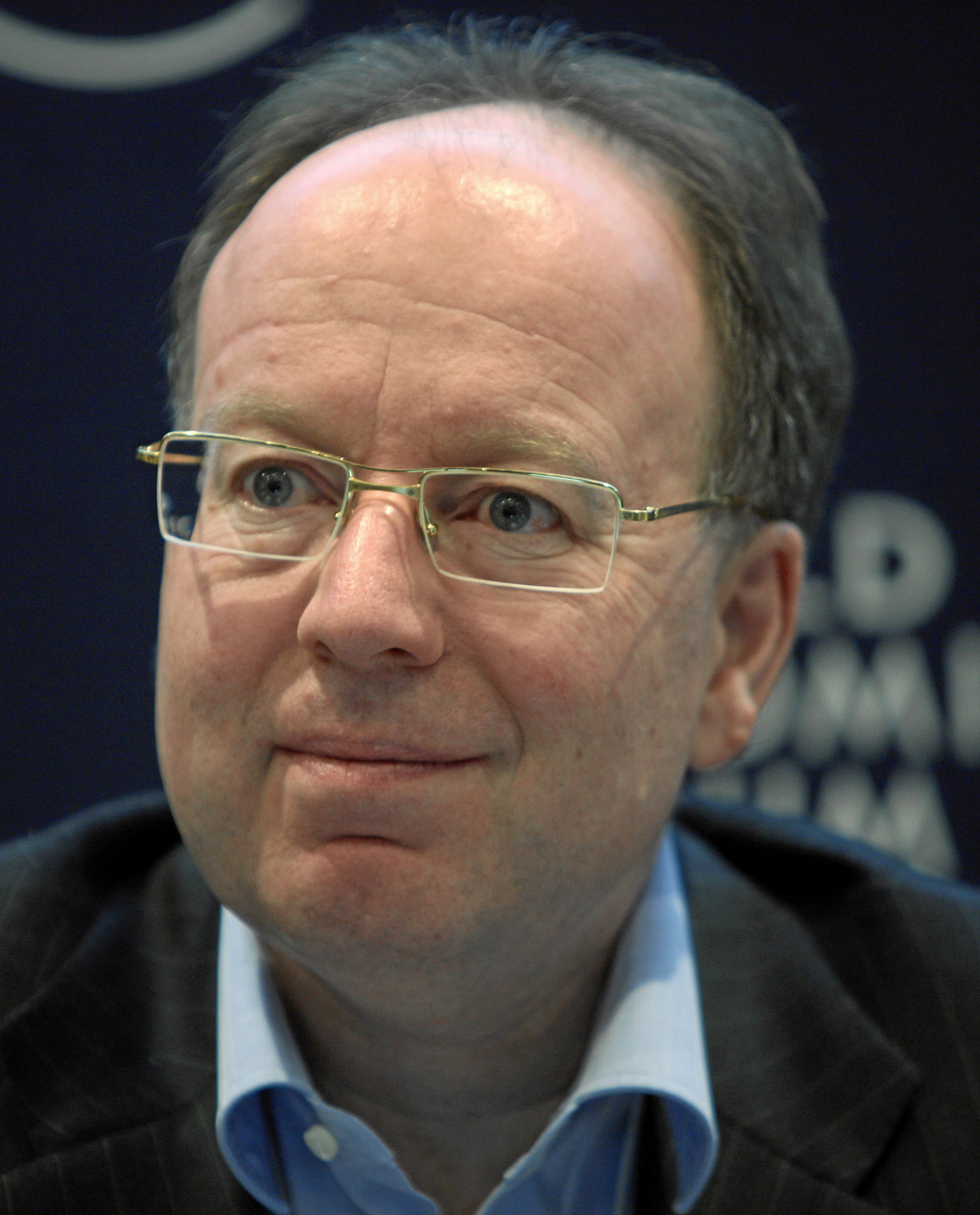
André Kudelski at the World Economic Forum Annual Meeting 2010

André Kudelski (born 26 May 1960 in Lausanne) is a Swiss engineer of Polish descent, who is the Chairman of the Board and Chief Executive Officer of the Kudelski Group.

André Kudelski obtained a degree in physical engineering from the École Polytechnique Fédérale de Lausanne (Switzerland) in 1984. He then held the position of R&D Engineer at Kudelski SA and in Silicon Valley, before becoming Pay TV Product Manager and then Director of Nagravision, Kudelski SA's pay TV division. In 1991, André Kudelski succeeded his father Stefan Kudelski to the post of President and Chief Executive Officer of Kudelski SA. He has been a member of Kudelski SA's Board of Directors since 1987. He is also Chairman of the Board's Strategy Committee.

André Kudelski sat on the Board of the Edipresse Group, of Nestlé, of Swiss International Air Lines and of Dassault Systèmes (France), among others. In addition, he is a member of the Advisory Board of Credit Suisse Group and of the management committee of economiesuisse. He is a member of the Steering Committee of the Bilderberg Group.

In 1995, the World Economic Forum nominated André Kudelski as a "Global Leader for Tomorrow". He received an Emmy award in New York City from the National Academy of Arts and Sciences for his company's achievements in the area of Pay-TV conditional access and scrambling systems in 1996.

In 2002, André Kudelski was on the Forbes List of the World's Richest People, being a billionaire at the time.
