= Cugy, Vaud =

Cugy
- Municipality
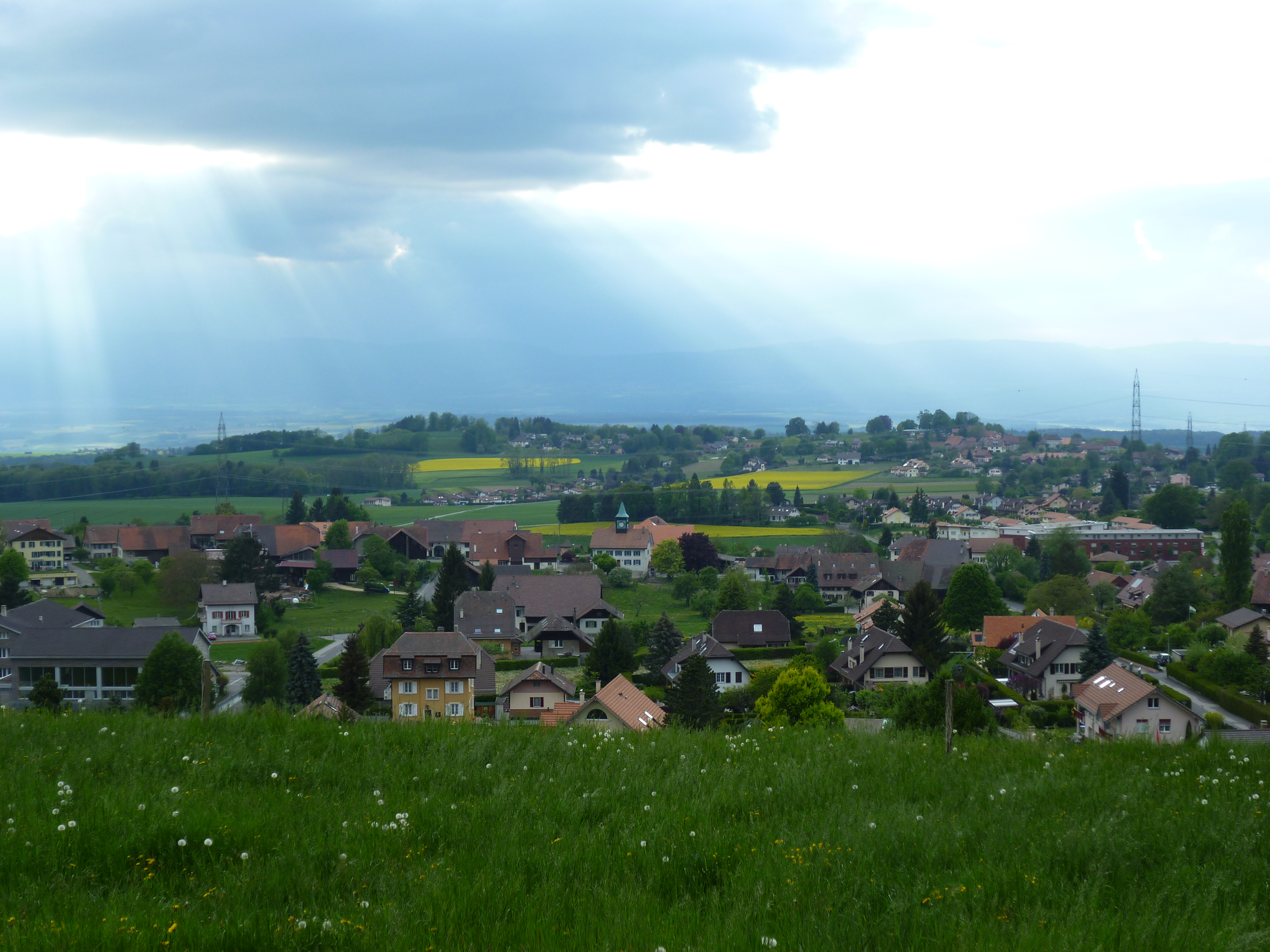
- Cugy village

- Flag Coat of arms
- Location of Cugy
- Location within Switzerland Location within Canton of Vaud
- Coordinates: 46°35′N 6°38′E
- Country: Switzerland
- Canton: Vaud
- District: Gros-de-Vaud

Government
  - Mayor: Syndic

Area
  - Total: 2.9 km^{2} (1.1 sq mi)
- Elevation: 710 m (2,330 ft)

Population (December 2004)
  - Total: 2,115
  - Density: 730/km^{2} (1,900/sq mi)
- Time zone: UTC+01:00 (CET)
  - Summer (DST): UTC+02:00 (CEST)
- Postal code: 1053
- SFOS number: 5516
- ISO 3166 code: CH-VD
- Surrounded by: Bretigny-sur-Morrens, Le Mont-sur-Lausanne, Lausanne, Morrens
- Website: www.cugy-vd.ch

Cugy is a municipality in the district of Gros-de-Vaud in the canton of Vaud in Switzerland.

== History ==
Cugy is first mentioned around 968-985 as in villa Cuzziaco. In 1147 it was mentioned as Cusi.

== Geography ==
Cugy has an area, as of 2009, of 2.9 square kilometers (1.1 sq mi). Of this area, 1.06 km^{2} (0.41 sq mi) or 36.6% is used for agricultural purposes, while 1.07 km^{2} (0.41 sq mi) or 36.9% is forested. Of the rest of the land, 0.77 km^{2} (0.30 sq mi) or 26.6% is settled (buildings or roads).

Of the built up area, industrial buildings made up 1.7% of the total area while housing and buildings made up 20.3% and transportation infrastructure made up 2.8%. Out of the forested land, all of the forested land area is covered with heavy forests. Of the agricultural land, 25.5% is used for growing crops and 10.7% is pastures.

The municipality was part of the Echallens District until it was dissolved on 31 August 2006, and Cugy became part of the new district of Gros-de-Vaud.

The municipality is located on the edge of the woods that cover the Jorat mountain range.

== Coat of arms ==
The blazon of the municipal coat of arms is Gules, two Bars wavy Argent, in chief Argent an Eagle displayed Gules.

== Demographics ==
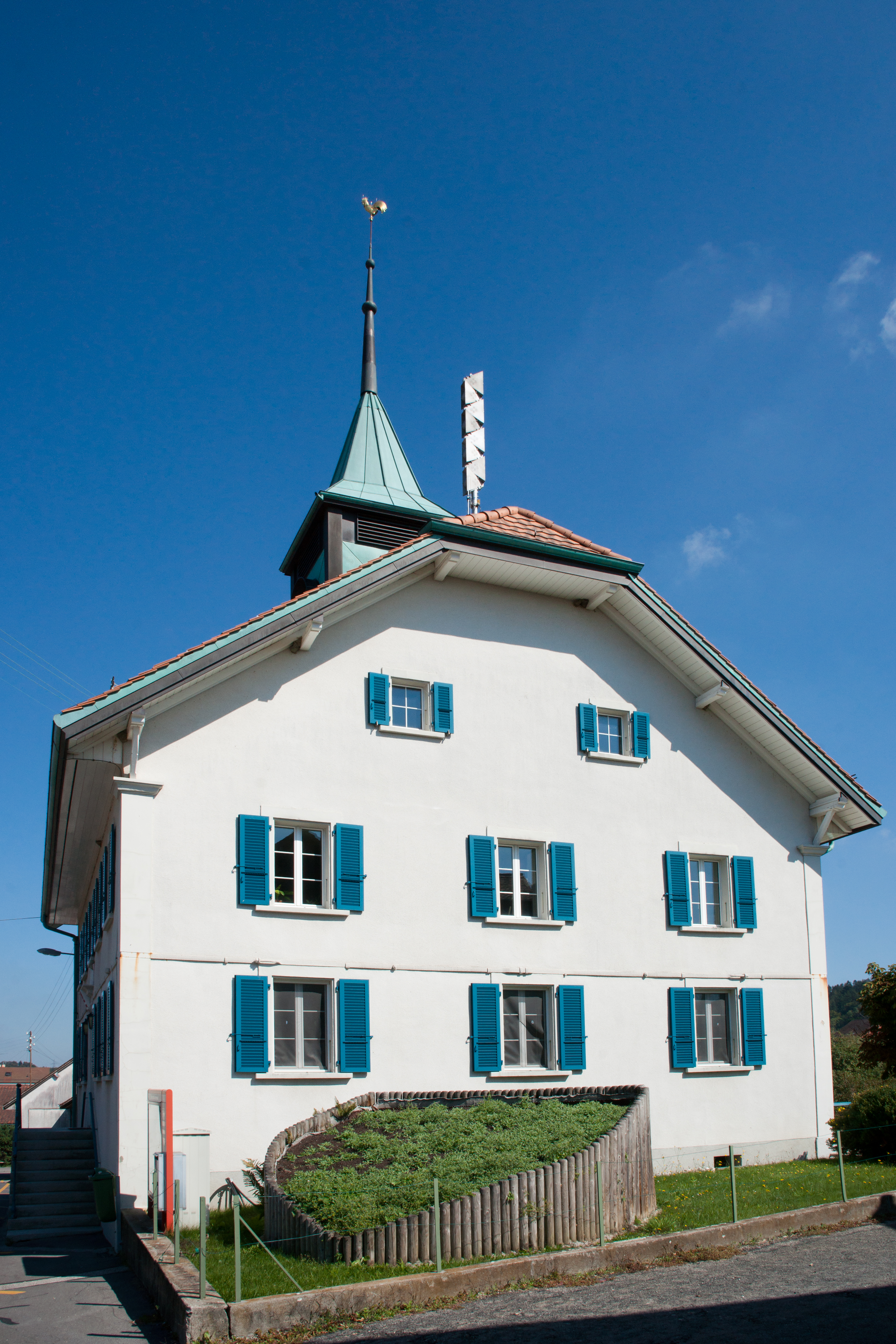
Cugy town hall

Cugy has a population (as of December 2020) of 2,762. As of 2008, 18.2% of the population are resident foreign nationals. Over the last 10 years (1999–2009 ) the population has changed at a rate of 17%. It has changed at a rate of 10.1% due to migration and at a rate of 7% due to births and deaths.

Most of the population (as of 2000) speaks French (1,768 or 88.8%), with German being second most common (101 or 5.1%) and Portuguese being third (28 or 1.4%). There are 27 people who speak Italian and 1 person who speaks Romansh.

Of the population in the municipality 286 or about 14.4% were born in Cugy and lived there in 2000. There were 903 or 45.3% who were born in the same canton, while 379 or 19.0% were born somewhere else in Switzerland, and 382 or 19.2% were born outside of Switzerland.

In 2008 there were 17 live births to Swiss citizens and 10 births to non-Swiss citizens, and in same time span there were 15 deaths of Swiss citizens and 1 non-Swiss citizen death. Ignoring immigration and emigration, the population of Swiss citizens increased by 2 while the foreign population increased by 9. There were 2 Swiss men and 3 Swiss women who immigrated back to Switzerland. At the same time, there were 16 non-Swiss men and 14 non-Swiss women who immigrated from another country to Switzerland. The total Swiss population change in 2008 (from all sources, including moves across municipal borders) was an increase of 12 and the non-Swiss population increased by 51 people. This represents a population growth rate of 2.9%.

The age distribution, as of 2009, in Cugy is; 258 children or 11.5% of the population are between 0 and 9 years old and 303 teenagers or 13.5% are between 10 and 19. Of the adult population, 262 people or 11.7% of the population are between 20 and 29 years old. 295 people or 13.2% are between 30 and 39, 382 people or 17.1% are between 40 and 49, and 258 people or 11.5% are between 50 and 59. The senior population distribution is 265 people or 11.8% of the population are between 60 and 69 years old, 168 people or 7.5% are between 70 and 79, there are 40 people or 1.8% who are between 80 and 89, and there are 9 people or 0.4% who are 90 and older.

As of 2000, there were 820 people who were single and never married in the municipality. There were 970 married individuals, 66 widows or widowers and 136 individuals who are divorced.

As of 2000, there were 794 private households in the municipality, and an average of 2.4 persons per household. There were 195 households that consist of only one person and 45 households with five or more people. Out of a total of 811 households that answered this question, 24.0% were households made up of just one person and there were 5 adults who lived with their parents. Of the rest of the households, there are 266 married couples without children, 265 married couples with children There were 48 single parents with a child or children. There were 15 households that were made up of unrelated people and 17 households that were made up of some sort of institution or another collective housing.

In 2000 there were 293 single family homes (or 68.0% of the total) out of a total of 431 inhabited buildings. There were 90 multi-family buildings (20.9%), along with 29 multi-purpose buildings that were mostly used for housing (6.7%) and 19 other use buildings (commercial or industrial) that also had some housing (4.4%). Of the single family homes 9 were built before 1919, while 38 were built between 1990 and 2000. The greatest number of single family homes (105) were built between 1971 and 1980. The most multi-family homes (26) were built between 1981 and 1990 and the next most (23) were built between 1971 and 1980. There were 7 multi-family houses built between 1996 and 2000.

In 2000 there were 803 apartments in the municipality. The most common apartment size was 4 rooms of which there were 199. There were 16 single room apartments and 323 apartments with five or more rooms. Of these apartments, a total of 762 apartments (94.9% of the total) were permanently occupied, while 30 apartments (3.7%) were seasonally occupied and 11 apartments (1.4%) were empty. As of 2009, the construction rate of new housing units was 2.7 new units per 1000 residents. The vacancy rate for the municipality, in 2010, was 0.45%.

The historical population is given in the following chart:

== Politics ==
In the 2007 federal election the most popular party was the SVP which received 23.49% of the vote. The next three most popular parties were the SP (21.78%), the FDP (16.41%) and the Green Party (13.98%). In the federal election, a total of 698 votes were cast, and the voter turnout was 50.8%.

== Economy ==
As of 2010, Cugy had an unemployment rate of 3.4%. As of 2008, there were 10 people employed in the primary economic sector and about 6 businesses involved in this sector. 222 people were employed in the secondary sector and there were 36 businesses in this sector. 502 people were employed in the tertiary sector, with 75 businesses in this sector. There were 1,069 residents of the municipality who were employed in some capacity, of which females made up 43.9% of the workforce.

In 2008 the total number of full-time equivalent jobs was 557. The number of jobs in the primary sector was 7, all of which were in agriculture. The number of jobs in the secondary sector was 210 of which 84 or (40.0%) were in manufacturing and 125 (59.5%) were in construction. The number of jobs in the tertiary sector was 340. In the tertiary sector; 100 or 29.4% were in wholesale or retail sales or the repair of motor vehicles, 3 or 0.9% were in the movement and storage of goods, 5 or 1.5% were in a hotel or restaurant, 12 or 3.5% were in the information industry, 23 or 6.8% were the insurance or financial industry, 27 or 7.9% were technical professionals or scientists, 24 or 7.1% were in education and 77 or 22.6% were in health care.

In 2000, there were 417 workers who commuted into the municipality and 879 workers who commuted away. The municipality is a net exporter of workers, with about 2.1 workers leaving the municipality for every one entering. About 2.6% of the workforce coming into Cugy are coming from outside Switzerland. Of the working population, 15.7% used public transportation to get to work, and 69.8% used a private car.

== Religion ==
From the 2000 census, 696 or 34.9% were Roman Catholic, while 875 or 43.9% belonged to the Swiss Reformed Church. Of the rest of the population, there were 6 members of an Orthodox church (or about 0.30% of the population), there were 3 individuals (or about 0.15% of the population) who belonged to the Christian Catholic Church, and there were 69 individuals (or about 3.46% of the population) who belonged to another Christian church. There was 1 individual who was Jewish, and 32 (or about 1.61% of the population) who were Islamic. There were 7 individuals who were Buddhist and 2 individuals who belonged to another church. 259 (or about 13.00% of the population) belonged to no church, are agnostic or atheist, and 74 individuals (or about 3.71% of the population) did not answer the question.

== Education ==
In Cugy about 779 or (39.1%) of the population have completed non-mandatory upper secondary education, and 370 or (18.6%) have completed additional higher education (either university or a Fachhochschule). Of the 370 who completed tertiary schooling, 55.9% were Swiss men, 29.7% were Swiss women, 8.9% were non-Swiss men and 5.4% were non-Swiss women.

In the 2009/2010 school year there were a total of 291 students in the Cugy school district. In the Vaud cantonal school system, two years of non-obligatory pre-school are provided by the political districts. During the school year, the political district provided pre-school care for a total of 296 children of which 96 children (32.4%) received subsidized pre-school care. The canton's primary school program requires students to attend for four years. There were 142 students in the municipal primary school program. The obligatory lower secondary school program lasts for six years and there were 143 students in those schools. There were also 6 students who were home schooled or attended another non-traditional school.

As of 2000, there were 42 students in Cugy who came from another municipality, while 197 residents attended schools outside the municipality.
