= Stefan Kudelski =

Polish audio engineer (1931–2013)

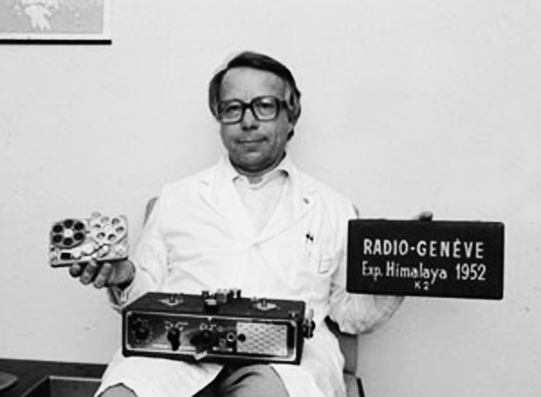
- (Photo by Erling Mandelmann)
- Born: 27 August 1931; Warsaw, Poland
- Died: 26 January 2013 (aged 81); Cheseaux-sur-Lausanne, Switzerland
- Occupation: Founder of the Kudelski Group (1951–1991)
- Known for: Creating the Nagra audio recorders

Stefan Kudelski (27 August 1931 – 26 January 2013) was a Polish audio engineer known for creating the Nagra series of professional audio recorders.

== Life and career ==
Stefan Kudelski was born in Warsaw into a family with an engineering background. In September 1939 the family fled Poland during the Nazi German and Soviet Invasion of Poland. They escaped to Romania, then moved to Hungary, and on to France. When the Germans occupied southern Vichy France, the family escaped to Switzerland in 1943. He studied at the Swiss Federal Institute of Technology in Lausanne and constructed his first tape recorder there, as a student project. The recorder was supposed to drive a machine tool, but was good enough to record audio as well.

- 1951 – Kudelski built his first Nagra tape recorder
- 1957 – The Nagra III, a transistorized tape recorder with electronic speed control, is launched

Kudelski received many awards during his career:

- Academy Awards: Scientific or Technical Award (1965, 1977 and 1978)
- Gordon E. Sawyer Award (1990)
- Emmy Awards (1984 and 1986)
- Gold Medals from L. Warner, AES (1984), Lyra and Eurotechnica.

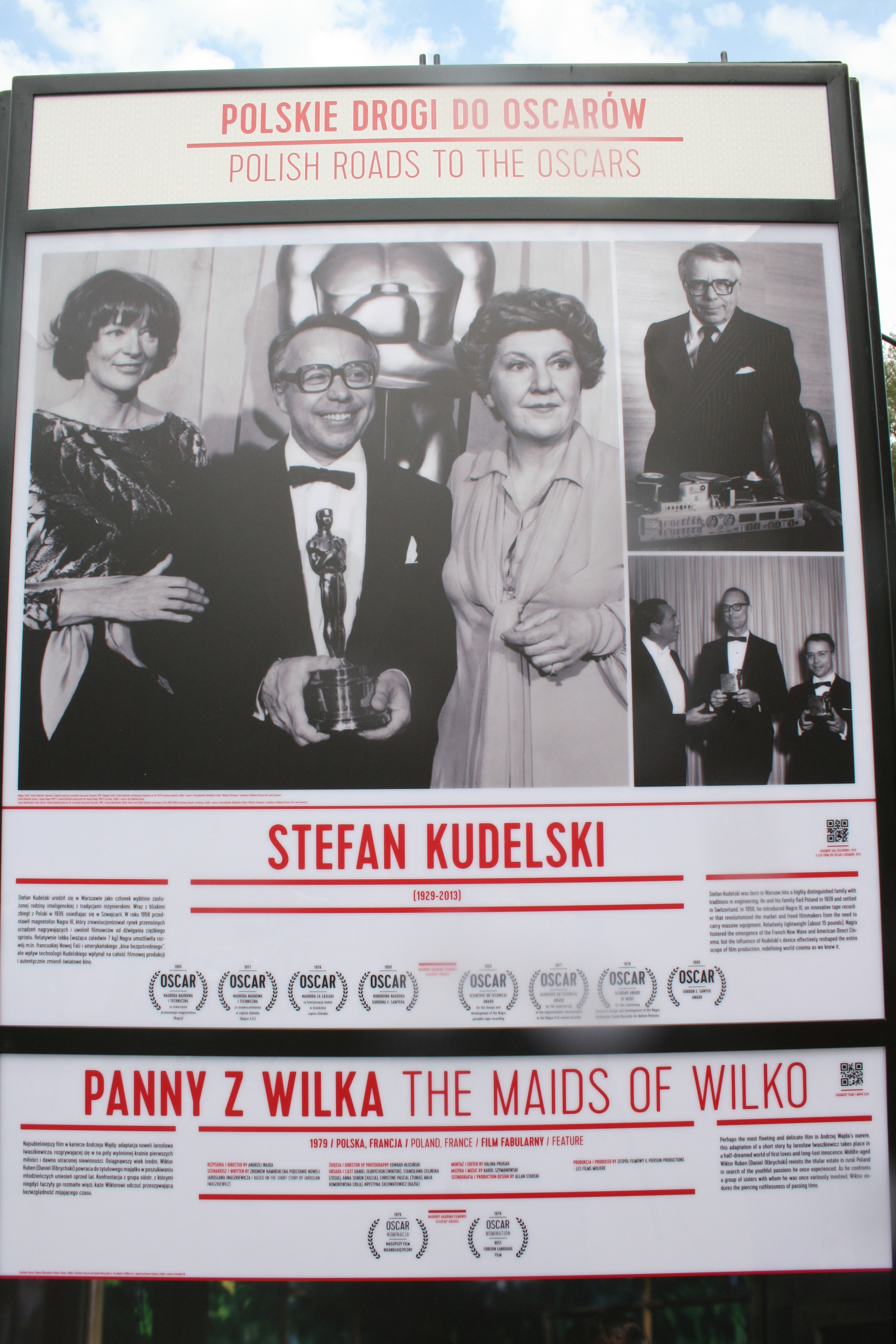
Photo of Kudelski receiving one of his very many Oscars

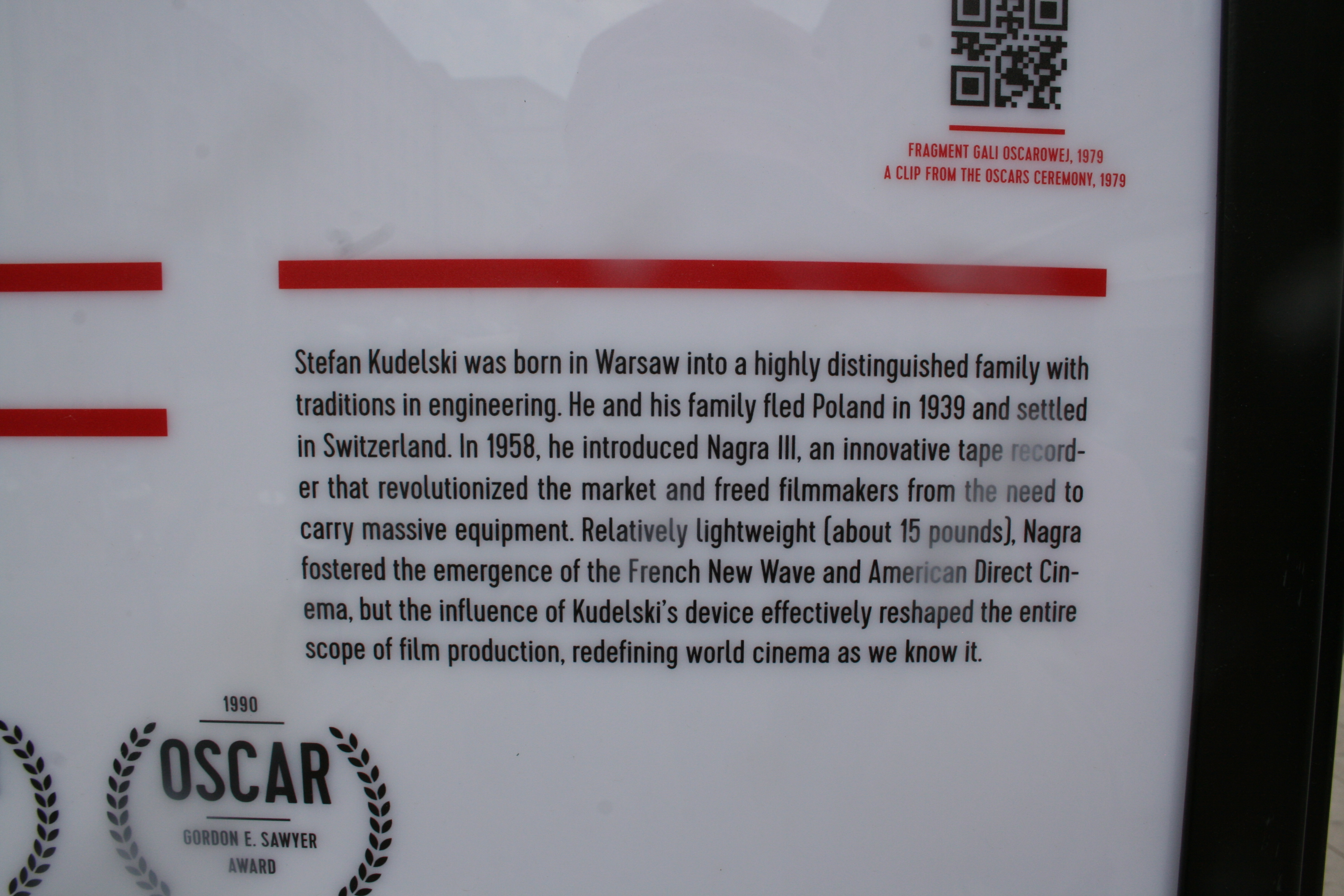
The detailed description on monument.

Stefan Kudelski retired in 1991, and was succeeded by his son, André, as a Chairman and CEO of the Kudelski Group.

He died on 26 January 2013 in Lausanne, Switzerland.
