= Bel-Air LEB railway station =

Railway station in Lausanne, Switzerland

Bel-Air LEB
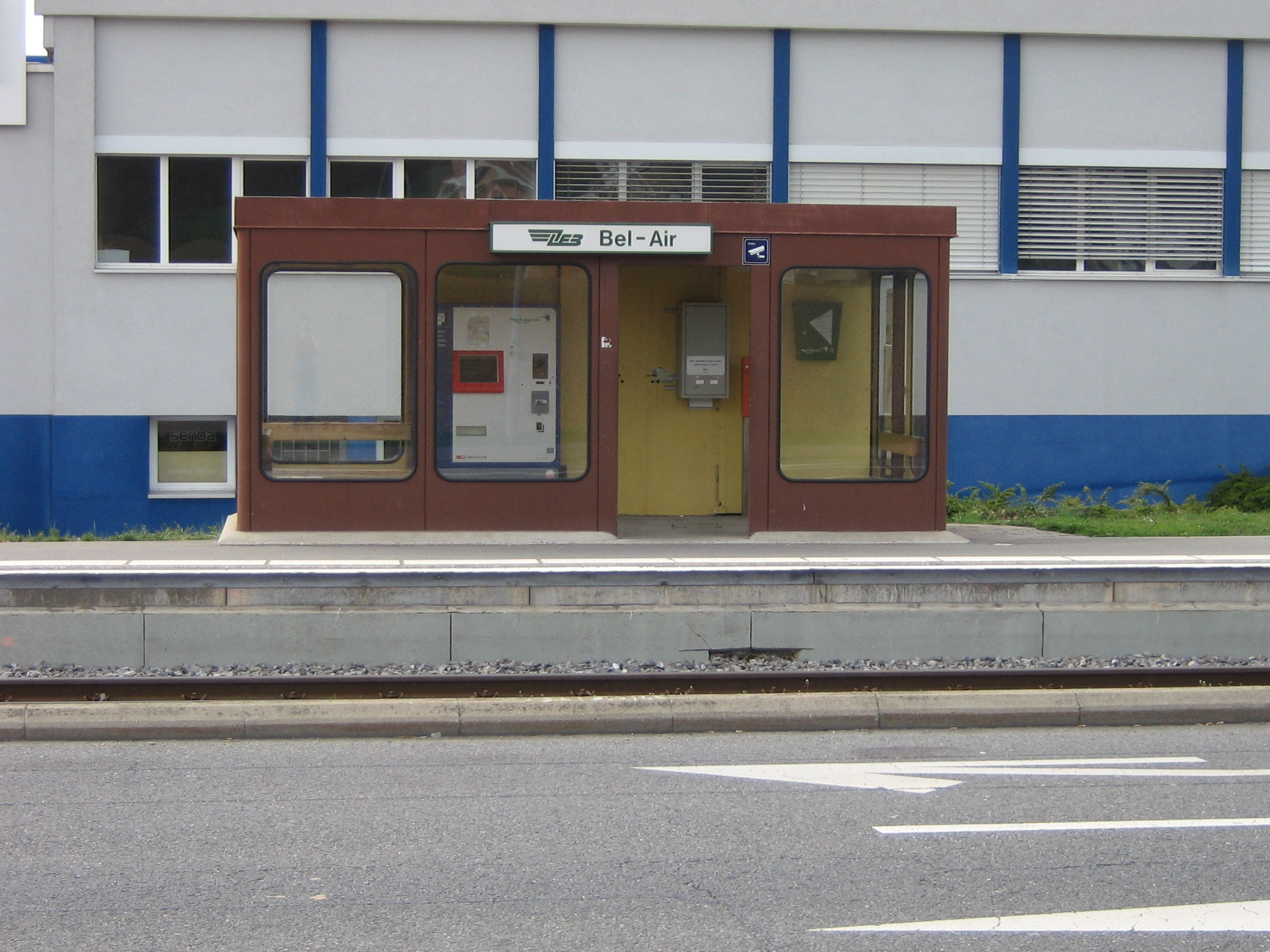
- The station platform in 2011

General information
- Location: Lausanne, Vaud; Switzerland
- Coordinates: 46°34′43″N 6°36′20″E
- Elevation: 605 m (1,985 ft)
- Owner: Chemin de fer Lausanne-Échallens-Bercher
- Line: Lausanne–Bercher line
- Distance: 7.6 km (4.7 mi) from Lausanne-Flon
- Platforms: 1 side platform
- Tracks: 1
- Train operators: Chemin de fer Lausanne-Échallens-Bercher

Construction
- Accessible: Yes

Other information
- Station code: 8501170 (BEAI)
- Fare zone: 16 (mobilis)

Services
| Preceding station | LEB | Following station |
|---|---|---|
| Cheseaux towards Echallens or Bercher | R20 | Vernand-Camarès towards Lausanne-Flon |
Location

Bel-Air LEB railway station (French: Halte de Bel-Air LEB) is a railway station in the Vernand exclave of the municipality of Lausanne, in the Swiss canton of Vaud. It is located on the 1,000 mm (3 ft 3 3/8 in) Lausanne–Bercher line of the Chemin de fer Lausanne-Échallens-Bercher (LEB). The station has a single track and platform.

Bel-Air station opened to service in 1984 following the redevelopment of the intersection between the Chemin de Praz-Lau and the Route de Neuchâtel.

== Services ==
As of the December 2023 timetable change, the following services stop at Bel-Air LEB:

- Regio: service every fifteen minutes between Lausanne-Flon and Echallens, with every other train continuing from Echallens to Bercher.
