= Sri Lankans in Switzerland =

Sri Lankan Swiss
Total population
- 46,000 – 55,000 (2010)

Languages
- English · Swiss German · Swiss French · Swiss Italian · Tamil

Religion
- Hinduism · Christianity · Buddhism · Islam

Related ethnic groups
- Sri Lankan people

Sri Lankans in Switzerland refer to Sri Lankans living in Switzerland. There are about 46,000 to 55,000 Swiss of Sri Lankan origin and Sri Lankan expatriates living in Switzerland. Most of them are ethnic Tamils.

Most of the Tamils in Switzerland are from Sri Lanka, who came to Switzerland during 1980s and 1990s as refugees due to the Sri Lankan Civil War. The Tamils are well integrated in the Swiss society and have proved themselves as a hard-working people and many young Tamils are doing well in school. Tamil values are still strong among the community; social system and arranged wedding are common. The second generation seem to be better integrated than the first generation, but most still follow the old ways.

== History ==
Since the 1970-80s Switzerland has had a relatively large Tamil population among Europe, almost all of them being refugees and labour migrants from Sri Lanka. Many had already been in the country for more than fifteen years due to the Sri Lankan Civil War.

=== LTTE in Switzerland ===
As well a providing refuge for some Sri Lankans, members of the Liberation Tigers of Tamil Eelam (LTTE or Tamil Tigers) have been based in Switzerland. The LTTE in Switzerland have been known as the Swiss Tigers. The Sri Lankan Tamil community in Switzerland has become LTTE sympathisers who have created a network of money power, man power and muscle power towards the Tamil eelam independence movement back in Sri Lanka. Because of this Switzerland has been regarded as the “புலிகள் கோட்டை” (tiger fort) in Europe. Its contribution to the LTTE to the war effort has proportionately exceeded that of Tamils living in other Western countries.

=== End of the war ===
With the end of the Sri Lankan Civil War, LTTE networks around the world were being shut down by both Sri Lankan and foreign governments. In 2011 the Swiss police arrested ten former LTTE representatives in the country for threatening, blackmailing and extortion of Tamils of the Sri Lankan diaspora to support the LTTE and the war effort financially. The funds were mainly used to buy weapons in Sri Lanka. Those arrested included the head of the LTTE in Switzerland Vijaratnam Sivanesan alias 'Ragu alias Ragupathy', his predecessor Chelliah Kularajasekeram alias 'Kulam' and the Swiss Tiger finance chief Chelliah Jeyapalan alias 'Abdullah'. They are facing charges of money laundering and belonging to a criminal organisation.

== Demographics ==
As of 2010, Switzerland is home to around 47,000 Sri Lanka Tamils. About 10% of them have been naturalised. This figure does not include most of the second-generation Tamils born to parents with Swiss citizenship. The Tamils in Switzerland live mainly in the German-speaking areas, such as cantons Bern, Zürich and Basel.

== Organizations ==
- Global Sri Lankan Forum
- Sri Lankan Diaspora Switzerland (SLDS) This website has been taken offline in 2012.

== Community ==
The Sri Sivasubramaniar Temple is a Hindu temple located in Adliswil in the Sihl Valley in the canton of Zürich and was established in 1994 as a non-profit foundation, as well as the Sri Vishnu Thurkkai Amman Temple, located in the municipality of Dürnten in the canton of Zürich in 2010. The Tamil community established some more temples in Switzerland, among them the temple of the Saivanerikoodam association in the Haus der Religionen in Bern in December 2014. Thus being a minority of the Tamil people living in Switzerland, Zentrum für Migrationskirchen (literally: Centre for migration churches) in Zürich-Wipkingen houses among others the Oikos church that has its origins in Sri Lanka and was founded in 2004.

== Religion ==
The majority of Hindus in Switzerland are Tamils. Between 1990s and 2000s, around twenty Hindu temples were founded by Tamils. The Sri Sivasubramaniar Temple in Zürich is the most famous and largest Hindu temple in Switzerland. Most of Tamil Christians in Switzerland are integrated in Swiss parishes. The majority of Tamil Christians live in the canton of Zürich.

== Politics ==
Switzerland was one of the few Sri Lankan Tamil diaspora countries, where the Tamil Tigers could act legally. During the last phase of Sri Lankan civil war, more than 10 000 Tamils protested in front of the United Nations Office in Switzerland.

== See also ==
- Sri Lanka – Switzerland relations
- Hinduism in Switzerland
