= Ralph Hammerthaler =

German writer (born 1965)

Ralph Hammerthaler (born 2 December 1965) is a German writer.

== Life ==
Born in Wasserburg am Inn, Hammerthaler studied in Munich, Berlin and Jena and wrote a dissertation on political public sphere in sociology. After eight years as a writer in the feature section of the Süddeutsche Zeitung, including two years as culture editor in Berlin, he began writing novels, stories and essays as well as plays and opera libretti. His libretto Die Bestmannoper about the Nazi war criminal Alois Brunner was set to music by Alex Nowitz and premiered in 2006 in the presence of Serge and Beate Klarsfeld. His plays have been translated into several languages. He was a guest dramaturge at the Schaubühne am Lehniner Platz and he is Socio Honorario of the Teatro Sombrero Azul in Mexico City. He was city writer in Dresden, Rheinsberg, Prishtina and Split as well as street writers in Oberhausen. His literary work has won many awards. The Süddeutsche Zeitung praised his novel "Unter Komplizen" (Among Accomplices) as a "contemporary artist's novel with an auspicious drive".

== Work ==
=== Novels ===
- Kosovos Töchter, novel. Berlin: Quintus Verlag 2020. ISBN 9783947215867
- Unter Komplizen, novel. Berlin: Verbrecher Verlag 2018. ISBN 9783957323057
- Kurzer Roman über ein Verbrechen, novel. Berlin: Verbrecher Verlag 2016. ISBN 9783957321947
- Der Sturz des Friedrich Voss, novel. Cologne: DuMont Buchverlag 2010 ISBN 978-3-8321-9540-3
- Aber das ist ein anderes Kapitel, novel. Wasserburg: Poss Verlag 2007 ISBN 978-3-9810422-3-8
- Alles bestens, novel. Reinbek: Rowohlt Verlag 2002 ISBN 978-3498029661

=== Plays ===
- Zweikampf, in Theater der Zeit, February 2018, pp. 54–64.
- Alleinunterhalter, premiered on 21 June 2015 in Halle, Neues Theater (Albanian premiere 2018 in Prishtina).
- one god one woman one dollar, premiered 25 February 2013 in Munich, proT.
- Schnappräuber, premiered 6 November 2005 in Munich, ZKMax (Spanish premiere 2008 in Mexico City; Russian premiere 2010 in Omsk).
- Here is not America, first performed on 2 December 2004 in Düsseldorf, Forum Freies Theater Kammerspiele.

=== Opera libretti ===
- Die Nacht des Brokers (music Christoph Reiserer), premiered on 22 February 2010 in Munich, Muffathalle.
- Der Schlaftöter, monodrama (music Alex Nowitz), premiered on 8 February 2008 in Potsdam, Schiffbauergasse fabrik.
- Moshammeroper (music Bruno Nelissen), premiered on 23 August 2007 in Berlin, Neuköllner Oper.
- Die Bestmannoper (music Alex Nowitz), premiered on 8 April 2006 in Osnabrück, Theater Osnabrück.

=== Narratives, Essays, Biographies ===
- Jenseits von Gaza, Die mittlere Schwester, Der Grüne Ibrahim, in: Larissa Boehning/Jörg Feßmann/Marion Neumann (ed.): Baba, wie lange fahren wir noch? Erzählungen. Berlin: Akademie der Künste 2019, pp. 21–51, pp. 156–169, pp. 223–236. ISBN 978-3-88331-233-0
- Marktstraße. Oberhausen: Literaturhaus Oberhausen 2018.
- Alexeij Sagerer. liebe mich – wiederhole mich, Künstlerische Biografie. Berlin: Verlag Theater der Zeit 2016. ISBN 978-3-95749-086-5
- Der Bolschewist. Michael Tschesno-Hell und seine DEFA-Filme. Berlin: Bertz + Fischer Verlag 2016. ISBN 978-3865054098
- Unsere Kumpeline, in Thilo Bock/Peter Wawerzinek: Das auffallend unauffällige Leben der Haushälterin Hannelore Keyn in der Villa Grassimo zu Wewelsfleth. Geistergeschichten. Berlin: Verbrecher Verlag 2016, pp. 132–133. ISBN 9783957321954
- 16 – Worauf es ankommt, wenn du jung bist. Rheinsberger Bogen 36. Rheinsberg: Kurt-Tucholsky-Literaturmuseum 2012.
- Gespenster. Eine Nacht im Schauspielhaus, in Wilfried Schulz/Harald Müller/Felicitas Zürcher (ed.): Schauspielhaus Dresden. 100 Jahre Schauspielhaus. Berlin: Verlag Theater der Zeit 2012, pp. 315–319. ISBN 978-3-943881-01-1
- Der komische Dichter. 197 Jahre tot, in Ulrich Katzer/Wolfgang de Bruyn/Markus Wieners (ed.): Kleist oder Die Ordnung der Welt. Berlin: Verlag Theater der Zeit 2008, pp. 136–145. ISBN 9783940737137
- Sieben Briefe, in Dieter Stolz (ed.): Damals hinterm Deich. Geschichten aus dem Alfred-Döblin-Haus. Göttingen: Steidl Verlag 2002, pp. 199–209. ISBN 978-3-88243-848-2
- Die Weimarer Lähmung. Kulturstadt Europas 1999 – Szenisches Handeln in der Politik. Berlin: Lukas Verlag 1998. ISBN 978-3-931836-19-1
- Theater in der DDR. Chronik und Positionen. (Christa Hasche, Traute Schölling und Joachim Fiebach als Autoren der Chronik.) Berlin: Henschel Verlag 1994. ISBN 978-3894872007

=== Publisher ===
- Elisabeth Schweeger: Täuschung ist kein Spiel mehr. Nachdenken über Theater. Berlin: Verlag Theater der Zeit 2008. ISBN 978-3940737229
- Räumungen. Von der Unverschämtheit, Theater für ein Medium der Zukunft zu halten. Berlin: Alexander Verlag 2000. ISBN 978-3-89581-048-0
