= Arulmihu Sivan Temple =

Hindu temple in Switzerland

Arulmigu Sivan Temple
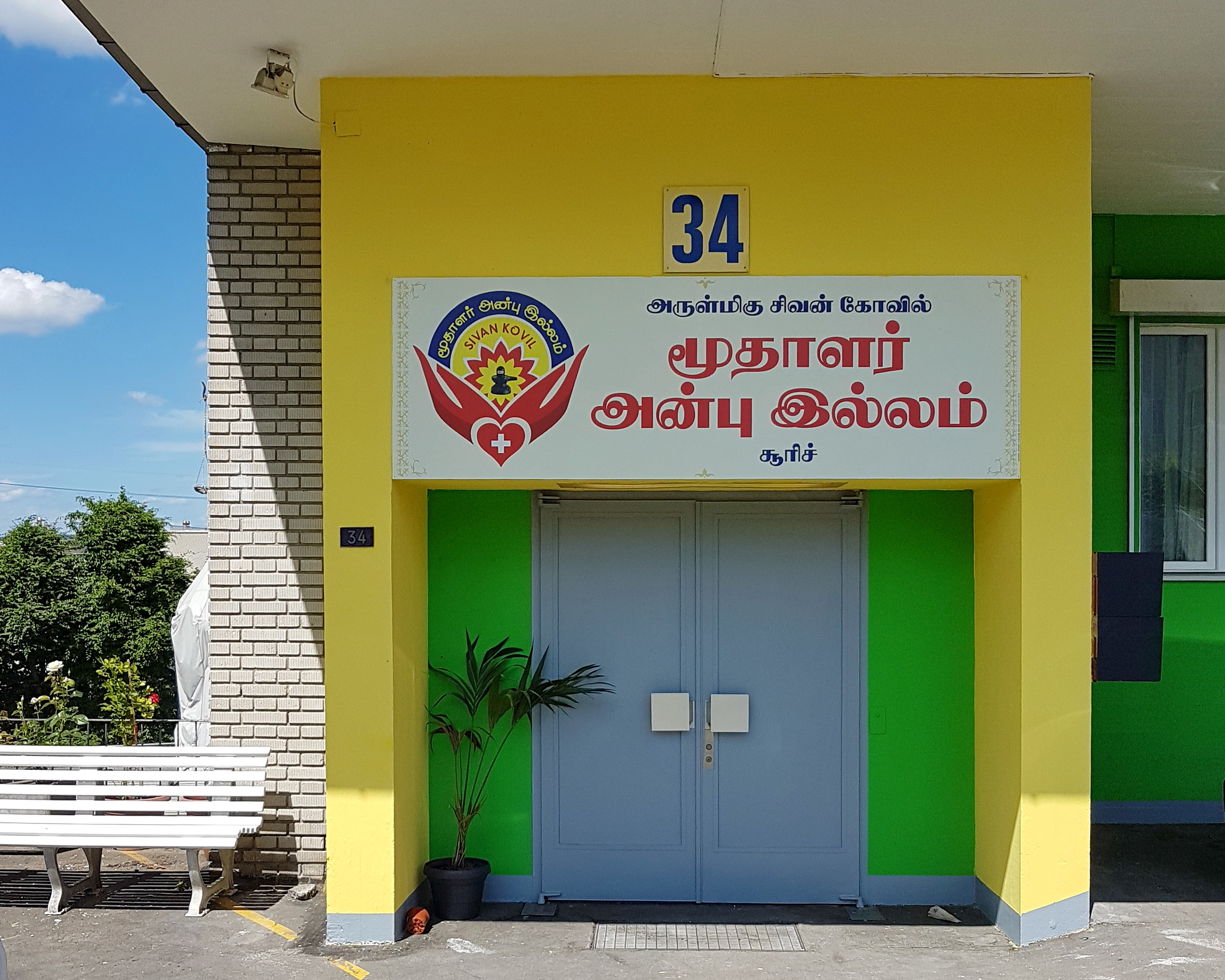
- Entrance of the renewed temple building

- Location within Switzerland

Religion
- Affiliation: Hinduism
- District: Bülach District
- Deity: Shiva
- Governing body: Saiva Tamil Sangam

Location
- Location: Glattbrugg, Opfikon
- State: Canton of Zürich
- Country: Switzerland
- Coordinates: 47°25′52″N 8°33′23″E

Architecture
- Type: Hindu temple
- Established: 1994
- Temple: 1

The Arulmiku Sivan Temple is a Hindu temple located in the municipality of Glattbrugg in the Canton of Zürich in Switzerland.

== History ==
In the 1990s, an interreligious society was established in the canton of Zürich to support the foundation of a centre for spiritual and cultural care of Tamil people in Switzerland, as well as to preserve and maintain the Tamil culture of the approximatively 35,000 (around 20,000 in the canton of Zürich) Tamil people of Sri Lankan origin living in Switzerland. So, the Sri Sivasubramaniar Temple in Adliswil and the Arulmiku Sivan Temple in Glattbrugg were founded in 1994 as a non-profit foundation.

== Location ==
The temple was established in a pre-existing warehouse at the industry quarter between Glattbrugg and Seebach (Zürich). The Temple is located at Industriestrasse 34, 8152 Glattbrugg.

== Cultural and religious life ==
Poojas are celebrated twice per day, and the temple festivals attract up to 4,000 devotees and visitors.

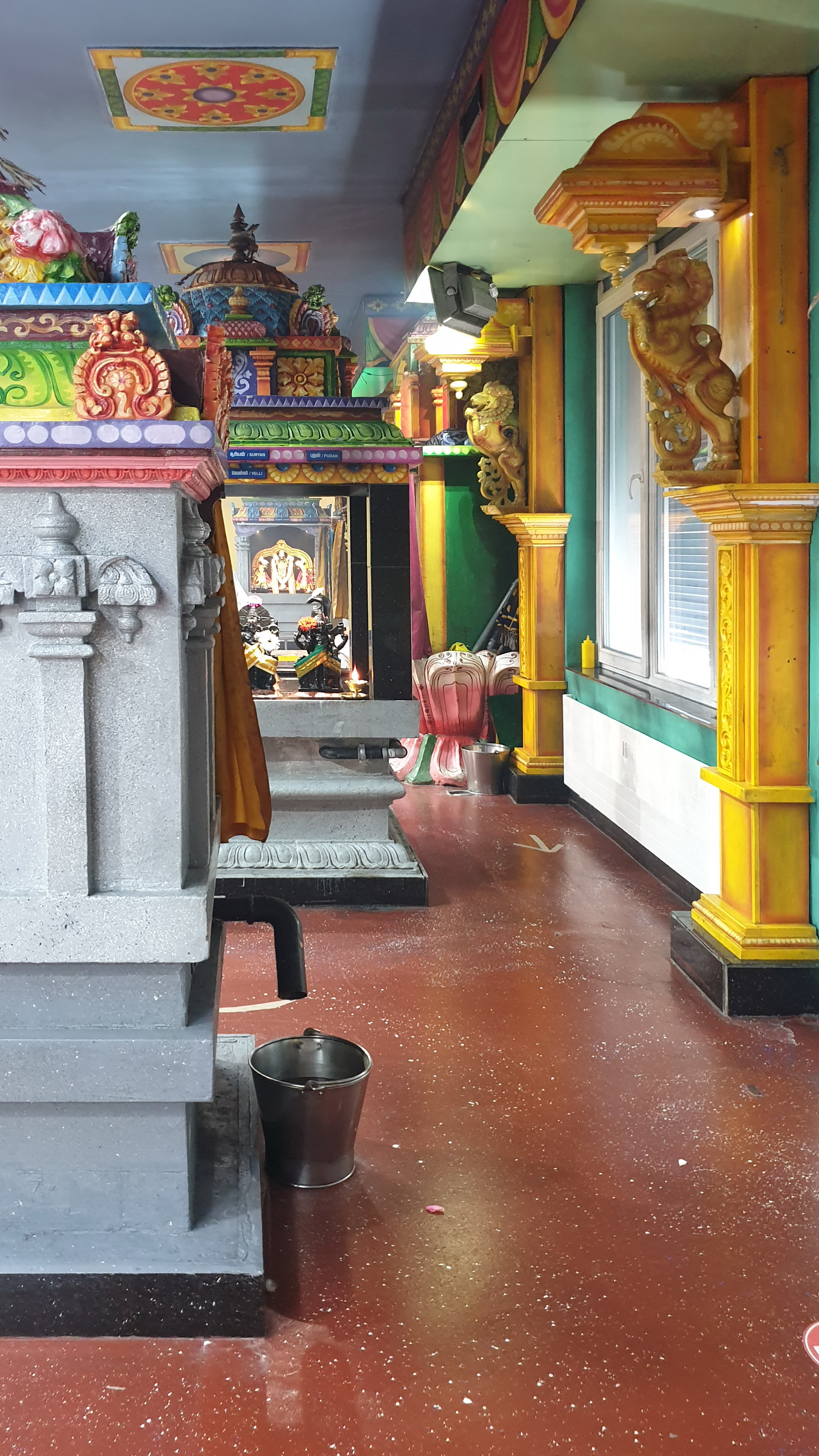
Temple interior

The Neumarkt Theatre developed a play which was performed in March 2018 in the midst of the altars and columns of the Glattbrugg Shiva Temple. Members from different religious communities – Muslims, Hindus, Jews, Orthodox, Free Churchers and also atheists – formed the Chor der gläubigen Bürger (englisch: Choir of Believing Citizens).

== See also ==
- Hinduism in Switzerland
- List of Hindu temples in Switzerland
