= Szentbékkálla =

- Location of Szentbékkálla
- Coordinates: 46.88738°N 17.56363°E
- Country: Hungary
- County: Veszprém

Area
  - Total: 10.7 km^{2} (4.1 sq mi)

Population (2004)
  - Total: 237
  - Density: 22.14/km^{2} (57.3/sq mi)
- Time zone: UTC+1 (CET)
  - Summer (DST): UTC+2 (CEST)
- Postal code: 8281
- Area code: 87

Szentbékkálla is a village in Káli-basin, Balaton-Highlands, Veszprém county, Hungary. In the Middle Ages the village had a monastery of St. Benedict, which explains its name, because earlier it was Szentbenedekkál (Kál of Saint Benedict). Kál was a prince and landlord here in the ages of the Árpád's peoples arrival to Hungary.

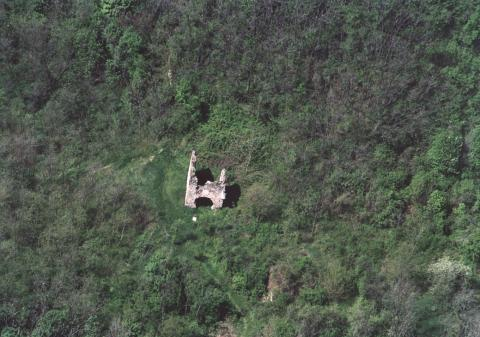
Aerial photography: Szentbékkálla, monastery ruins

== Interesting geology at Szentbékkálla ==
The Szentbékkálla region is interesting from geological aspects. The volcanism at the Bakony–Balaton Highland Volcanic Field produced beautiful scenic mountains which preserved the elevations of the Pliocene plains. The basalts contain various xenoliths. Among the xenoliths there are igneous inclusions genetically related to basalts.

Genetic and textural characteristics of the host basalt and some of its inclusions are analog from Szentbékkálla, North-Balaton Mountains, Hungary, to the range of the Martian meteorites, the shergottites. Several types of periodic rocks (lherzolites, websterites and harzburgites) can be found as inclusions in the basalt of tuff and the olivine-phyric basalts also can be found among the basalts of the Little Hungarian Plain and Tapolca Basin.

== Short origin history of lherzolites of Szentbékkálla ==
It was found 150 years ago, that basalts of the Balaton-Highlands contain "olivine-bombs". Later, about 40 years ago it was shown, that these olivine-bombs are xenoliths originating in the upper mantle. All four main components of the lehrolites were found: the two fpyroxenes, olivine and spinel.

Petrographic research all over the world studied mantle xenoliths and it was found, they are the source rocks for basalts: the basalts are partial melts of the mantle rocks. During the upheaval process the basaltic liquid carries up the fragments of the upper mantle. Several other igneous xenoliths are also related to the upper mantle and basalts. That is the short explanation of the sequence of various upper mantle xenoliths inside the basalts of Szentbékkálla.

== International relations ==
=== Twin towns – Sister cities ===
Szentbékkálla is twinned with:

- Dürnten, Switzerland – since 2001

== Gigapan Photo ==
Interactive Gigapan Photo of Szentbékkálla and the surrounding area. https://gigapan.com/gigapans/36698
