= Hinduism in Switzerland =

Swiss Hindus Schweizer Hindus Hindous suisses Indù svizzeri
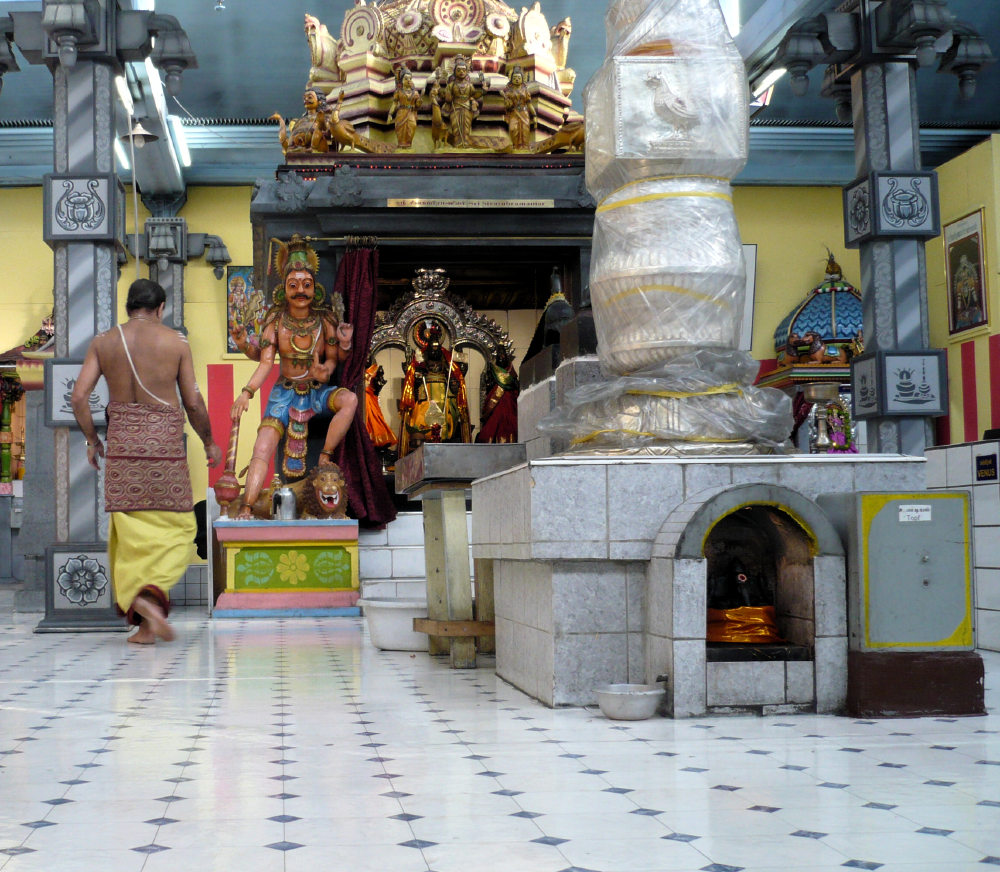
- Interior of Sri Sivasubramaniar Temple in Adliswil

Total population
- 54,300 (2024); 0.6% of its total population

Languages
- Sanskrit, Tamil (sacred); German, French, Italian and Romansh

Hinduism is a minority religion in Switzerland followed by 0.6% of the country's population. It is practised mainly by the Sri Lankan Tamil Hindus and most of them following Shaivism.

Hinduism was present in Switzerland from the early 20th century through Yoga, Hindu philosophy and movements such as ISKCON, the Divine Light Centre in Winterthur etc. In the 1980s, Sri Lankan Tamil refugees came and they established Hindu temples and associations across the country.

== History ==
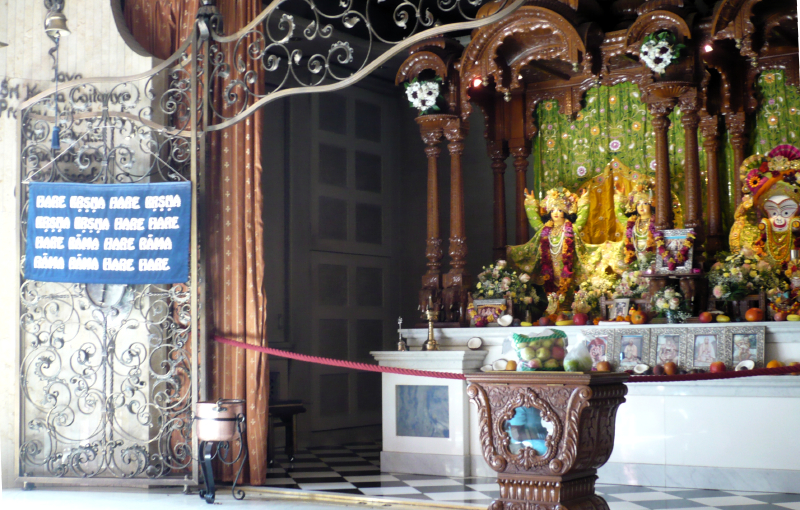
ISKCON temple in Zurich

Interest in Hindu philosophy and physical yoga emerged in the early 20th century as part of a cultural and life reform movement. Intellectual engagement was promoted through the lectures and writings of Swami Vivekananda. Swami Vivekanand visited and toured Switzerland in 1896. Following World War II, posture-based yoga was formalised when Selvarajan Yesudian and Elisabeth Haich relocated their yoga school from Hungary to Zurich in 1948. In the 1950s, further yoga centers across Geneva, Lausanne, Basel, Bern, and Lucerne.

From the 1950s onwards, international guru movements established permanent monastic and educational centers. In 1952, the Self-Realisation Fellowship, founded by Paramhansa Yoganand established a center in Zurich in 1952. In 1966, Swami Omkarananda founded the Divine Light Centre in Winterthur. In 1969, Centre Vedantique was established in Geneva to study Advaita Vedanta as interpreted by Swami Vivekananda. In 1973 until 1990, the international headquarters for Transcendental Meditation was established at Seelisberg. In 1972, International Society for Krishan Consciousness, ISKCON, established its first Swiss center near Geneva. ISKCON founder Swami Prabhupada visited the country multiple times in the 1970s. An ISKCON temple was built in Zurich in 1975.

Following the Sri Lankan civil war and 1983 anti-Tamil pogroms, thousands of Sri Lankan Tamils settled in Switzerland. Approximately 87% of the Tamil refugees between 1983 and 1991 were Hindus. Until they established their own temples, the Sri Lankan Tamils would attend ISKCON congregations. The first dedicated Tamil Hindu temple opened in 1986 in Basel. By the early 2000s, over 20 Tamil Hindu temples were established.

Since 2007, the Saivanerikoodam temple in Bern has initiated women and non-Brahmin Hindus as priests.

== Demographics ==
In earlier reports by Federal Statistical Office, Hinduism was counted under the "other churches and communities" category. In the 2001 census there were 27,839 Hindus in Switzerland constituting 0.38% of the country's population. Most of them were Sri Lankan Tamils (81.2%) and formed 1.11% in Bern, 1% in Zurich, 0.27% in Geneva.

In the 2014 statistics report, Hinduism constituted 0.5 % of the country's population. It grew slightly to 0.6% in 2018. This value has remained stable in reports of 2019, 2022 and the recent 2024. The 2024 statistics report showed the country's population to be 9.05 million, so 0.6% corresponds to about 54,300 Hindus.

=== By Canton ===
The Cantons in Switzerland counts the religious statistics separately. Hindu population being small is often calculated under 'other religions' category. However some cantons have counted Hindu population. In the Canton of Berne, there were 6879 Hindus forming 2.85% in 2024, the Canton of Basel-Landschaft had 2044 Hindus forming 0.85% in 2019 the Canton of Lucerne had less than 2000 Hindus in 2021 and the Caton of Zurich had 10,000 to 11,000 Hindus in 2017.

The population data as per the 2000 census by Canton:

Canton	Hindu population	Hindu population (%)
Zurich	6,024	0.48%
Bern	5,991	0.63%
Lucerne	1,715	0.49%
Uri	46	0.13%
Schwyz	429	0.33%
Obwalden	82	0.25%
Nidwalden	70	0.19%
Glarus	154	0.40%
Zug	705	0.70%
Fribourg	241	0.10%
Solothurn	1,125	0.46%
Basel-Stadt	995	0.53%
Basel-Landschaft	968	0.37%
Schaffhausen	489	0.67%
Appenzell Ausserrhoden	351	0.66%
Appenzell Innerrhoden	18	0.12%
St. Gallen	1,844	0.41%
Graubünden	339	0.18%
Aargau	3,193	0.58%
Thurgau	1,134	0.50%
Ticino	437	0.14%
Vaud	1,002	0.16%
Valais	116	0.04%
Neuchâtel	509	0.30%
Geneva	665	0.16%
Jura	37	0.05%
Switzerland	27,839	0.38%

=== Other estimates ===
According to the Swiss umbrella organization for Hinduism, there are 50,000 Hindus in Switzerland. There is also an ISKCON community in Switzerland with about 400 members and a circle of about 2000 friends and sympathizers.

According to other estimates, there are about 42,000 Sri Lankan Tamil Hindus, about 8,000 Indian Hindus and about 4,000 to 6,000 sympathisers or devotees of global Hindu guru organisations. In addition, there are practitioners of Hindu Kriyā Yoga estimated to be less than 1,000. The ISKCON movement has an estimated followers between hundreds to a few thousands.

== Temples and organisations ==
Schweizerischen Dachverband für Hinduismus or The Swiss Federation for Hinduism is the main Hindu association in Switzerland. It was formed in 2017. The Centre Védantique in Geneva was founded by Swami Yatiswarananda in the 1930s, then called the 'Vedanta Centre'. Associated with Swami Ramakrishna, the centre hosts pujas, talks, and meditation sessions.

As of 2016, there are 22 temples in Switzerland with majority of them located in industrial zones, underground or near waste incinerators.

- Sri Sivasubramaniar Temple - Adliswil, Zürich was established in 1994.
- Arulmigu Sivan Temple - Glattbrugg, Zürich was established in 1994.
- Sri Vishnu Thurkkai Amman Temple - Dürnten, Zürich was established in 2010.
- Sri Manonmani Ampal Temple - Trimbach, Solothurn
- Saivanerikoodam - Bern
- Hare Krishna Temple - Zurich, established in 1980. Its the first Hindu temple in Switzerland.
- Hare Krishna Temple - Geneva
- Amman Hindu Temple - Root, Canton of Lucerne.
- Murugan Temple - Adliswil, Zürich.

== See also ==
- Religion in Switzerland
