= Felicitas Zürcher =

Swiss playwright

Felicitas Zürcher (born 1973) is a Swiss playwright. She is head dramaturge at the Bern Theatre, and has worked at the Maxim Gorki Theater in Berlin, the Deutsches Theater Berlin and the Staatsschauspiel Dresden previously. She has taught at the Folkwang University of the Arts and was head of the Dresden Acting Studio at the University of Music and Theatre Leipzig.

== Life ==
Zürcher was born in 1973 in Olten, Switzerland. She studied German, philosophy and social and economic history at the University of Zurich and the Humboldt University Berlin. In Zurich, she was assistant director at the Theater am Neumarkt and, after her studies, a consultant at a PR agency. From 2001 to 2003 she was assistant director at Maxim Gorki Theater in Berlin and in 2004 she became dramaturge for drama and dance at the Stadttheater Bern. From 2004 to 2009 she was dramaturge at the Deutsches Theater Berlin under Bernd Wilms and Oliver Reese. From 2009 to 2016 she worked at the Staatsschauspiel Dresden under artistic director Wilfried Schulz and was also head of the Dresden Acting Studio at the University of Music and Theatre Leipzig from 2011 to 2016. From 2016 until 2021, she has taught at the Folkwang University of the Arts.

For the 2016/17 season, Zürcher moved to the Düsseldorfer Schauspielhaus as head dramaturg. Since the 2021/2022 season, Zürcher is head dramaturge at the Bern Theatre. Zücher has initiated a variety of activities including a conference, panel discussions and a “Monday Café” for refugees.

Zürcher has been on the jury for the Mülheim Dramatic Prize.
