= Sri Vishnu Thurkkai Amman Temple =

Swiss Hindu temple

Coordinates: 47°17′0″N 8°51′0″E

The Sri Vishnu Thurkkai Amman Temple is a Hindu temple located in the municipality of Dürnten in the canton of Zürich in Switzerland.

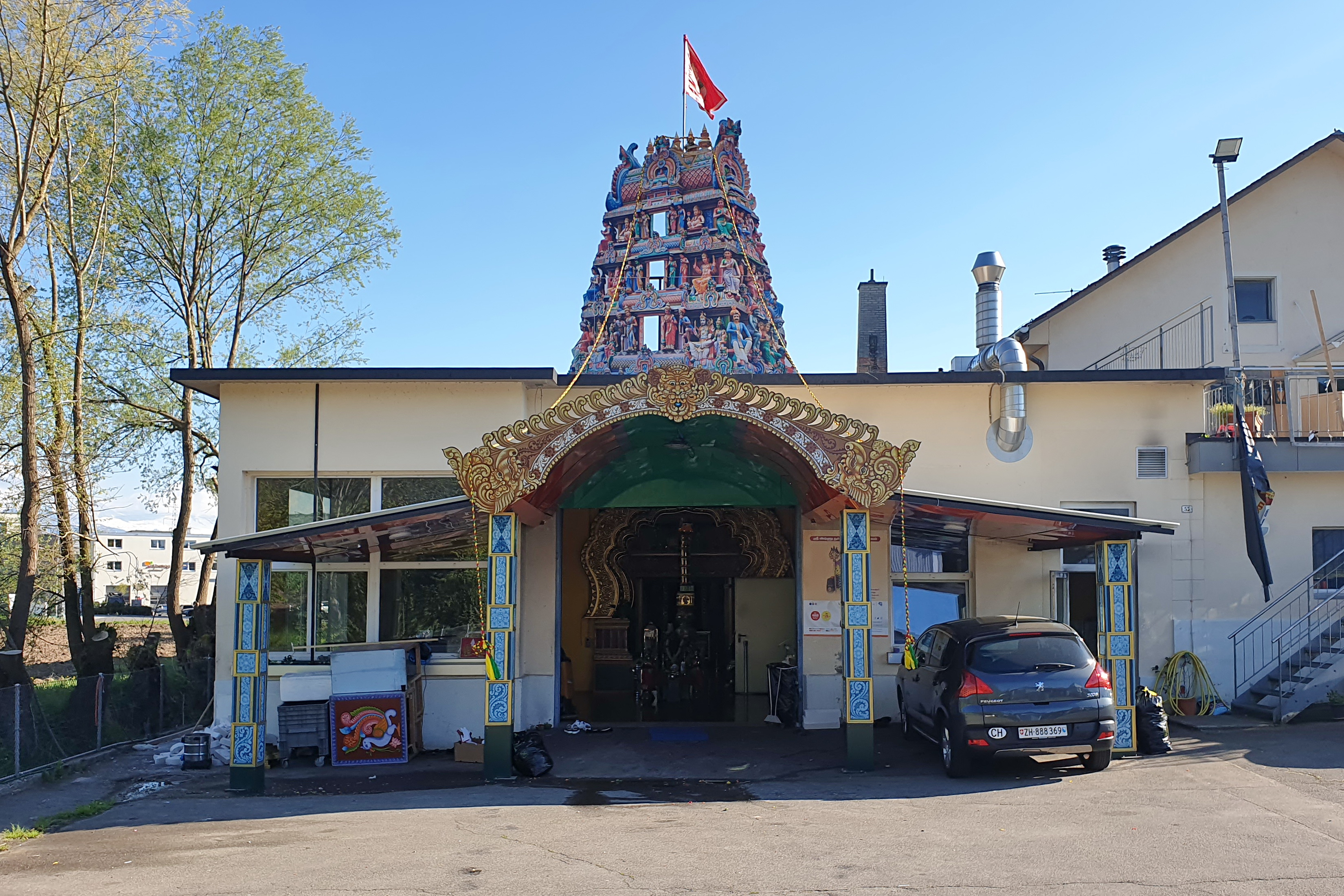
Entrance of the building in April 2022

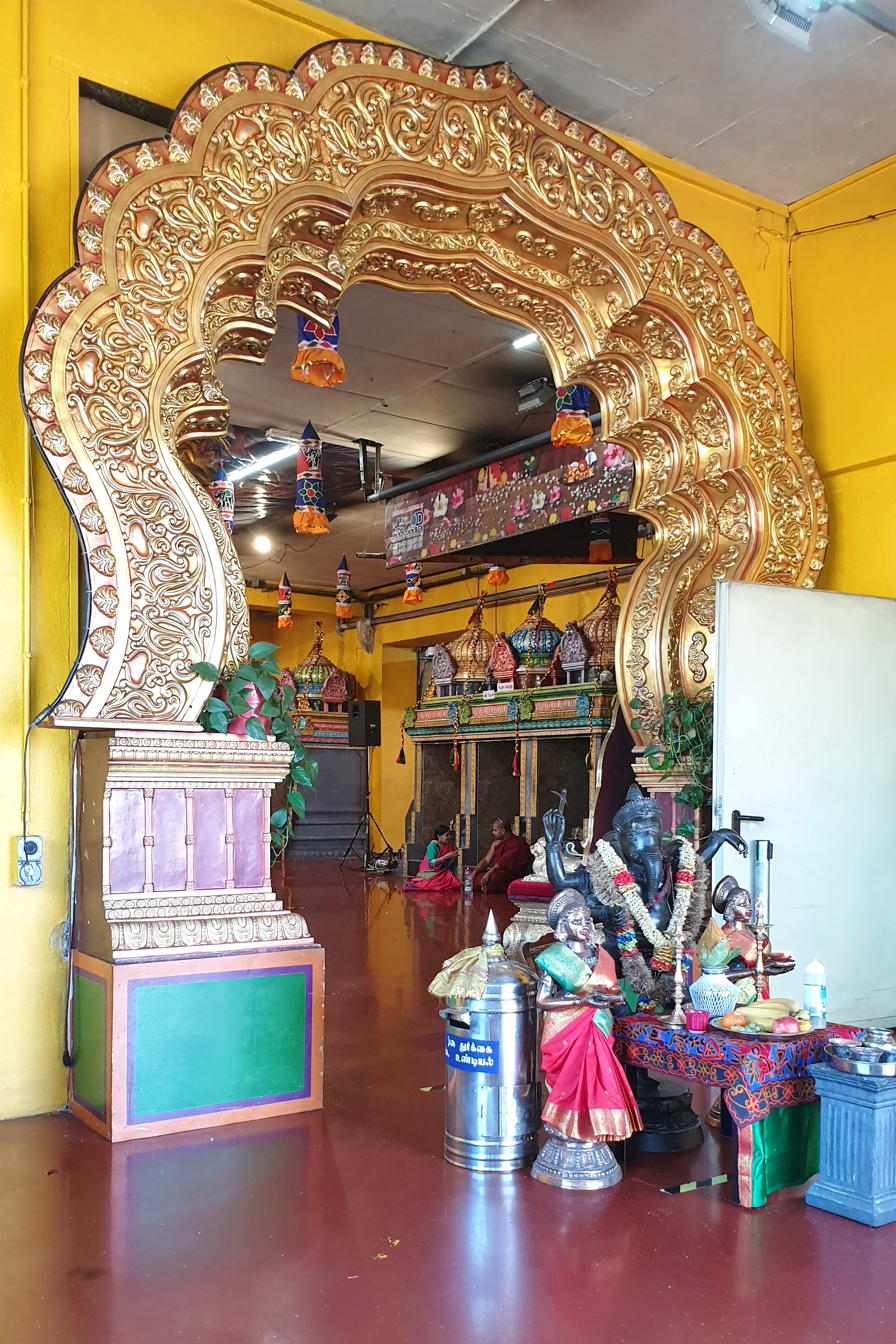
Gate and interior

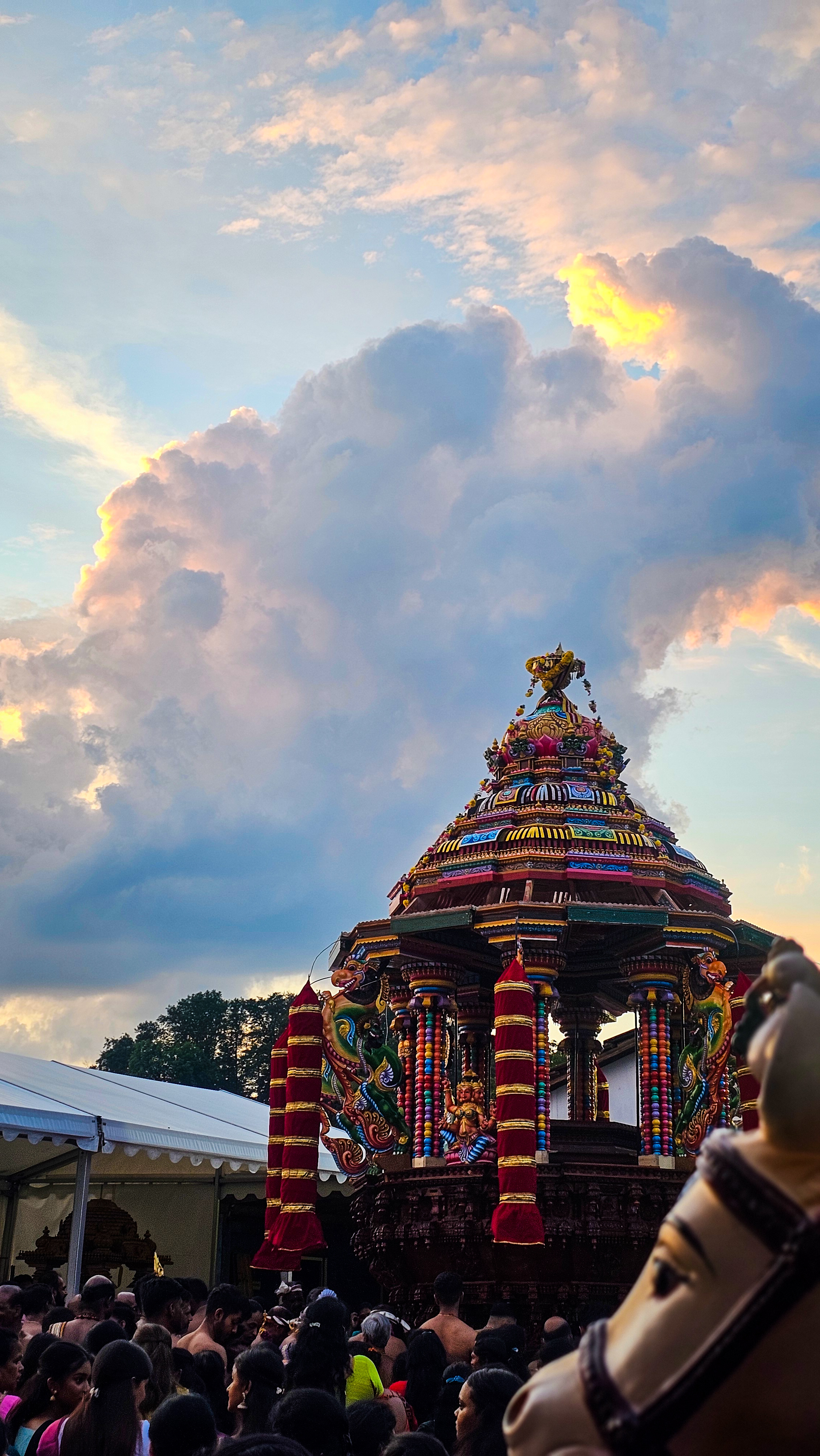
The New Chariot (2024)

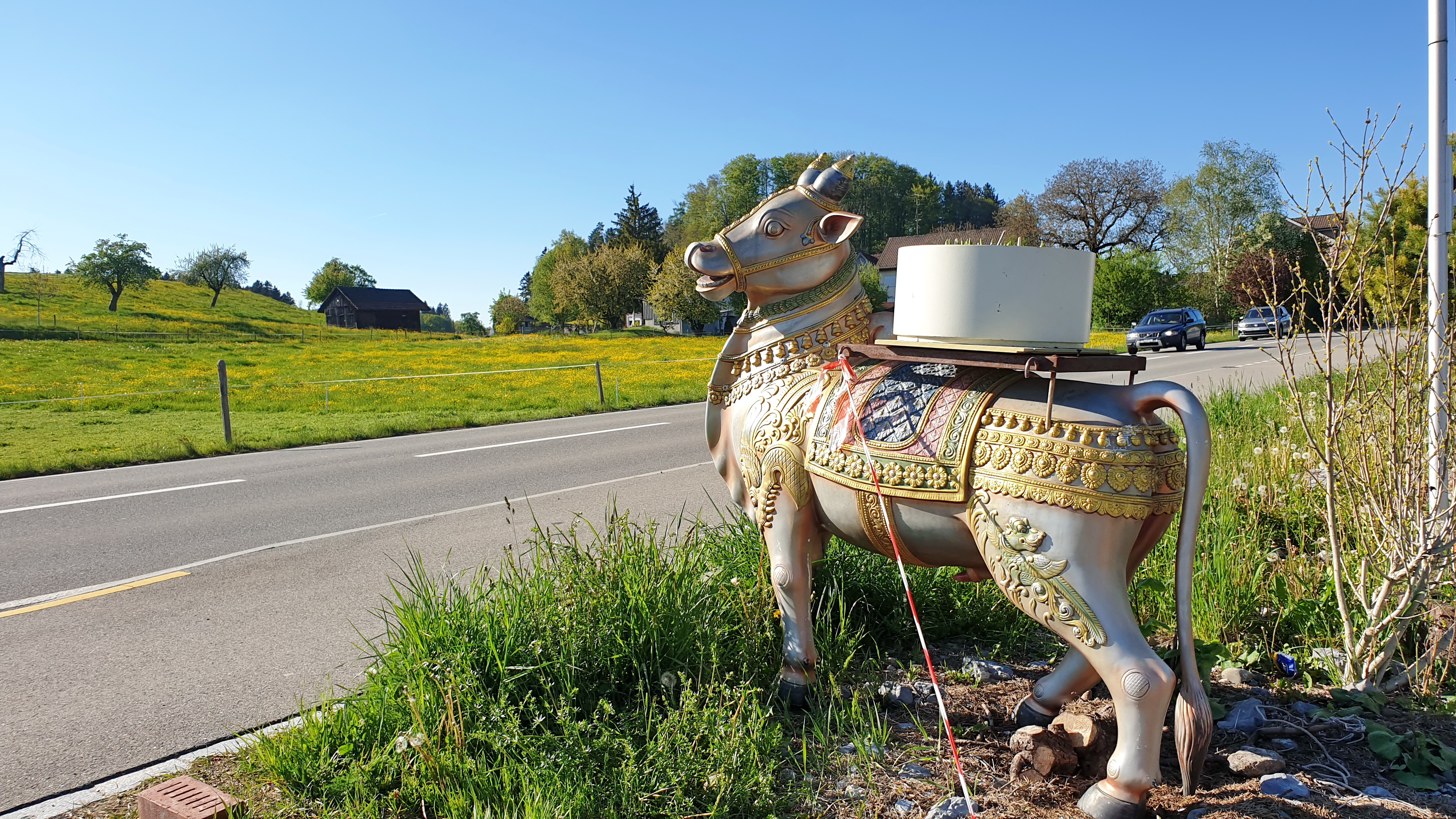
Nandi at the road between Dürnten and Hinwil

== History ==
In the 1990s, an interreligious society was established in the canton of Zürich to support the foundation of a centre for spiritual and cultural care of Tamil people in Switzerland, as well as to preserve and maintain the Tamil culture of the approximatively 35,000 (around 20,000 in the canton of Zürich) Tamil people of Sri Lankan origin living in Switzerland. So, the Sri Sivasubramaniar Temple in Adliswil was founded imas a non-profit foundation in 1994. While some 5,000 Indian Hindus in Switzerland founded their own cultural associations, but not a temple, the Tamil Hindus opened 19 houses of worship since the 1990s. Because the premises in Adliwil have become too small, the community decided also to move to Dürnten.

The opening ceremony was set on 27 January 2010, although the granting of the canton of Zurich for the opening was not given yet. The temple's priest Kurukkal told in an interview, according to the Hindu horoscope, the temple had to be opened in January. Because the building is located at a cantonal road, there is even needed the granting of the canton, thus to the municipal permission was given, but therefore the municipality could not formerly grant the approval for the construction. The municipal council of Dürnten supported the plans for the temple. To express his goodwill to the Tamil community, in November 2009 the municipal president participated of the ritual worship, which took place in the context of the laying of the foundation stone. Initiated was the construction by the Sri Vishnuthurkkai Amman community by Swiss Tamil citizens. In addition to several local craftsmen, eight men from South India have collaborated to build the temple.

== Temple's building ==
The temple is located in a pre-existing warehouse, with floor heating, new sewer lines and a new kitchen subsequently installed. The main altar is located in the middle of the biggest room. Several lions, the mounts of the Hindu Goddess Durga, enthrone on the dome above the decorated portal, as well as the deities and the other colorful altars with their small turrets, which were built on the walls of the room – they all were shipped from India. The Temple is located at Ediker Strasse 24, 8635 Dürnten.

== Cultural and religious life ==
To move from the Sihl Valley to Dürnten was "perfect" – among other things, the building is furthermore located in a valley and on a stream, as for the temple festival the flowing water is of particular importance.

Every Friday evening between 100 and 150 people attend the Pooja, and on other weekdays 10 to 20 attend. Six services per day are held. Usually in July a ten-day temple festival, dedicated to the Hindu Goddess Durga, is celebrated, having about 4,000 visitors.

== Photos ==
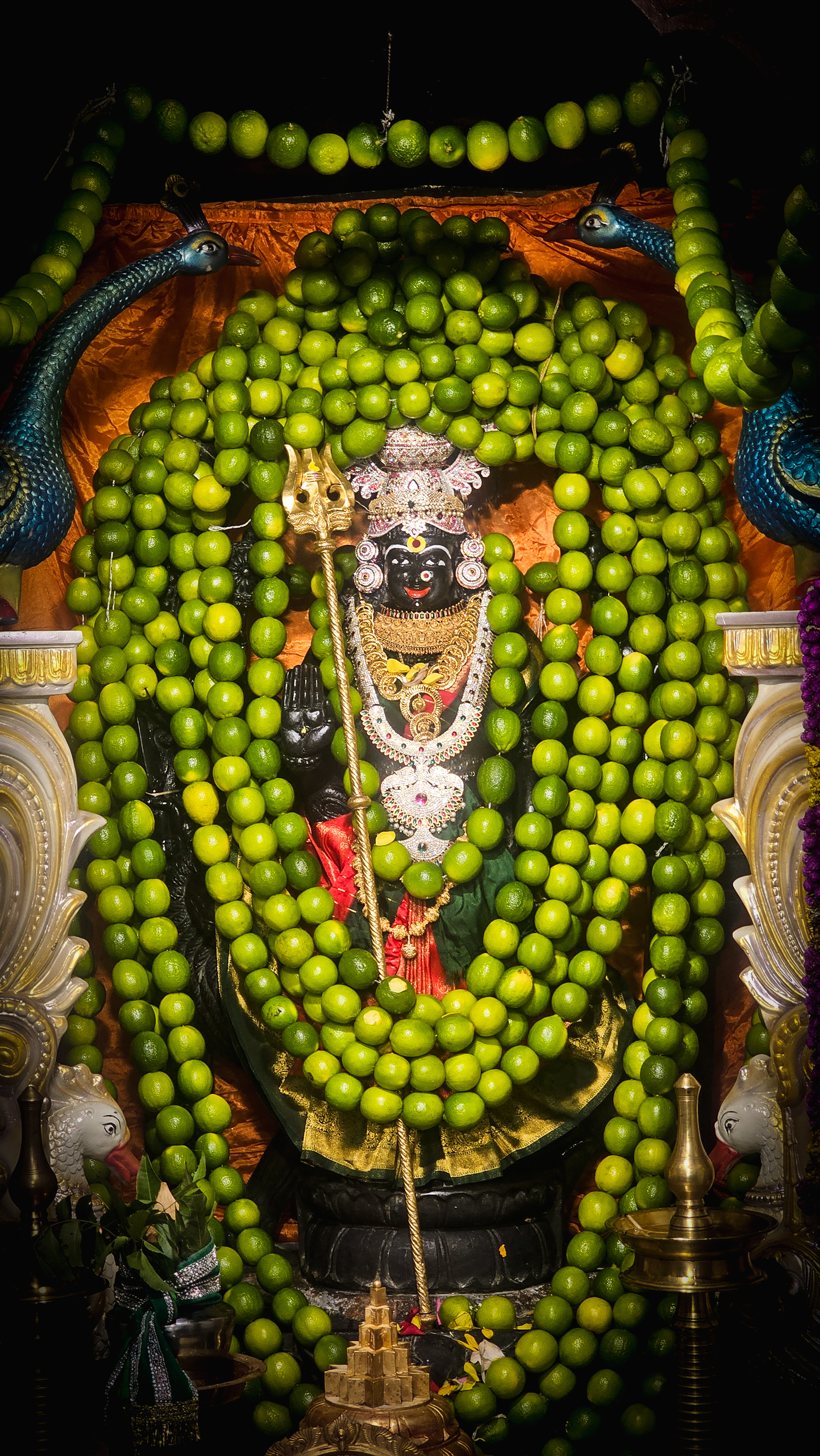

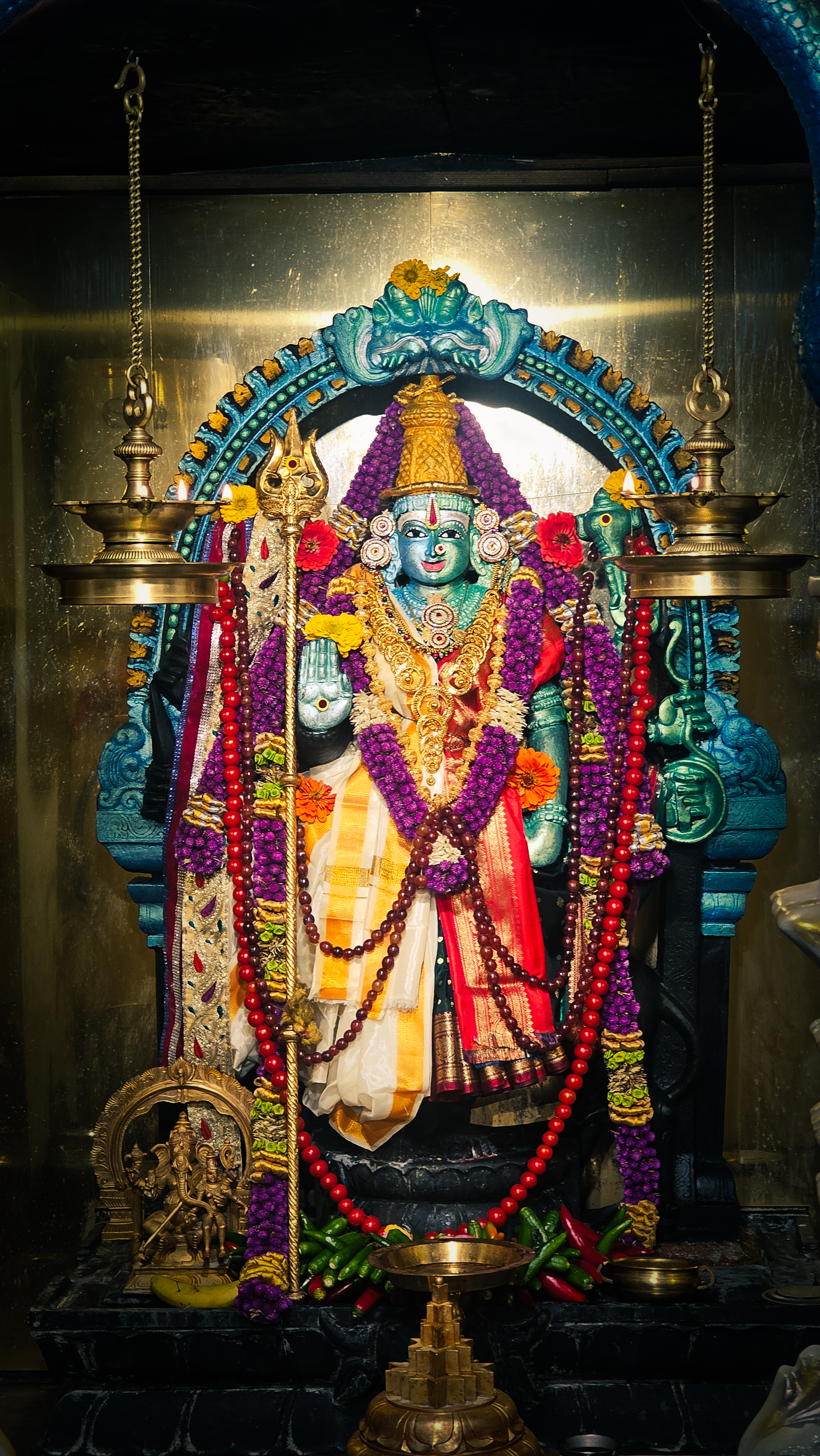

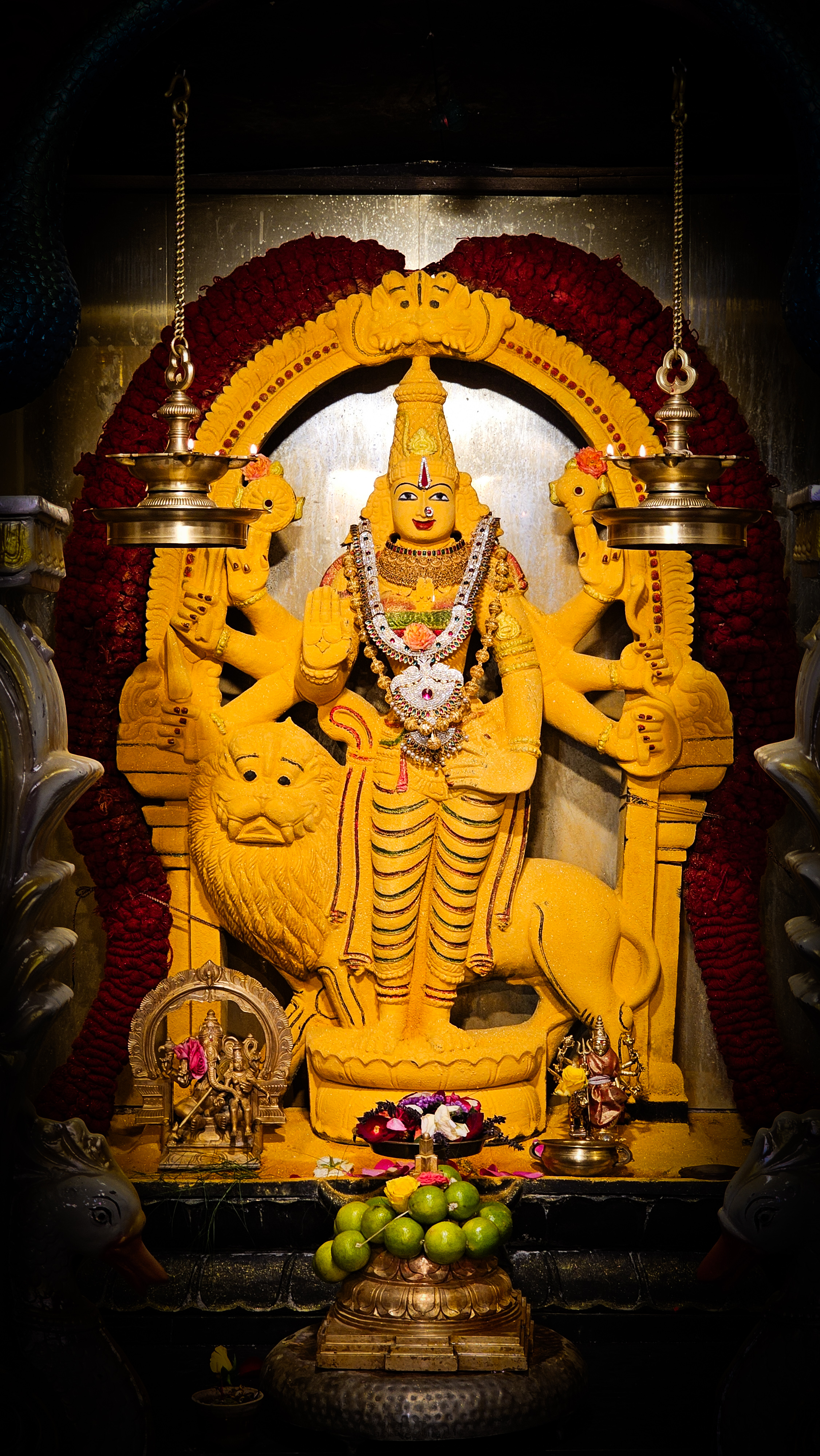

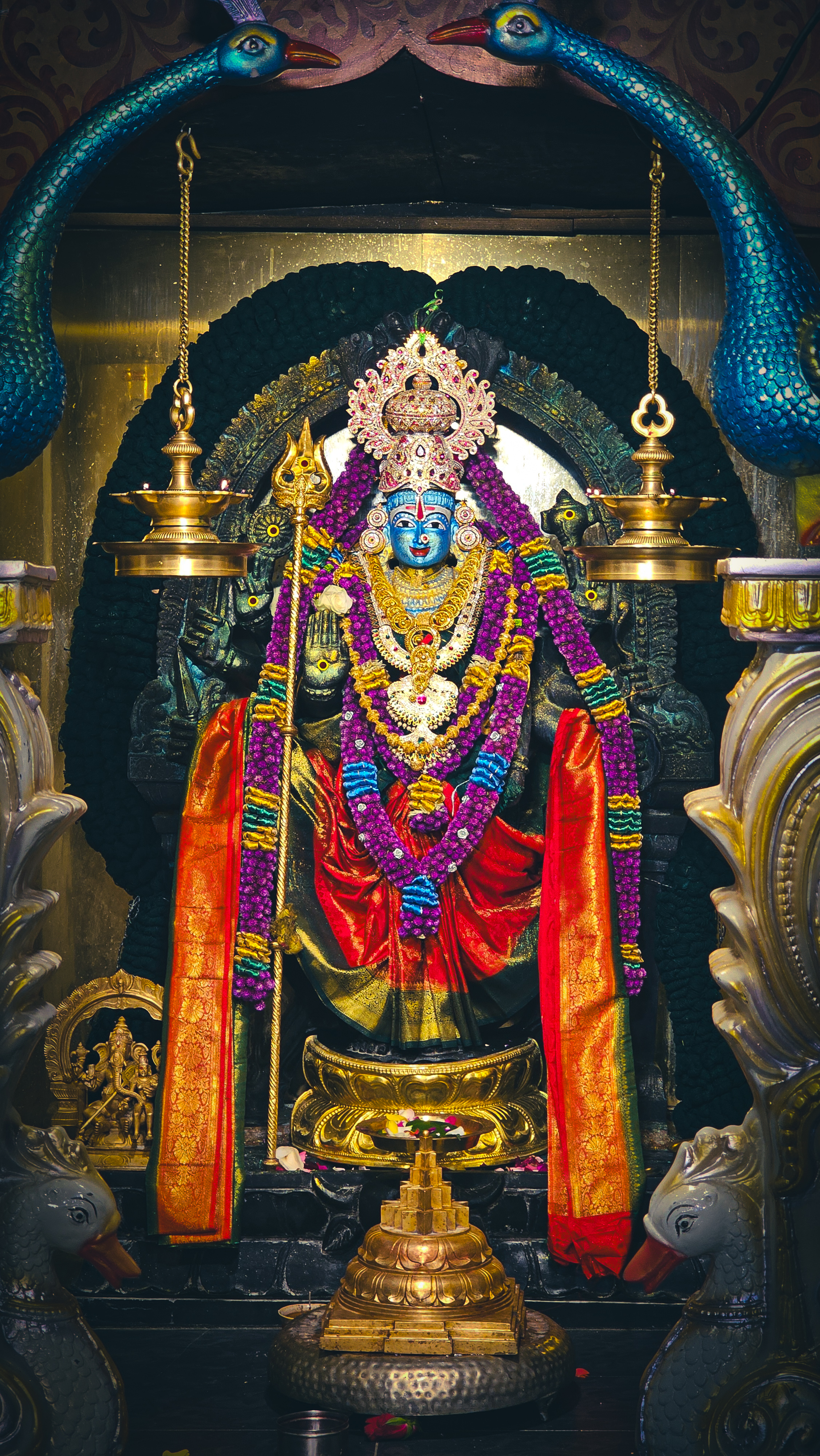

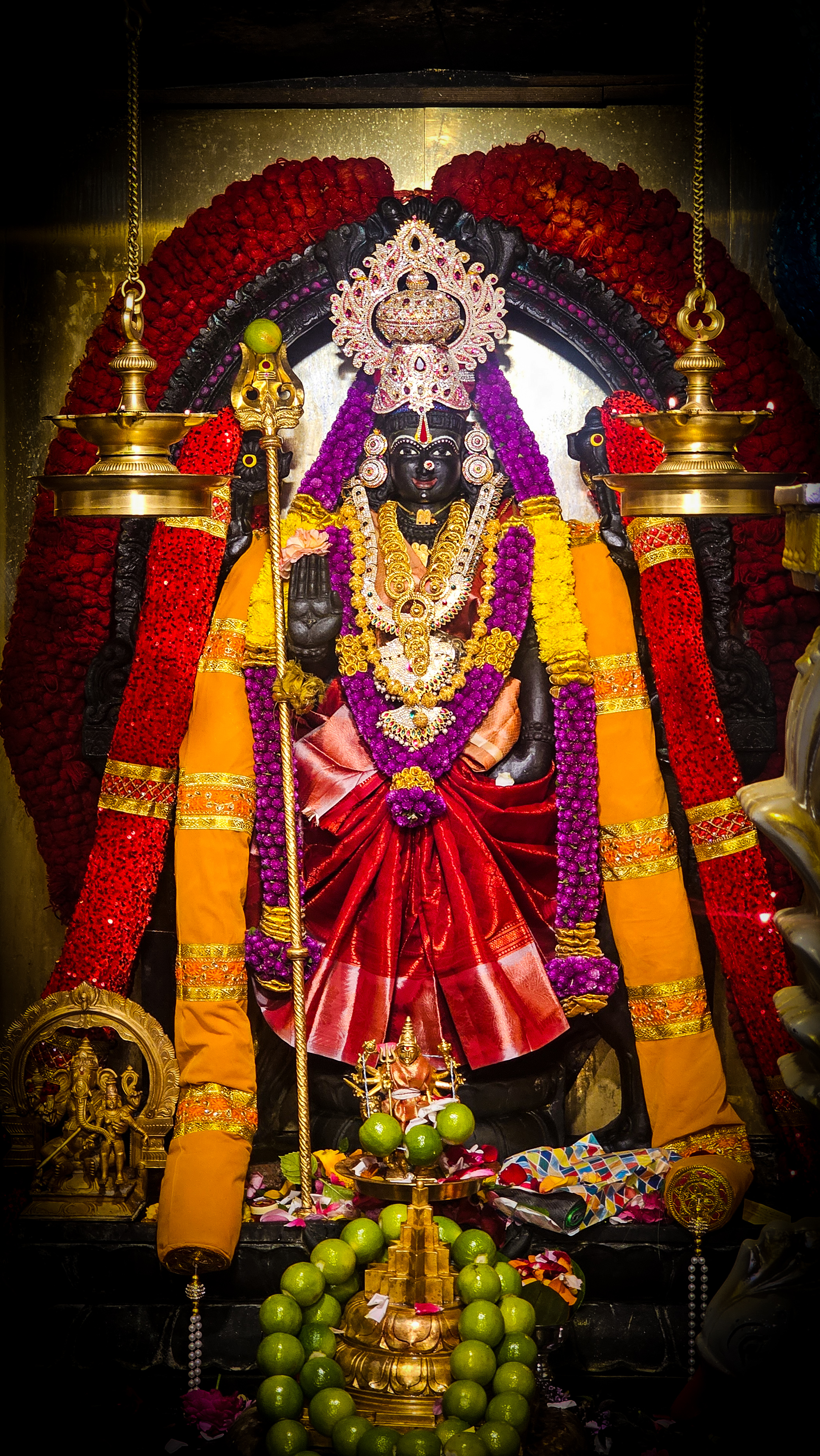

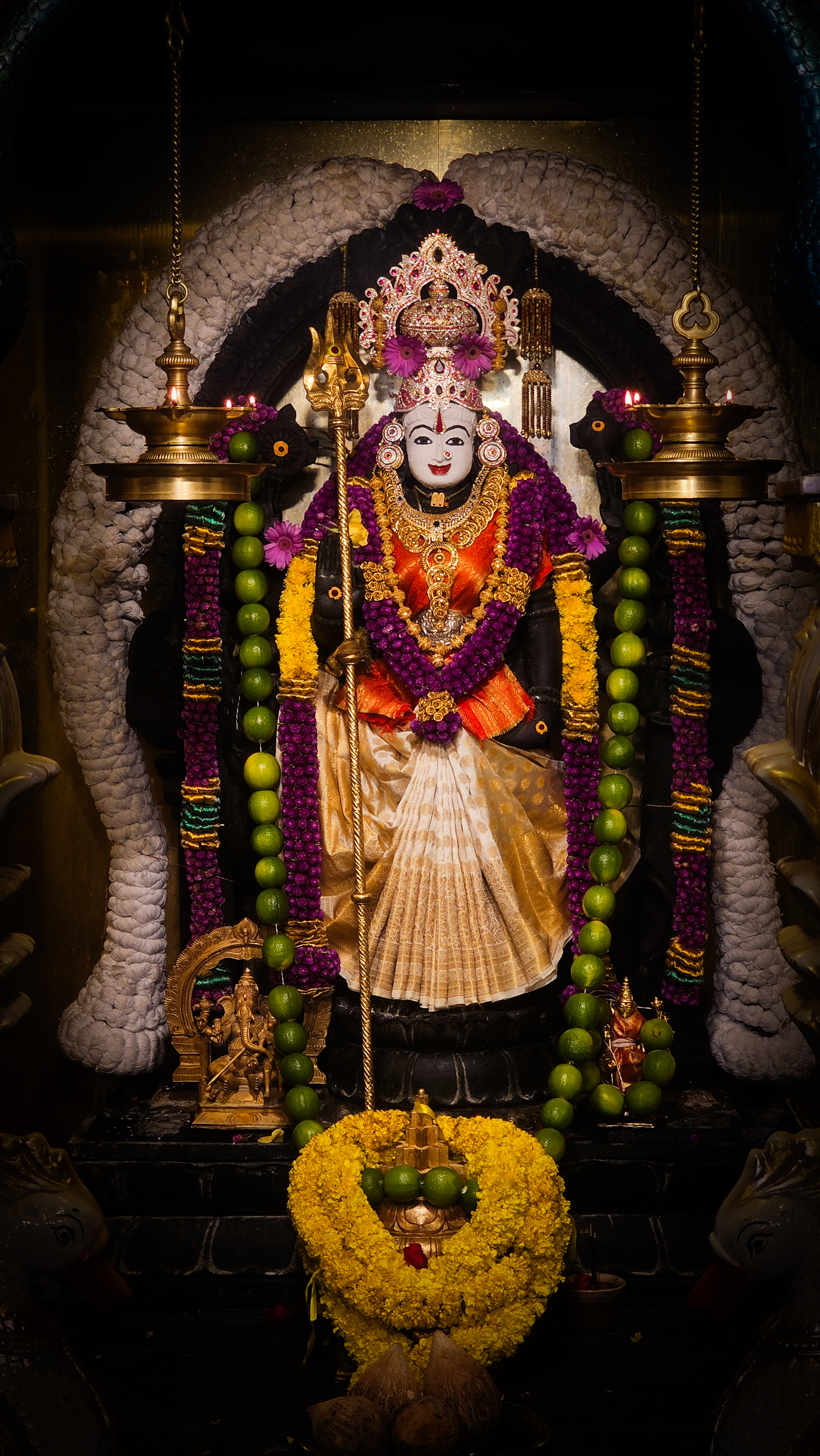

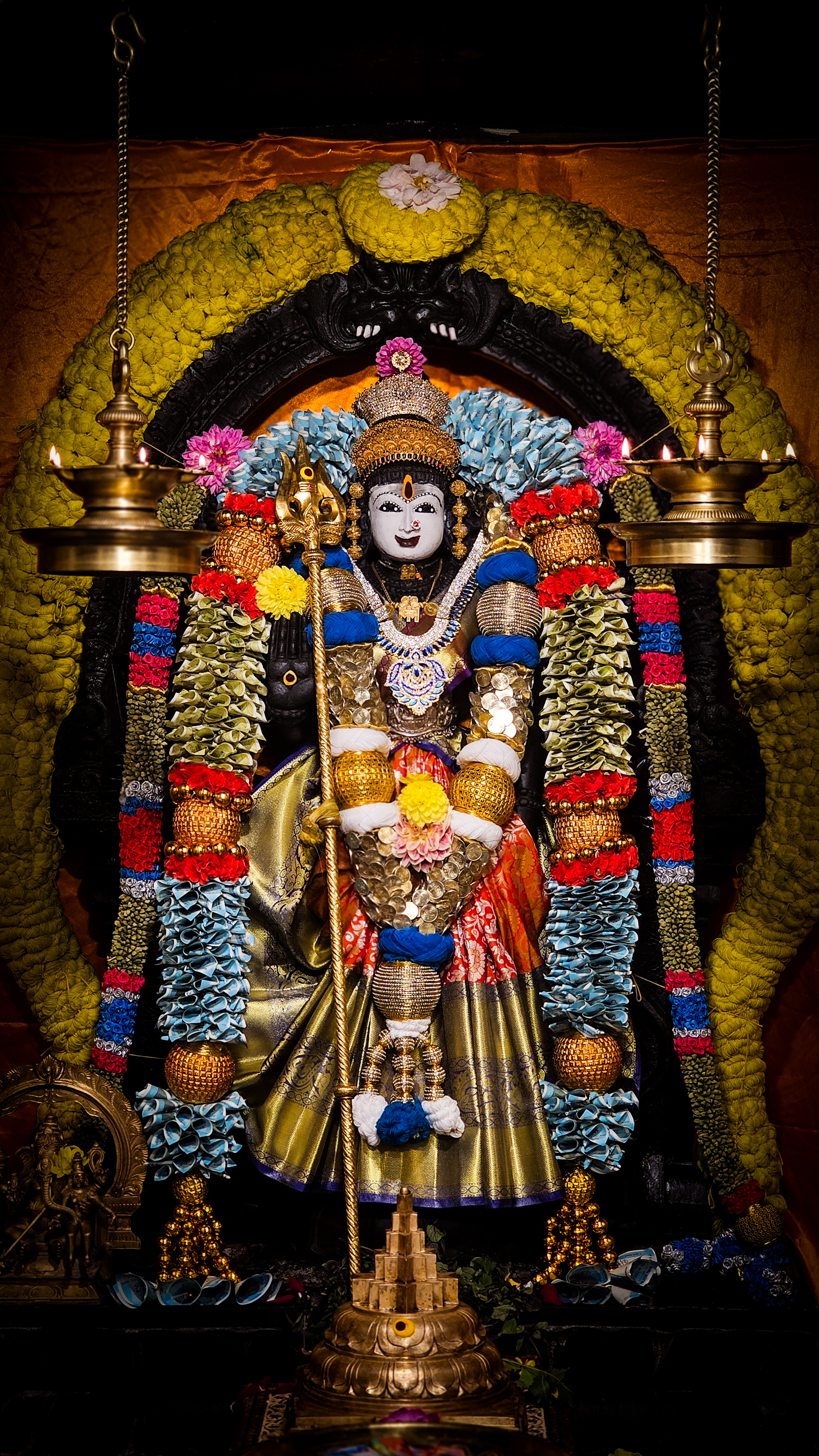

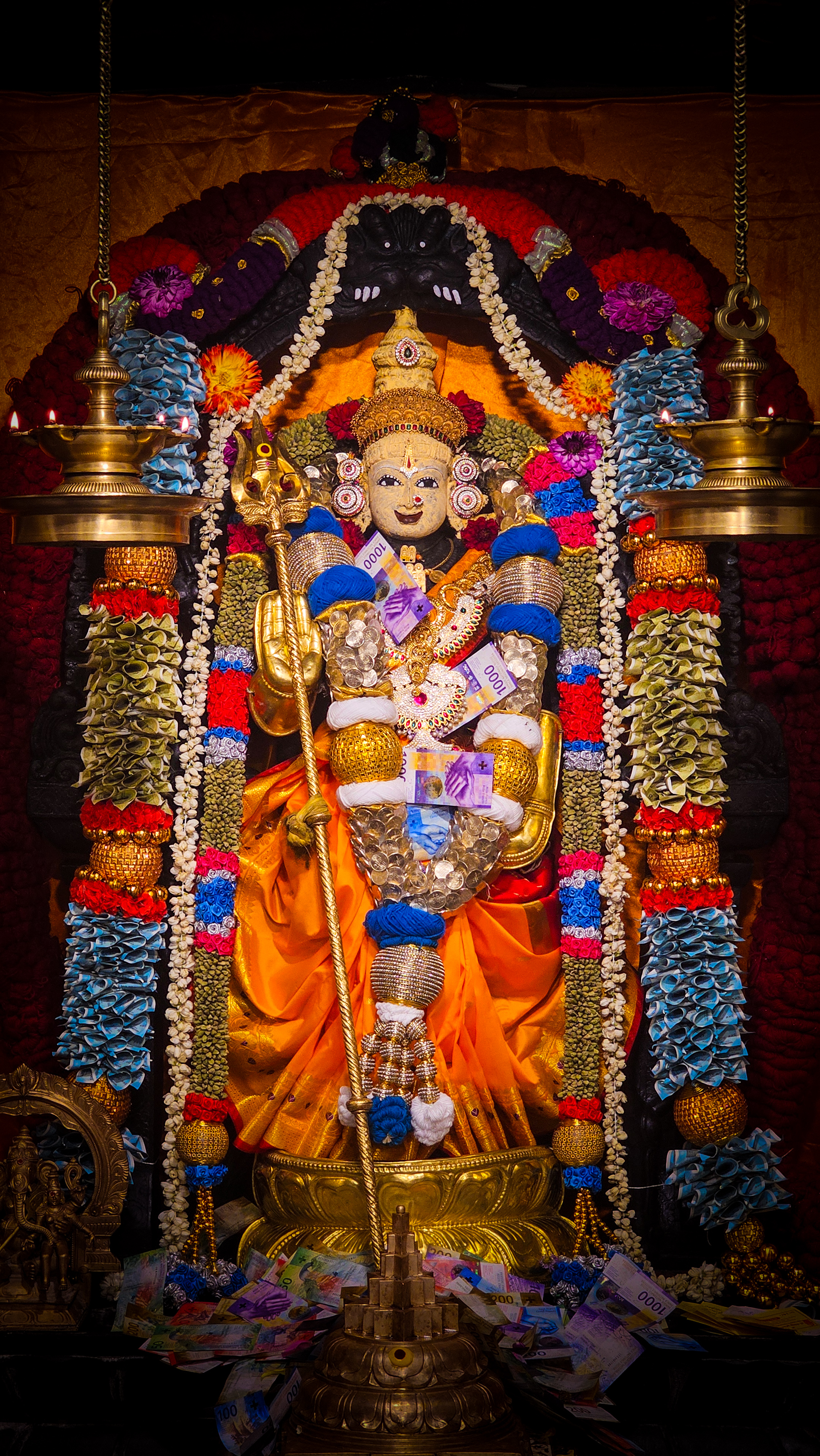

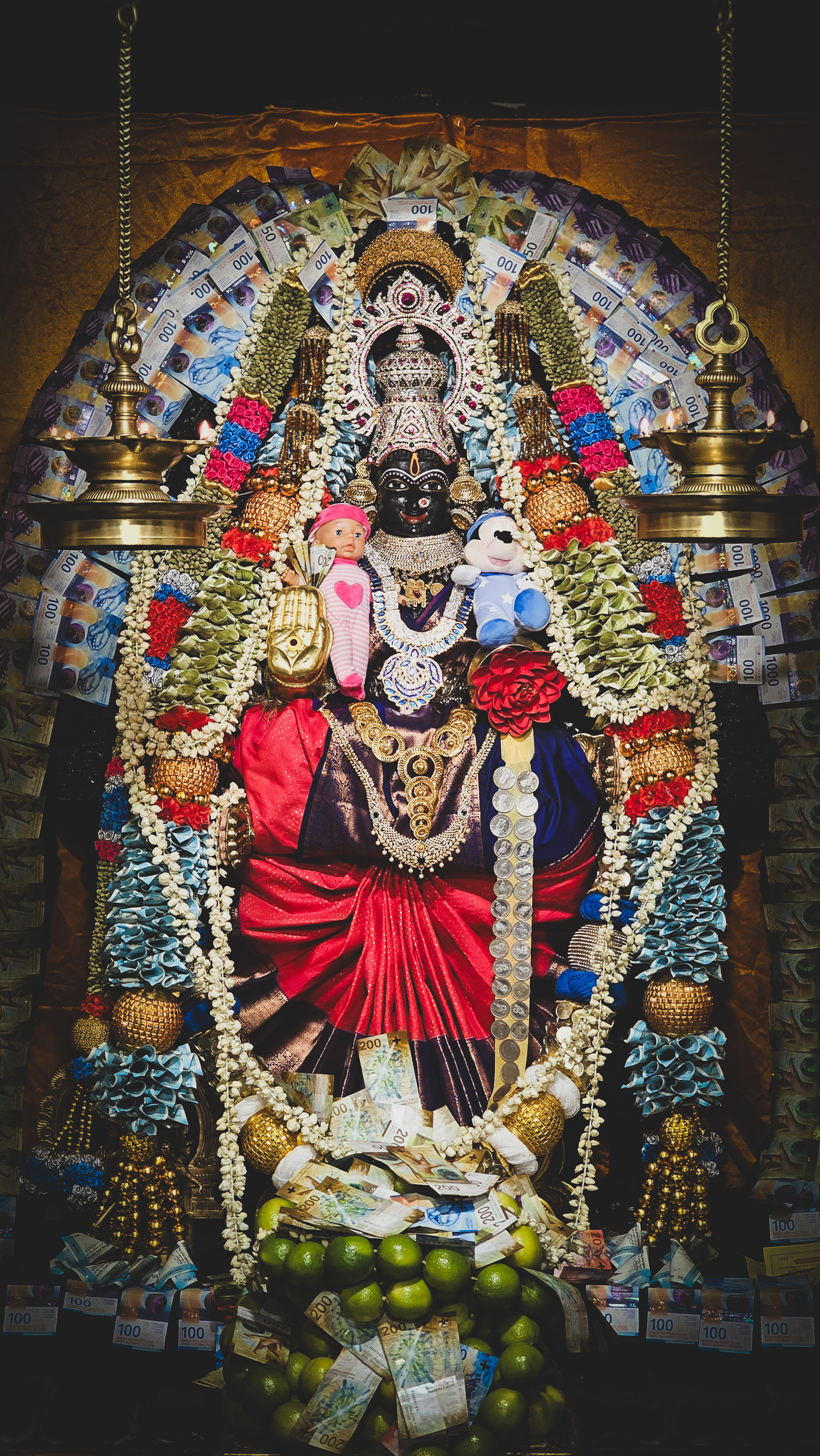
Mahalakshmi

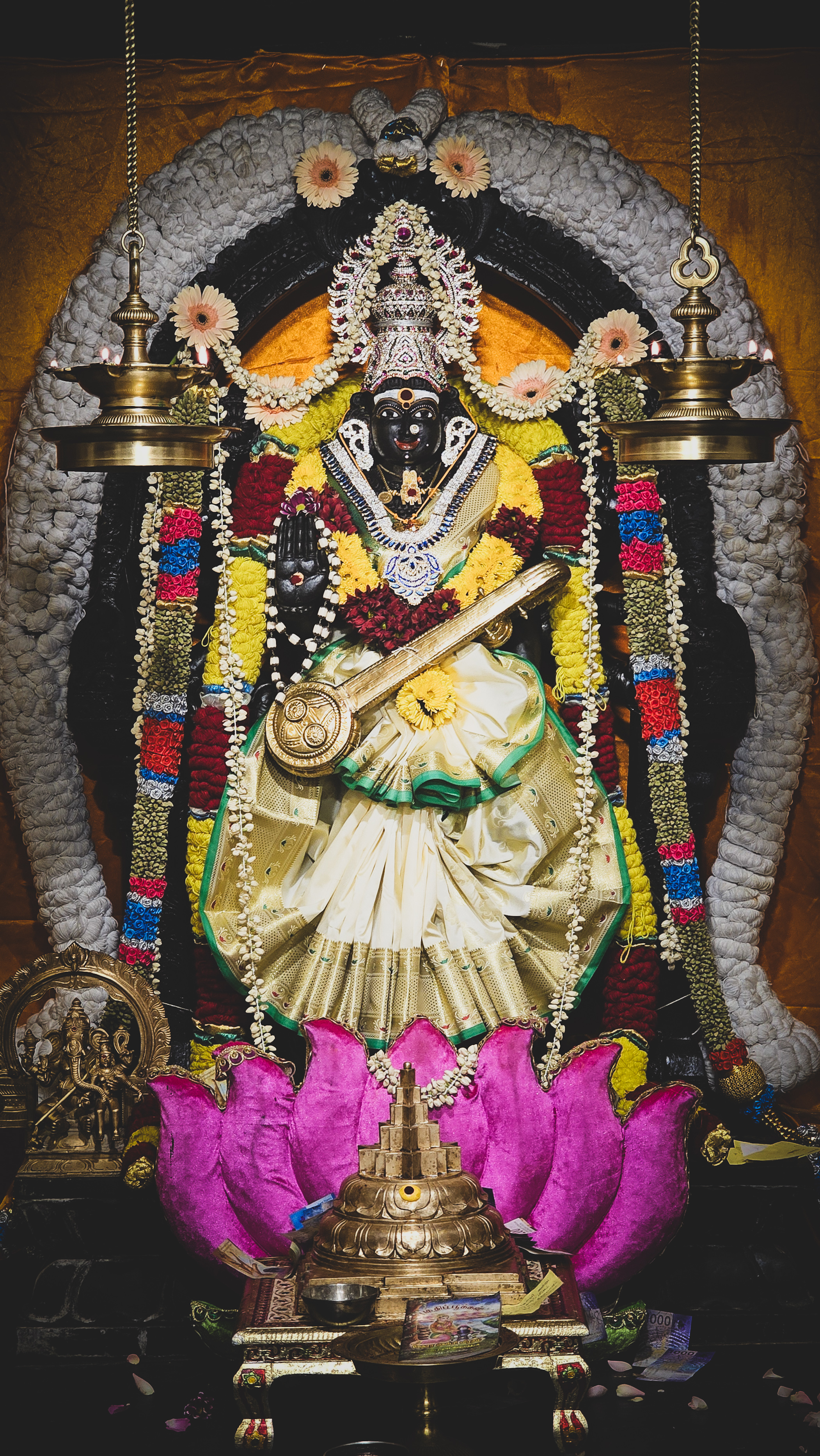

== See also ==
- Hinduism in Switzerland
- List of Hindu temples in Switzerland

== Website & Social Media ==
- Official website
- Sri Vishnu Thurkkai Amman Temple on Facebook
- Sri Vishnu Thurkkai Amman Temple's channel on YouTube
- Sri Vishnu Thurkkai Amman Temple on TikTok
- Sri Vishnu Thurkkai Amman Temple on Instagram
