= House of Religions =

Inter-religious building in Bern, Switzerland

(in English) House of Religions - Dialogue of Cultures (in German) Haus der Religionen - Dialog der Kulturen (in French) Maison des religions
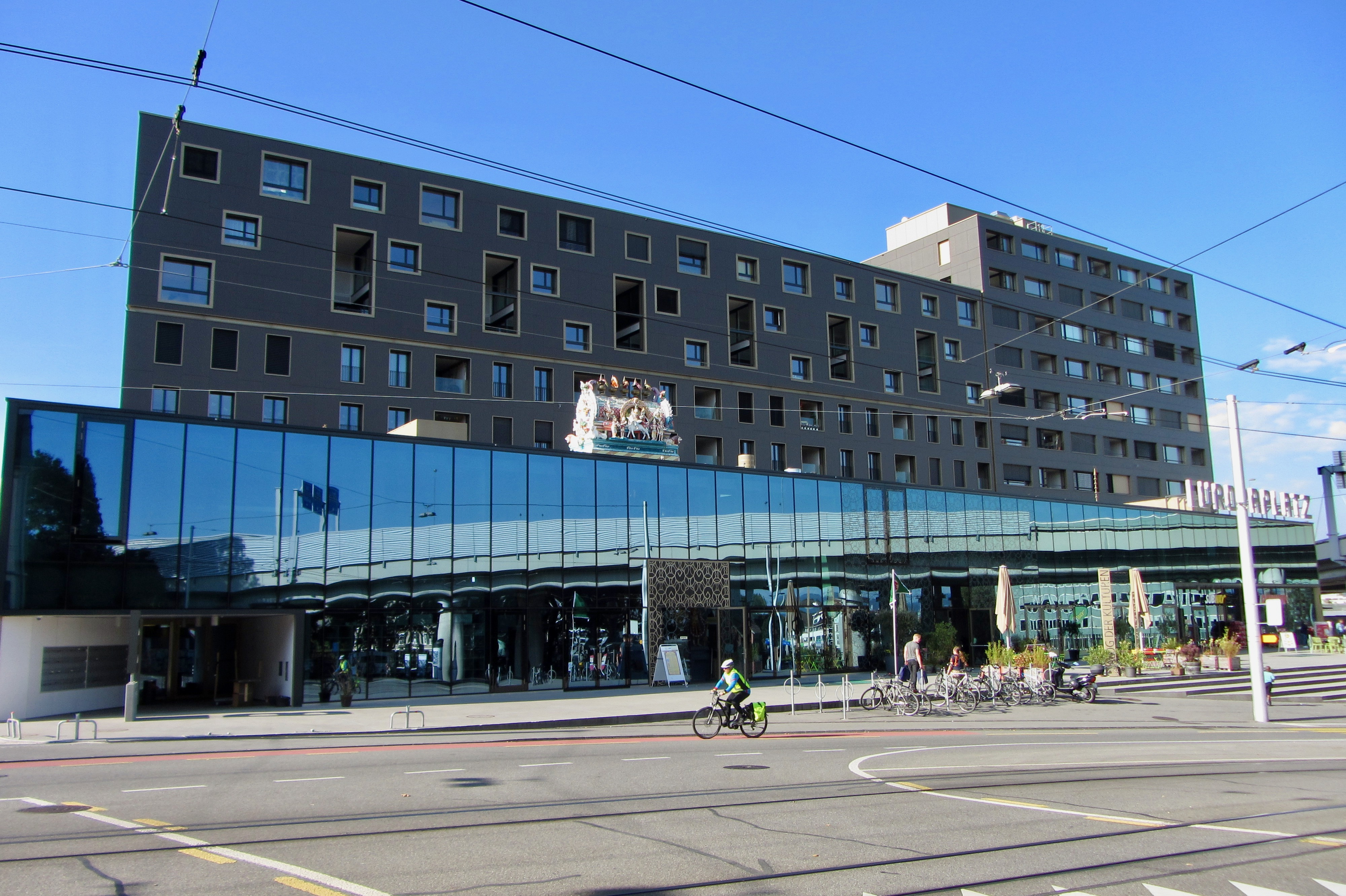

Religion
- Affiliation: Alevism, Buddhism, Christianity, Hinduism, Islam, Sikhism, Baháʼí Faith, Judaism

Location
- Location: Europaplatz 1; 3008 Bern; Switzerland
- Interactive map of (in English) House of Religions - Dialogue of Cultures (in German) Haus der Religionen - Dialog der Kulturen (in French) Maison des religions

Architecture
- Completed: 2014
- Construction cost: 50,000,000 CHF in all, around 15,000,000 CHF for the religious centre

Website
- Official website

The House of Religions - Dialogue of Cultures (German: Haus der Religionen - Dialog der Kulturen; French: Maison des religions) is a Swiss inter-religious institution in the city of Bern in Switzerland that houses worship rooms for eight faiths in one single building.

== History ==
In the 2000s started the plans to establish a cultural institution of Jewish, Christian, Islamic, Buddhist and Hindu faith traditions, and on 25 April 2002 the association "Haus der Religionen – Dialog der Kulturen" (meaning "House of Religions - Dialogue of Cultures") was established. In March 2006 the "Stiftung Europaplatz" foundation was founded, which raised the necessary funds for the project, including sacred spaces, among others for Hindu and Buddhist communities, of the Alevis and the Council of Christian Churches in the canton of Bern (AKiB). In the beginning, the Jewish community of Bern and the Baháʼí Faith community did not wish to set up own rooms, but ideally supported the project. The cantonal Islamic Umma association has withdrawn from the project after initial concessions, but the Muslim association Hochfeldstrasse, however, was interested to participate.

== Building ==
The building includes, besides the house of religions, 88 apartments, shops, catering services and offices on a floor area of approximately 30,000 square metres (35,880 sq yd). The location Europaplatz is situated in Bern-Ausserholligen, and served by S-Bahn, Tram Bern West, bus lines and the motorway junction. The Bern main train station and the city centre are accessible in a few minutes.

The city of Bern granted planning permission for the project in April 2007 with a cost of about 50 million Swiss Francs, of which about 15 million Swiss Francs were related to the Haus der Religionen. The construction was delayed several times; the ground-breaking ceremony took place on 27 June 2012. On 14 December 2014 the building was inaugurated and opened for the public use.

== Inauguration ==
Christians, Alevis, Muslims, Hindus and Buddhists in their church, Dargah, mosque, temples and centre now celebrate their cults. The religious communities celebrated the indentation in the newly built glass building on the Europaplatz square in the west of Bern on 14 December 2014 with thousands of visitors. While religious wars play anywhere in the world, we here get the opportunity to get to know other religions, a Sikh visitor told, and a Krishna monk tells in the Mosque, that Muslims pray daily five times, is discipline for my own religion. A young Albanian Muslim family is pleased with the open setting in the house: "I'm hip-hopper, my wife wears a headscarf. No reasons to condemn a people are both". And the non-denominational fellow hopes, "the House can help to break down stereotypes".

Some of these religious communities lived so far in back yards or basements. The foundation provided funding to the (as of December 2014) five religious communities, and had to provide for the interior fittings and payments of the rental fees. Also the Bernese Jews, Baháʼí, and Sikhs are members of the association, which operates the house.

== Aims ==
The House of religions is used by cultural and religious communities of the city and the canton of Bern that previously had no rooms adapted to their needs. They represent Alevi, Christian, Islamic, Buddhist and Hindu faiths. Partners in the dialogue are also the Jewish community, the Baháʼís and Sikhs. A dialogue of cultures, access to experience, knowledge and spirituality of other cultures and religions are taught, as they have been found in the Bern region their home. Haus der Religionen will provide a center of excellence for dialogue its services. Everyone involved in the project knows the inviolable dignity of the human being, the idea of tolerance and mutual respect obliged. We were dreamers, utopians, do-gooders far from any reality, said Guido Albisetti, president of the association. But now the Haus der Religionen is built, and past experience showed that the common dialog is possible and fruitful.

According to the operators, the architecture of the building allows the various communities to engage with each other, but also to withdraw. The building's design enables that the sacred spaces on either side of a so-called dialog area are accessible to everyone, and therefore are arranged on two floors.

== Common space ==
Immediately after the opening ceremony the versatile cultural program was launched, lasting until March 2015 opening events. The restaurant Vanakam is the central meeting place, where every day different delicacies are prepared, so also an Ayurveda vegetarian lunch. Of the eight religions, five have set up own prayer rooms, connected by dialog zones.

The two largest facilities will be the mosque with about 500 square metres (598 sq yd) and the Hindu temple with about 800 square metres (957 sq yd). Alevis, Christians and Buddhists claim space in the size of 160 square metres (191 sq yd) to 180 square metres (215 sq yd). The public part with infrastructure, cafeteria, exhibition, course and event spaces comprise about 1,300 square metres (1,555 sq yd).

== Rooms of the faiths ==
=== Alevites ===
Förderverein Alevitische Kultur represents the Alevite faith. Primarily important is that people feel comfortable, and the ritual small fire pit will be a symbol of purity. In addition to the meeting and prayer room with seating for about 70 people, a children's corner. a library and a room for religious instruction and a kitchenette are provided, based on budget and furnishings collected amount.

=== Buddhists ===
A member of the community told in an interview of the pitfalls when setting up the Buddhist rooms, which take place at least in the common building. In the entrance area is tiny temple, besides a small information room and a room with kitchen, where a teacher may also temporarily reside. The main room is kept simple: oiled oak floors, yellow walls and a 1.2 metres (4 ft)-high sculpture of the Buddha from Thailand. So Buddhists of all currents should feel addressed. Aimed is a beautiful space, in which people in any way recognize and feel comfortable. The finances were decisive for the size of the room. Each square meter costs 110 Swiss Francs ia year, the monthly costs amount to approximately 2,000 Swiss Francs, which are paid with donations.

=== Christians ===
Interested Christians, church communities, are involved since 2009 in the Club "Kirche im Haus der Religionen".

=== Hindus ===
The Hindu temple of the Saivanerikoodam association was not yet finished in December 2014, but the interior rooms are shaped after the 'typical' South Indian temple architecture. For ten Hindu deities shrines are to be built, integrated into a temple of about 500 square metres (598 sq yd). There are also several rooms for seminars, yoga, meditation, and for cultural and language training for children and adolescents. Of central importance will be the vegetarian cuisine. For the entire interior decoration, the Hindu community expects costs of two million Swiss Francs.

=== Muslims ===
The Muslims community is represented by Muslimischer Verein, needing about 500 square metres (598 sq yd) as the second largest community. The Mosque is located on two floors, the prayer rooms for men and women are interconnected. Planned were a 200 square metres (239 sq yd) large prayer room for women and an approximately 300 square metres (359 sq yd) large room for the men. Skip offices and a café in the mosque were also planned.

== See also ==
- Religion in Switzerland
- Buddhism in Switzerland
- Hinduism in Switzerland
- Islam in Switzerland
- Judaism in Switzerland
- List of Hindu temples in Switzerland
