= Theater am Neumarkt =

Theater Neumarkt
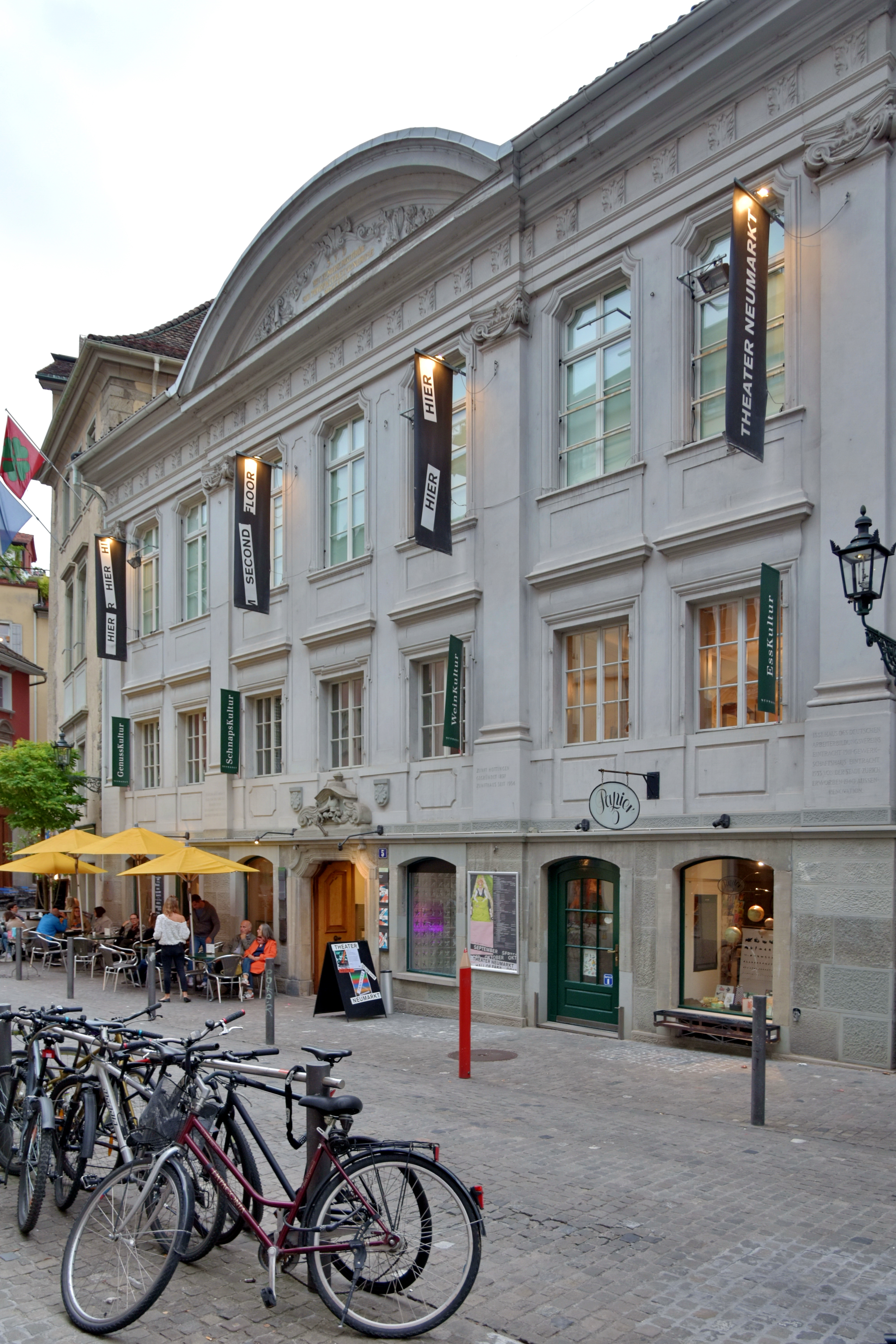
- The theater building at Neumarkt, Zürich
- Interactive map of the Theater Neumarkt area

General information
- Type: Theatre
- Location: Neumarkt, Zürich, Switzerland
- Coordinates: 47.370246°N 8.544995°E
- Completed: 1742

Technical details
- Floor count: 3

Design and construction
- Architect: David Morf

Other information
- Seating capacity: 220

The Theater am Neumarkt (English: Theater at Neumarkt) or by its present official name Theater Neumarkt is a theatre in the German-speaking Switzerland situated at Neumarkt, Zürich. It is part of the building complex Bilgeriturm–Neumarkt and also houses the Hottinger guild for two days a year.

== History ==
The building was constructed by David Morf in 1742 as the guild house of the Schumacher (shoemakers) guild and was later used as the meeting point of the Communist Party of Switzerland that was there founded in 1923. The government of the city of Zürich bought the building in 1933, since 1966 it houses the present Neumarkt Theater, as well as the Neumarkt restaurant in the ground floor.

The hall in the second floor probably was used sporadically as a venue in the 18th century by the then guild house. Since the 1940s it was in use under the name "Theater am Neumarkt" for guest performances and also served as a permanent venue, among others from 1949 to 1951 to the Cabaret Cornichon. After it had been used as an alternative site to the Schauspielhaus venue, increasingly evident occurred in the fifties and sixties for the use as a contemporary theater.

Since the start of the 2019/2020 season, Hayat Erdoğan, Tine Milz and Julia Reichert have been managing the theater as a collective. The directors are committed to an expanded concept of theater through three newly established divisions: Theater, Playground and Academy. This will continue the theater's tradition as an ensemble theater and a place for artistic experimentation. In February 2024, it was announced that Mathieu Bertholet would take over the management of the theater from the 2025/26 season.

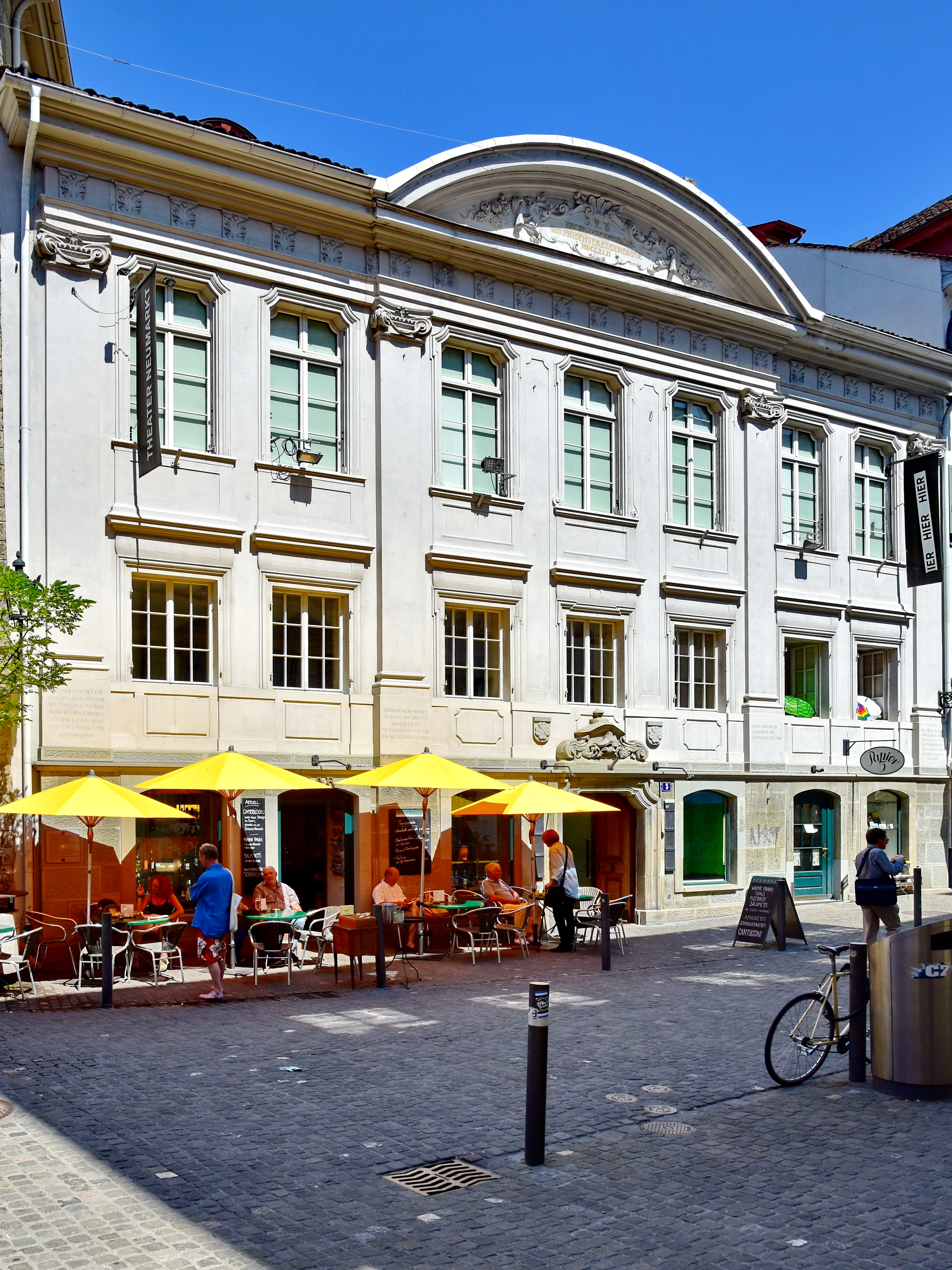

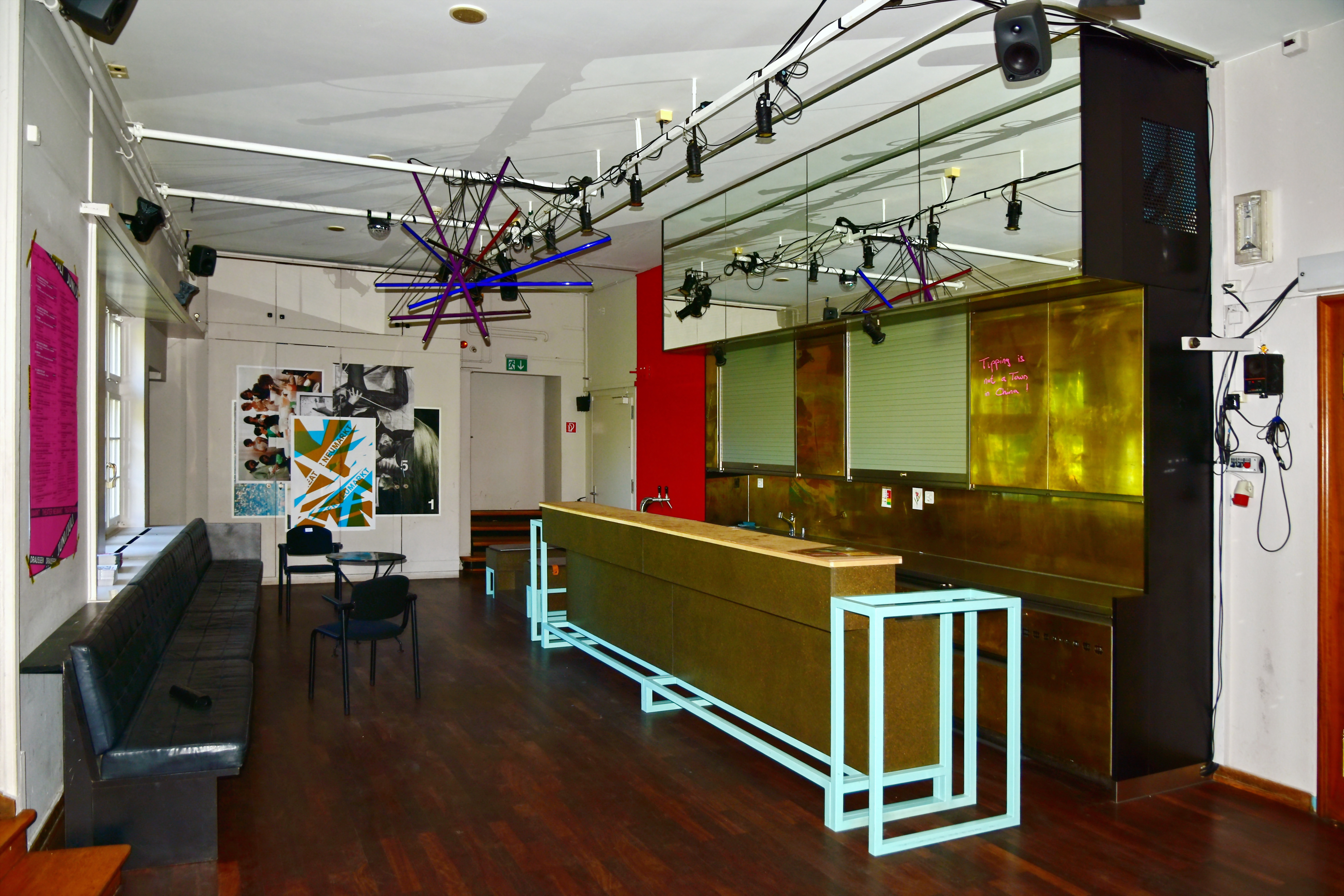
interior, 2nd floor

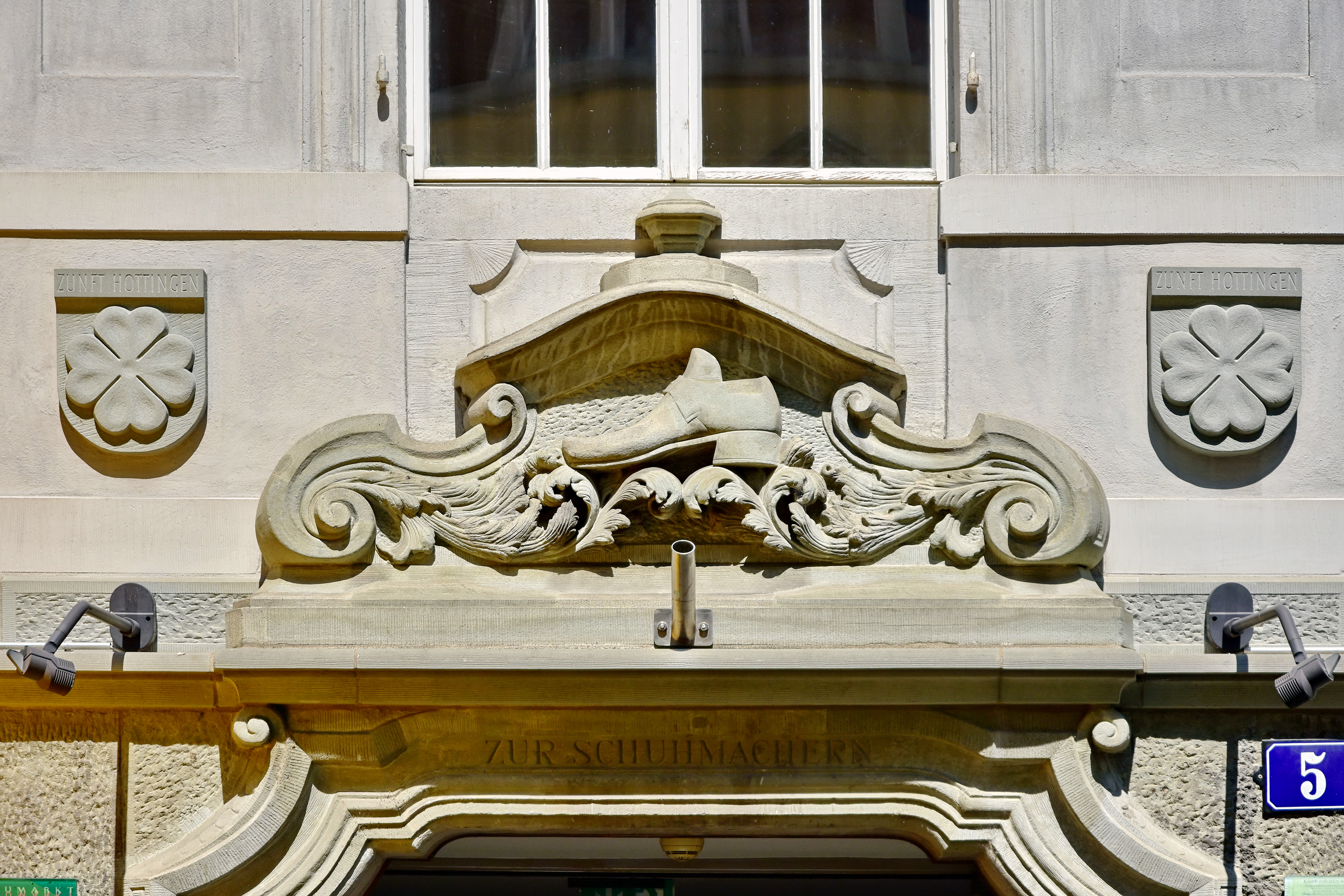
supraporta showing the insignia of the former shoemaker guild

== Program and ensemble ==
Thus, on 13 January 1965 the city theater under the direction of the administrative department of the Zürich mayor was established, but failed financially and artistically. Re-opened on 12 January 1966, presenting Havel's "The Garden Party", the Neumarkt Theater was founded in its present form. Under the direction of Felix Rellstab (1966–1971), it was established as the second theater stage in Zürich that performed contemporary plays. Among other stage actors, Mathias Gnädinger was one of the most prominent Swiss actors of the first Neumarkt ensemble, and from 1968 to 1971 Paul Bühlmann was also a member of the theater's ensemble,

=== Chor der gläubigen Bürger ===
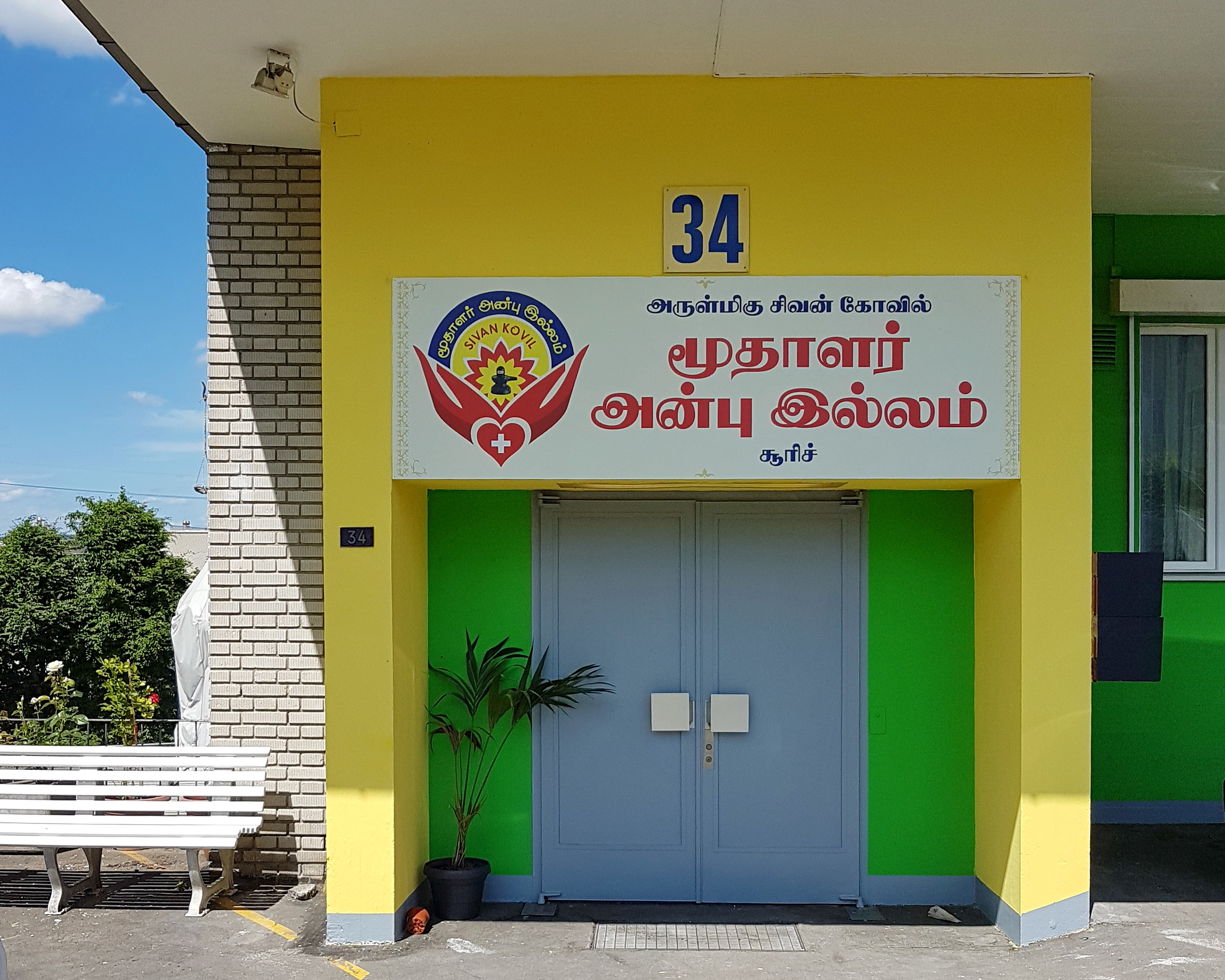
Arulmihu Sivan Temple in Glattbrugg

What do people in Zürich believe in? Which prayer rooms, which churches, mosques or temples do they visit? These were the questions at the beginning of a research project in Zürich's religious life. The Neumarkt Theatre developed the play Urban Prayers Zürich from this, which was performed in March 2018 in the midst of the altars and columns of the Glattbrugg Shiva Temple. Five actresses and actors from the Theater am Neumarkt and fifteen members from different religious communities – Muslims, Hindus, Jews, Orthodox, Free Churchers and also atheists – form the Chor der gläubigen Bürger (englisch: Choir of Believing Citizens). But they do not speak with one voice. The ensemble tries, often in vain, to find a voice. But as soon as one of them starts talking, the other one already has his say. They talk to each other with many tongues and then pass each other again.

== Facilities ==
The theatre on the two floors at Neumarkt has about 220 seats, further 40 seats at a small external stage and the crew provides also a rehearsal stage at the Werdinsel location having additional 100 seats.

The city of Zurich supports the theatre annually with 5.4 million Swiss Francs, i.e. 72% of the total expenses of the theater house are financed for over 40 years by an indefinite subsidy contract. Another 330,000 Swiss Francs are paid by the Canton of Zürich. In the context of a provocative play related to a local politician, the city council points out that the Neumarkt theater, being a theatre classed between the classical-oriented Schauspielhaus stage and the independent theatre scene, explicitly has the order to develop and promote experimental forms of theater.

== Directors ==
- Felix Rellstab, 1966–1971
- Horst Zankl, 1971–1975
- Luis Bolliger, 1975–1979
- Helmut Palitsch, 1979–1983
- Peter Schweiger, 1983–1989
- Gudrun Orsky, 1989–1993
- Volker Hesse and Stephan Müller, 1993–1999
- Crescentia Dünsser and Otto Kukla, 1999–2004
- Wolfgang Reiter, 2004–2008
- Barbara Weber and Rafael Sanchez, 2008–2013
- Peter Kastenmüller and Ralf Fiedler, 2013–2019
- Hayat Erdoğan, Tine Milz and Julia Reichert, since 2019
- Mathieu Bertholet as of the 2025/26 season

== Cultural heritage ==
The building and the adjacent Bilgeriturm are listed in the Swiss inventory of cultural property of national and regional significance as a Class B object of regional importance.

== Literature ==
- Tanja Stenzl and Andreas Kotte (publisher): Theater am Neumarkt. In: Theaterlexikon der Schweiz. Volume 3, Chronos, Zürich 2005, ISBN 3-0340-0715-9.
