= Dürnten =

- Municipality
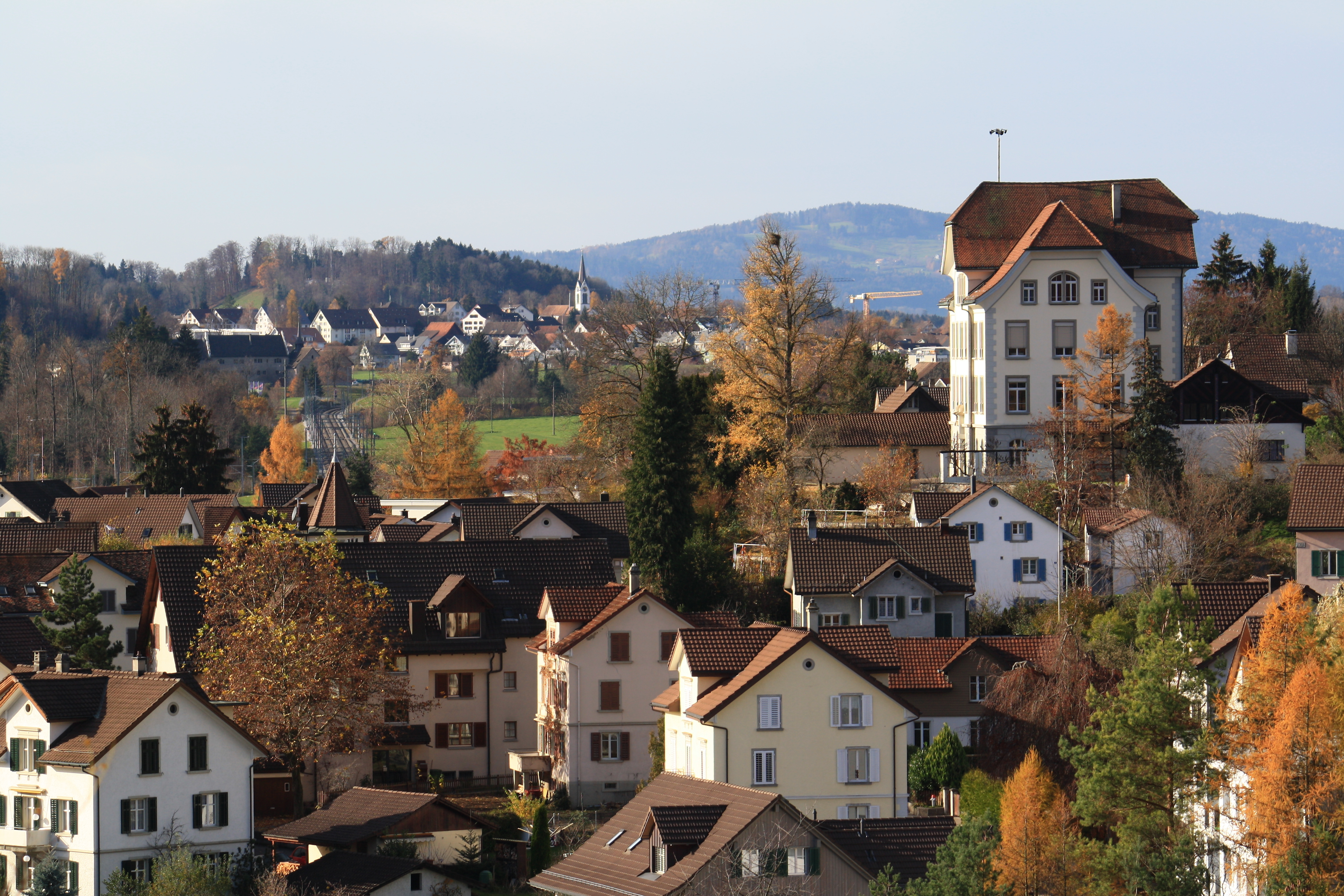

- Flag Coat of arms
- Location of Dürnten
- Location within Switzerland Location within Canton of Zürich
- Coordinates: 47°17′N 8°51′E
- Country: Switzerland
- Canton: Zürich
- District: Hinwil

Area
  - Total: 10.19 km^{2} (3.93 sq mi)
- Elevation: 511 m (1,677 ft)

Population (December 2020)
  - Total: 7,645
  - Density: 750.2/km^{2} (1,943/sq mi)
- Time zone: UTC+01:00 (CET)
  - Summer (DST): UTC+02:00 (CEST)
- Postal code: 8635
- SFOS number: 113
- ISO 3166 code: CH-ZH
- Localities: Tann, Dürnten, Oberdürnten, Breitenmatt
- Surrounded by: Bubikon, Hinwil, Rüti, Wald
- Twin towns: Szentbékkálla (Hungary)
- Website: www.duernten.ch

Dürnten is a municipality in the district of Hinwil in the canton of Zürich in Switzerland.

== History ==
Dürnten is first mentioned between 743 and 747 as Tunriude.

== Geography ==
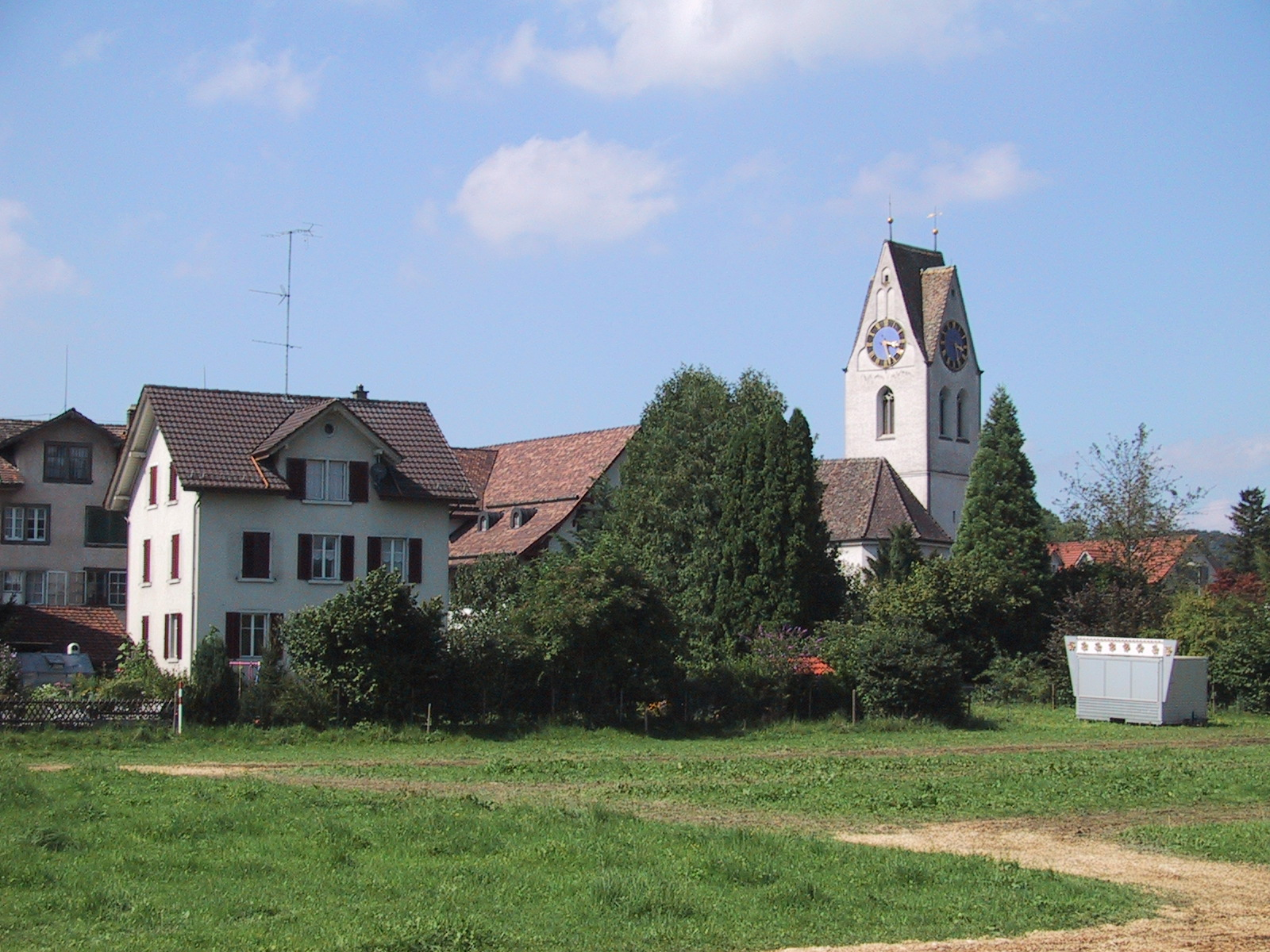
Dürnten village and church

Dürnten has an area of 10.2 km^{2} (3.9 sq mi). Of this area, 60.4% is used for agricultural purposes, while 17% is forested. Of the rest of the land, 21.4% is settled (buildings or roads) and the remainder (1.1%) is non-productive (rivers, glaciers or mountains). In 1996 housing and buildings made up 13.9% of the total area, while transportation infrastructure made up the rest (7.4%). Of the total unproductive area, water (streams and lakes) made up 0.8% of the area. As of 2007 15.4% of the total municipal area was undergoing some type of construction.

The Jona river flows through the municipality. It is located in the south-west side of Bachtel mountain. It includes the villages of Dürnten, Oberdürnten and Tann.

== Demographics ==
Dürnten has a population (as of 31 December 2020) of 7,645. As of 2007, 14.9% of the population was made up of foreign nationals. As of 2008 the gender distribution of the population was 50.2% male and 49.8% female. Over the last 10 years the population has grown at a rate of 8%. Most of the population (as of 2000) speaks German (89.3%), with Albanian being second most common ( 2.6%) and Italian being third ( 2.5%).

In the 2007 election the most popular party was the SVP which received 41.3% of the vote. The next three most popular parties were the SPS (15%), the CSP (10.4%) and the FDP (10.1%).

The age distribution of the population (as of 2000) is children and teenagers (0–19 years old) make up 25.1% of the population, while adults (20–64 years old) make up 60.8% and seniors (over 64 years old) make up 14%. The entire Swiss population is generally well educated. In Dürnten about 76.7% of the population (between age 25–64) have completed either non-mandatory upper secondary education or additional higher education (either university or a Fachhochschule). There are 2464 households in Dürnten.

Dürnten has an unemployment rate of 1.79%. As of 2005, there were 155 people employed in the primary economic sector and about 51 businesses involved in this sector. 268 people are employed in the secondary sector and there are 68 businesses in this sector. 847 people are employed in the tertiary sector, with 149 businesses in this sector. As of 2007 39.4% of the working population were employed full-time, and 60.6% were employed part-time.

As of 2008 there were 1803 Catholics and 2697 Protestants in Dürnten. In the 2000 census, religion was broken down into several smaller categories. From the 2000 census, 49.6% were some type of Protestant, with 44.3% belonging to the Swiss Reformed Church and 5.3% belonging to other Protestant churches. 28.7% of the population were Catholic. Of the rest of the population, 0% were Muslim, 7.9% belonged to another religion (not listed), 2.7% did not give a religion, and 10.8% were atheist or agnostic. The Sri Vishnu Thurkkai Amman Temple in Dürnten was inaugurated in 2010.

The historical population is given in the following table:

Demographics
year	population
1670	977
1792	1382
1850	1663
1900	3094
1941	3006
1950	3390
1990	5736
1995	5843
2000	6032
2005	6081
2010	6665
2011	7055

== International relations ==
=== Twin towns – Sister cities ===
Dürnten is twinned with:

- Szentbékkálla, Hungary – since 2001
