= Sri Sivasubramaniar Temple =

Hindu temple in Switzerland

Coordinates: 47°18′24.42″N 8°31′33.16″E

The Sri Sivasubramaniar Temple is a Hindu temple located in Adliswil in the Sihl Valley in the canton of Zürich, Sihlweg 3, 8134 Adliswil, Switzerland.

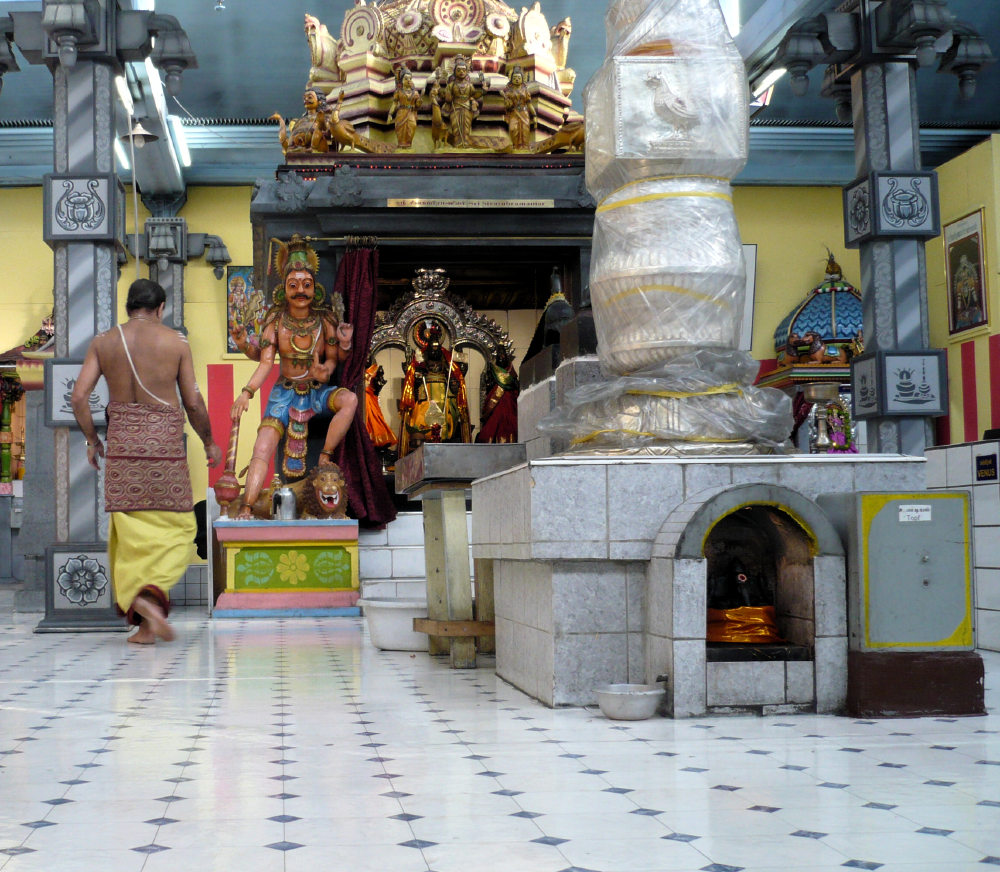
Sri Sivasubramaniar Temple

== History ==
In the 1990s, an interreligious society was established in the canton of Zürich to support the foundation of a centre for spiritual and cultural care of Tamil people in Switzerland, as well as to preserve and maintain the Tamil culture of the approximatively 30–35,000 (around 20,000 in the canton of Zürich) Tamil people of Sri Lankan origin living in Switzerland. So, the Sri Sivasubraminar Temple in Adliswil was founded in 1994 as a non-profit foundation. As of today, the Sri Sivasubramniar Temple is the most famous and largest Hindu temple in Switzerland.

== Temple's building ==
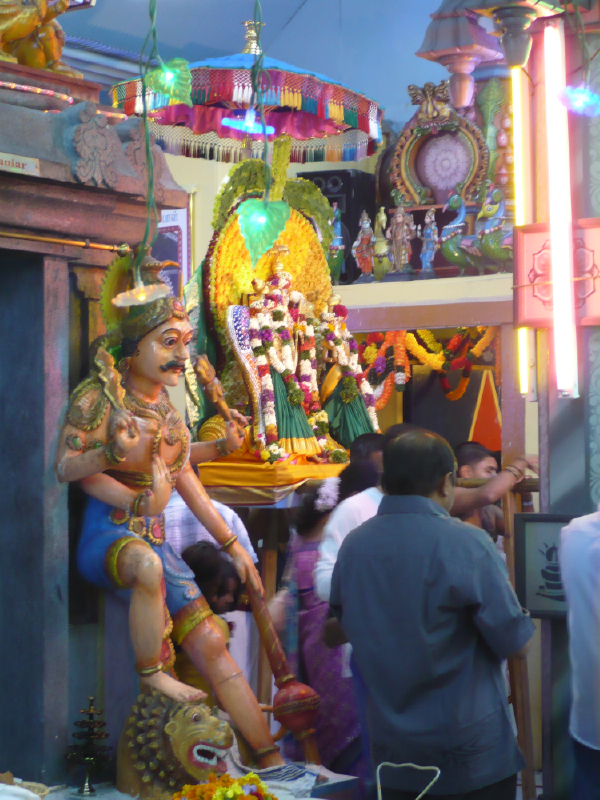

The Temple is located in a former factory building on the shores of the Sihl river in the industrial area of the municipality of Adliswil. The today's building is situated at Sihlweg 3, 8134 Adliswil.

== Cultural and religious life ==
In 1994, the Poojas of the temple were conducted only on Fridays in the evenings. In 2000, deities made of metal of Lord Shiva, Lord Murugan, Lord Maha Ganapathy and Goddesses Durka Rajarajeswary Ambal and others were installed. Thereafter the temple's Pooja ceremonies were performed daily in the evening at 7:30 pm. If there were any special requests made by anyone who is anxious to carry out a pooja for any God they like, the request would be processed on the day suggested. The cost of the pooja ceremony has to be paid to the temple before the ceremony is carried out. Now the Poojas are performed daily in the evening at 7:30 pm. On Tuesdays and on Fridays three Poojas are performed: In the morning, at 12:00 am and as mentioned at 7:30 pm. Most of the devotees attend the temple during the noon and in the evenings.

Yearly on January 1, the devotees attend the temple to worship in order to invoke the blessings of God on the 1st day of the new year. Thai Pongal is an important day for farmers; it is conducted on January 14. In the house of every Hindu family Thai Pongal is celebrated by cooking sweet milk rice which is called "pongal". The Thai Pongal ceremony is also conducted in the temple. For this purposes the temple will be opened from 8:00 am to 9:00 pm. In August, approximately 3,000 to 4,000 people take part in public procession of Lord Murugan.

Additional temple festivals are celebrated, too: Maha Shivaratri, Deepavali, Vinayaka Chathurthi, Navratri/Vijayadashami and Iyappa Swamy.

== See also ==
- Hinduism in Switzerland
- List of Hindu temples in Switzerland
