= Jean-Michel =

Jean-Michel is a French masculine given name. It may refer to:

- Jean-Michel Arnold, General Secretary of the Cinémathèque Française
- Jean-Michel Atlan (1913–1960), French artist
- Jean-Michel Aulas (born 1949), French businessman
- Jean-Michel Badiane (born 1983), French football defender of Senegalese descent
- Jean-Michel Basquiat (1960–1988), American artist
- Jean-Michel Bayle (born 1969), semi-retired French professional motorcycle racer
- Jean-Michel Baylet (born 1946), French politician, Senator, and leader of the Radical Party
- Jean-Michel Bazire (born 1971), French harness racing driver
- Jean-Michel Bellot (born 1953), French pole vaulter
- Jean-Michel Berthelot (1945–2006), French sociologist, philosopher, epistemologist and social theorist
- Jean-Michel Bertrand (1943–2008)
- Jean-Michel Beysser (1753–1794), French general
- Jean-Michel Bismut (born 1948), French mathematician
- Jean-Michel Bokamba-Yangouma, Congolese politician
- Jean-Michel Bombardier (born 1970), Canadian figure skater
- Jean-Michel Boucheron (disambiguation), several people
- Jean-Michel Byron, South African-born lead vocalist for rock band Toto
- Jean-Michel Caradec'h (1950–2022), French journalist and writer
- Jean-Michel Carré, French director of television documentaries
- Jean-Michel Cavalli (born 1957), French and Corsican licensed professional football manager
- Jean-Michel Cazes (1935–2023), French winemaker and insurance executive
- Jean-Michel Charlier (1924–1989), Belgian script writer
- Jean-Michel Chevotet (1698–1772), French architect
- Jean-Michel Clément (born 1954), member of the National Assembly of France
- Jean-Michel Coron (born 1956), French mathematician
- Jean-Michel Cousteau (born 1938), French explorer, environmentalist, educator and film producer
- Jean-Michel Couve (1940–2025), French cardiologist and politician, member of the National Assembly of France
- Jean-Michel Damase (1928–2013), French pianist, conductor and composer of classical music
- Jean-Michel Damian (1947–2016), French radio journalist
- Jean-Michel Daoust (born 1983), Canadian ice hockey player
- Jean-Michel-d'Astorg Aubarède (1639–1692), canon regular and Vicar Capitular of the diocese of Pamiers
- Jean-Michel d'Avray (born 1962), South African-born football player and manager
- Jean-Michel Defaye (1932–2025), French composer
- Jean-Michel de Lepinay, governor of the French colony of Louisiana from 1717–18
- Jean-Michel Dubernard (1941–2021), medical doctor specializing in transplant surgery
- Jean-Michel Dubois (born 1943), French politician and a member of the far-right FN
- Jean-Michel Dupuis (born 1955), French theatre, TV and film actor
- Jean-Michel Ferrand (born 1942), member of the National Assembly of France
- Jean-Michel Ferri (born 1969), French football midfielder
- Jean-Michel Ferrière (born 1959), French professional football player
- Jean-Michel Folon (1934–2005), Belgian artist, illustrator, painter and sculptor
- Jean-Michel Fourgous (born 1953), member of the National Assembly of France
- Jean-Michel Frank (1895–1941), French interior designer
- Jean-Michel Frodon (born 1953), French journalist, critic and historian of cinema
- Jean-Michel Gaillard (1946–2005), high-ranking French official
- Jean-Michel Gatete
- Jean-Michel Gonzalez (born 1967), French rugby union player
- Jean-Michel Goudard (1939–2020), French advertising man
- Jean-Michel Guilcher (1914–2017), French ethnologist
- Jean-Michel Huon de Kermadec (1748–1792), 18th-century Breton navigator
- Jean-Michel Iribarren (born 1958), French author
- Jean Michel Jarre (born 1948), French composer, performer and music producer
- Jean-Michel Labadie, member of the band Gojira
- Jean-Michel Larqué (born 1947), French former football player and now a journalist
- Jean-Michel Lesage (born 1977), French football player
- Jean-Michel Liade Gnonka (born 1980), Burkinabé football player
- Jean-Michel Macron (born 1950), French professor of neurology
- Jean-Michel Maulpoix (born 1952), French author
- Jean-Michel Ménard
- Jean-Michel Mension (1934–2006), French radical active in the Lettrist International
- Jean-Michel Moutier (born 1955), French football player
- Jean-Michel Moreau (1741–1814), French draughtsman and illustrator
- Jean-Michel Othoniel (born 1964), contemporary artist
- Jean-Michel Pequery (born 1978), French retired professional tennis player
- Jean-Michel Pilc (born 1960), self-taught French-born jazz pianist
- Jean-Michel Reginer, French slalom canoer
- Jean-Michel Ribes (born 1946), French actor, playwright, screenwriter, theatre director and film maker
- Jean Michel Claude Richard (1787–1868), French botanist and plant collector
- Jean-Michel Rouzière (-1989), French comic actor and theatre head
- Jean-Michel Saive (born 1969), Belgian professional table tennis player
- Jean-Michel Savéant (1933–2020), French chemist specialized in electrochemistry
- Jean-Michel Severino, managing director of France's international development agency
- Jean-Michel Sigere (born 1977), French football striker
- Jean-Michel Simonella (born 1962), French professional football player
- Jean-Michel Soupraya (born 1973), French music conductor, record producer, musical arranger and film composer
- Jean-Michel Tchouga (born 1978), football player from Cameroon
- Jean-Michel Thierry, French doctor and art historian
- Jean-Michel Tobie, mayor of the city of Ancenis in Loire-Atlantique, France
- Jean-Michel Villaumé (born 1946), member of the National Assembly of France
- Jean-Michel Wilmotte (born 1948), French architect and designer

and also :

- Jean-Michel and his team, controversial Evangelical-oriented new religious movement founded in 1975
- Jean Michel (poet) (died 1501), 15th-century French dramatic poet
- Jean Michel (politician) (born 1949), French politician
- Jean-Michel Irankunda (born 2005), Rwandan mechanical, electronic engineering enthusiast and innovator and a Computer Generated Imagery(CGI) artist.
