= Boucheron (surname) =

Boucheron is a French surname. Notable people with the surname include:

- Angelo Boucheron (c. 1780 – 1859), Italian painter and engraver
- Brigitte Boucheron
- Hugo Boucheron (born 1993), French rower
- Jean-Michel Boucheron (disambiguation), multiple people
- Maxime Boucheron (1846–1896), French playwright and chansonnier
- Michel Boucheron (1903–1940), French rugby union player and coach
- Onésime Boucheron (1904–1996), French cyclist
- Patrick Boucheron (born 1965), French historian
- Raimondo Boucheron (1800–1876), Italian composer

== See also ==
- Bernard du Boucheron
