= Boucheron (disambiguation) =

Boucheron may refer to:

- Boucheron, a French jewelry company
- Boucheron (horse), an American Saddlebred show horse
- Boucheron (surname), a French last name
