= Jean-Michel and his team =

- Jean-Michel et son équipe
- Classification: Evangelism
- Region: Europe, U.S.
- Founder: Jean-Michel Cravanzola
- Origin: 1972; Switzerland
- Defunct: 1992
- Members: 300

The Jean-Michel and his team association was a controversial Evangelical-oriented new religious movement founded in 1972 in the Vaud canton, in Switzerland, by Jean-Michel Cravanzola. It was later re-named "Communauté Chrétienne Internationale" (in the late 1980s).

== History and organization ==
Presented as being charismatic, Cravanzola was born in Oran, Algeria, in 1945. He became evangelist in Lausanne and, after two dreams with alleged divine origin, decided to found a hierarchic and patriarchal community in Essertines-sur-Yverdon to help poor people, drug addicts, and convert them. Life in the community was devoted to prayer and work. Followers had to sell 30 books per day.

They had some commercial production activities in Ticino canton. After a suspicious conviction for fraud in charity, the founder went to Florida. In 1992, the company cut Cravanzola's authority and the group ended. There were about 300 believers in Europe and U.S.

== Controversies ==
The community was criticized by some former |members and Swiss anti-cult association ASDFI whose founder, Paul Ranc, started to warn the population against the group in 1979. Criticisms included exaggerated focus on donations (voluntary work and double tithe), psychological pressures exerted by Cravanzola, excessive control of life and difficulties to leave the community. In Switzerland, media widely gave negative reports about the community and contributed to raise mistrust towards new religious movements, but French association for the defense of religious freedom CICNS criticized this point of view.
