= Rueyres, Switzerland =

Rueyres
- Municipality
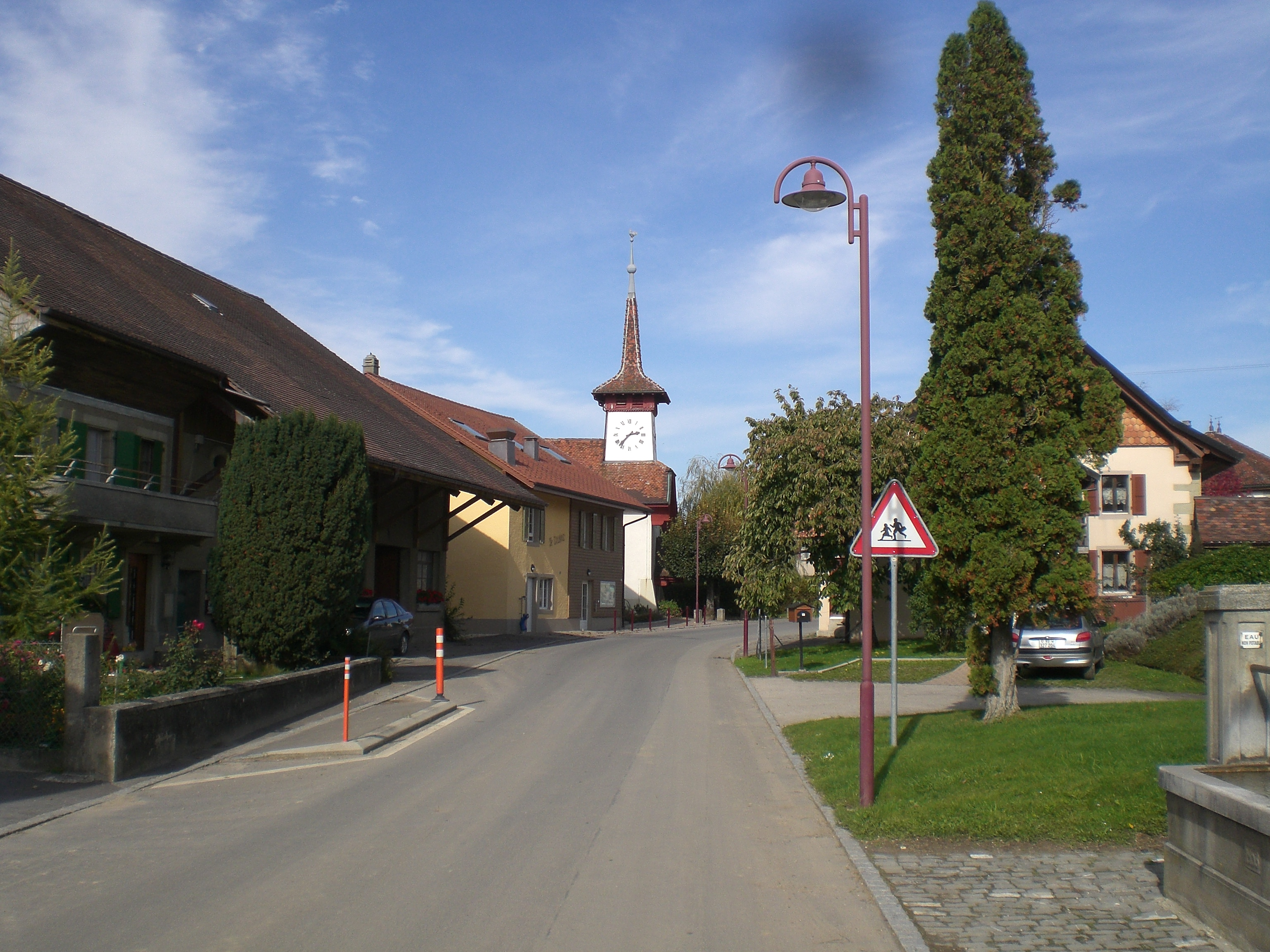

- Flag Coat of arms
- Location of Rueyres
- Location within Switzerland Location within Canton of Vaud
- Coordinates: 46°42′N 6°42′E
- Country: Switzerland
- Canton: Vaud
- District: Gros-de-Vaud

Government
  - Mayor: Syndic

Area
  - Total: 2.02 km^{2} (0.78 sq mi)
- Elevation: 619 m (2,031 ft)

Population (December 2004)
  - Total: 212
  - Density: 105/km^{2} (272/sq mi)
- Time zone: UTC+01:00 (CET)
  - Summer (DST): UTC+02:00 (CEST)
- Postal code: 1046
- SFOS number: 5534
- ISO 3166 code: CH-VD
- Surrounded by: Bercher, Fey, Oppens, Pailly
- Website: rueyres.ch

Rueyres is a municipality in the district of Gros-de-Vaud in the canton of Vaud in Switzerland.

== History ==
Rueyres is first mentioned in 1177 as Rueria.

== Geography ==
Rueyres has an area, as of 2009, of 2.02 square kilometres (0.78 sq mi). Of this area, 1.4 km^{2} (0.54 sq mi) or 69.3% is used for agricultural purposes, while 0.36 km^{2} (0.14 sq mi) or 17.8% is forested. Of the rest of the land, 0.22 km^{2} (0.085 sq mi) or 10.9% is settled (buildings or roads).

Of the built up area, industrial buildings made up 2.0% of the total area while housing and buildings made up 5.4% and transportation infrastructure made up 3.5%. Out of the forested land, all of the forested land area is covered with heavy forests. Of the agricultural land, 48.5% is used for growing crops and 19.8% is pastures.

The municipality was part of the Echallens District until it was dissolved on 31 August 2006, and Rueyres became part of the new district of Gros-de-Vaud.

=== Climate ===
Climate in this area has mild differences between highs and lows, and there is adequate rainfall year-round. The Köppen Climate Classification subtype for this climate is "Cfb". (Marine West Coast Climate/Oceanic climate).

Climate data for Rueyres, Switzerland
| Month | Jan | Feb | Mar | Apr | May | Jun | Jul | Aug | Sep | Oct | Nov | Dec | Year |
|---|---|---|---|---|---|---|---|---|---|---|---|---|---|
| Mean daily maximum °C (°F) | 2.6 (36.7) | 5.2 (41.4) | 9.3 (48.7) | 13.7 (56.7) | 18 (64) | 21.3 (70.3) | 23.6 (74.5) | 22.6 (72.7) | 19.5 (67.1) | 14.5 (58.1) | 7.5 (45.5) | 3.5 (38.3) | 13.4 (56.1) |
| Daily mean °C (°F) | 0 (32) | 1.5 (34.7) | 4.4 (39.9) | 8.2 (46.8) | 12.7 (54.9) | 16 (61) | 18.3 (64.9) | 17.2 (63.0) | 14.3 (57.7) | 9.9 (49.8) | 4.4 (39.9) | 1 (34) | 9 (48) |
| Mean daily minimum °C (°F) | −2.6 (27.3) | −1.4 (29.5) | 0.9 (33.6) | 4 (39) | 8 (46) | 11.2 (52.2) | 13.2 (55.8) | 12.9 (55.2) | 10.6 (51.1) | 6.9 (44.4) | 1.9 (35.4) | −1.4 (29.5) | 5.4 (41.7) |
| Average precipitation mm (inches) | 46 (1.8) | 43 (1.7) | 40 (1.6) | 35 (1.4) | 41 (1.6) | 50 (2.0) | 46 (1.8) | 53 (2.1) | 36 (1.4) | 46 (1.8) | 53 (2.1) | 52 (2.0) | 542 (21.3) |
| Average precipitation days | 6.9 | 6 | 6.5 | 6 | 7.4 | 7.6 | 8 | 7.9 | 5.6 | 5.7 | 6.7 | 7.1 | 81.4 |
Source: MeteoSchweiz

== Coat of arms ==
The blazon of the municipal coat of arms is Gules, around a Bar Or with three Oak-leaves Vert, three Annulets of the second, two and one.

== Demographics ==
Rueyres has a population (as of December 2020) of 266. As of 2008, 8.8% of the population are resident foreign nationals. Over the last 10 years (1999–2009 ) the population has changed at a rate of 26.1%. It has changed at a rate of 14.7% due to migration and at a rate of 12% due to births and deaths.

Most of the population (as of 2000) speaks French (183 or 93.8%), with German being second most common (9 or 4.6%) and Portuguese being third (2 or 1.0%).

Of the population in the village 66 or about 33.8% were born in Rueyres and lived there in 2000. There were 92 or 47.2% who were born in the same canton, while 21 or 10.8% were born somewhere else in Switzerland, and 13 or 6.7% were born outside of Switzerland.

In 2008, there were 4 live births to Swiss citizens and 1 death of a Swiss citizen. Ignoring immigration and emigration, the population of Swiss citizens increased by 3 while the foreign population remained the same. At the same time, there was 1 non-Swiss man and 1 non-Swiss woman who immigrated from another country to Switzerland. The total Swiss population change in 2008 (from all sources, including moves across municipal borders) was an increase of 8 and the non-Swiss population decreased by 3 people. This represents a population growth rate of 2.1%.

The age distribution, as of 2009, in Rueyres is; 40 children or 17.2% of the population are between 0 and 9 years old and 23 teenagers or 9.9% are between 10 and 19. Of the adult population, 31 people or 13.4% of the population are between 20 and 29 years old. 42 people or 18.1% are between 30 and 39, 28 people or 12.1% are between 40 and 49, and 27 people or 11.6% are between 50 and 59. The senior population distribution is 22 people or 9.5% of the population are between 60 and 69 years old, 14 people or 6.0% are between 70 and 79, there are 4 people or 1.7% who are between 80 and 89, and there is 1 person who is 90 and older.

As of 2000, there were 73 people who were single and never married in the village. There were 105 married individuals, 11 widows or widowers and 6 individuals who are divorced.

As of 2000, there were 77 private households in the village, and an average of 2.5 persons per household. There were 20 households that consist of only one person and 6 households with five or more people. Out of a total of 78 households that answered this question, 25.6% were households made up of just one person. Of the rest of the households, there are 20 married couples without children, 31 married couples with children There were 3 single parents with a child or children. There were 3 households that were made up of unrelated people and 1 household that was made up of some sort of institution or another collective housing.

In 2000, there were 28 single family homes (or 53.8% of the total) out of a total of 52 inhabited buildings. There were 12 multi-family buildings (23.1%) and along with 12 multi-purpose buildings that were mostly used for housing (23.1%). Of the single family homes 15 were built before 1919, while 7 were built between 1990 and 2000. The most multi-family homes (9) were built before 1919 and the next most (1) were built between 1919 and 1945. There was 1 multi-family house built between 1996 and 2000.

In 2000, there were 80 apartments in the village. The most common apartment size was 4 rooms of which there were 19. There were 2 single room apartments and 33 apartments with five or more rooms. Of these apartments, a total of 77 apartments (96.3% of the total) were permanently occupied, while 1 apartment was seasonally occupied and 2 apartments (2.5%) were empty. As of 2009, the construction rate of new housing units was 8.6 new units per 1000 residents. The vacancy rate for the village, in 2010, was 0%.

The historical population is given in the following chart:

== Politics ==
In the 2007 federal election the most popular party was the SVP which received 29.94% of the vote. The next three most popular parties were the FDP (20.92%), the SP (16.69%) and the Green Party (10.89%). In the federal election, a total of 74 votes were cast, and the voter turnout was 49.7%.

== Economy ==
As of 2010, Rueyres had an unemployment rate of 5.9%. As of 2008, there were 19 people employed in the primary economic sector and about 9 businesses involved in this sector. 37 people were employed in the secondary sector and there were 3 businesses in this sector. 10 people were employed in the tertiary sector, with 4 businesses in this sector. There were 105 residents of the village who were employed in some capacity, of which females made up 47.6% of the workforce.

In 2008 the total number of full-time equivalent jobs was 58. The number of jobs in the primary sector was 15, all of which were in agriculture. The number of jobs in the secondary sector was 35 of which 34 or (97.1%) were in manufacturing and 1 was in construction. The number of jobs in the tertiary sector was 8, of which 1 was a technical professional or scientist.

In 2000, there were 14 workers who commuted into the village and 70 workers who commuted away. The village is a net exporter of workers, with about 5.0 workers leaving the village for every one entering. Of the working population, 12.4% used public transportation to get to work, and 58.1% used a private car.

== Religion ==
From the 2000 census, 19 or 9.7% were Roman Catholic, while 139 or 71.3% belonged to the Swiss Reformed Church. Of the rest of the population, there were 4 individuals (or about 2.05% of the population) who belonged to another Christian church. 32 (or about 16.41% of the population) belonged to no church, are agnostic or atheist, and 3 individuals (or about 1.54% of the population) did not answer the question.

== Education ==
In Rueyres about 74 or (37.9%) of the population have completed non-mandatory upper secondary education, and 30 or (15.4%) have completed additional higher education (either university or a Fachhochschule). Of the 30 who completed tertiary schooling, 56.7% were Swiss men, 33.3% were Swiss women.

In the 2009/2010 school year there were a total of 33 students in the Rueyres school district. In the Vaud cantonal school system, two years of non-obligatory pre-school are provided by the political districts. During the school year, the political district provided pre-school care for a total of 296 children of which 96 children (32.4%) received subsidized pre-school care. The canton's primary school program requires students to attend for four years. There were 22 students in the municipal primary school program. The obligatory lower secondary school program lasts for six years and there were 10 students in those schools. There were also 1 students who were home schooled or attended another non-traditional school.

As of 2000, there were 5 students in Rueyres who came from another village, while 28 residents attended schools outside the village.
