= Orzens =

- Municipality
- Flag Coat of arms
- Location of Orzens
- Location within Switzerland Location within Canton of Vaud
- Coordinates: 46°43′N 6°41′E
- Country: Switzerland
- Canton: Vaud
- District: Jura-Nord Vaudois

Government
  - Mayor: Syndic

Area
  - Total: 4.19 km^{2} (1.62 sq mi)
- Elevation: 622 m (2,041 ft)

Population (2003)
  - Total: 207
  - Density: 49.4/km^{2} (128/sq mi)
- Time zone: UTC+01:00 (CET)
  - Summer (DST): UTC+02:00 (CEST)
- Postal code: 1413
- SFOS number: 5925
- ISO 3166 code: CH-VD
- Surrounded by: Bioley-Magnoux, Cronay, Essertines-sur-Yverdon, Gossens, Oppens, Pailly, Ursins
- Website: http://www.orzens.ch Profile (in French), SFSO statistics

Orzens is a municipality in the district of Jura-Nord Vaudois in the canton of Vaud in Switzerland.

== History ==
Orzens is first mentioned in 1177 as Orsens.

== Geography ==
Orzens has an area, as of 2009, of 4.2 square kilometers (1.6 mi^{2}). Of this area, 3.34 km^{2} (1.29 mi^{2}) or 79.5% is used for agricultural purposes, while 0.66 km^{2} (0.25 mi^{2}) or 15.7% is forested. Of the rest of the land, 0.2 km^{2} (0.077 mi^{2}) or 4.8% is settled (buildings or roads).

Of the built up area, housing and buildings made up 3.1% and transportation infrastructure made up 1.7%. Out of the forested land, all of the forested land area is covered with heavy forests. Of the agricultural land, 63.6% is used for growing crops and 15.0% is pastures.

The municipality was part of the Yverdon District until it was dissolved on 31 August 2006, and Orzens became part of the new district of Jura-Nord Vaudois.

The municipality is located in the wooded hills above the left bank of the Mentue. It consists of the village of Orzens and the hamlet of Champs Plats.

== Coat of arms ==
The blazon of the municipal coat of arms is Argent, a Saltire Gules, overall a Mullet of Six of the first fimbriated Sable.

== Demographics ==
Orzens has a population (as of December 2020) of 201. As of 2008, 5.4% of the population are resident foreign nationals. Over the last 10 years (1999–2009 ) the population has changed at a rate of -2.4%. It has changed at a rate of -3.4% due to migration and at a rate of 2% due to births and deaths.

Most of the population (as of 2000) speaks French (189 or 95.9%) as their first language, with German being second most common (3 or 1.5%) and English being third (2 or 1.0%).

The age distribution, as of 2009, in Orzens is; 13 children or 6.5% of the population are between 0 and 9 years old and 23 teenagers or 11.5% are between 10 and 19. Of the adult population, 29 people or 14.5% of the population are between 20 and 29 years old. 28 people or 14.0% are between 30 and 39, 34 people or 17.0% are between 40 and 49, and 25 people or 12.5% are between 50 and 59. The senior population distribution is 16 people or 8.0% of the population are between 60 and 69 years old, 17 people or 8.5% are between 70 and 79, there are 15 people or 7.5% who are between 80 and 89.

As of 2000, there were 81 people who were single and never married in the municipality. There were 97 married individuals, 12 widows or widowers and 7 individuals who are divorced.

As of 2000, there were 82 private households in the municipality, and an average of 2.4 persons per household. There were 26 households that consist of only one person and 9 households with five or more people. Out of a total of 83 households that answered this question, 31.3% were households made up of just one person and there was 1 adult who lived with their parents. Of the rest of the households, there are 23 married couples without children, 26 married couples with children There were 2 single parents with a child or children. There were 4 households that were made up of unrelated people and 1 household that was made up of some sort of institution or another collective housing.

In 2000 there were 34 single family homes (or 54.8% of the total) out of a total of 62 inhabited buildings. There were 9 multi-family buildings (14.5%), along with 17 multi-purpose buildings that were mostly used for housing (27.4%) and 2 other use buildings (commercial or industrial) that also had some housing (3.2%).

In 2000, a total of 76 apartments (88.4% of the total) were permanently occupied, while 5 apartments (5.8%) were seasonally occupied and 5 apartments (5.8%) were empty. As of 2009, the construction rate of new housing units was 0 new units per 1000 residents. The vacancy rate for the municipality, in 2010, was 1.14%.

The historical population is given in the following chart:

== Politics ==
In the 2007 federal election the most popular party was the SVP which received 47.97% of the vote. The next three most popular parties were the Green Party (16.31%), the SP (11.77%) and the FDP (7.78%). In the federal election, a total of 87 votes were cast, and the voter turnout was 57.2%.

== Economy ==
As of 2010, Orzens had an unemployment rate of 2.6%. As of 2008, there were 20 people employed in the primary economic sector and about 9 businesses involved in this sector. 14 people were employed in the secondary sector and there were 3 businesses in this sector. 4 people were employed in the tertiary sector, with 3 businesses in this sector. There were 81 residents of the municipality who were employed in some capacity, of which females made up 39.5% of the workforce.

In 2008 the total number of full-time equivalent jobs was 28. The number of jobs in the primary sector was 12, all of which were in agriculture. The number of jobs in the secondary sector was 13 of which 1 was in manufacturing and 12 (92.3%) were in construction. The number of jobs in the tertiary sector was 3. In the tertiary sector; 1 was in the sale or repair of motor vehicles, 1 was in education.

In 2000, there were 15 workers who commuted into the municipality and 56 workers who commuted away. The municipality is a net exporter of workers, with about 3.7 workers leaving the municipality for every one entering. Of the working population, 0% used public transportation to get to work, and 72.8% used a private car.

== Religion ==
From the 2000 census, 17 or 8.6% were Roman Catholic, while 138 or 70.1% belonged to the Swiss Reformed Church. Of the rest of the population, there were 35 individuals (or about 17.77% of the population) who belonged to another Christian church. 23 (or about 11.68% of the population) belonged to no church, are agnostic or atheist, and 1 individuals (or about 0.51% of the population) did not answer the question.

== Weather ==
Orzens has an average of 123.8 days of rain or snow per year and on average receives 999 mm (39.3 in) of precipitation. The wettest month is June during which time Orzens receives an average of 99 mm (3.9 in) of rain or snow. During this month there is precipitation for an average of 11.4 days. The month with the most days of precipitation is May, with an average of 12.3, but with only 94 mm (3.7 in) of rain or snow. The driest month of the year is February with an average of 70 mm (2.8 in) of precipitation over 10.3 days.

== Education ==
In Orzens about 66 or (33.5%) of the population have completed non-mandatory upper secondary education, and 19 or (9.6%) have completed additional higher education (either university or a Fachhochschule). Of the 19 who completed tertiary schooling, 78.9% were Swiss men, 15.8% were Swiss women.

In the 2009/2010 school year there were a total of 17 students in the Orzens school district. In the Vaud cantonal school system, two years of non-obligatory pre-school are provided by the political districts. During the school year, the political district provided pre-school care for a total of 578 children of which 359 children (62.1%) received subsidized pre-school care. The canton's primary school program requires students to attend for four years. There were 9 students in the municipal primary school program. The obligatory lower secondary school program lasts for six years and there were 8 students in those schools.

As of 2000, there were 9 students in Orzens who came from another municipality, while 30 residents attended schools outside the municipality.

== Sport ==
Stage three of the 2024 Tour de Suisse Women passed through Orzens on Monday 17th June.
