= Bercher =

- Municipality
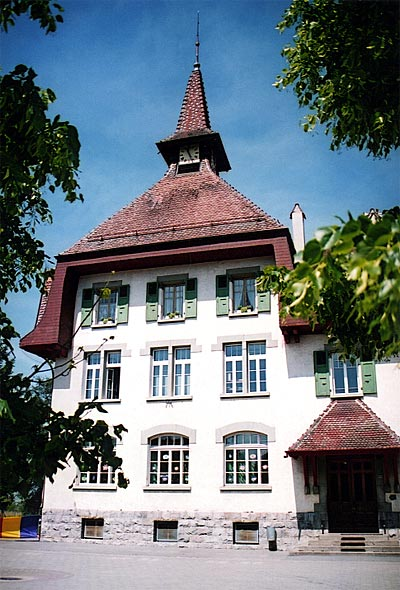
- Bercher village school

- Flag Coat of arms
- Location of Bercher
- Location within Switzerland Location within Canton of Vaud
- Coordinates: 46°41′31.64″N 6°42′30.53″E
- Country: Switzerland
- Canton: Vaud
- District: Gros-de-Vaud

Government
  - Mayor: Syndic

Area
  - Total: 4.25 km^{2} (1.64 sq mi)
- Elevation: 637 m (2,090 ft)

Population (December 2004)
  - Total: 923
  - Density: 217/km^{2} (562/sq mi)
- Time zone: UTC+01:00 (CET)
  - Summer (DST): UTC+02:00 (CEST)
- Postal code: 1038
- SFOS number: 5512
- ISO 3166 code: CH-VD
- Surrounded by: Boulens, Fey, Ogens, Oppens, Rueyres, Saint-Cierges
- Website: www.bercher-vd.ch

Bercher is a village and municipality in the district of Gros-de-Vaud in the canton of Vaud in Switzerland.

== History ==
Bercher is first mentioned in 1154 as de Berchiaco, but the site was already occupied by the Helvetii, the Romans, and the Burgundians. It was strategically positioned above the steep-sided valley of the Menthue river, and a castle was sited on a rocky spur to the east of the village; a site still known as Château-Vieux.

The old castle was demolished between 1658 and 1732, and the current castle, to the north of the village, was built at the end of the 17th century. The church, built near the later castle and some 600 metres (2,000 ft) from the village centre, dates from 1724.

In 1880, Nestlé built a condensed milk plant, using water from the Menthue river and employing approximately 150 workers. Largely because of this plant, the Compagnie du Central Vaudois opened their railway line from Échallens to Bercher in 1889. An aerial cableway transported milk and goods between the station and the plant, a distance of nearly 1 kilometre (0.62 mi).

In 1921, the abrupt closure of the Nestle plant dealt a blow to the village, with a sharp decline in its population. The railway, which had become part of the Chemin de fer Lausanne-Échallens-Bercher company in 1913, was also badly affected.

Until 1960, the municipality was part of the district of Moudon, but it was then transferred to the district of Echallens. When that district was dissolved on 31 August 2006, it became part of the new district of Gros-de-Vaud.

== Geography ==
Aerial view (1963) with the station in the foreground, church in the top left, and valley of the Menthue picked out by trees

Bercher is located on the Gros-de-Vaud plateau, about 8 kilometres (5.0 mi) north-east of Échallens. Lausanne is some 20 kilometres (12 mi) to the south, and Yverdon-les-Bains is 11 kilometres (6.8 mi) to the north-west. Bercher overlooks the steep-sided valley of the Menthue river, which lies to the east of the village centre.

The municipality has an area, as of 2009, of 4.25 square kilometers (1.64 sq mi). Of this area, 2.41 km^{2} (0.93 sq mi) or 56.7% is used for agricultural purposes, while 1.12 km^{2} (0.43 sq mi) or 26.4% is forested. Of the rest of the land, 0.69 km^{2} (0.27 sq mi) or 16.2% is settled (buildings or roads), 0.02 km^{2} (4.9 acres) or 0.5% is either rivers or lakes.

Of the built up area, industrial buildings made up 1.2% of the total area while housing and buildings made up 8.7% and transportation infrastructure made up 5.2%. Out of the forested land, 24.5% of the total land area is heavily forested and 1.9% is covered with orchards or small clusters of trees. Of the agricultural land, 46.8% is used for growing crops and 9.2% is pastures. All the water in the municipality is flowing water.

== Government ==
=== Politics ===
In the 2007 federal election the most popular party was the SP which received 24.63% of the vote. The next three most popular parties were the SVP (22.1%), the Green Party (14.18%) and the FDP (13.49%). In the federal election, a total of 303 votes were cast, and the voter turnout was 44.6%.

=== Coat of arms ===
The blazon of the municipal coat of arms is Gules, on a fess between three annulets Or a feathered hat gules.

== Demographics ==
Bercher has a population (as of December 2020) of 1,322. As of 2008, 15.2% of the population are resident foreign nationals. Over the last 10 years (1999–2009 ) the population has changed at a rate of 30%. It has changed at a rate of 26.2% due to migration and at a rate of 4.5% due to births and deaths.

Most of the population (as of 2000) speaks French (809 or 92.1%), with German being second most common (30 or 3.4%) and Portuguese being third (12 or 1.4%). There are 8 people who speak Italian.

Of the population in the municipality 220 or about 25.1% were born in Bercher and lived there in 2000. There were 389 or 44.3% who were born in the same canton, while 127 or 14.5% were born somewhere else in Switzerland, and 131 or 14.9% were born outside of Switzerland.

In 2008 there were 7 live births to Swiss citizens and 3 births to non-Swiss citizens, and in same time span there were 6 deaths of Swiss citizens. Ignoring immigration and emigration, the population of Swiss citizens increased by 1 while the foreign population increased by 3. At the same time, there were 3 non-Swiss men and 6 non-Swiss women who immigrated from another country to Switzerland. The total Swiss population change in 2008 (from all sources, including moves across municipal borders) was an increase of 11 and the non-Swiss population increased by 5 people. This represents a population growth rate of 1.5%.

The age distribution, as of 2009, in Bercher is; 140 children or 12.6% of the population are between 0 and 9 years old and 167 teenagers or 15.1% are between 10 and 19. Of the adult population, 120 people or 10.8% of the population are between 20 and 29 years old. 140 people or 12.6% are between 30 and 39, 207 people or 18.7% are between 40 and 49, and 136 people or 12.3% are between 50 and 59. The senior population distribution is 111 people or 10.0% of the population are between 60 and 69 years old, 55 people or 5.0% are between 70 and 79, there are 25 people or 2.3% who are between 80 and 89, and there are 7 people or 0.6% who are 90 and older.

As of 2000, there were 361 people who were single and never married in the municipality. There were 413 married individuals, 59 widows or widowers and 45 individuals who are divorced.

As of 2000, there were 342 private households in the municipality, and an average of 2.5 persons per household. There were 96 households that consist of only one person and 28 households with five or more people. Out of a total of 349 households that answered this question, 27.5% were households made up of just one person and there was 1 adult who lived with their parents. Of the rest of the households, there are 98 married couples without children, 126 married couples with children. There were 15 single parents with a child or children. There were 6 households that were made up of unrelated people and 7 households that were made up of some sort of institution or another collective housing.

In 2000 there were 149 single family homes (or 63.4% of the total) out of a total of 235 inhabited buildings. There were 50 multi-family buildings (21.3%), along with 27 multi-purpose buildings that were mostly used for housing (11.5%) and 9 other use buildings (commercial or industrial) that also had some housing (3.8%). Of the single family homes 38 were built before 1919, while 17 were built between 1990 and 2000. The greatest number of single family homes (41) were built between 1981 and 1990. The most multi-family homes (20) were built before 1919 and the next most (8) were built between 1961 and 1970. There were 2 multi-family houses built between 1996 and 2000.

In 2000 there were 366 apartments in the municipality. The most common apartment size was 4 rooms of which there were 114. There were 9 single room apartments and 130 apartments with five or more rooms. Of these apartments, a total of 340 apartments (92.9% of the total) were permanently occupied, while 18 apartments (4.9%) were seasonally occupied and 8 apartments (2.2%) were empty. As of 2009, the construction rate of new housing units was 0 new units per 1000 residents. The vacancy rate for the municipality, in 2010, was 0.92%.

The historical population is given in the following chart:

== Economy ==
As of 2010, Bercher had an unemployment rate of 3.8%. As of 2008, there were 19 people employed in the primary economic sector and about 8 businesses involved in this sector. 31 people were employed in the secondary sector and there were 9 businesses in this sector. 210 people were employed in the tertiary sector, with 33 businesses in this sector. There were 426 residents of the municipality who were employed in some capacity, of which females made up 41.1% of the workforce.

In 2008 the total number of full-time equivalent jobs was 211. The number of jobs in the primary sector was 12, all of which were in agriculture. The number of jobs in the secondary sector was 28 of which 14 or (50.0%) were in manufacturing and 14 (50.0%) were in construction. The number of jobs in the tertiary sector was 171. In the tertiary sector; 56 or 32.7% were in wholesale or retail sales or the repair of motor vehicles, 60 or 35.1% were in the movement and storage of goods, 8 or 4.7% were in a hotel or restaurant, 6 or 3.5% were the insurance or financial industry, 6 or 3.5% were technical professionals or scientists, 5 or 2.9% were in education and 20 or 11.7% were in health care.

In 2000, there were 137 workers who commuted into the municipality and 309 workers who commuted away. The municipality is a net exporter of workers, with about 2.3 workers leaving the municipality for every one entering. Of the working population, 13.8% used public transportation to get to work, and 66.4% used a private car.

== Transport ==
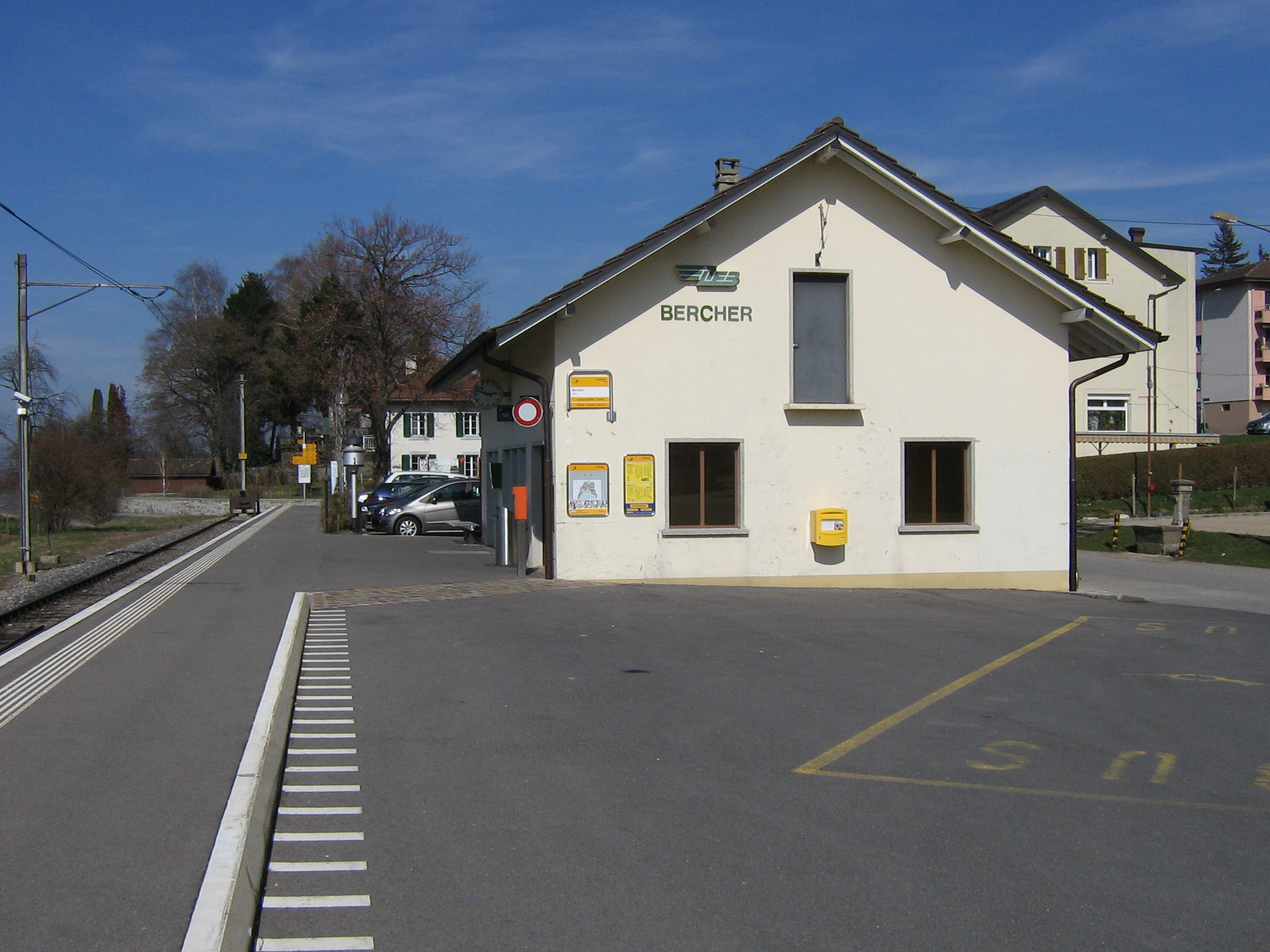
Bercher station in 2011

=== Railway ===
The municipality has a railway station, Bercher, which is the outer terminus of the suburban Lausanne-Échallens-Bercher line. There is a half-hourly interval service betweeb Bercher and Lausanne via Échallens.

=== Road ===
Bercher is connected to Échallens and other surrounding communities by secondary roads. PostBus routes connect it to Yverdon-les-Bains, Thierrens and Cronay.

== Religion ==
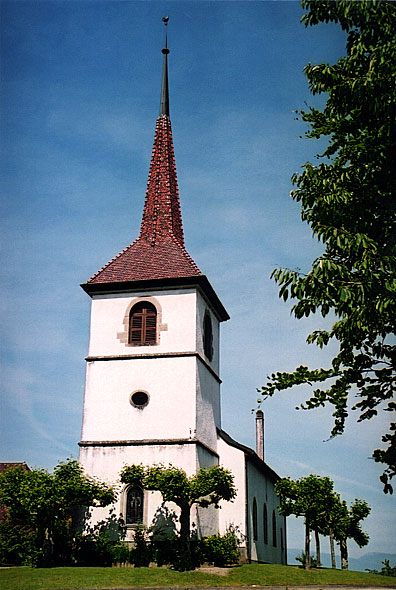
Church in Bercher

From the 2000 census, 182 or 20.7% were Roman Catholic, while 541 or 61.6% belonged to the Swiss Reformed Church. Of the rest of the population, there were 7 members of an Orthodox church (or about 0.80% of the population), and there were 28 individuals (or about 3.19% of the population) who belonged to another Christian church. There were 12 (or about 1.37% of the population) who were Islamic. There was 1 person who was Hindu and 2 individuals who belonged to another church. 103 (or about 11.73% of the population) belonged to no church, are agnostic or atheist, and 16 individuals (or about 1.82% of the population) did not answer the question.

== Education ==
In Bercher about 347 or (39.5%) of the population have completed non-mandatory upper secondary education, and 108 or (12.3%) have completed additional higher education (either university or a Fachhochschule). Of the 108 who completed tertiary schooling, 63.9% were Swiss men, 19.4% were Swiss women, 11.1% were non-Swiss men and 5.6% were non-Swiss women.

In the 2009/2010 school year there were a total of 178 students in the Bercher school district. In the Vaud cantonal school system, two years of non-obligatory pre-school are provided by the political districts. During the school year, the political district provided pre-school care for a total of 296 children of which 96 children (32.4%) received subsidized pre-school care. The canton's primary school program requires students to attend for four years. There were 93 students in the municipal primary school program. The obligatory lower secondary school program lasts for six years and there were 83 students in those schools. There were also 2 students who were home schooled or attended another non-traditional school.

As of 2000, there were 38 students in Bercher who came from another municipality, while 96 residents attended schools outside the municipality.
