= Pailly, Vaud =

Pailly
- Municipality
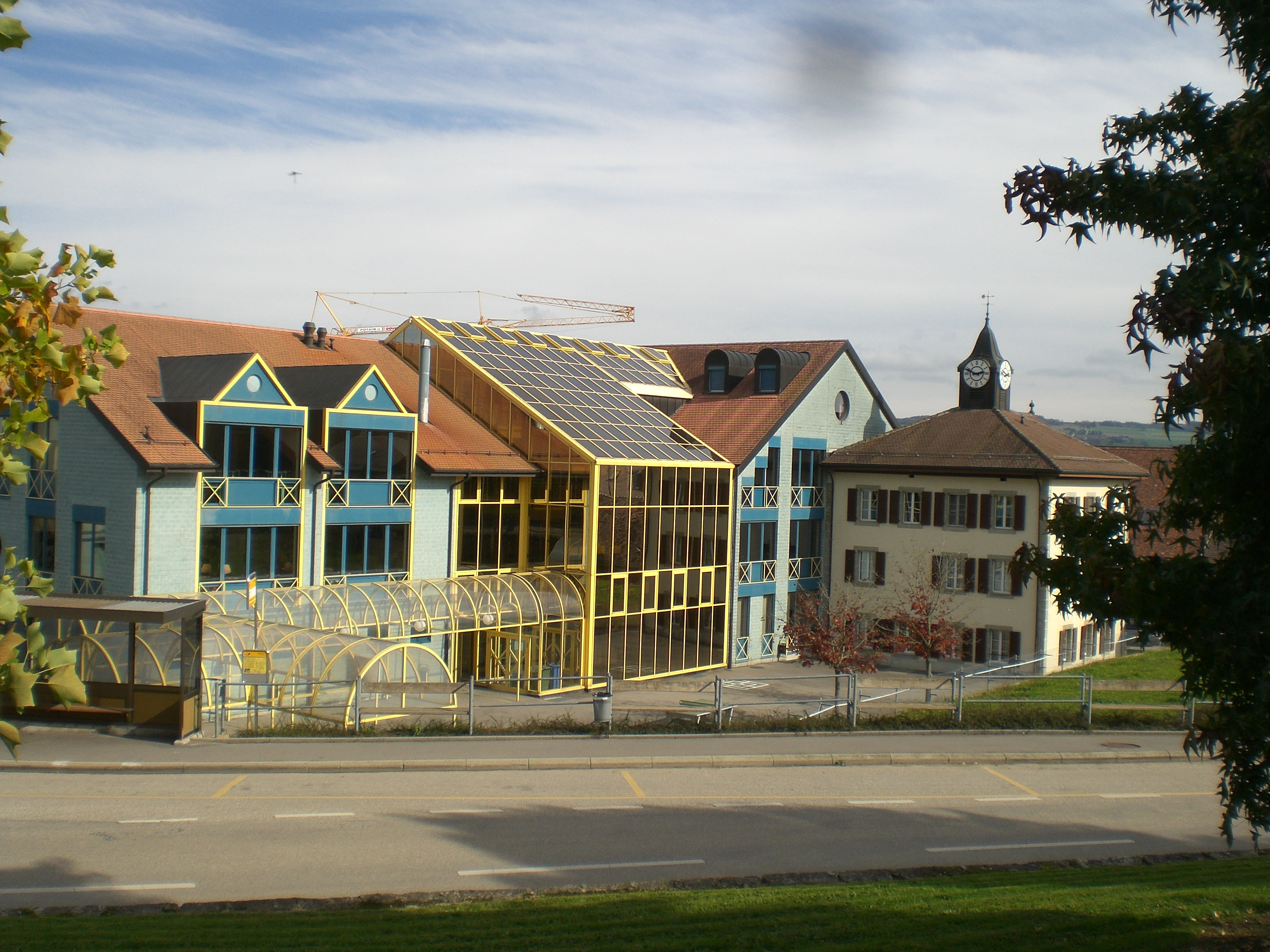

- Flag Coat of arms
- Location of Pailly
- Location within Switzerland Location within Canton of Vaud
- Coordinates: 46°42′N 6°41′E
- Country: Switzerland
- Canton: Vaud
- District: Gros-de-Vaud

Government
  - Mayor: Syndic

Area
  - Total: 5.77 km^{2} (2.23 sq mi)
- Elevation: 642 m (2,106 ft)

Population (December 2004)
  - Total: 424
  - Density: 73.5/km^{2} (190/sq mi)
- Time zone: UTC+01:00 (CET)
  - Summer (DST): UTC+02:00 (CEST)
- Postal code: 1416
- SFOS number: 5530
- ISO 3166 code: CH-VD
- Surrounded by: Essertines-sur-Yverdon, Fey, Oppens, Orzens, Rueyres, Vuarrens
- Website: pailly.ch

Pailly (French pronunciation: [paji]) is a municipality in the district of Gros-de-Vaud in the canton of Vaud in Switzerland.

== History ==
Pailly is first mentioned in 1154 as Parli.

== Geography ==
Pailly has an area, as of 2009, of 5.77 square kilometers (2.23 sq mi). Of this area, 4.34 km^{2} (1.68 sq mi) or 75.2% is used for agricultural purposes, while 1.02 km^{2} (0.39 sq mi) or 17.7% is forested. Of the rest of the land, 0.38 km^{2} (0.15 sq mi) or 6.6% is settled (buildings or roads), 0.01 km^{2} (2.5 acres) or 0.2% is either rivers or lakes.

Of the built up area, housing and buildings made up 2.9% and transportation infrastructure made up 3.1%. Out of the forested land, all of the forested land area is covered with heavy forests. Of the agricultural land, 62.0% is used for growing crops and 11.4% is pastures, while 1.7% is used for orchards or vine crops. All the water in the municipality is in lakes.

The municipality was part of the Échallens District until it was dissolved on 31 August 2006, and Pailly became part of the new district of Gros-de-Vaud.

The municipality is located on the left bank of the Sauteruz river, across from the Échallens–Yverdon-les-Bains road. It consists of the village of Pailly and the hamlets of Le Remble and Moulin Pacot.

== Coat of arms ==
The blazon of the municipal coat of arms is Pally of Six Argent and Azure, overall on a Bend Gules three Saltires couped Or.

== Demographics ==
Pailly has a population (as of December 2020) of 568. As of 2008, 8.4% of the population are resident foreign nationals. Over the last 10 years (1999–2009) the population has changed at a rate of 15.3%. It has changed at a rate of 15.3% due to migration and at a rate of 1.6% due to births and deaths.

Most of the population (as of 2000) speaks French (351 or 90.2%), with Portuguese being second most common (20 or 5.1%) and German being third (11 or 2.8%). There is 1 person who speaks Italian.

Of the population in the municipality 145 or about 37.3% were born in Pailly and lived there in 2000. There were 155 or 39.8% who were born in the same canton, while 37 or 9.5% were born somewhere else in Switzerland, and 52 or 13.4% were born outside of Switzerland.

In 2008 there were 4 live births to Swiss citizens and were 3 deaths of Swiss citizens. Ignoring immigration and emigration, the population of Swiss citizens increased by 1 while the foreign population remained the same. At the same time, there were 4 non-Swiss men and 2 non-Swiss women who immigrated from another country to Switzerland. The total Swiss population change in 2008 (from all sources, including moves across municipal borders) was an increase of 3 and the non-Swiss population remained the same. This represents a population growth rate of 0.7%.

The age distribution, as of 2009, in Pailly is; 53 children or 12.1% of the population are between 0 and 9 years old and 59 teenagers or 13.5% are between 10 and 19. Of the adult population, 57 people or 13.0% of the population are between 20 and 29 years old. 59 people or 13.5% are between 30 and 39, 65 people or 14.9% are between 40 and 49, and 64 people or 14.6% are between 50 and 59. The senior population distribution is 44 people or 10.1% of the population are between 60 and 69 years old, 24 people or 5.5% are between 70 and 79, there are 9 people or 2.1% who are between 80 and 89, and there are 3 people or 0.7% who are 90 and older.

As of 2000, there were 158 people who were single and never married in the municipality. There were 210 married individuals, 14 widows or widowers and 7 individuals who are divorced.

As of 2000, there were 153 private households in the municipality, and an average of 2.5 persons per household. There were 36 households that consist of only one person and 18 households with five or more people. Out of a total of 153 households that answered this question, 23.5% were households made up of just one person and there was 1 adult who lived with their parents. Of the rest of the households, there are 53 married couples without children, 56 married couples with children There were 4 single parents with a child or children. There were 3 households that were made up of unrelated people.

In 2000 there were 60 single family homes (or 50.8% of the total) out of a total of 118 inhabited buildings. There were 18 multi-family buildings (15.3%), along with 37 multi-purpose buildings that were mostly used for housing (31.4%) and 3 other use buildings (commercial or industrial) that also had some housing (2.5%). Of the single family homes 15 were built before 1919, while 9 were built between 1990 and 2000. The most multi-family homes (10) were built before 1919 and the next most (4) were built between 1971 and 1980.

In 2000 there were 170 apartments in the municipality. The most common apartment size was 4 rooms of which there were 40. There were 11 single room apartments and 67 apartments with five or more rooms. Of these apartments, a total of 149 apartments (87.6% of the total) were permanently occupied, while 8 apartments (4.7%) were seasonally occupied and 13 apartments (7.6%) were empty. As of 2009, the construction rate of new housing units was 0 new units per 1000 residents. The vacancy rate for the municipality, in 2010, was 0%.

The historical population is given in the following chart:

== Politics ==
In the 2007 federal election the most popular party was the SVP which received 41.64% of the vote. The next three most popular parties were the FDP (17.6%), the Green Party (12.85%) and the SP (12.44%). In the federal election, a total of 137 votes were cast, and the voter turnout was 46.1%.

== Economy ==
As of 2010, Pailly had an unemployment rate of 2.8%. As of 2008, there were 48 people employed in the primary economic sector and about 17 businesses involved in this sector. 15 people were employed in the secondary sector and there were 3 businesses in this sector. 44 people were employed in the tertiary sector, with 9 businesses in this sector. There were 228 residents of the municipality who were employed in some capacity, of which females made up 41.2% of the workforce.

In 2008 the total number of full-time equivalent jobs was 75. The number of jobs in the primary sector was 30, all of which were in agriculture. The number of jobs in the secondary sector was 14 of which 7 or (50.0%) were in manufacturing and 7 (50.0%) were in construction. The number of jobs in the tertiary sector was 31. In the tertiary sector; 5 or 16.1% were in a hotel or restaurant, 1 was in the information industry, 1 was a technical professional or scientist, 21 or 67.7% were in education.

In 2000, there were 32 workers who commuted into the municipality and 137 workers who commuted away. The municipality is a net exporter of workers, with about 4.3 workers leaving the municipality for every one entering. Of the working population, 8.8% used public transportation to get to work, and 59.2% used a private car.

== Religion ==
From the 2000 census, 80 or 20.6% were Roman Catholic, while 241 or 62.0% belonged to the Swiss Reformed Church. Of the rest of the population, there were 4 individuals (or about 1.03% of the population) who belonged to the Christian Catholic Church, and there were 24 individuals (or about 6.17% of the population) who belonged to another Christian church. There was 1 individual who was Islamic. There were 1 individual who belonged to another church. 50 (or about 12.85% of the population) belonged to no church, are agnostic or atheist.

== Education ==
In Pailly about 153 or (39.3%) of the population have completed non-mandatory upper secondary education, and 39 or (10.0%) have completed additional higher education (either university or a Fachhochschule). Of the 39 who completed tertiary schooling, 56.4% were Swiss men, 28.2% were Swiss women.

In the 2009/2010 school year there were a total of 70 students in the Pailly school district. In the Vaud cantonal school system, two years of non-obligatory pre-school are provided by the political districts. During the school year, the political district provided pre-school care for a total of 296 children of which 96 children (32.4%) received subsidized pre-school care. The canton's primary school program requires students to attend for four years. There were 39 students in the municipal primary school program. The obligatory lower secondary school program lasts for six years and there were 30 students in those schools. There were also 1 students who were home schooled or attended another non-traditional school.

As of 2000, there were 127 students in Pailly who came from another municipality, while 54 residents attended schools outside the municipality.
