= Oppens =

- Municipality
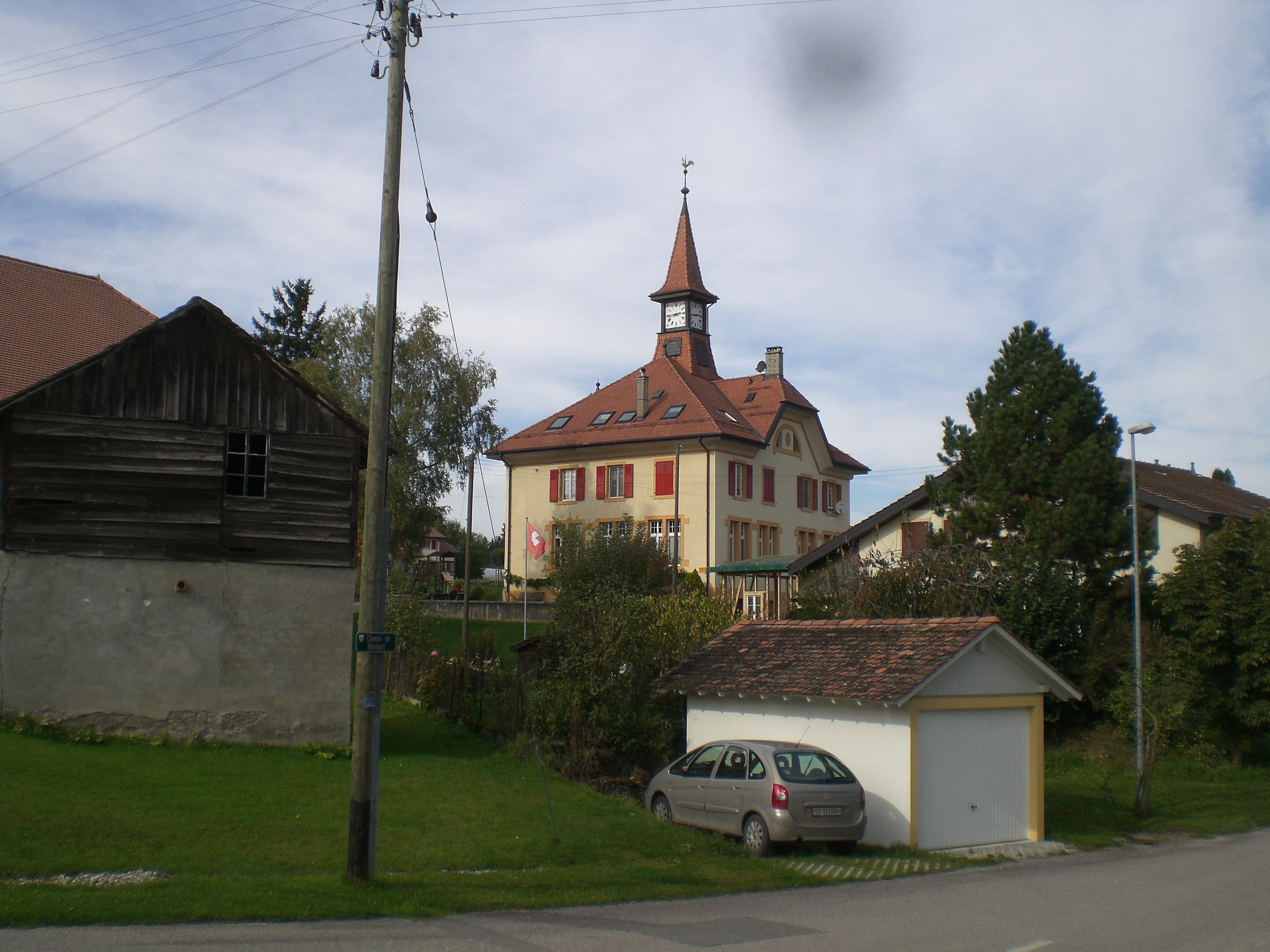

- Flag Coat of arms
- Location of Oppens
- Location within Switzerland Location within Canton of Vaud
- Coordinates: 46°43′N 6°42′E
- Country: Switzerland
- Canton: Vaud
- District: Gros-de-Vaud

Government
  - Mayor: Syndic; Pascal Pitton

Area
  - Total: 3.60 km^{2} (1.39 sq mi)
- Elevation: 556 m (1,824 ft)

Population (2003)
  - Total: 170
  - Density: 47/km^{2} (120/sq mi)
- Time zone: UTC+01:00 (CET)
  - Summer (DST): UTC+02:00 (CEST)
- Postal code: 1047
- SFOS number: 5923
- ISO 3166 code: CH-VD
- Surrounded by: Bercher, Bioley-Magnoux, Ogens, Orzens, Pailly, Rueyres
- Website: www.oppens.ch

Oppens is a municipality in the district of Gros-de-Vaud in the canton of Vaud in Switzerland.

== History ==
Oppens is first mentioned around 1160-64 as Opens.

== Geography ==
Oppens has an area, as of 2009, of 3.6 square kilometers (1.4 mi^{2}). Of this area, 2.35 km^{2} (0.91 mi^{2}) or 65.5% is used for agricultural purposes, while 1.03 km^{2} (0.40 mi^{2}) or 28.7% is forested. Of the rest of the land, 0.22 km^{2} (0.085 mi^{2}) or 6.1% is settled (buildings or roads), 0.03 km^{2} (7.4 acres) or 0.8% is either rivers or lakes.

Of the built up area, housing and buildings made up 2.8% and transportation infrastructure made up 2.5%. Out of the forested land, 26.7% of the total land area is heavily forested and 1.9% is covered with orchards or small clusters of trees. Of the agricultural land, 56.8% is used for growing crops and 7.0% is pastures, while 1.7% is used for orchards or vine crops. All the water in the village is flowing water.

The municipality was part of the Yverdon District until it was dissolved on 31 August 2006, and Oppens became part of the new district of Gros-de-Vaud.

The village is located away from the main roads along the Sauteruz river. It consists of the village of Oppens on the left side of the Sauteruz and the hamlet of La Tuilière on the right side.

== Coat of arms ==
The blazon of the municipal coat of arms is Vert, three Bars wavy Argent, in Chief Argent a capital O Or.

== Demographics ==
Oppens has a population (as of December 2020) of 204. As of 2008, 21.7% of the population are resident foreign nationals. Over the last 10 years (1999–2009 ) the population has changed at a rate of -0.6%. It has changed at a rate of -1.8% due to migration and at a rate of 0% due to births and deaths.

Most of the population (as of 2000) speaks French (144 or 84.7%) as their first language, with Portuguese being second most common (17 or 10.0%) and German being third (8 or 4.7%).

The age distribution, as of 2009, in Oppens is; 11 children or 6.7% of the population are between 0 and 9 years old and 26 teenagers or 16.0% are between 10 and 19. Of the adult population, 17 people or 10.4% of the population are between 20 and 29 years old. 22 people or 13.5% are between 30 and 39, 28 people or 17.2% are between 40 and 49, and 22 people or 13.5% are between 50 and 59. The senior population distribution is 16 people or 9.8% of the population are between 60 and 69 years old, 12 people or 7.4% are between 70 and 79, there are 8 people or 4.9% who are between 80 and 89, and there is 1 person who is 90 and older.

As of 2000, there were 65 people who were single and never married in the village. There were 89 married individuals, 10 widows or widowers and 6 individuals who are divorced.

As of 2000, there were 69 private households in the village, and an average of 2.4 persons per household. There were 20 households that consist of only one person and 6 households with five or more people. Out of a total of 72 households that answered this question, 27.8% were households made up of just one person. Of the rest of the households, there are 22 married couples without children, 22 married couples with children There were 4 single parents with a child or children. There was 1 household that was made up of unrelated people and 3 households that were made up of some sort of institution or another collective housing.

In 2000 there were 35 single family homes (or 55.6% of the total) out of a total of 63 inhabited buildings. There were 5 multi-family buildings (7.9%), along with 20 multi-purpose buildings that were mostly used for housing (31.7%) and 3 other use buildings (commercial or industrial) that also had some housing (4.8%).

In 2000, a total of 66 apartments (84.6% of the total) were permanently occupied, while 10 apartments (12.8%) were seasonally occupied and 2 apartments (2.6%) were empty. As of 2009, the construction rate of new housing units was 0 new units per 1000 residents. The vacancy rate for the village, in 2010, was 0%.

The historical population is given in the following chart:

== Politics ==
In the 2007 federal election the most popular party was the SVP which received 29.98% of the vote. The next three most popular parties were the FDP (22.35%), the Green Party (14.71%) and the PdA Party (8.63%). In the federal election, a total of 53 votes were cast, and the voter turnout was 52.0%.

== Economy ==
As of 2010, Oppens had an unemployment rate of 4.4%. As of 2008, there were 67 people employed in the primary economic sector and about 8 businesses involved in this sector. 10 people were employed in the secondary sector and there were 3 businesses in this sector. 21 people were employed in the tertiary sector, with 4 businesses in this sector. There were 84 residents of the village who were employed in some capacity, of which females made up 34.5% of the workforce.

In 2008 the total number of full-time equivalent jobs was 77. The number of jobs in the primary sector was 50, of which 45 were in agriculture and 5 were in forestry or lumber production. The number of jobs in the secondary sector was 8 of which 5 or (62.5%) were in manufacturing and 4 (50.0%) were in construction. The number of jobs in the tertiary sector was 19. In the tertiary sector; 16 or 84.2% were in wholesale or retail sales or the repair of motor vehicles, 3 or 15.8% were technical professionals or scientists, 1 was in education.

In 2000, there were 21 workers who commuted into the village and 47 workers who commuted away. The village is a net exporter of workers, with about 2.2 workers leaving the village for every one entering. Of the working population, 4.8% used public transportation to get to work, and 53.6% used a private car.

== Religion ==
From the 2000 census, 47 or 27.6% were Roman Catholic, while 107 or 62.9% belonged to the Swiss Reformed Church. 14 (or about 8.24% of the population) belonged to no church, are agnostic or atheist, and 2 individuals (or about 1.18% of the population) did not answer the question.

== Education ==
In Oppens about 54 or (31.8%) of the population have completed non-mandatory upper secondary education, and 24 or (14.1%) have completed additional higher education (either university or a Fachhochschule). Of the 24 who completed tertiary schooling, 75.0% were Swiss men, 20.8% were Swiss women.

In the 2009/2010 school year there were a total of 21 students in the Oppens school district. In the Vaud cantonal school system, two years of non-obligatory pre-school are provided by the political districts. During the school year, the political district provided pre-school care for a total of 296 children of which 96 children (32.4%) received subsidized pre-school care. The canton's primary school program requires students to attend for four years. There were 10 students in the municipal primary school program. The obligatory lower secondary school program lasts for six years and there were 11 students in those schools.

As of 2000, there were 12 students in Oppens who came from another village, while 25 residents attended schools outside the village.
