= Vuarrens =

- Municipality
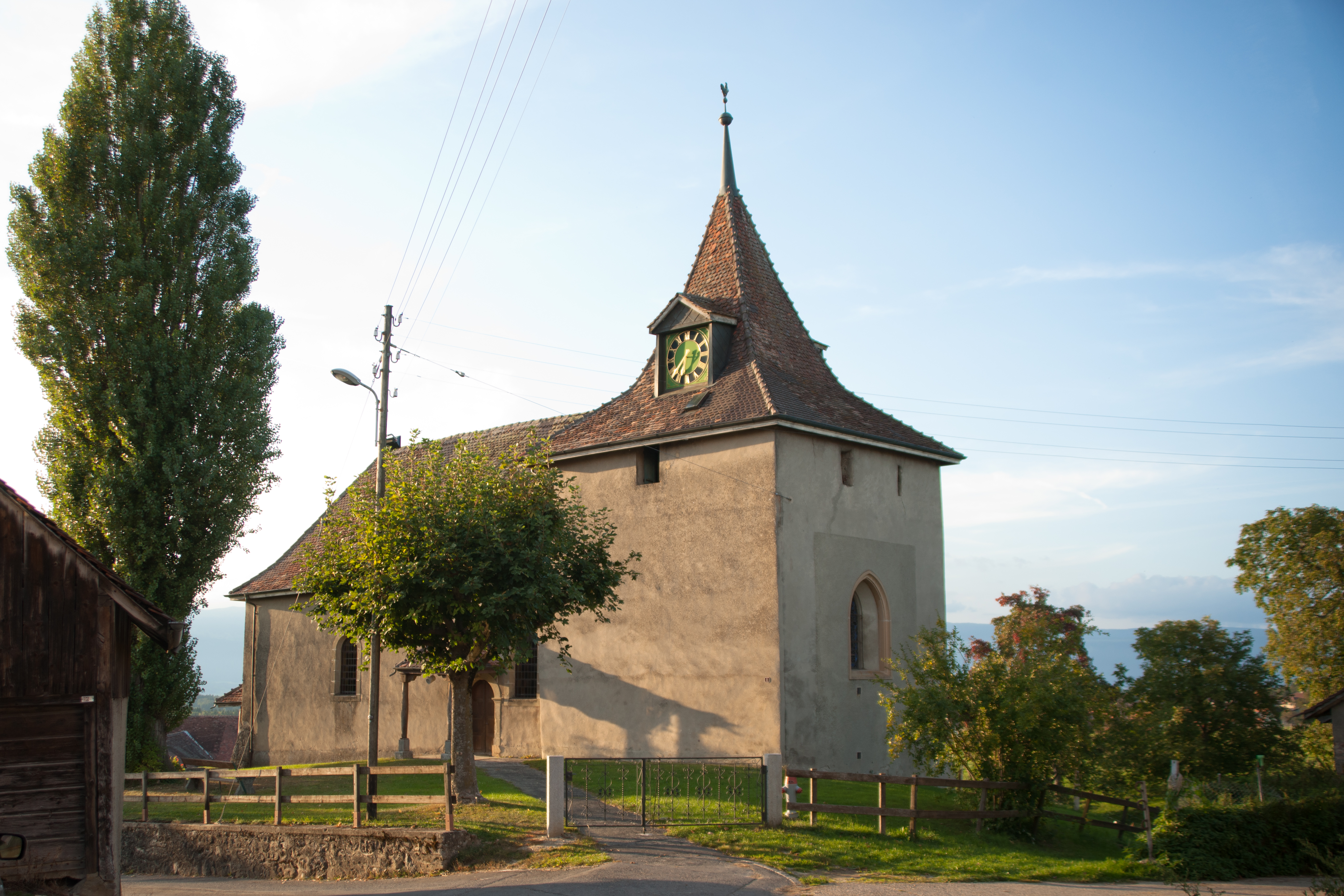
- Vuarrens village church

- Flag Coat of arms
- Location of Vuarrens
- Location within Switzerland Location within Canton of Vaud
- Coordinates: 46°41′N 6°39′E
- Country: Switzerland
- Canton: Vaud
- District: Gros-de-Vaud

Government
  - Mayor: Syndic

Area
  - Total: 8.96 km^{2} (3.46 sq mi)
- Elevation: 677 m (2,221 ft)

Population (December 2004)
  - Total: 599
  - Density: 66.9/km^{2} (173/sq mi)
- Time zone: UTC+01:00 (CET)
  - Summer (DST): UTC+02:00 (CEST)
- Postal code: 1418
- SFOS number: 5539
- ISO 3166 code: CH-VD
- Surrounded by: Corcelles-sur-Chavornay, Essertines-sur-Yverdon, Fey, Pailly, Penthéréaz, Villars-le-Terroir
- Website: https://www.vuarrens.ch Profile (in French), SFSO statistics

Vuarrens is a municipality in the district of Gros-de-Vaud in the canton of Vaud in Switzerland.

== Geography ==
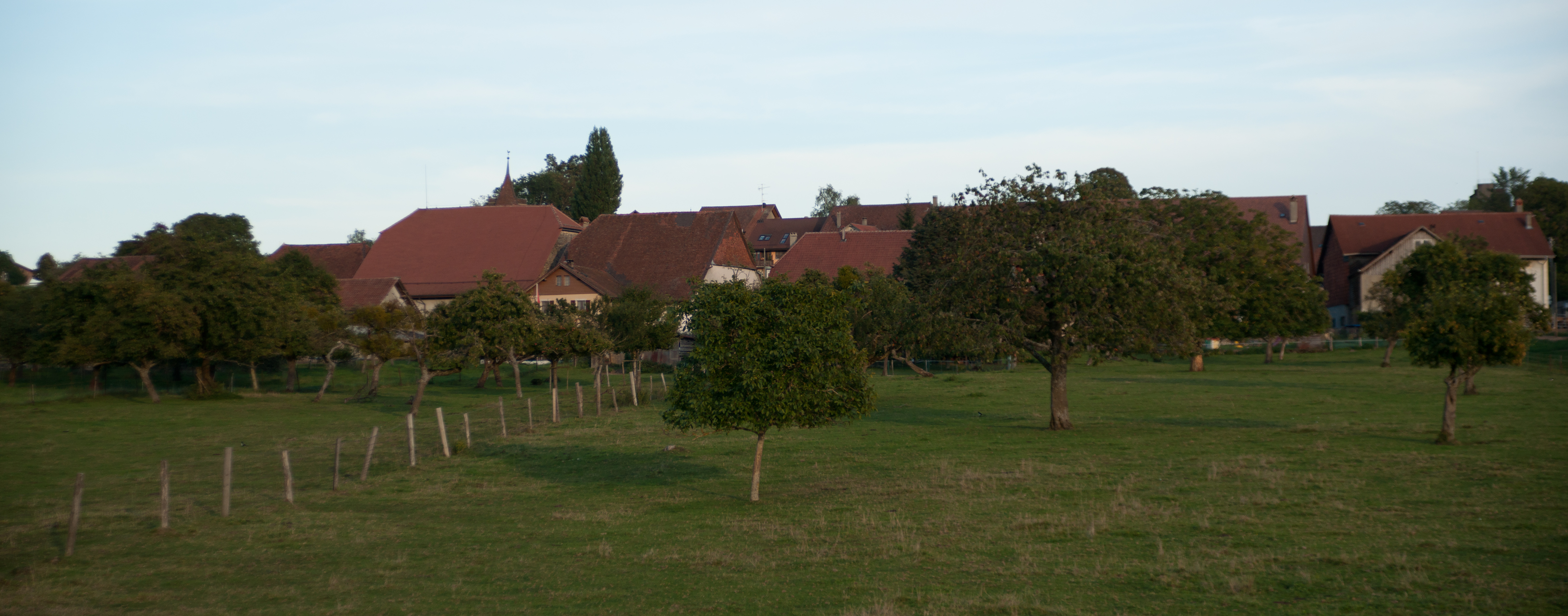
Vuarrens

Vuarrens has an area, as of 2009, of 8.96 square kilometres (3.46 sq mi). Of this area, 6.33 km^{2} (2.44 sq mi) or 70.6% is used for agricultural purposes, while 2.16 km^{2} (0.83 sq mi) or 24.1% is forested. Of the rest of the land, 0.49 km^{2} (0.19 sq mi) or 5.5% is settled (buildings or roads).

Of the built up area, housing and buildings made up 2.7% and transportation infrastructure made up 2.2%. Out of the forested land, all of the forested land area is covered with heavy forests. Of the agricultural land, 56.7% is used for growing crops and 12.8% is pastures, while 1.1% is used for orchards or vine crops.

The municipality was part of the Échallens District until it was dissolved on 31 August 2006, and Vuarrens became part of the new district of Gros-de-Vaud.

== Coat of arms ==
The blazon of the municipal coat of arms is Per fess: 1. per pale Argent and Gules, two Pyxes counterchanged; 2. Vert, a Garb Or.

== Demographics ==
Vuarrens has a population (as of December 2020) of 1,060. As of 2008, 8.1% of the population are resident foreign nationals. Over the last 10 years (1999–2009 ) the population has changed at a rate of 38.4%. It has changed at a rate of 30.6% due to migration and at a rate of 8.2% due to births and deaths.

Most of the population (as of 2000) speaks French (533 or 94.3%), with German being second most common (14 or 2.5%) and Spanish being third (6 or 1.1%). There are 4 people who speak Italian.

Of the population in the municipality 202 or about 35.8% were born in Vuarrens and lived there in 2000. There were 229 or 40.5% who were born in the same canton, while 74 or 13.1% were born somewhere else in Switzerland, and 47 or 8.3% were born outside of Switzerland.

In 2008 there were 6 live births to Swiss citizens and 1 birth to non-Swiss citizens, and in same time span there were 4 deaths of Swiss citizens and 1 non-Swiss citizen death. Ignoring immigration and emigration, the population of Swiss citizens increased by 2 while the foreign population remained the same. There were 2 Swiss men who emigrated from Switzerland. At the same time, there were 4 non-Swiss men who immigrated from another country to Switzerland. The total Swiss population change in 2008 (from all sources, including moves across municipal borders) was an increase of 17 and the non-Swiss population increased by 7 people. This represents a population growth rate of 3.5%.

The age distribution, as of 2009, in Vuarrens is; 119 children or 16.0% of the population are between 0 and 9 years old and 111 teenagers or 15.0% are between 10 and 19. Of the adult population, 79 people or 10.6% of the population are between 20 and 29 years old. 127 people or 17.1% are between 30 and 39, 102 people or 13.7% are between 40 and 49, and 74 people or 10.0% are between 50 and 59. The senior population distribution is 65 people or 8.8% of the population are between 60 and 69 years old, 31 people or 4.2% are between 70 and 79, there are 27 people or 3.6% who are between 80 and 89, and there are 7 people or 0.9% who are 90 and older.

As of 2000, there were 236 people who were single and never married in the municipality. There were 261 married individuals, 37 widows or widowers and 31 individuals who are divorced.

As of 2000, there were 216 private households in the municipality, and an average of 2.5 persons per household. There were 54 households that consist of only one person and 18 households with five or more people. Out of a total of 221 households that answered this question, 24.4% were households made up of just one person and there were 5 adults who lived with their parents. Of the rest of the households, there are 60 married couples without children, 76 married couples with children There were 16 single parents with a child or children. There were 5 households that were made up of unrelated people and 5 households that were made up of some sort of institution or another collective housing.

In 2000 there were 56 single family homes (or 42.1% of the total) out of a total of 133 inhabited buildings. There were 22 multi-family buildings (16.5%), along with 46 multi-purpose buildings that were mostly used for housing (34.6%) and 9 other use buildings (commercial or industrial) that also had some housing (6.8%). Of the single family homes 20 were built before 1919, while 3 were built between 1990 and 2000. The greatest number of multi-family homes (7) were built before 1919 and again between 1981 and 1990.

In 2000 there were 214 apartments in the municipality. The most common apartment size was 4 rooms of which there were 48. There were 9 single room apartments and 98 apartments with five or more rooms. Of these apartments, a total of 198 apartments (92.5% of the total) were permanently occupied, while 14 apartments (6.5%) were seasonally occupied and 2 apartments (0.9%) were empty. As of 2009, the construction rate of new housing units was 25.6 new units per 1000 residents. The vacancy rate for the municipality, in 2010, was 0%.

The historical population is given in the following chart:

== Politics ==
In the 2007 federal election the most popular party was the SVP which received 33.52% of the vote. The next three most popular parties were the Green Party (12.38%), the SP (12.04%) and the FDP (11.25%). In the federal election, a total of 206 votes were cast, and the voter turnout was 45.4%.

== Economy ==
As of 2010, Vuarrens had an unemployment rate of 3.7%. As of 2008, there were 55 people employed in the primary economic sector and about 28 businesses involved in this sector. 9 people were employed in the secondary sector and there were 6 businesses in this sector. 66 people were employed in the tertiary sector, with 17 businesses in this sector. There were 284 residents of the municipality who were employed in some capacity, of which females made up 41.5% of the workforce.

In 2008 the total number of full-time equivalent jobs was 94. The number of jobs in the primary sector was 38, all of which were in agriculture. The number of jobs in the secondary sector was 9 of which 3 or (33.3%) were in manufacturing and 6 (66.7%) were in construction. The number of jobs in the tertiary sector was 47. In the tertiary sector; 12 or 25.5% were in wholesale or retail sales or the repair of motor vehicles, 3 or 6.4% were in a hotel or restaurant, 2 or 4.3% were in the information industry, 1 was a technical professional or scientist, 9 or 19.1% were in education and 10 or 21.3% were in health care.

In 2000, there were 42 workers who commuted into the municipality and 199 workers who commuted away. The municipality is a net exporter of workers, with about 4.7 workers leaving the municipality for every one entering. Of the working population, 7.4% used public transportation to get to work, and 68% used a private car.

== Religion ==
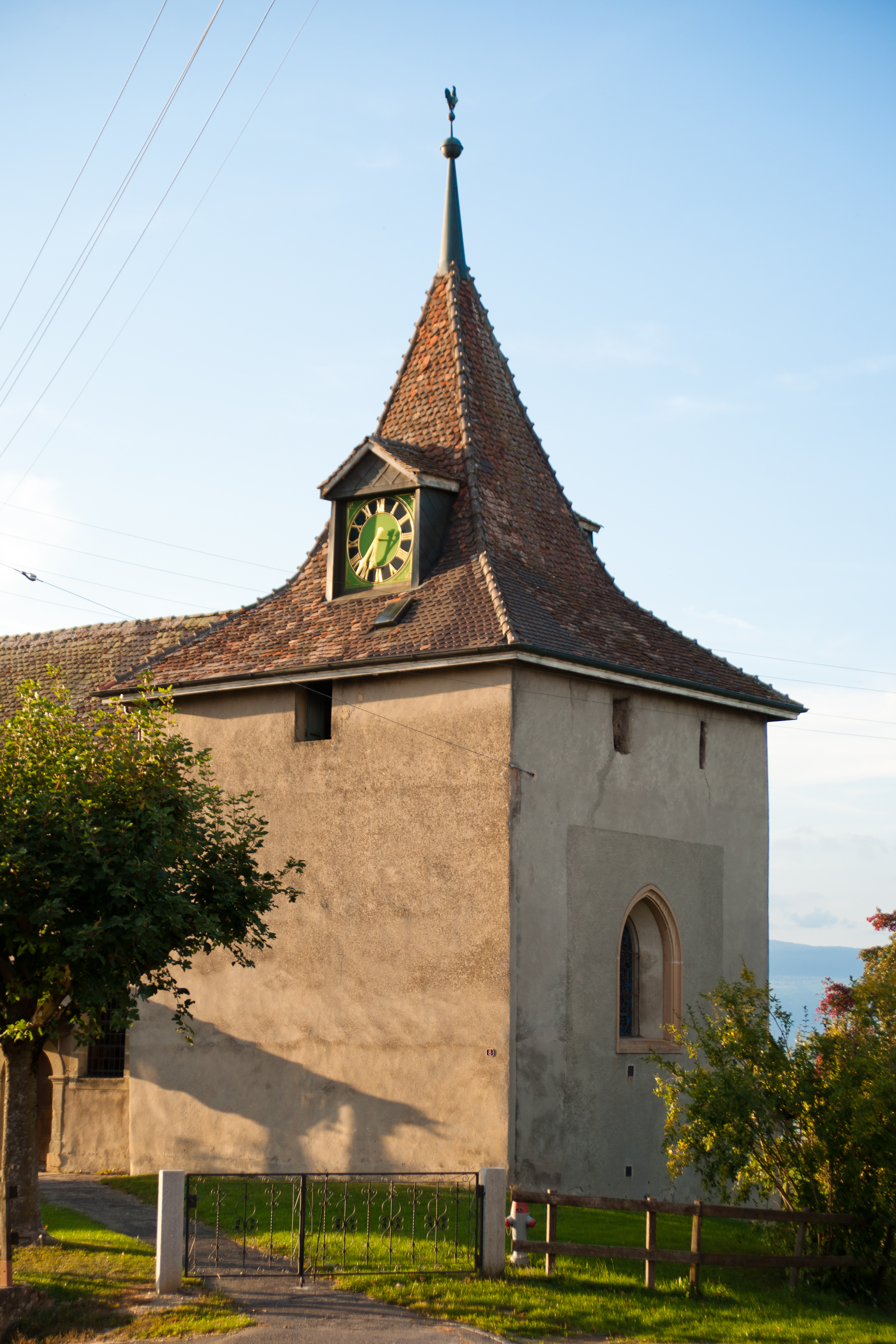
Tower of the Church of Vuarrens

From the 2000 census, 95 or 16.8% were Roman Catholic, while 392 or 69.4% belonged to the Swiss Reformed Church. Of the rest of the population, there were 32 individuals (or about 5.66% of the population) who belonged to another Christian church. There were 3 individuals (or about 0.53% of the population) who were Jewish, and 5 (or about 0.88% of the population) who were Islamic. 45 (or about 7.96% of the population) belonged to no church, are agnostic or atheist, and 9 individuals (or about 1.59% of the population) did not answer the question.

== Education ==
In Vuarrens about 225 or (39.8%) of the population have completed non-mandatory upper secondary education, and 57 or (10.1%) have completed additional higher education (either university or a Fachhochschule). Of the 57 who completed tertiary schooling, 64.9% were Swiss men, 29.8% were Swiss women.

In the 2009/2010 school year there were a total of 116 students in the Vuarrens school district. In the Vaud cantonal school system, two years of non-obligatory pre-school are provided by the political districts. During the school year, the political district provided pre-school care for a total of 296 children of which 96 children (32.4%) received subsidized pre-school care. The canton's primary school program requires students to attend for four years. There were 65 students in the municipal primary school program. The obligatory lower secondary school program lasts for six years and there were 51 students in those schools.

As of 2000, there were 23 students in Vuarrens who came from another municipality, while 60 residents attended schools outside the municipality.
