= Gros-de-Vaud District =

Coordinates: 46°37′59″N 6°37′59″E

Gros-de-Vaud District District du Gros-de-Vaud
- District
- Country: Switzerland
- Canton: Vaud
- Capital: Echallens

Area
  - Total: 230.78 km^{2} (89.10 sq mi)

Population (2020)
  - Total: 46,421
  - Density: 201.15/km^{2} (520.97/sq mi)
- Time zone: UTC+1 (CET)
  - Summer (DST): UTC+2 (CEST)
- Municipalities: 36

Gros-de-Vaud District (French: District du Gros-de-Vaud) is a district of the canton of Vaud. It was created in 2006, taking its name from the Gros-de-Vaud geographic region, which was described by the historian Louis Vulliemin in 1875.

== History ==
On 1 September 2006, the districts of Cossonay, Échallens, Moudon, Oron and Yverdon were dissolved, and some or all of their constituent municipalities were moved to form the Gros-de-Vaud district:

- The whole of the Échallens district was moved, comprising the municipalities of Assens, Bercher, Bioley-Orjulaz, Bottens, Bretigny-sur-Morrens, Cugy, Dommartin, Échallens, Éclagnens, Essertines-sur-Yverdon, Etagnières, Fey, Froideville, Goumoens-la-Ville, Goumoens-le-Jux, Malapalud, Morrens, Naz, Oulens-sous-Échallens, Pailly, Penthéréaz, Poliez-le-Grand, Poliez-Pittet, Rueyres, Saint-Barthélemy, Sugnens, Villars-le-Terroir, Villars-Tiercelin and Vuarrens
- The Cossonay district contributed the municipalities of Bettens, Bournens, Boussens, Daillens, Lussery-Villars, Mex, Penthalaz, Penthaz, Sullens and Vufflens-la-Ville
- The Moudon district contributed the municipalities of Boulens, Chapelle-sur-Moudon, Correvon, Denezy, Martherenges, Montaubion-Chardonney, Neyruz-sur-Moudon, Ogens, Peyres-Possens, Saint-Cierges, Sottens, Thierrens and Villars-Mendraz
- The municipality of Peney-le-Jorat came from the Oron district
- The municipality of Oppens came from the Yverdon district.

Since 2006, there have been some further changes:

- On 1 January 2009, the former municipality of Malapalud merged into the municipality of Assens.
- On 1 July 2011, the municipalities of Éclagnens, Goumoens-la-Ville and Goumoens-le-Jux merged into the new municipality of Goumoëns. The municipalities of Dommartin, Naz, Poliez-le-Grand and Sugnens merged into the new municipality of Montilliez. The municipalities of Villars-Tiercelin, Montaubion-Chardonney, Sottens, Villars-Mendraz and Peney-le-Jorat merged on 1 July 2011 into the new municipality of Jorat-Menthue.
- On 1 January 2013, the municipalities of Chapelle-sur-Moudon, Correvon, Denezy, Martherenges, Neyruz-sur-Moudon, Peyres-Possens, Saint-Cierges, Thierrens and Chanéaz (from the district of Jura-Nord Vaudois) merged into the new municipality of Montanaire.
- On 1 July 2021 the municipality of Bioley-Orjulaz merged into Assens.

== Geography ==
The district of Gros-de-Vaux is situated on the Gros-de-Vaux plateaux, between the city of Lausanne to the south and Yverdon-les-Bains to the north.

The district has an area, as of 2009, of 230.78 square kilometers (89.10 sq mi). Of this area, 154.01 km^{2} (59.46 sq mi) or 66.7% is used for agricultural purposes, while 54.62 km^{2} (21.09 sq mi) or 23.7% is forested. Of the rest of the land, 21.45 km^{2} (8.28 sq mi) or 9.3% is settled (buildings or roads) and 0.77 km^{2} (0.30 sq mi) or 0.3% is unproductive land.

== Demographics ==
Gros-de-Vaud has a population (as of December 2020) of 46,421.

In 2008 there were 312 live births to Swiss citizens and 54 births to non-Swiss citizens, and in same time span there were 217 deaths of Swiss citizens and 17 non-Swiss citizen deaths. Ignoring immigration and emigration, the population of Swiss citizens increased by 95 while the foreign population increased by 37. There were 17 Swiss men who emigrated from Switzerland and 6 Swiss women who immigrated back to Switzerland. At the same time, there were 156 non-Swiss men and 130 non-Swiss women who immigrated from another country to Switzerland. The total Swiss population change in 2008 (from all sources, including moves across municipal borders) was an increase of 527 and the non-Swiss population increased by 406 people. This represents a population growth rate of 2.7%.

The age distribution, as of 2009, in Gros-de-Vaud is; 4,635 children or 12.5% of the population are between 0 and 9 years old and 4,907 teenagers or 13.2% are between 10 and 19. Of the adult population, 4,193 people or 11.3% of the population are between 20 and 29 years old. 5,531 people or 14.9% are between 30 and 39, 6,224 people or 16.8% are between 40 and 49, and 4,699 people or 12.7% are between 50 and 59. The senior population distribution is 3,758 people or 10.1% of the population are between 60 and 69 years old, 1,991 people or 5.4% are between 70 and 79, there are 978 people or 2.6% who are 80 and 89, and there are 168 people or 0.5% who are 90 and older.

== Politics ==
In the 2007 federal election the most popular party was the SVP which received 27.84% of the vote. The next three most popular parties were the SP (18.3%), the FDP (14.87%) and the Green Party (13.33%). In the federal election, a total of 10,796 votes were cast, and the voter turnout was 46.6%.

== Municipalities ==
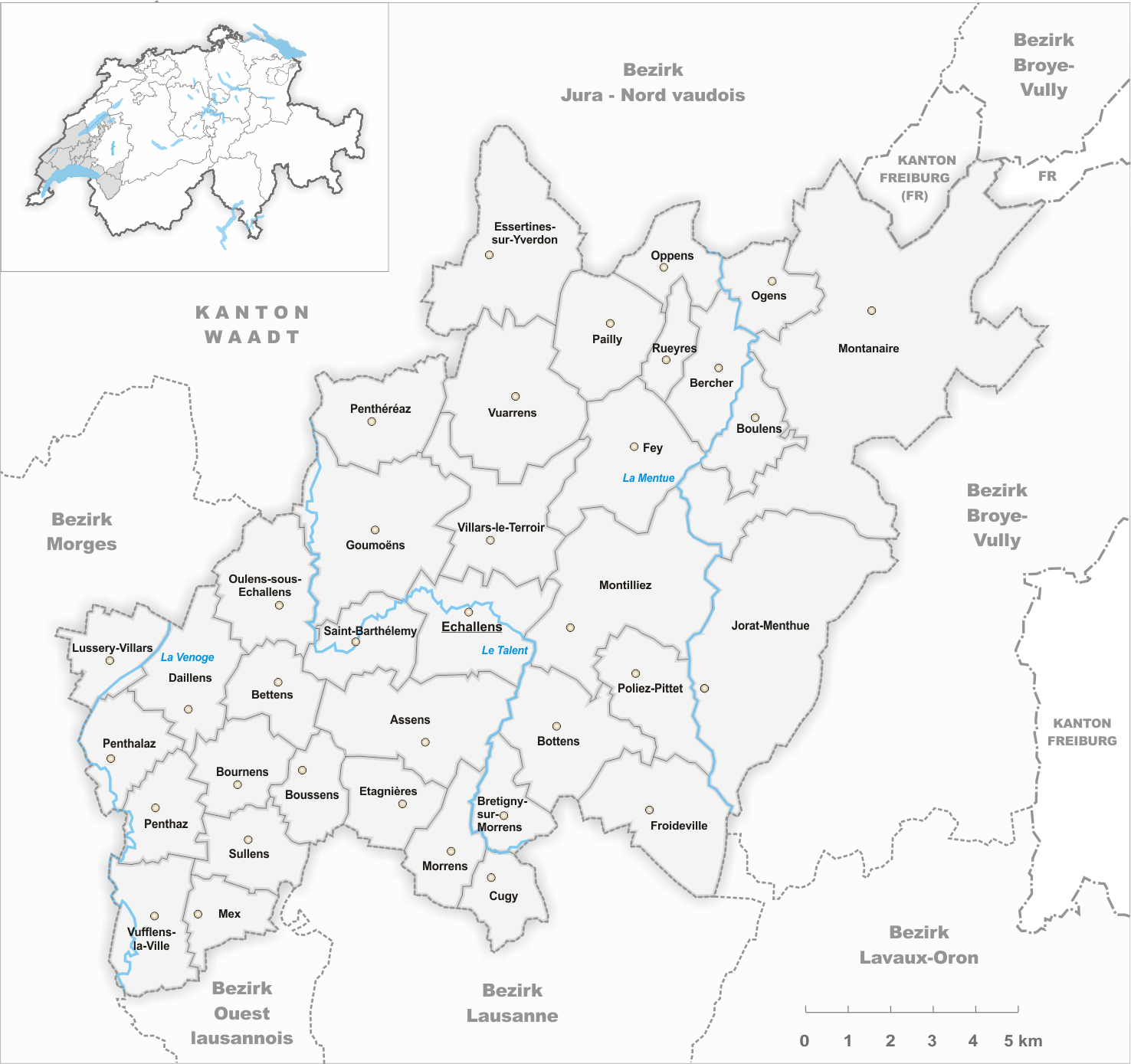
Map of the municipalities of the district in 2021

Municipality	Population (31 December 2020)	Area km^{2}
Assens	1,143	5.35
Bercher	1,322	4.25
Bettens	637	3.75
Bottens	1,331	6.89
Boulens	369	3.44
Bournens	491	3.90
Boussens	999	3.15
Bretigny-sur-Morrens	859	2.86
Cugy	2,762	2.90
Daillens	1,051	5.52
Échallens	5,729	6.66
Essertines-sur-Yverdon	1,037	9.75
Étagnières	1,146	3.79
Fey	749	7.35
Froideville	2,695	7.08
Goumoëns	1,153	13.9
Jorat-Menthue	1,602	20.9
Lussery-Villars	458	3.73
Mex	790	2.83
Montanaire	2,777	33.5
Montilliez	1,858	15.1
Morrens	1,154	3.66
Ogens	301	3.41
Oppens	204	3.59
Oulens-sous-Échallens	617	5.86
Pailly	568	5.77
Penthalaz	3,207	3.87
Penthaz	1,855	3.83
Penthéréaz	419	5.68
Poliez-Pittet	830	5.01
Rueyres	266	2.02
Saint-Barthélemy	783	4.12
Sullens	1,042	3.92
Villars-le-Terroir	1,280	7.09
Vuarrens	1,060	8.96
Vufflens-la-Ville	1,351	5.38
Total (36)	46,421	230.83

== See also ==
- Gros-de-Vaud
- Swiss Plateau
