= Penthes Castle =

Castle in Canton of Geneva, Switzerland

- Château de Penthes
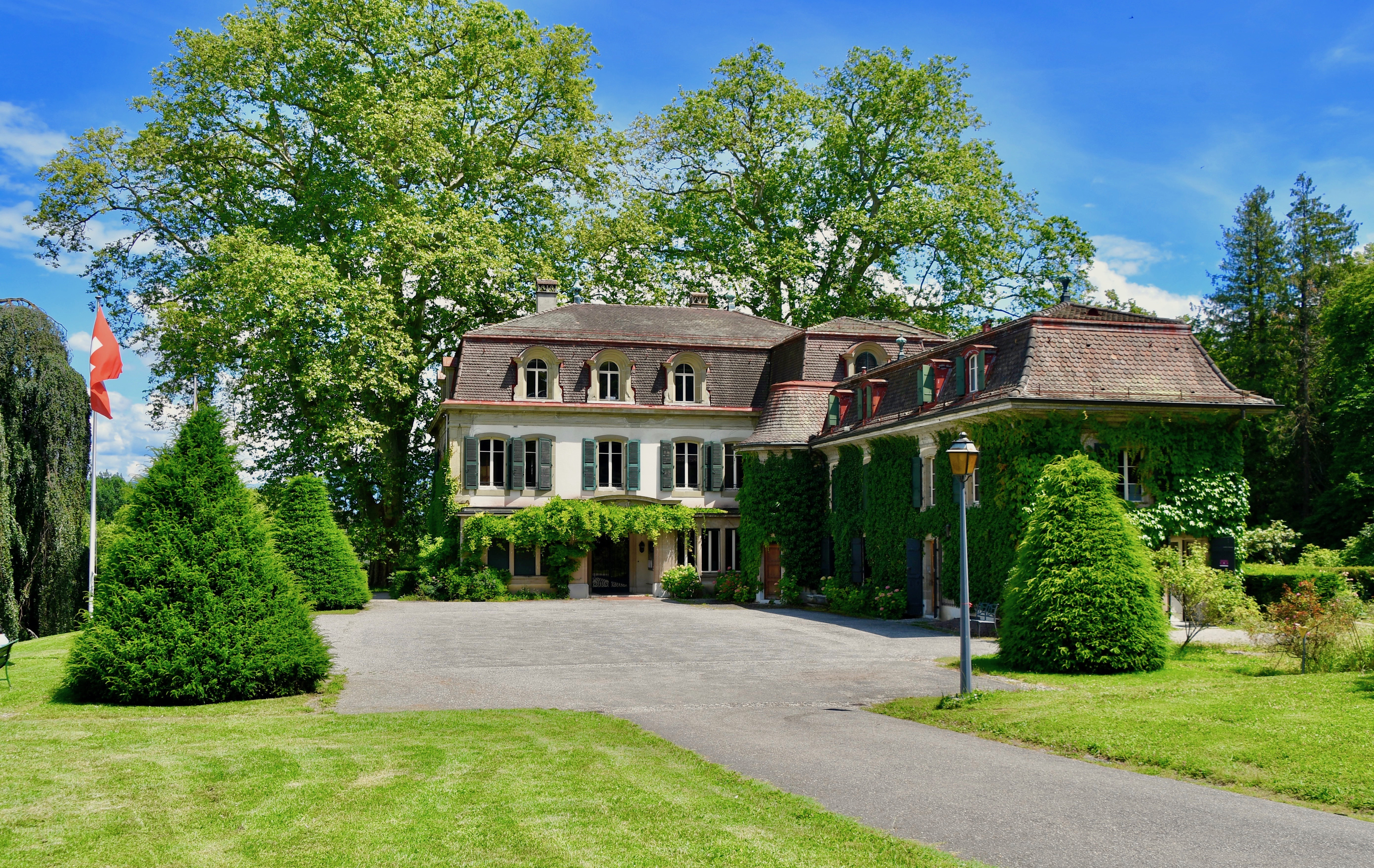
- Interactive map of the Penthes Castle area

General information
- Type: Manor house
- Location: Pregny-Chambésy, Switzerland
- Coordinates: 46°13′57″N 6°8′25″E
- Current tenants: The Foundation for the History of the Swiss Abroad
- Completed: 1761

Website
- www.penthes.ch

The Penthes Castle (French: Château de Penthes) is a castle in the municipality of Pregny-Chambésy, in the Canton of Geneva, Switzerland. It is classified as Cultural Property of National and Regional Significance.

The Penthes Castle is located within the Penthes estate (French: Domaine de Penthes). The estate is first documented as of 1358 as belonging to Guillaume de Visencier and housing a fortified house. During the 17th century, the estate becomes part of the fiefdom of Antoine de Charrière, lord of Penthaz. It is henceforth named after him. In 1761, the estate, then owned by the Geneva General Hospital (now known as the Geneva University Hospitals), is sold to Alexandre Sales de Genève, who transforms the fortified house into a manor.

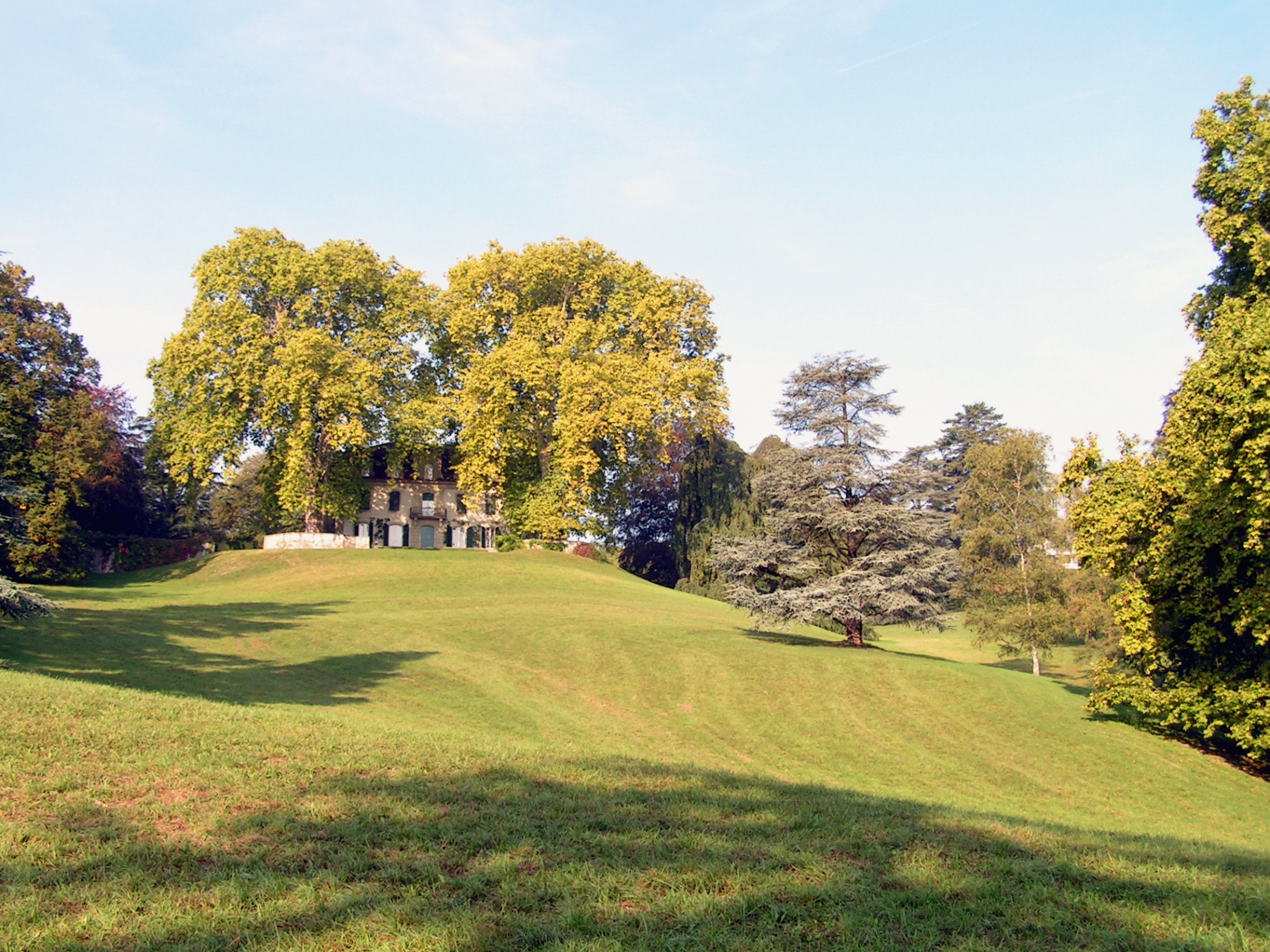
The Penthes estate

In 1972, the Canton of Geneva purchases the Penthes estate. The Foundation for the History of the Swiss Abroad, dedicated to studying and promoting the history of the relations between Switzerland and the rest of the world, moves in the Castle in 1978 and creates a museum as well as a research center. The City of Geneva acquires the estate in 1983 and turns it into a public parc.

== See also ==
- List of castles and fortresses in Switzerland
