= Ogens =

- Municipality
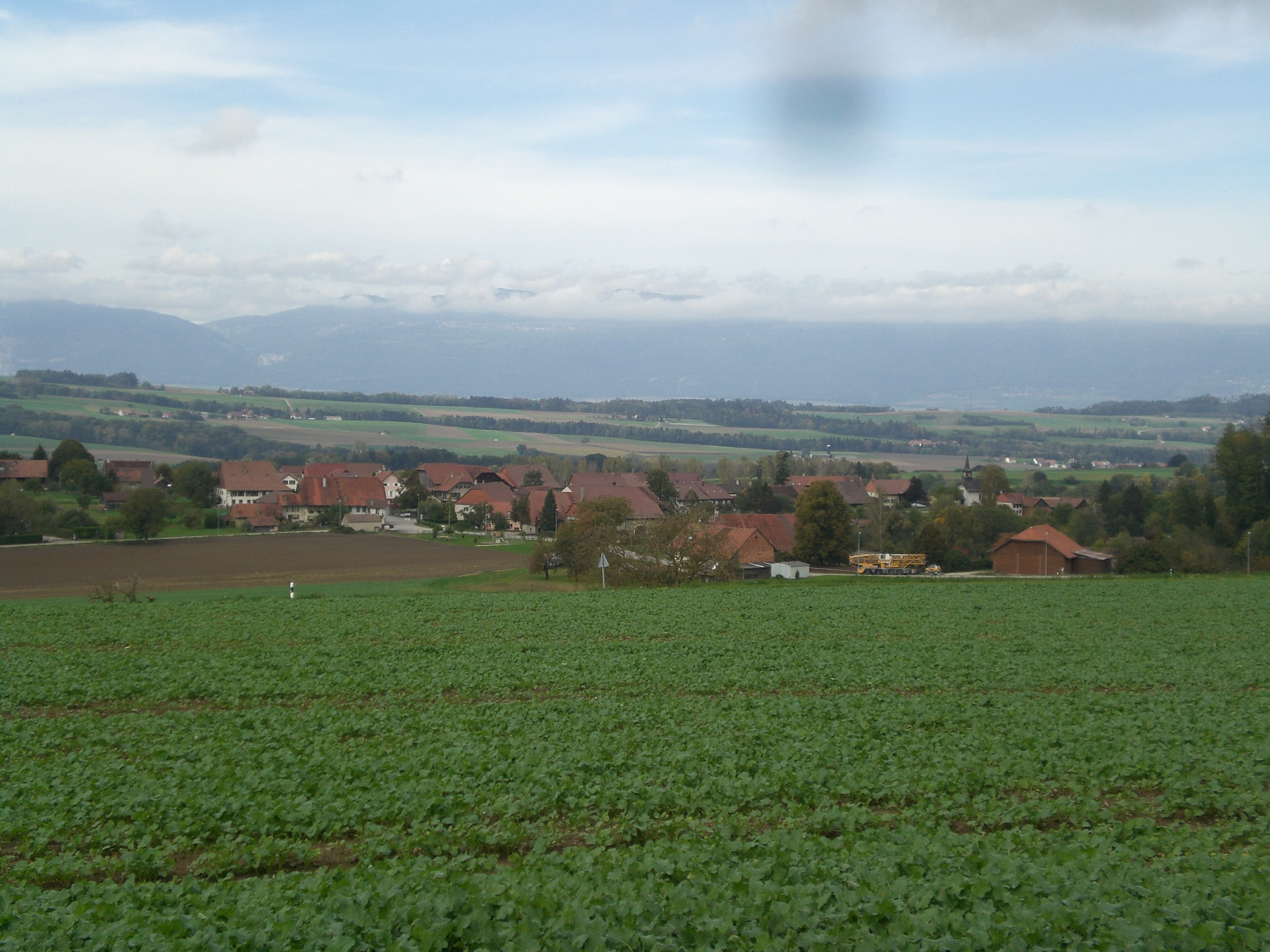

- Flag Coat of arms
- Location of Ogens
- Location within Switzerland Location within Canton of Vaud
- Coordinates: 46°43′N 6°43′E
- Country: Switzerland
- Canton: Vaud
- District: Gros-de-Vaud

Government
  - Mayor: Syndic

Area
  - Total: 3.41 km^{2} (1.32 sq mi)
- Elevation: 629 m (2,064 ft)

Population (2003)
  - Total: 256
  - Density: 75.1/km^{2} (194/sq mi)
- Time zone: UTC+01:00 (CET)
  - Summer (DST): UTC+02:00 (CEST)
- Postal code: 1045
- SFOS number: 5680
- ISO 3166 code: CH-VD
- Surrounded by: Bercher, Bioley-Magnoux, Correvon, Oppens, Saint-Cierges, Thierrens
- Website: https://www.ogens.ch Profile (in French), SFSO statistics

Ogens is a municipality in the district of Gros-de-Vaud in the canton of Vaud in Switzerland.

== History ==
Ogens is first mentioned in 1166 as Ogens.

== Geography ==
as of 2009, Ogens has an area of 3.4 square kilometers (1.3 mi^{2}). Of this area, 2.09 km^{2} (0.81 mi^{2}) or 61.3% is used for agricultural purposes, while 1.03 km^{2} (0.40 mi^{2}) or 30.2% is forested. Of the rest of the land, 0.27 km^{2} (0.10 mi^{2}) or 7.9% is settled (buildings or roads).

Of the built up area, housing and buildings made up 4.4% and transportation infrastructure made up 3.2%. Out of the forested land, 28.7% of the total land area is heavily forested and 1.5% is covered with orchards or small clusters of trees. Of the agricultural land, 49.3% is used for growing crops and 11.7% is pastures.

The municipality was part of the Moudon District until it was dissolved on 31 August 2006, and Ogens became part of the new district of Gros-de-Vaud.

The municipality is located between Echallens and Payerne. It consists of the linear village of Ogens, on a plateau along the right bank of the Mentue river.

== Coat of arms ==
The blazon of the municipal coat of arms is Per pale Gules and Vert, overall a Billy-goat rampant Argent.

== Demographics ==
Ogens has a population (as of December 2020) of 301. As of 2008, 6.5% of the population are resident foreign nationals. Over the last 10 years (1999–2009) the population has changed at a rate of 14.3%. It has changed at a rate of 7.8% due to migration and at a rate of 6.9% due to births and deaths.

Most of the population (as of 2000) speaks French (219 or 96.5%) with the rest speaking German

Of the population in the municipality 71 or about 31.3% were born in Ogens and lived there in 2000. There were 99 or 43.6% who were born in the same canton, while 32 or 14.1% were born somewhere else in Switzerland, and 16 or 7.0% were born outside of Switzerland.

In 2008 there was 1 live birth to Swiss citizens and 1 birth to non-Swiss citizens, and in same time span there were 3 deaths of Swiss citizens. Ignoring immigration and emigration, the population of Swiss citizens decreased by 2 while the foreign population increased by 1. At the same time, there were 2 non-Swiss men and 1 non-Swiss woman who immigrated from another country to Switzerland. The total Swiss population change in 2008 (from all sources, including moves across municipal borders) was a decrease of 14 and the non-Swiss population increased by 4 people. This represents a population growth rate of -3.9%.

The age distribution, as of 2009, in Ogens is; 34 children or 12.9% of the population are between 0 and 9 years old and 31 teenagers or 11.7% are between 10 and 19. Of the adult population, 30 people or 11.4% of the population are between 20 and 29 years old. 46 people or 17.4% are between 30 and 39, 37 people or 14.0% are between 40 and 49, and 32 people or 12.1% are between 50 and 59. The senior population distribution is 23 people or 8.7% of the population are between 60 and 69 years old, 21 people or 8.0% are between 70 and 79, there are 10 people or 3.8% who are between 80 and 89.

As of 2000, there were 89 people who were single and never married in the municipality. There were 103 married individuals, 13 widows or widowers and 22 individuals who are divorced.

As of 2000, there were 82 private households in the municipality, and an average of 2.7 persons per household. There were 14 households that consist of only one person and 7 households with five or more people. Out of a total of 84 households that answered this question, 16.7% were households made up of just one person and there was 1 adult who lived with their parents. Of the rest of the households, there are 25 married couples without children, 35 married couples with children There were 5 single parents with a child or children. There were 2 households that were made up of unrelated people and 2 households that were made up of some sort of institution or another collective housing.

In 2000 there were 49 single family homes (or 65.3% of the total) out of a total of 75 inhabited buildings. There were 10 multi-family buildings (13.3%), along with 15 multi-purpose buildings that were mostly used for housing (20.0%) and 1 other use buildings (commercial or industrial) that also had some housing (1.3%). Of the single family homes 29 were built before 1919, while 5 were built between 1990 and 2000. The most multi-family homes (7) were built before 1919 and the next most (1) were built between 1919 and 1945. There was 1 multi-family house built between 1996 and 2000.

In 2000 there were 93 apartments in the municipality. The most common apartment size was 5 rooms of which there were 28. There were 1 single room apartments and 44 apartments with five or more rooms. Of these apartments, a total of 81 apartments (87.1% of the total) were permanently occupied, while 9 apartments (9.7%) were seasonally occupied and 3 apartments (3.2%) were empty. As of 2009, the construction rate of new housing units was 15.2 new units per 1000 residents. The vacancy rate for the municipality, in 2010, was 0%.

The historical population is given in the following chart:

== Sights ==
The entire village of Ogens is designated as part of the Inventory of Swiss Heritage Sites.

== Politics ==
In the 2007 federal election the most popular party was the SVP which received 40.38% of the vote. The next three most popular parties were the Green Party (28.98%), the FDP (8.89%) and the SP (8.55%). In the federal election, a total of 85 votes were cast, and the voter turnout was 44.7%.

== Economy ==
As of 2010, Ogens had an unemployment rate of 3.8%. As of 2008, there were 19 people employed in the primary economic sector and about 8 businesses involved in this sector. 20 people were employed in the secondary sector and there were 3 businesses in this sector. 7 people were employed in the tertiary sector, with 3 businesses in this sector. There were 114 residents of the municipality who were employed in some capacity, of which females made up 41.2% of the workforce.

In 2008 the total number of full-time equivalent jobs was 36. The number of jobs in the primary sector was 14, all of which were in agriculture. The number of jobs in the secondary sector was 16 of which 4 or (25.0%) were in manufacturing and 12 (75.0%) were in construction. The number of jobs in the tertiary sector was 6. In the tertiary sector; 1 was in the sale or repair of motor vehicles.

In 2000, there were 8 workers who commuted into the municipality and 86 workers who commuted away. The municipality is a net exporter of workers, with about 10.8 workers leaving the municipality for every one entering. Of the working population, 9.6% used public transportation to get to work, and 71.1% used a private car.

== Religion ==
From the 2000 census, 35 or 15.4% were Roman Catholic, while 149 or 65.6% belonged to the Swiss Reformed Church. Of the rest of the population, there were 8 individuals (or about 3.52% of the population) who belonged to another Christian church. There was 1 individual who was Jewish, and 34 (or about 14.98% of the population) belonged to no church, are agnostic or atheist, and 4 individuals (or about 1.76% of the population) did not answer the question.

== Education ==
In Ogens about 89 or (39.2%) of the population have completed non-mandatory upper secondary education, and 23 or (10.1%) have completed additional higher education (either university or a Fachhochschule). Of the 23 who completed tertiary schooling, 52.2% were Swiss men, 47.8% were Swiss women.

In the 2009/2010 school year there were a total of 38 students in the Ogens school district. In the Vaud cantonal school system, two years of non-obligatory pre-school are provided by the political districts. During the school year, the political district provided pre-school care for a total of 296 children of which 96 children (32.4%) received subsidized pre-school care. The canton's primary school program requires students to attend for four years. There were 26 students in the municipal primary school program. The obligatory lower secondary school program lasts for six years and there were 12 students in those schools.

As of 2000, there were 36 students from Ogens who attended schools outside the municipality.
