= Sullens =

- Municipality
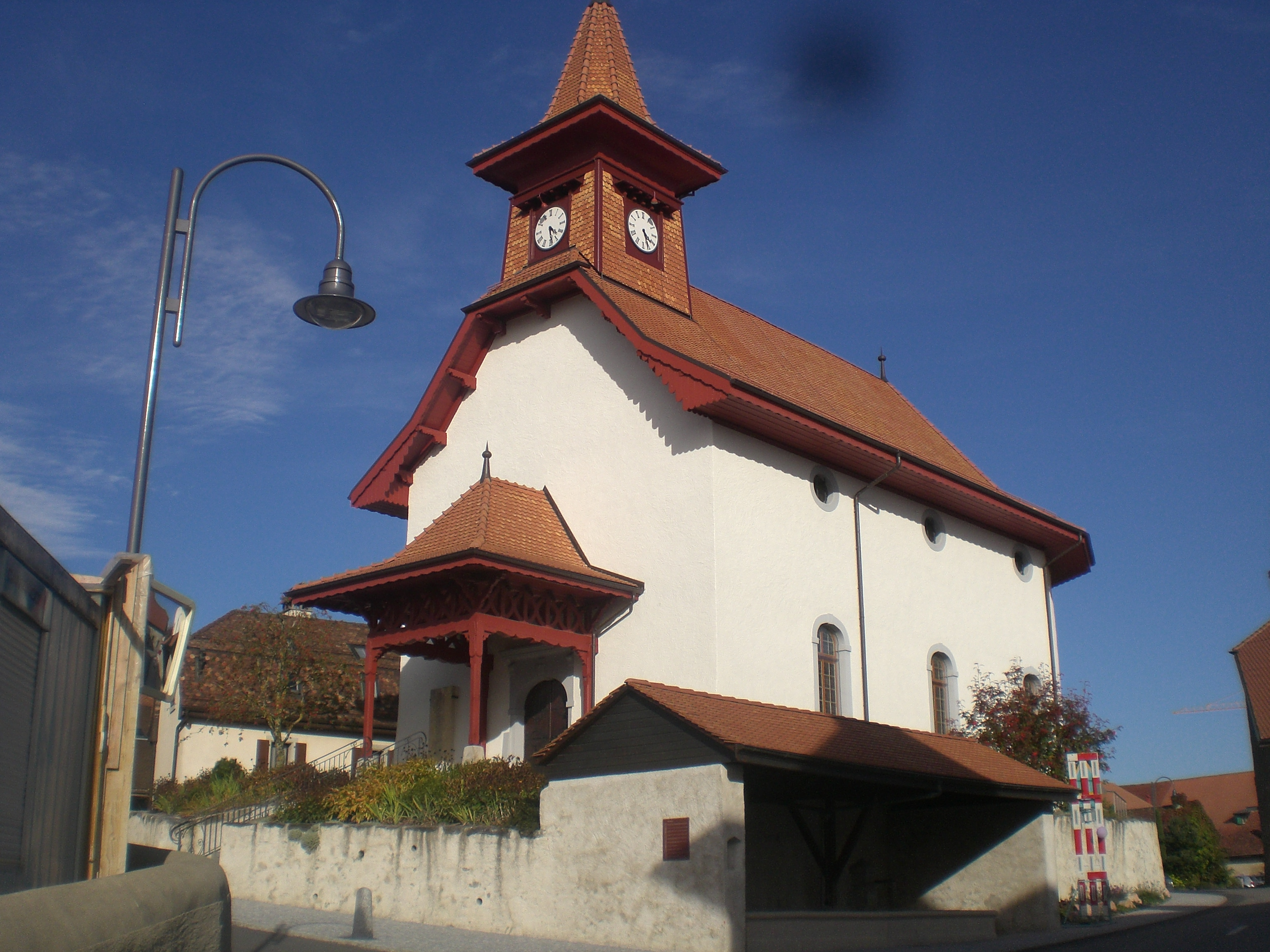

- Flag Coat of arms
- Location of Sullens
- Location within Switzerland Location within Canton of Vaud
- Coordinates: 46°36′N 06°34′E
- Country: Switzerland
- Canton: Vaud
- District: Gros-de-Vaud

Government
  - Mayor: Syndic

Area
  - Total: 3.92 km^{2} (1.51 sq mi)
- Elevation: 591 m (1,939 ft)

Population (2003)
  - Total: 849
  - Density: 217/km^{2} (561/sq mi)
- Time zone: UTC+01:00 (CET)
  - Summer (DST): UTC+02:00 (CEST)
- Postal code: 1036
- SFOS number: 5501
- ISO 3166 code: CH-VD
- Surrounded by: Bournens, Boussens, Cheseaux-sur-Lausanne, Crissier, Mex, Penthaz, Vufflens-la-Ville
- Website: www.sullens.ch

Sullens is a municipality of the canton of Vaud in Switzerland, located in the district of Gros-de-Vaud.

== History ==
Sullens is first mentioned in 1180 as Sollens.

== Geography ==
Aerial view (1949)

Sullens has an area, as of 2009, of 3.92 square kilometers (1.51 sq mi). Of this area, 2.8 km^{2} (1.1 sq mi) or 71.4% is used for agricultural purposes, while 0.5 km^{2} (0.19 sq mi) or 12.8% is forested. Of the rest of the land, 0.64 km^{2} (0.25 sq mi) or 16.3% is settled (buildings or roads).

Of the built up area, housing and buildings made up 7.7% and transportation infrastructure made up 7.9%. Out of the forested land, all of the forested land area is covered with heavy forests. Of the agricultural land, 66.3% is used for growing crops and 4.3% is pastures.

The municipality was part of the Cossonay District until it was dissolved on 31 August 2006, and Sullens became part of the new district of Gros-de-Vaud.

The municipality is located on the road between Lausanne and Cossonay.

== Coat of arms ==
The blazon of the municipal coat of arms is Or, a Bend Azure, overall a Cross bottony Gules.

== Demographics ==
Sullens has a population (as of December 2020) of 1,042. As of 2008, 9.9% of the population are resident foreign nationals. Over the last 10 years (1999–2009 ) the population has changed at a rate of 6.4%. It has changed at a rate of 1.6% due to migration and at a rate of 5.1% due to births and deaths.

Most of the population (as of 2000) speaks French (709 or 87.2%), with German being second most common (61 or 7.5%) and Italian being third (10 or 1.2%).

Of the population in the municipality 193 or about 23.7% were born in Sullens and lived there in 2000. There were 364 or 44.8% who were born in the same canton, while 139 or 17.1% were born somewhere else in Switzerland, and 112 or 13.8% were born outside of Switzerland.

In 2008 there were 3 live births to Swiss citizens and were 3 deaths of Swiss citizens. Ignoring immigration and emigration, the population of Swiss citizens remained the same while the foreign population remained the same. There were 3 Swiss men and 4 Swiss women who emigrated from Switzerland. At the same time, there were 4 non-Swiss men and 1 non-Swiss woman who immigrated from another country to Switzerland. The total Swiss population change in 2008 (from all sources, including moves across municipal borders) was an increase of 4 and the non-Swiss population decreased by 6 people. This represents a population growth rate of -0.2%.

The age distribution, as of 2009, in Sullens is; 89 children or 10.3% of the population are between 0 and 9 years old and 118 teenagers or 13.7% are between 10 and 19. Of the adult population, 74 people or 8.6% of the population are between 20 and 29 years old. 99 people or 11.5% are between 30 and 39, 152 people or 17.7% are between 40 and 49, and 127 people or 14.8% are between 50 and 59. The senior population distribution is 111 people or 12.9% of the population are between 60 and 69 years old, 64 people or 7.4% are between 70 and 79, there are 21 people or 2.4% who are between 80 and 89, and there are 6 people or 0.7% who are 90 and older.

As of 2000, there were 314 people who were single and never married in the municipality. There were 428 married individuals, 29 widows or widowers and 42 individuals who are divorced.

As of 2000, there were 309 private households in the municipality, and an average of 2.6 persons per household. There were 60 households that consist of only one person and 24 households with five or more people. Out of a total of 314 households that answered this question, 19.1% were households made up of just one person and there was 1 adult who lived with their parents. Of the rest of the households, there are 108 married couples without children, 125 married couples with children There were 11 single parents with a child or children. There were 4 households that were made up of unrelated people and 5 households that were made up of some sort of institution or another collective housing.

In 2000 there were 163 single family homes (or 71.2% of the total) out of a total of 229 inhabited buildings. There were 44 multi-family buildings (19.2%), along with 16 multi-purpose buildings that were mostly used for housing (7.0%) and 6 other use buildings (commercial or industrial) that also had some housing (2.6%). Of the single family homes 23 were built before 1919, while 21 were built between 1990 and 2000. The greatest number of single family homes (79) were built between 1971 and 1980. The most multi-family homes (10) were built before 1919 and the next most (9) were built between 1971 and 1980. There were 4 multi-family houses built between 1996 and 2000.

In 2000 there were 315 apartments in the municipality. The most common apartment size was 4 rooms of which there were 110. There were 3 single room apartments and 132 apartments with five or more rooms. Of these apartments, a total of 300 apartments (95.2% of the total) were permanently occupied, while 12 apartments (3.8%) were seasonally occupied and 3 apartments (1.0%) were empty. As of 2009, the construction rate of new housing units was 3.5 new units per 1000 residents. The vacancy rate for the municipality, in 2010, was 0%.

The historical population is given in the following chart:

== Politics ==
In the 2007 federal election the most popular party was the SVP which received 29.77% of the vote. The next three most popular parties were the FDP (21.93%), the SP (15.03%) and the Green Party (11.84%). In the federal election, a total of 312 votes were cast, and the voter turnout was 53.8%.

== Economy ==
As of 2010, Sullens had an unemployment rate of 3.2%. As of 2008, there were 23 people employed in the primary economic sector and about 12 businesses involved in this sector. 14 people were employed in the secondary sector and there were 6 businesses in this sector. 35 people were employed in the tertiary sector, with 16 businesses in this sector. There were 414 residents of the municipality who were employed in some capacity, of which females made up 43.7% of the workforce.

In 2008 the total number of full-time equivalent jobs was 56. The number of jobs in the primary sector was 14, of which 11 were in agriculture and 3 were in forestry or lumber production. The number of jobs in the secondary sector was 13, all of which were in construction. The number of jobs in the tertiary sector was 29. In the tertiary sector; 3 or 10.3% were in wholesale or retail sales or the repair of motor vehicles, 3 or 10.3% were in the movement and storage of goods, 2 or 6.9% were in a hotel or restaurant, 5 or 17.2% were in the information industry, 4 or 13.8% were technical professionals or scientists, 4 or 13.8% were in education.

In 2000, there were 36 workers who commuted into the municipality and 327 workers who commuted away. The municipality is a net exporter of workers, with about 9.1 workers leaving the municipality for every one entering. Of the working population, 5.8% used public transportation to get to work, and 75.1% used a private car.

== Religion ==
From the 2000 census, 228 or 28.0% were Roman Catholic, while 440 or 54.1% belonged to the Swiss Reformed Church. Of the rest of the population, there were 4 members of an Orthodox church (or about 0.49% of the population), there were 2 individuals (or about 0.25% of the population) who belonged to the Christian Catholic Church, and there were 39 individuals (or about 4.80% of the population) who belonged to another Christian church. There was 1 individual who was Jewish, and 5 (or about 0.62% of the population) who were Islamic. There were 3 individuals who were Buddhist. 91 (or about 11.19% of the population) belonged to no church, are agnostic or atheist, and 15 individuals (or about 1.85% of the population) did not answer the question.

== Education ==
In Sullens about 347 or (42.7%) of the population have completed non-mandatory upper secondary education, and 143 or (17.6%) have completed additional higher education (either university or a Fachhochschule). Of the 143 who completed tertiary schooling, 61.5% were Swiss men, 24.5% were Swiss women, 8.4% were non-Swiss men and 5.6% were non-Swiss women.

In the 2009/2010 school year there were a total of 112 students in the Sullens school district. In the Vaud cantonal school system, two years of non-obligatory pre-school are provided by the political districts. During the school year, the political district provided pre-school care for a total of 296 children of which 96 children (32.4%) received subsidized pre-school care. The canton's primary school program requires students to attend for four years. There were 51 students in the municipal primary school program. The obligatory lower secondary school program lasts for six years and there were 61 students in those schools.

As of 2000, there were 32 students in Sullens who came from another municipality, while 93 residents attended schools outside the municipality.
