= Jean-Michel Tobie =

French politician (born 1948)

Jean Michel Tobie (born 6 October 1948) was the last mayor of the city of Ancenis (2001-2018) and the first mayor of the new commune of Ancenis-Saint-Géréon (2019-2020), in Loire-Atlantique, Pays de la Loire, France.

He was the president of communauté de communes du pays d'Ancenis from 2014 to 2020.
