= Essertines-sur-Yverdon =

- Municipality
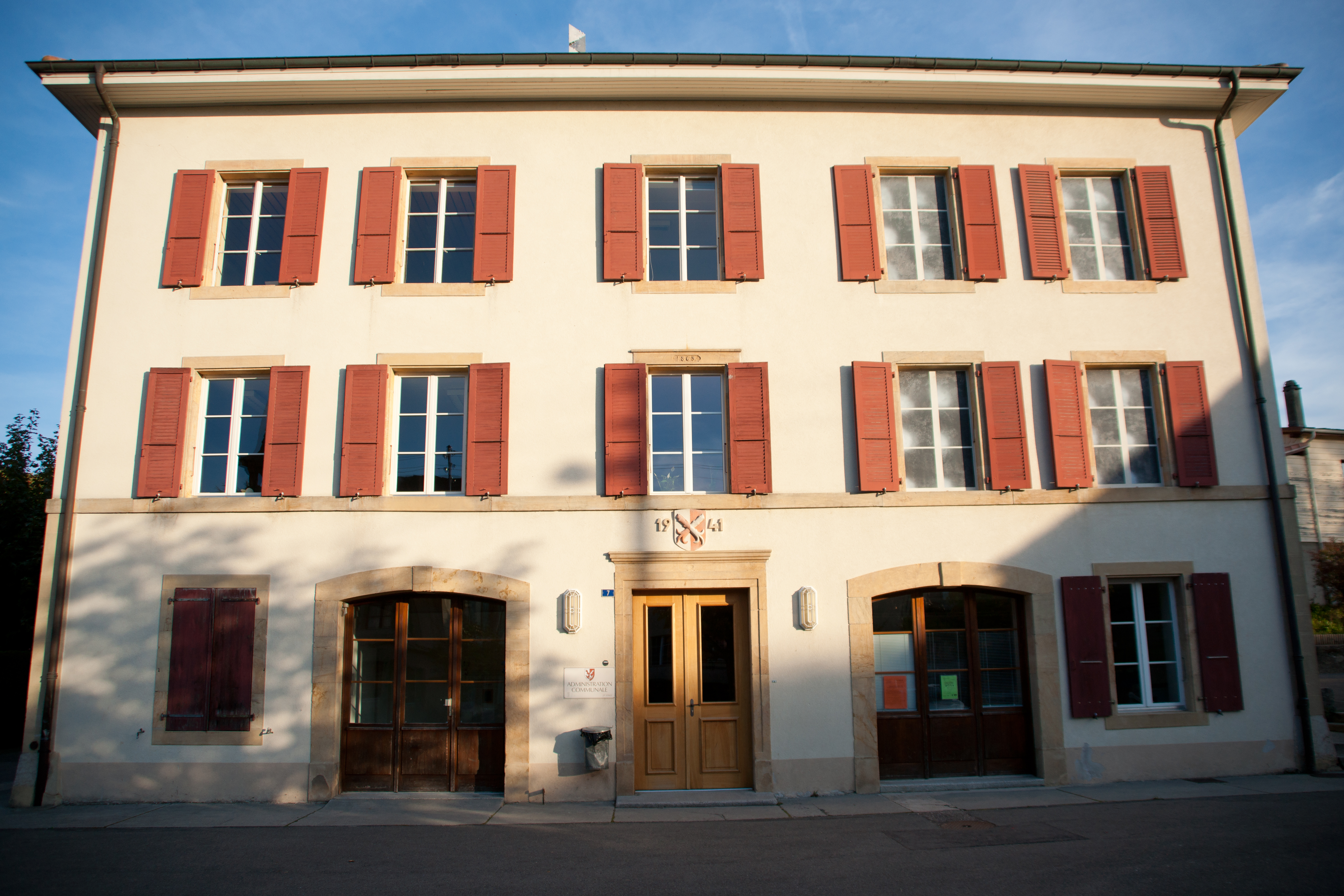
- Current town hall of Essertines-sur-Yverdon

- Flag Coat of arms
- Location of Essertines-sur-Yverdon
- Location within Switzerland Location within Canton of Vaud
- Coordinates: 46°43′N 6°38′E
- Country: Switzerland
- Canton: Vaud
- District: Gros-de-Vaud

Government
  - Mayor: Syndic

Area
  - Total: 9.75 km^{2} (3.76 sq mi)
- Elevation: 600 m (2,000 ft)

Population (December 2004)
  - Total: 698
  - Density: 71.6/km^{2} (185/sq mi)
- Time zone: UTC+01:00 (CET)
  - Summer (DST): UTC+02:00 (CEST)
- Postal code: 1417
- SFOS number: 5520
- ISO 3166 code: CH-VD
- Surrounded by: Belmont-sur-Yverdon, Corcelles-sur-Chavornay, Gressy, Orzens, Pailly, Suchy, Ursins, Valeyres-sous-Ursins, Vuarrens
- Website: https://essertines-sur-yverdon.ch Profile (in French), SFSO statistics

Essertines-sur-Yverdon (French pronunciation: [esɛʁtin syʁ ivɛʁdɔ̃], literally Essertines on Yverdon) is a municipality in the district of Gros-de-Vaud in the canton of Vaud in Switzerland.

== History ==
Essertines-sur-Yverdon is first mentioned in 1180 as Essertines.

== Geography ==
Essertines-sur-Yverdon has an area, as of 2009, of 9.75 square kilometers (3.76 sq mi). Of this area, 6.63 km^{2} (2.56 sq mi) or 68.0% is used for agricultural purposes, while 2.49 km^{2} (0.96 sq mi) or 25.5% is forested. Of the rest of the land, 0.58 km^{2} (0.22 sq mi) or 5.9% is settled (buildings or roads), 0.01 km^{2} (2.5 acres) or 0.1% is either rivers or lakes and 0.01 km^{2} (2.5 acres) or 0.1% is unproductive land.

Of the built up area, housing and buildings made up 2.8% and transportation infrastructure made up 2.9%. Out of the forested land, 24.4% of the total land area is heavily forested and 1.1% is covered with orchards or small clusters of trees. Of the agricultural land, 56.7% is used for growing crops and 10.2% is pastures, while 1.1% is used for orchards or vine crops. All the water in the municipality is flowing water.

The municipality was part of the Echallens District until it was dissolved on 31 August 2006, and Essertines-sur-Yverdon became part of the new district of Gros-de-Vaud.

The municipality is located on the right bank of the Buron river. It consists of the village of Essertines-sur-Yverdon and the hamlet of Epautheyres on the Lausanne to Yverdon-les-Bains road, as well as the hamlets Nonfoux and La Robellaz.

== Coat of arms ==
The blazon of the municipal coat of arms is Per pale Argent and Gules, two Stumps eradicated crossed in saltire counterchanged.

== Demographics ==
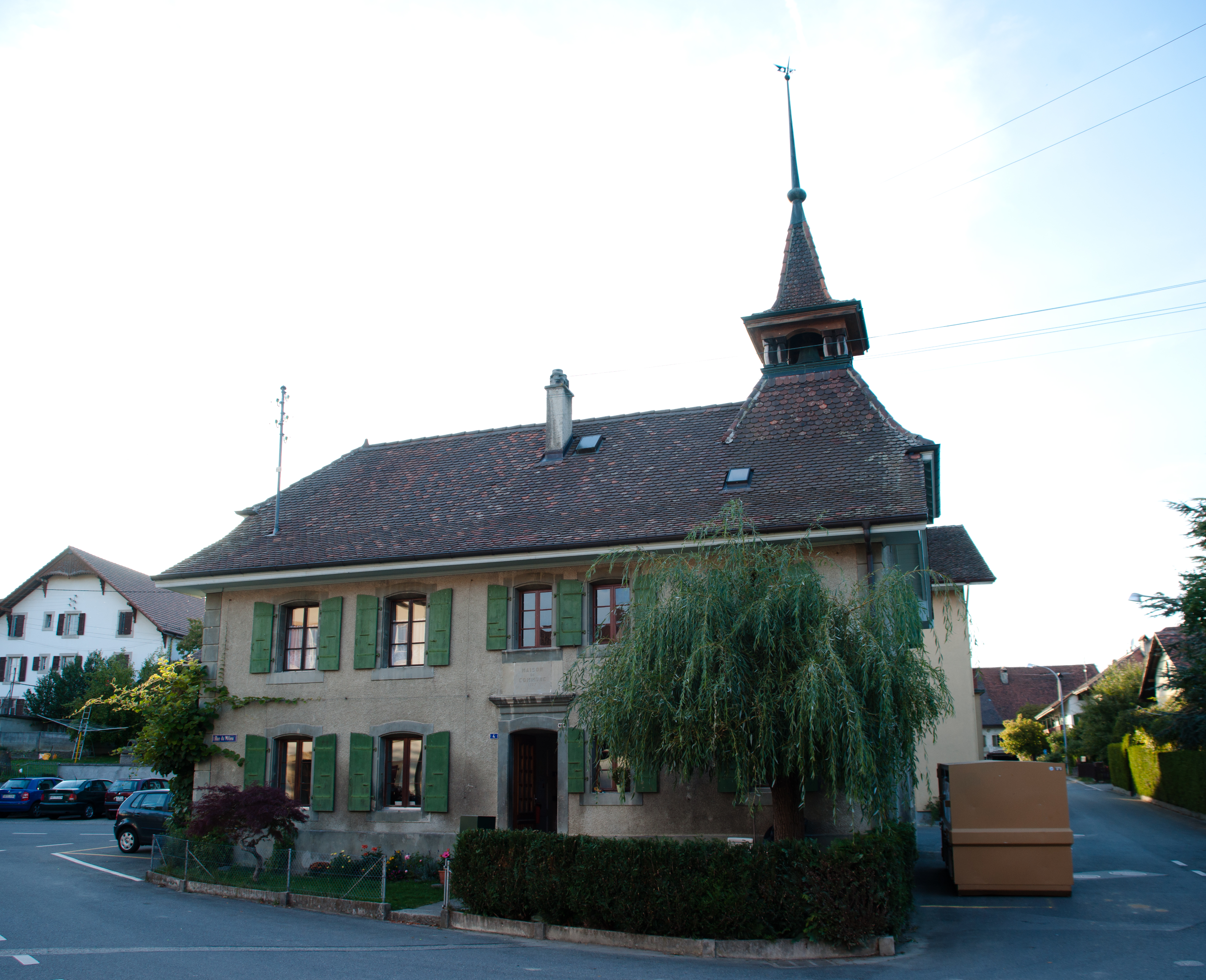
Former town hall of Essertines-sur-Yverdon

Essertines-sur-Yverdon has a population (as of December 2020) of 1,037. As of 2008, 9.0% of the population are resident foreign nationals. Over the last 10 years (1999–2009 ) the population has changed at a rate of 26.3%. It has changed at a rate of 24.5% due to migration and at a rate of 2.1% due to births and deaths.

Most of the population (as of 2000) speaks French (626 or 94.4%), with German being second most common (27 or 4.1%) and English being third (3 or 0.5%). There are 2 people who speak Italian.

Of the population in the municipality 205 or about 30.9% were born in Essertines-sur-Yverdon and lived there in 2000. There were 265 or 40.0% who were born in the same canton, while 119 or 17.9% were born somewhere else in Switzerland, and 53 or 8.0% were born outside of Switzerland.

In 2008 there were 9 live births to Swiss citizens and 1 birth to non-Swiss citizens, and in same time span there were 7 deaths of Swiss citizens and 1 non-Swiss citizen death. Ignoring immigration and emigration, the population of Swiss citizens increased by 2 while the foreign population remained the same. There were 2 Swiss women who emigrated from Switzerland. At the same time, there was 1 non-Swiss man and 3 non-Swiss women who immigrated from another country to Switzerland. The total Swiss population change in 2008 (from all sources, including moves across municipal borders) was an increase of 22 and the non-Swiss population increased by 7 people. This represents a population growth rate of 3.5%.

The age distribution, as of 2009, in Essertines-sur-Yverdon is; 125 children or 14.7% of the population are between 0 and 9 years old and 112 teenagers or 13.2% are between 10 and 19. Of the adult population, 109 people or 12.8% of the population are between 20 and 29 years old. 133 people or 15.7% are between 30 and 39, 106 people or 12.5% are between 40 and 49, and 105 people or 12.4% are between 50 and 59. The senior population distribution is 98 people or 11.5% of the population are between 60 and 69 years old, 29 people or 3.4% are between 70 and 79, there are 24 people or 2.8% who are between 80 and 89, and there are 8 people or 0.9% who are 90 and older.

As of 2000, there were 250 people who were single and never married in the municipality. There were 341 married individuals, 32 widows or widowers and 40 individuals who are divorced.

As of 2000, there were 247 private households in the municipality, and an average of 2.6 persons per household. There were 51 households that consist of only one person and 24 households with five or more people. Out of a total of 252 households that answered this question, 20.2% were households made up of just one person and there were 4 adults who lived with their parents. Of the rest of the households, there are 79 married couples without children, 94 married couples with children There were 12 single parents with a child or children. There were 7 households that were made up of unrelated people and 5 households that were made up of some sort of institution or another collective housing.

In 2000 there were 108 single family homes (or 55.7% of the total) out of a total of 194 inhabited buildings. There were 26 multi-family buildings (13.4%), along with 52 multi-purpose buildings that were mostly used for housing (26.8%) and 8 other use buildings (commercial or industrial) that also had some housing (4.1%). Of the single family homes 44 were built before 1919, while 10 were built between 1990 and 2000. The most multi-family homes (14) were built before 1919 and the next most (4) were built between 1919 and 1945. There was 1 multi-family house built between 1996 and 2000.

In 2000 there were 257 apartments in the municipality. The most common apartment size was 3 rooms of which there were 60. There were 6 single room apartments and 119 apartments with five or more rooms. Of these apartments, a total of 234 apartments (91.1% of the total) were permanently occupied, while 18 apartments (7.0%) were seasonally occupied and 5 apartments (1.9%) were empty. As of 2009, the construction rate of new housing units was 0 new units per 1000 residents. The vacancy rate for the municipality, in 2010, was 0.67%.

The historical population is given in the following chart:

== Sights ==
The entire village of Essertines-sur-Yverdon is designated as part of the Inventory of Swiss Heritage Sites.

== Politics ==
In the 2007 federal election the most popular party was the SVP which received 40.19% of the vote. The next three most popular parties were the SP (18.19%), the Green Party (10.16%) and the CVP (7.72%). In the federal election, a total of 243 votes were cast, and the voter turnout was 42.9%.

== Economy ==
As of 2010, Essertines-sur-Yverdon had an unemployment rate of 4.8%. As of 2008, there were 45 people employed in the primary economic sector and about 19 businesses involved in this sector. 40 people were employed in the secondary sector and there were 10 businesses in this sector. 71 people were employed in the tertiary sector, with 20 businesses in this sector. There were 323 residents of the municipality who were employed in some capacity, of which females made up 41.5% of the workforce.

In 2008 the total number of full-time equivalent jobs was 128. The number of jobs in the primary sector was 35, all of which were in agriculture. The number of jobs in the secondary sector was 34 of which 18 or (52.9%) were in manufacturing and 16 (47.1%) were in construction. The number of jobs in the tertiary sector was 59. In the tertiary sector; 32 or 54.2% were in wholesale or retail sales or the repair of motor vehicles, 10 or 16.9% were in the movement and storage of goods, 4 or 6.8% were in a hotel or restaurant, 5 or 8.5% were technical professionals or scientists, 4 or 6.8% were in education.

In 2000, there were 36 workers who commuted into the municipality and 217 workers who commuted away. The municipality is a net exporter of workers, with about 6.0 workers leaving the municipality for every one entering. Of the working population, 5% used public transportation to get to work, and 68.1% used a private car.

== Religion ==
From the 2000 census, 107 or 16.1% were Roman Catholic, while 405 or 61.1% belonged to the Swiss Reformed Church. Of the rest of the population, there was 1 member of an Orthodox church, and there were 84 individuals (or about 12.67% of the population) who belonged to another Christian church. There were 2 (or about 0.30% of the population) who were Islamic. There were 1 individual who belonged to another church. 81 (or about 12.22% of the population) belonged to no church, are agnostic or atheist, and 24 individuals (or about 3.62% of the population) did not answer the question.

== Education ==
In Essertines-sur-Yverdon about 251 or (37.9%) of the population have completed non-mandatory upper secondary education, and 87 or (13.1%) have completed additional higher education (either university or a Fachhochschule). Of the 87 who completed tertiary schooling, 63.2% were Swiss men, 25.3% were Swiss women, 9.2% were non-Swiss men.

In the 2009/2010 school year there were a total of 129 students in the Essertines-sur-Yverdon school district. In the Vaud cantonal school system, two years of non-obligatory pre-school are provided by the political districts. During the school year, the political district provided pre-school care for a total of 296 children of which 96 children (32.4%) received subsidized pre-school care. The canton's primary school program requires students to attend for four years. There were 72 students in the municipal primary school program. The obligatory lower secondary school program lasts for six years and there were 57 students in those schools.

As of 2000, there were 25 students in Essertines-sur-Yverdon who came from another municipality, while 88 residents attended schools outside the municipality.
