= Bernard du Boucheron =

French writer (1928–2024)

- Born: 18 July 1928; Paris, France
- Died: 6 July 2024 (aged 95); Neuilly-sur-Seine, France
- Occupation: Writer

Bernard du Boucheron (18 July 1928 – 6 July 2024) was a French writer. Du Boucheron died in Neuilly-sur-Seine on 6 July 2024, at the age of 95.

== Awards ==
- 2004 Grand Prix du roman de l'Académie française for his first novel Court Serpent (Gallimard).
- 2010 Impac Dublin award

== Bibliography ==
- Court serpent, Gallimard, 2004, ISBN 978-2-07-077125-7
  - The Voyage of the Short Serpent: a novel, Translated Hester Velmans, Overlook Press, 2008, ISBN 978-1-58567-920-1
- Un Roi, une princesse et une pieuvre, (a king, a princess and an octopus.) Gallimard Jeunesse, 2005, ISBN 978-2-07-057094-2
- Coup-de-Fouet, (Whiplash) Gallimard, 2006.
- Chien des Os, (Dog of the Bones) Gallimard, 2007.
- Vue Mer, (Seaside View) Gallimard, 2009.
- Salaam la France, Gallimard, 2010.
- Mauvais signe, Gallimard, coll. « Blanche », 2012 ISBN 9782070136360
- Long-courrier, Gallimard, coll. « Blanche », 2013 ISBN 9782070140404
- Le Cauchemar de Winston, Éditions du Rocher, 190 p., 2014 ISBN 9782268076027
- La Guerre en Vacances, Éditions du Rocher, 258 p., 2016
