= Jean-Michel Boucheron =

Jean-Michel Boucheron is the name of:

- Jean-Michel Boucheron (Ille-et-Vilaine politician) (born 1948), member of the National Assembly of France, from Ille-et-Vilaine
- Jean-Michel Boucheron (Charente politician) (born 1946), member of the National Assembly of France, from Charente
