= Goumoens =

Goumoens may refer to:

- The village of Goumoens-le-Jux in the Canton of Vaud, Switzerland
- The village of Goumoens-la-Ville in the Canton of Vaud, Switzerland
- The municipality of Goumoëns which was formed by the merger of Goumoens-le-Jux and Goumoens-la-Ville in the Canton of Vaud, Switzerland
- Goumoens-le-Châtel, the former name of Saint-Barthélemy, Canton of Vaud, Switzerland
- The Goumoëns family, a noble family from Vaud, Switzerland
