= Goumoëns family =

Noble family from Vaud, Switzerland

The Goumoëns family (in French de Goumoëns, in German von Goumoëns) is a noble family from Vaud that still exists. It takes its name from the castle of Goumoens-le-Châtel and is first recorded at the end of the 11th century. Its possessions came under Bernese rule in 1475, and the family later became part of the patriciate of Bern.

== History ==
The Goumoëns take their name from the castle of Goumoens-le-Châtel, in the municipality of Saint-Barthélemy, and appear in the records at the end of the 11th century: in 1097 Petrus de Gumoens et Conon de eodem castro witnessed an agreement between the abbey of Romainmôtier and a lord from Franche-Comté. Their origin is obscure. A tradition begun at the time of the Revolution by the genealogist Jean-Louis d'Estavayer makes them a cadet branch of the lords of Grandson. Their fiefs were scattered across the region of Échallens, notably in the villages of Goumoens-la-Ville, Goumoens-le-Jux, and Saint-Barthélemy.

The Goumoëns were vassals of the bishop of Lausanne and of the Grandson, Cossonay, and above all Montfaucon families. They were benefactors and later advocates of Montheron Abbey, where they were buried, and at times episcopal bailiffs of Lausanne or castellans of Orbe on behalf of the Montfaucon. Their position only really improved after Jacques married Agnès de Corbières, heiress of the lordship of Bioley-Magnoux, in the second half of the 14th century. From then on, their marriages brought them closer to important families (d'Estavayer, Menthon, d'Allinges).

For their possessions in the bailiwick of Échallens, they came under Bernese rule in 1475, and they accepted the Reformation without apparent reluctance. With François (1519?–before 16 January 1600), the family joined the patriciate of Bern through marriages with the Bonstetten, Erlach, and Luternau families, and in 1632, with Jérémie (1596–1654), it was admitted to the burghership (Burgergemeinde) of Bern. The advantages of this integration into the ruling elite were only felt in the 18th century: Jean-Baptiste (1658–1720) entered the Grand Council in 1701 and obtained the bailiwick of Échallens in 1710, and his son Sigismond Emanuel Jérôme (1702–1777) became bailiff of Avenches in 1740. Their status as burghers of Bern also eased careers in foreign service, and so allowed Jacques François to acquire a regiment in Dutch service in 1722.

During the Revolution, the disputes of Louis Vincent (1760–1839), a landowner at Goumoens-la-Ville, with the Bourla-Papey illustrate the tensions between peasants and former lords during the dismantling of the Ancien Régime. His debt-laden affairs also gave the family fund (Familienkiste), founded in 1789, many occasions to intervene. While the Goumoëns settled in the canton of Vaud stayed away from political and administrative office, those of Bern continued to hold posts in the Bernese administration in the 19th century: Charles Frédéric Victor (1792–1843) was bailiff of Aarwangen, and Emanuel Samuel Bernard (1796–1860) prefect (Regierungsstatthalter) of Thun. Several still served in foreign armies, among them Nicolas Emmanuel Frédéric and Gustave. From the turn of the 20th century, the Goumoëns turned to the liberal professions (engineer, architect, physician).

== Bibliography ==
- Almanach généalogique suisse, 4, 228–232, 857–865
- M. Reymond, "De l'origine de la famille de Goumoëns", in Recueil de généalogies vaudoises, 2, 1935, 291–317
- G. Castelnuovo, Seigneurs et lignages dans le Pays de Vaud, 1994, 67–69 (Italian edition: L'aristocrazia del Vaud fino alla conquista sabauda, 1990, 93–96)

=== Archives ===
- Family archives, Archives cantonales vaudoises, Chavannes-près-Renens
