= François-Louis de Pesmes de Saint-Saphorin =

Swiss diplomat and military officer (1668–1737)

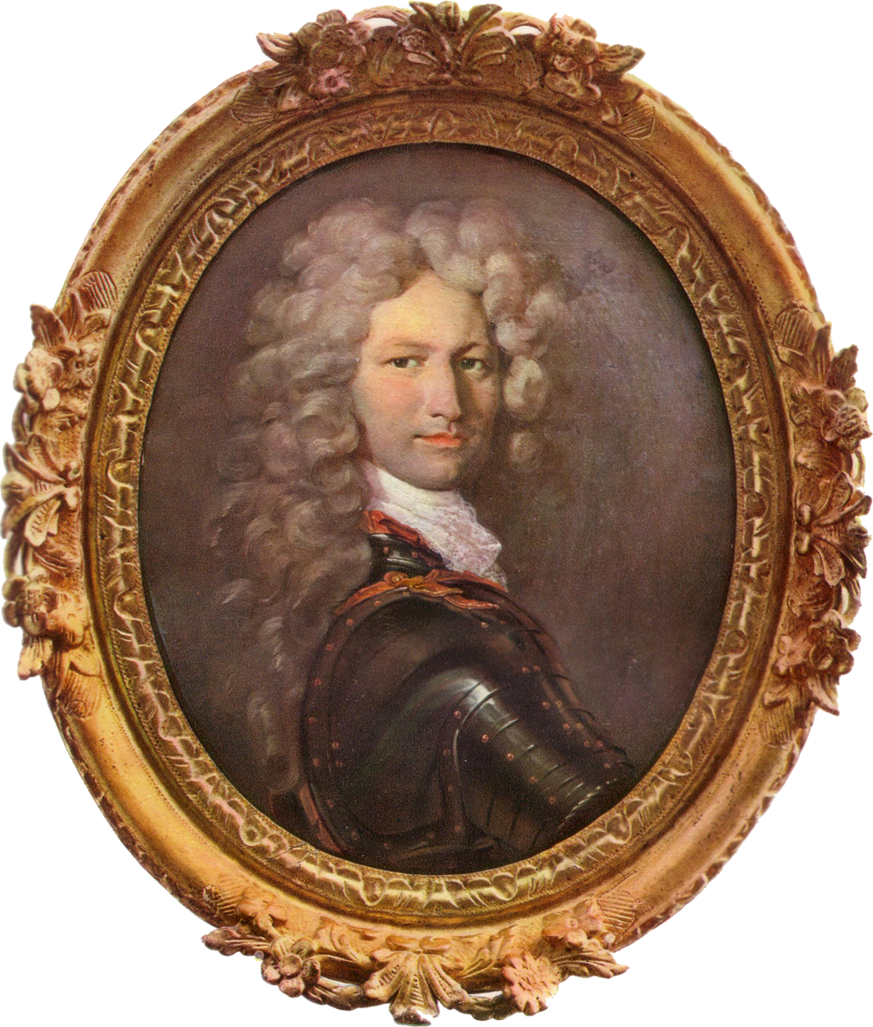
- Born: February 1668; Château de Saint-Saphorin-sur-Morges
- Died: July 16, 1737 (aged 69); Château de Saint-Saphorin
- Occupations: Military officer, diplomat
- Spouse: Esther Darbonnier
- Relatives: Jacques François de Goumoëns (brother-in-law)

François-Louis de Pesmes de Saint-Saphorin (February 1668 – 16 July 1737) was a Swiss military officer and diplomat from Geneva who served the Dutch Republic, the Holy Roman Empire, and the Kingdom of Great Britain. He played a notable role in Swiss foreign policy during the War of the Spanish Succession and later represented George I as resident at the imperial court in Vienna.

== Life and career ==
Born in February 1668 at the château of Saint-Saphorin-sur-Morges, Pesmes de Saint-Saphorin was the son of Isaac, co-lord of Saint-Saphorin, and Elisabeth Rolaz. He married Esther Darbonnier, daughter of Louis-Frédéric, lord of Dizy, and was the brother-in-law of Jacques François de Goumoëns. He served in the Dutch infantry from 1685 to 1688 and, from 1692, in the imperial Danube fleet in Hungary, becoming vice-admiral in 1695 and commanding at the Battle of Zenta (1697), Prince Eugene's victory over the Turks. He was promoted to colonel of infantry in 1702 and major-general in 1705.

=== Diplomatic service ===
During the War of the Spanish Succession, Pesmes de Saint-Saphorin held a dual diplomatic role, though without official mandate, as imperial agent in Switzerland—alongside the Austrian envoy Franz Ehrenreich von Trauttmansdorff—and as envoy of the Protestant cantons at the court of Vienna; he was tasked with winning the Confederates over to the allied cause. In 1707–1708 he helped transfer the Principality of Neuchâtel to the king of Prussia, in the interest of Bern. In 1712 he concluded on Bern's behalf a defensive alliance and a military capitulation with the United Provinces. He represented the Protestant cantons at the negotiations of the Treaty of Utrecht (1713) and at those of the Peace of Baden (1714), officially as envoy of Hanover.

=== Service to Great Britain ===
Pesmes de Saint-Saphorin served King George I as lieutenant-general (1715) and then as resident at the court of Vienna (1717–1727), where he revived his friendship with Prince Eugene and, in 1718, helped bring about the Quadruple Alliance (England, France, Austria, and the United Provinces) against Spain. From Saint-Saphorin, where he retired, he maintained an extensive correspondence in which he continued to advocate the alliance between London and Vienna against Bourbon hegemony and Catholic universalism. He died at the château of Saint-Saphorin on 16 July 1737.

== Bibliography ==
- A. Lätt, "Zwei schweizerische Diplomaten im Dienste Grossbritanniens", in Basler Zeitschrift für Geschichte und Altertumskunde, 21, 1923, 127–157.
- S. Stelling-Michaud, Saint-Saphorin et la politique de la Suisse pendant la guerre de Succession d'Espagne (1700–1710), 1934.
- T. Gehling, Ein europäischer Diplomat am Kaiserhof zu Wien, 1964.

=== Archives ===
- Fonds de Mestral, Archives cantonales vaudoises (ACV).
