= Nicolas Théodore de Goumoëns =

Swiss officer in Dutch service (1730–1800)

- Born: 8 March 1730
- Died: 8 February 1800 (aged 69); Orbe, Switzerland
- Spouse: Susanne-Sabine Couvreu de Deckersberg
- Military career
- Allegiance: Dutch Republic
- Rank: Major general

Nicolas Théodore de Goumoëns (8 March 1730 – 8 February 1800) was a Swiss officer in Dutch service who became a major general and governor of the province of Friesland.

== Biography ==
Goumoëns was the son of Louis Frédéric de Goumoëns, a major in Dutch service, and Elisabeth de Pesmes, daughter of Isaac, lord of Saint-Saphorin. He was a grandson of Jacques François de Goumoëns. He married Susanne-Sabine Couvreu de Deckersberg, daughter of Jean-Louis, an assessor at the bailiwick court of Vevey (Vogteirichter). His daughter Marie Anne Sophie was the mother of Nicolas Emmanuel Frédéric de Goumoëns.

He entered Dutch service at a young age. In 1788 he became colonel-proprietor (Inhaber) of the Bernese regiment of Stürler, and in 1790 a brigadier. He took part in the campaign of 1793 against the French, and in 1794 he became a major general and governor of the province of Friesland. The French occupation of the Netherlands ended his political career, and from 1796 he lived in retirement at Orbe. From 1775 to 1798 he was a member of the Council of Two Hundred of Bern.
