= Goumoëns =

- Municipality
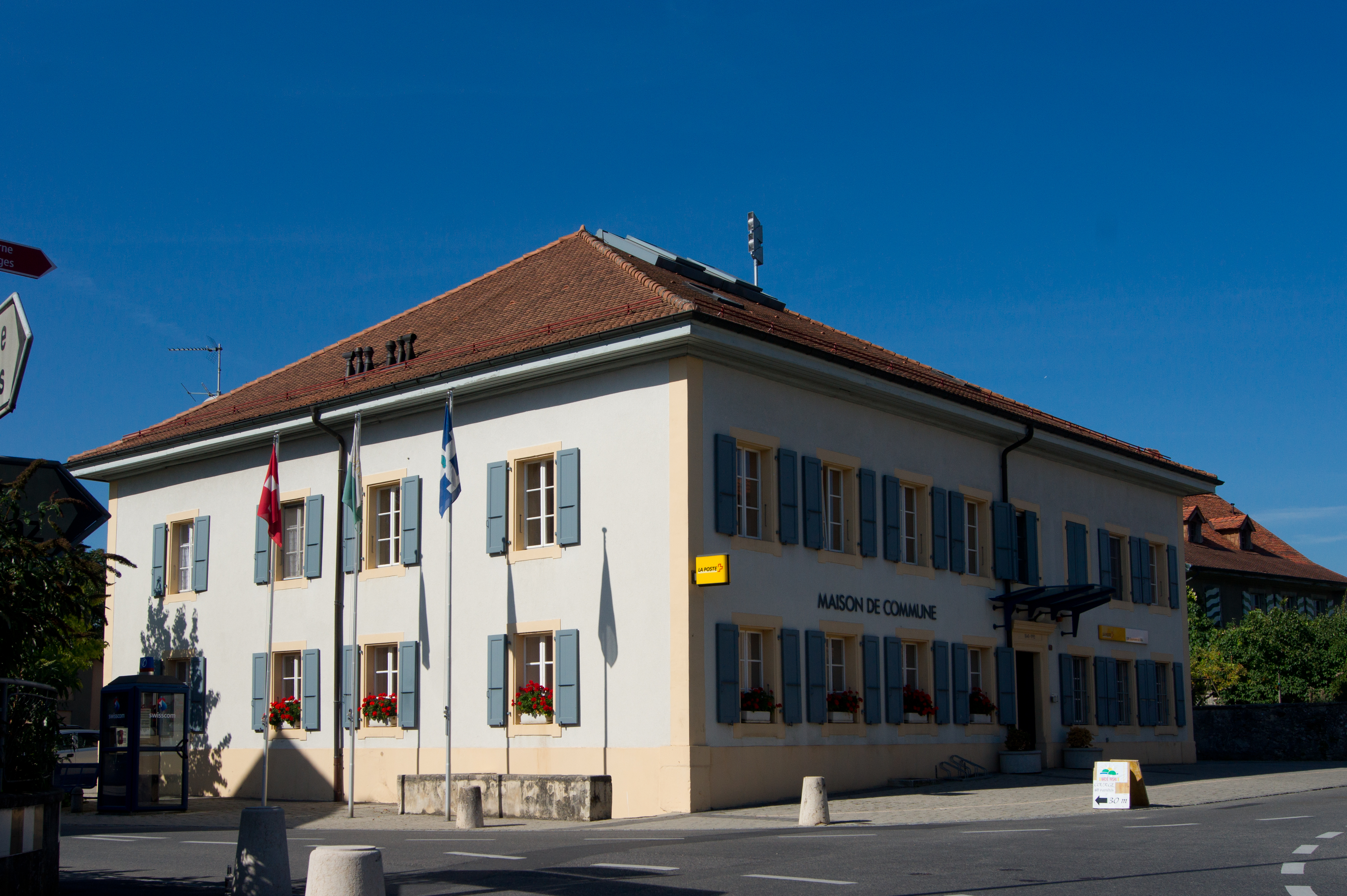
- Goumoens-la-Ville town hall

- Flag Coat of arms
- Location of Goumoëns
- Location within Switzerland Location within Canton of Vaud
- Coordinates: 46°39′N 6°36′E
- Country: Switzerland
- Canton: Vaud
- District: Gros-de-Vaud

Government
  - Mayor: Syndic

Area
  - Total: 13.9 km^{2} (5.4 sq mi)

Population (December 2009)
  - Total: 650
  - Density: 47/km^{2} (120/sq mi)
- Time zone: UTC+01:00 (CET)
  - Summer (DST): UTC+02:00 (CEST)
- SFOS number: 5541
- ISO 3166 code: CH-VD
- Surrounded by: Échallens, Penthéréaz, Saint-Barthélemy, Villars-le-Terroir
- Website: https://www.goumoens.ch Profile (in French), SFSO statistics

Goumoëns is a municipality in the district of Gros-de-Vaud in the canton of Vaud in Switzerland.

The municipalities of Éclagnens, Goumoens-la-Ville and Goumoens-le-Jux merged on 1 July 2011 into the new municipality of Goumoëns.

== History ==
Éclagnens is first mentioned in 1265 as de Clanens. Goumoens-la-Ville is first mentioned in 1228 as Guimuens li vila. Goumoens-le-Jux is first mentioned in 1447 as Gumoens lo Jux. During the Ancien Régime it was known as Le Craux.

== Geography ==
Goumoëns has an area, as of 2009, of 13.89 square kilometers (5.36 mi^{2}). Of this area, 9.41 km^{2} (3.63 mi^{2}) or 67.7% is used for agricultural purposes, while 3.36 km^{2} (1.30 mi^{2}) or 24.2% is forested. Of the rest of the land, 0.96 km^{2} (0.37 mi^{2}) or 6.9% is settled (buildings or roads), 0.04 km^{2} (9.9 acres) or 0.3% is either rivers or lakes and 0.01 km^{2} (2.5 acres) or 0.1% is unproductive land.

== Historic population ==
The historical population is given in the following chart:
