= Bettens =

- Municipality
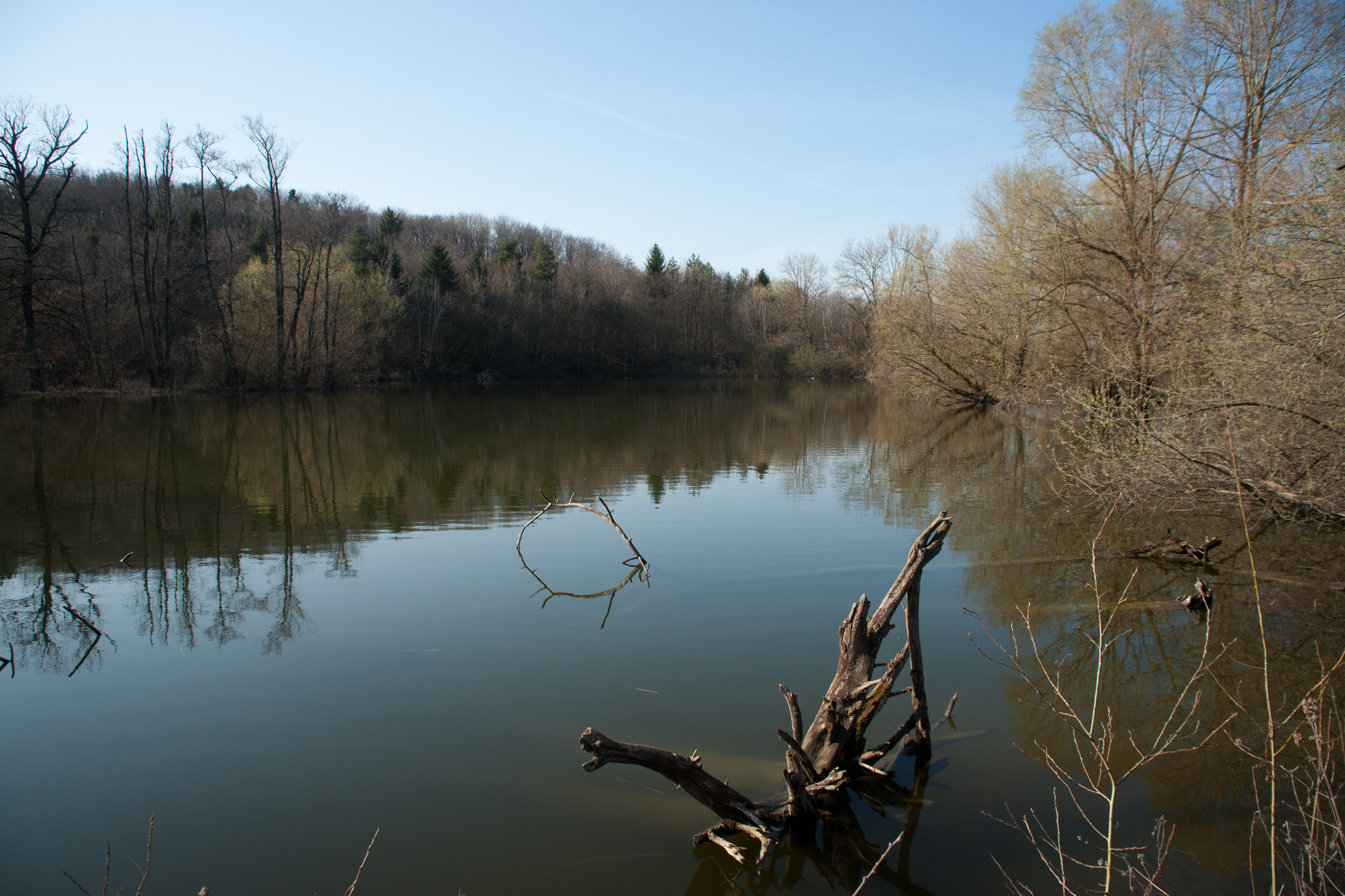

- Flag Coat of arms
- Location of Bettens
- Location within Switzerland Location within Canton of Vaud
- Coordinates: 46°38′N 06°35′E
- Country: Switzerland
- Canton: Vaud
- District: Gros-de-Vaud

Government
  - Mayor: Syndic; Jean-Daniel Reymond

Area
  - Total: 3.75 km^{2} (1.45 sq mi)
- Elevation: 583 m (1,913 ft)

Population (2004)
  - Total: 288
  - Density: 76.8/km^{2} (199/sq mi)
- Demonym(s): Les Grands-Pantets; Les Rufians
- Time zone: UTC+01:00 (CET)
  - Summer (DST): UTC+02:00 (CEST)
- Postal code: 1042
- SFOS number: 5471
- ISO 3166 code: CH-VD
- Surrounded by: Oulens-sous-Échallens, Saint-Barthélemy, Bioley-Orjulaz, Boussens, Bournens, Daillens
- Website: http://www.commune-bettens.ch Profile (in French), SFSO statistics

For people with the surname, see Bettens (surname).

Bettens is a municipality in the district of Gros-de-Vaud in the canton of Vaud in Switzerland.

== History ==
Bettens is first mentioned in 1141 as Betanis. In 1149 it was mentioned as Bectens.

== Geography ==
Bettens has an area, as of 2009, of 3.75 square kilometers (1.45 sq mi). Of this area, 2.73 km^{2} (1.05 sq mi) or 72.8% is used for agricultural purposes, while 0.55 km^{2} (0.21 sq mi) or 14.7% is forested. Of the rest of the land, 0.46 km^{2} (0.18 sq mi) or 12.3% is settled (buildings or roads), 0.01 km^{2} (2.5 acres) or 0.3% is either rivers or lakes.

Of the built up area, housing and buildings made up 3.2% and transportation infrastructure made up 4.3%. Power and water infrastructure as well as other special developed areas made up 4.8% of the area Out of the forested land, 13.3% of the total land area is heavily forested and 1.3% is covered with orchards or small clusters of trees. Of the agricultural land, 58.1% is used for growing crops and 13.3% is pastures, while 1.3% is used for orchards or vine crops. All the water in the municipality is in lakes.

The municipality was part of the Cossonay District until it was dissolved on 31 August 2006, and Bettens became part of the new district of Gros-de-Vaud.

The municipality is located east of the Venoge river.

== Coat of arms ==
The blazon of the municipal coat of arms is Per pale Argent and Gules, an annulet counterchanged.

== Demographics ==
Bettens has a population (as of December 2020) of 637. As of 2008, 9.8% of the population are resident foreign nationals. Over the last 10 years (1999–2009) the population has changed at a rate of 16.1%. It has changed at a rate of 8.4% due to migration and at a rate of 8% due to births and deaths.

Most of the population (as of 2000) speaks French (311 or 94.2%), with German being second most common (14 or 4.2%) and Italian being third (4 or 1.2%).

Of the population in the municipality 99 or about 30.0% were born in Bettens and lived there in 2000. There were 147 or 44.5% who were born in the same canton, while 41 or 12.4% were born somewhere else in Switzerland, and 37 or 11.2% were born outside of Switzerland.

In 2008 there was 1 live birth to Swiss citizens and 1 death of a Swiss citizen. Ignoring immigration and emigration, the population of Swiss citizens remained the same while the foreign population remained the same. The total Swiss population change in 2008 (from all sources, including moves across municipal borders) was an increase of 3 and the non-Swiss population decreased by 5 people. This represents a population growth rate of -0.6%.

The age distribution, as of 2009, in Bettens is; 46 children or 13.3% of the population are between 0 and 9 years old and 61 teenagers or 17.6% are between 10 and 19. Of the adult population, 32 people or 9.2% of the population are between 20 and 29 years old. 44 people or 12.7% are between 30 and 39, 82 people or 23.7% are between 40 and 49, and 38 people or 11.0% are between 50 and 59. The senior population distribution is 22 people or 6.4% of the population are between 60 and 69 years old, 10 people or 2.9% are between 70 and 79, there are 10 people or 2.9% who are between 80 and 89, and there is 1 person who is 90 and older.

As of 2000, there were 155 people who were single and never married in the municipality. There were 161 married individuals, 6 widows or widowers and 8 individuals who are divorced.

As of 2000, there were 112 private households in the municipality, and an average of 2.8 persons per household. There were 24 households that consist of only one person and 10 households with five or more people. Out of a total of 116 households that answered this question, 20.7% were households made up of just one person and there was 1 adult who lived with their parents. Of the rest of the households, there are 28 married couples without children, 48 married couples with children There were 9 single parents with a child or children. There were 2 households that were made up of unrelated people and 4 households that were made up of some sort of institution or another collective housing.

In 2000 there were 47 single family homes (or 56.0% of the total) out of a total of 84 inhabited buildings. There were 13 multi-family buildings (15.5%), along with 19 multi-purpose buildings that were mostly used for housing (22.6%) and 5 other use buildings (commercial or industrial) that also had some housing (6.0%). Of the single family homes 11 were built before 1919, while 19 were built between 1990 and 2000. The most multi-family homes (6) were built before 1919 and the next most (2) were built between 1981 and 1990. There was 1 multi-family house built between 1996 and 2000.

In 2000 there were 120 apartments in the municipality. The most common apartment size was 5 rooms of which there were 27. There were 4 single room apartments and 56 apartments with five or more rooms. Of these apartments, a total of 108 apartments (90.0% of the total) were permanently occupied, while 11 apartments (9.2%) were seasonally occupied and one apartment was empty. As of 2009, the construction rate of new housing units was 2.9 new units per 1000 residents. The vacancy rate for the municipality, in 2010, was 0%.

The historical population is given in the following chart:

== Politics ==
In the 2007 federal election the most popular party was the SVP which received 31.2% of the vote. The next three most popular parties were the FDP (17.43%), the Green Party (15.32%) and the SP (14.45%). In the federal election, a total of 98 votes were cast, and the voter turnout was 46.0%.

== Economy ==
As of 2010, Bettens had an unemployment rate of 2.4%. As of 2008, there were 29 people employed in the primary economic sector and about 13 businesses involved in this sector. 9 people were employed in the secondary sector and there were 4 businesses in this sector. 12 people were employed in the tertiary sector, with 6 businesses in this sector. There were 177 residents of the municipality who were employed in some capacity, of which females made up 42.4% of the workforce.

In 2008 the total number of full-time equivalent jobs was 37. The number of jobs in the primary sector was 19, of which 17 were in agriculture and 2 were in forestry or lumber production. The number of jobs in the secondary sector was 6 of which 3 or (50.0%) were in manufacturing and 2 (33.3%) were in construction. The number of jobs in the tertiary sector was 12. In the tertiary sector; 8 or 66.7% were in wholesale or retail sales or the repair of motor vehicles, 2 or 16.7% were in a hotel or restaurant, 2 or 16.7% were technical professionals or scientists.

In 2000, there were 12 workers who commuted into the municipality and 129 workers who commuted away. The municipality is a net exporter of workers, with about 10.8 workers leaving the municipality for every one entering. Of the working population, 7.9% used public transportation to get to work, and 66.7% used a private car.

== Religion ==
From the 2000 census, 82 or 24.8% were Roman Catholic, while 188 or 57.0% belonged to the Swiss Reformed Church. Of the rest of the population, and there were 8 individuals (or about 2.42% of the population) who belonged to another Christian church. There was 1 individual who was Islamic. 39 (or about 11.82% of the population) belonged to no church, are agnostic or atheist, and 12 individuals (or about 3.64% of the population) did not answer the question.

== Education ==
In Bettens about 124 or (37.6%) of the population have completed non-mandatory upper secondary education, and 51 or (15.5%) have completed additional higher education (either university or a Fachhochschule). Of the 51 who completed tertiary schooling, 52.9% were Swiss men, 25.5% were Swiss women, 9.8% were non-Swiss men and 11.8% were non-Swiss women.

In the 2009/2010 school year there were a total of 51 students in the Bettens school district. In the Vaud cantonal school system, two years of non-obligatory pre-school are provided by the political districts. During the school year, the political district provided pre-school care for a total of 296 children of which 96 children (32.4%) received subsidized pre-school care. The canton's primary school program requires students to attend for four years. There were 27 students in the municipal primary school program. The obligatory lower secondary school program lasts for six years and there were 23 students in those schools. There were also 1 students who were home schooled or attended another non-traditional school.

As of 2000, there were 6 students in Bettens who came from another municipality, while 41 residents attended schools outside the municipality.
