= Nicolas Emmanuel Frédéric de Goumoëns =

Swiss officer in foreign service (1790–1832)

- Born: 19 April 1790; Orbe, Switzerland
- Died: 29 December 1832 (aged 42); Antwerp
- Military career
- Allegiance: Austria; Britain; Switzerland; Netherlands
- Rank: Colonel
- Conflicts: Siege of Antwerp (1832)

Nicolas Emmanuel Frédéric de Goumoëns, in German Niklaus Emanuel Friedrich von Goumoëns (19 April 1790 – 29 December 1832), was a Swiss officer who served in the Austrian, British, and Dutch armies. He was killed in the defense of the citadel of Antwerp in 1832.

== Biography ==
Goumoëns was a member of the Goumoëns family. He was the son of Sigismond Emmanuel de Goumoëns, an officer in foreign service and landowner who was murdered in March 1798, and Marie Anne Sophie née de Goumoëns, daughter of Nicolas Théodore de Goumoëns. He did not marry.

After his father's death he was brought up by Niklaus Friedrich von Mülinen, who sent him to study engineering at the imperial engineering school (kaiserliche Ingenieurschule) in Vienna. A vehement opponent of Napoleon, in 1805 he entered Austrian service in the regiment of the Prince of Ligne. In 1810 he accompanied Archduke Ferdinand into exile in Spain, where he distinguished himself fighting against France. He then served in Italy as a lieutenant colonel in British service.

In 1815 he returned to Switzerland, where he was chief of staff of the 1st Division. From 1816 he was in Dutch service, and as a colonel of the general staff he was killed in December 1832 in the defense of the citadel of Antwerp during the siege.

== Bibliography ==
- Sammlung bernischer Biographien, 5, 1906, 191–197
- B. von Rodt, Genealogien burgerlicher Geschlechter der Stadt Bern, 2, 174 (manuscript, 1950, Burgerbibliothek Bern)
- Der Schweizerische Generalstab, 3, 75
