= Gustav von Goumoëns =

Swiss officer in Austro-Hungarian service (1844–1924)

- Born: 14 October 1844; Bern, Switzerland
- Died: 26 June 1924 (aged 79); Budapest, Hungary
- Spouses: Marguerite Isaure Anne Marie Lucie de Godart du Planty (m. 1876; div. 1884) Aranka Elisabeth Aloisia von Thuróczy (m. 1899)
- Military career
- Allegiance: Habsburg monarchy
- Service years: 1865–1906
- Rank: Feldmarschall-Leutnant
- Commands: 12th Uhlan Regiment; 1st Infantry Brigade

Gustav von Goumoëns, in French Gustave de Goumoëns (14 October 1844 – 26 June 1924), was a Swiss officer in the service of the Habsburg monarchy, in which he reached the rank of lieutenant field marshal (Feldmarschall-Leutnant).

== Biography ==
Gustav von Goumoëns was a member of the Goumoëns family. He was the son of Emanuel Samuel Bernhard von Goumoëns, a captain in Dutch service, member of the Grand Council and prefect (Regierungsstatthalter) in Thun, and Marie Antoinette von Tavel. In 1876 he married Marguerite Isaure Anne Marie Lucie de Godart du Planty, daughter of Julius Alexander; they divorced in 1884. In 1899 he married Aranka Elisabeth Aloisia von Thuróczy, daughter of Stephan Linzbauer.

He had a brilliant military career in the Habsburg monarchy. He joined the cavalry in 1865 and attended the war college (Kriegsschule) from 1878 to 1880. He became a captain in 1884, a major in 1886, and a colonel in 1891. From 1891 to 1897 he commanded the 12th Uhlan Regiment, and from 1897 he commanded the 1st Infantry Brigade with the rank of major general. In 1901 he became a lieutenant field marshal, the rank with which he retired in 1906. In 1891 he was appointed imperial-royal chamberlain (k.k. Kämmerer). He died in Budapest in 1924.

== Bibliography ==
- B. von Rodt, Genealogien burgerlicher Geschlechter der Stadt Bern, 2, 176 (manuscript, 1950, Burgerbibliothek Bern)

=== Archives ===
- Austrian State Archives, Vienna, War Archives (Kriegsarchiv), qualification lists (Qualifikationslisten)
