= Oulens-sous-Échallens =

- Municipality
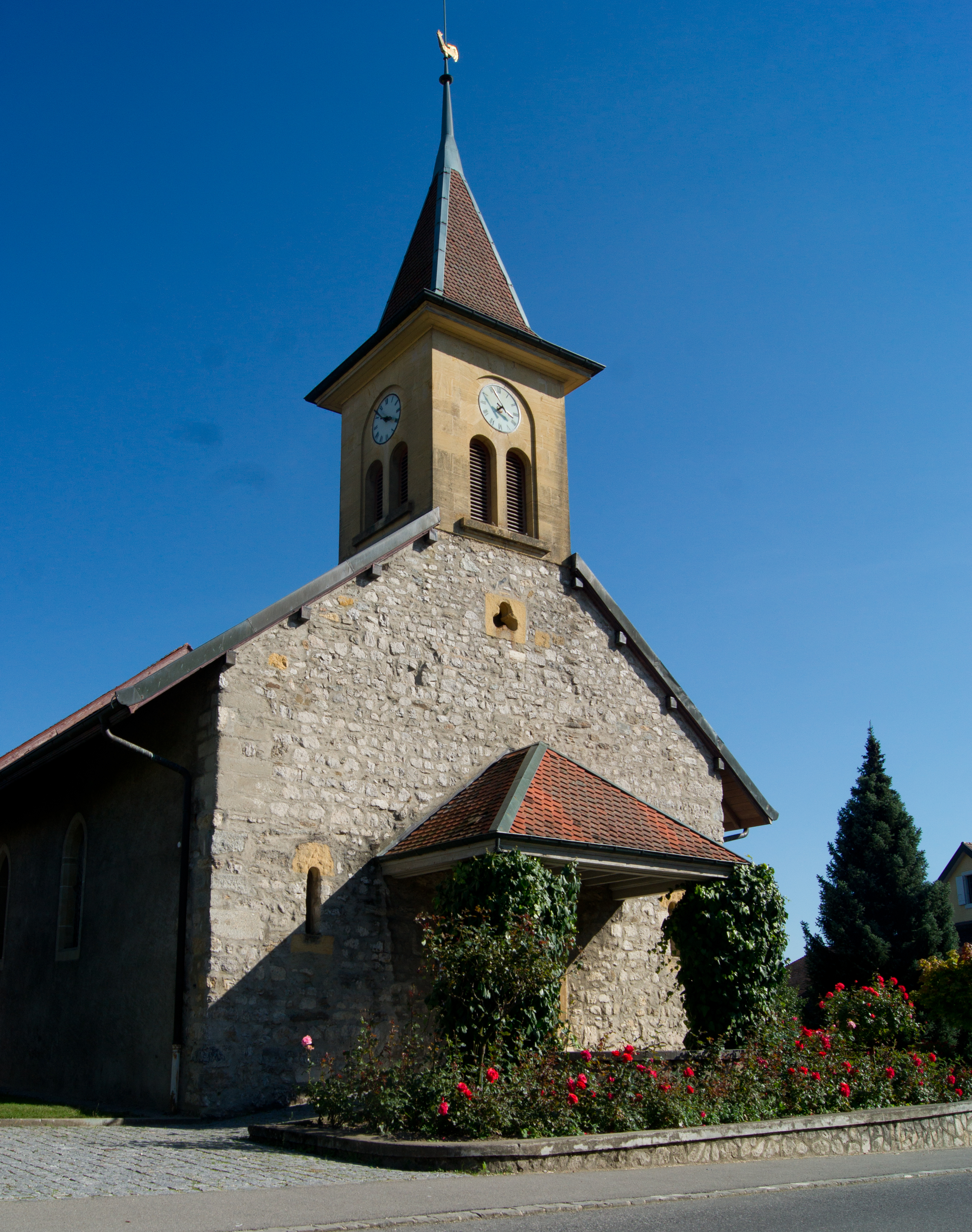
- Oulens-sous-Échallens village church

- Flag Coat of arms
- Location of Oulens-sous-Échallens
- Location within Switzerland Location within Canton of Vaud
- Coordinates: 46°39′N 6°35′E
- Country: Switzerland
- Canton: Vaud
- District: Gros-de-Vaud

Government
  - Mayor: Syndic

Area
  - Total: 5.86 km^{2} (2.26 sq mi)
- Elevation: 588 m (1,929 ft)

Population (December 2004)
  - Total: 415
  - Density: 70.8/km^{2} (183/sq mi)
- Time zone: UTC+01:00 (CET)
  - Summer (DST): UTC+02:00 (CEST)
- Postal code: 1377
- SFOS number: 5529
- ISO 3166 code: CH-VD
- Surrounded by: Bavois, Bettens, Daillens, Éclagnens, Éclépens, Goumoens-le-Jux, Saint-Barthélemy
- Website: www.oulens.ch/

Oulens-sous-Échallens is a municipality in the district of Gros-de-Vaud in the canton of Vaud in Switzerland.

== History ==
Oulens-sous-Échallens is first mentioned in 1207 as Ollens.

== Geography ==
Oulens-sous-Échallens has an area, as of 2009, of 5.86 square kilometers (2.26 sq mi). Of this area, 3.78 km^{2} (1.46 sq mi) or 64.5% is used for agricultural purposes, while 1.45 km^{2} (0.56 sq mi) or 24.7% is forested. Of the rest of the land, 0.64 km^{2} (0.25 sq mi) or 10.9% is settled (buildings or roads).

Of the built-up area, housing and buildings make up 2.9% and transportation infrastructure make up 6.3%. Power and water infrastructure as well as other special developed areas make up 1.4% of the area. Out of the forested land, all of the forested land area is covered with heavy forests. Of the agricultural land, 57.2% is used for growing crops and 6.0% is pastures, while 1.4% is used for orchards or vine crops.

The municipality was part of the Échallens District until it was dissolved on 31 August 2006, and Oulens-sous-Échallens became part of the new district of Gros-de-Vaud.

== Coat of arms ==
The blazon of the municipal coat of arms is Or, fretty Sable.

== Demographics ==
Oulens-sous-Échallens has a population (as of December 2020) of 617. As of 2008, 8.1% of the population are resident foreign nationals. Over the last 10 years (1999–2009) the population has changed at a rate of 11.7%. It has changed at a rate of 12.4% due to migration and at a rate of -0.2% due to births and deaths.

Most of the population (as of 2000) speaks French (403 or 94.4%), with German being second most common (16 or 3.7%) and English being third (3 or 0.7%). There are 2 people who speak Italian.

Of the population in the municipality 127 or about 29.7% were born in Oulens-sous-Échallens and lived there in 2000. There were 178 or 41.7% who were born in the same canton, while 73 or 17.1% were born somewhere else in Switzerland, and 38 or 8.9% were born outside of Switzerland.

In 2008 there were 3 live births to Swiss citizens and were 3 deaths of Swiss citizens. Ignoring immigration and emigration, the population of Swiss citizens remained the same while the foreign population remained the same. There was 1 Swiss woman who emigrated from Switzerland. At the same time, there was 1 non-Swiss man who immigrated from another country to Switzerland and 2 non-Swiss women who emigrated from Switzerland to another country. The total Swiss population change in 2008 (from all sources, including moves across municipal borders) was an increase of 2 and the non-Swiss population increased by 1 people. This represents a population growth rate of 0.7%.

The age distribution, as of 2009, in Oulens-sous-Échallens is; 67 children or 13.8% of the population are between 0 and 9 years old and 63 teenagers or 13.0% are between 10 and 19. Of the adult population, 53 people or 10.9% of the population are between 20 and 29 years old. 87 people or 17.9% are between 30 and 39, 67 people or 13.8% are between 40 and 49, and 57 people or 11.7% are between 50 and 59. The senior population distribution is 57 people or 11.7% of the population are between 60 and 69 years old, 21 people or 4.3% are between 70 and 79, there are 11 people or 2.3% who are between 80 and 89, and there are 3 people or 0.6% who are 90 and older.

As of 2000, there were 181 people who were single and never married in the municipality. There were 209 married individuals, 20 widows or widowers and 17 individuals who are divorced.

As of 2000, there were 173 private households in the municipality, and an average of 2.4 persons per household. There were 56 households that consist of only one person and 18 households with five or more people. Out of a total of 174 households that answered this question, 32.2% were households made up of just one person. Of the rest of the households, there are 50 married couples without children, 59 married couples with children There were 7 single parents with a child or children. There was 1 household that was made up of unrelated people and 1 household that was made up of some sort of institution or another collective housing.

In 2000 there were 55 single family homes (or 51.4% of the total) out of a total of 107 inhabited buildings. There were 16 multi-family buildings (15.0%), along with 31 multi-purpose buildings that were mostly used for housing (29.0%) and 5 other use buildings (commercial or industrial) that also had some housing (4.7%). Of the single family homes 20 were built before 1919, while 7 were built between 1990 and 2000. The most multi-family homes (4) were built between 1981 and 1990 and the next most (3) were built before 1919. There were 2 multi-family houses built between 1996 and 2000.

In 2000 there were 173 apartments in the municipality. The most common apartment size was 5 rooms of which there were 39. There were 11 single room apartments and 75 apartments with five or more rooms. Of these apartments, a total of 166 apartments (96.0% of the total) were permanently occupied, while 6 apartments (3.5%) were seasonally occupied and one apartment was empty. As of 2009, the construction rate of new housing units was 18.5 new units per 1000 residents. The vacancy rate for the municipality, in 2010, was 0%.

The historical population is given in the following chart:

== Politics ==
In the 2007 federal election the most popular party was the SVP which received 33.86% of the vote. The next three most popular parties were the SP (15.33%), the FDP (14.64%) and the Green Party (12.07%). In the federal election, a total of 154 votes were cast, and the voter turnout was 47.4%.

== Economy ==
As of 2010, Oulens-sous-Échallens had an unemployment rate of 3%. As of 2008, there were 34 people employed in the primary economic sector and about 15 businesses involved in this sector. 16 people were employed in the secondary sector and there were 8 businesses in this sector. 62 people were employed in the tertiary sector, with 15 businesses in this sector. There were 228 residents of the municipality who were employed in some capacity, of which females made up 45.2% of the workforce.

In 2008 the total number of full-time equivalent jobs was 86. The number of jobs in the primary sector was 19, all of which were in agriculture. The number of jobs in the secondary sector was 15 of which 7 or (46.7%) were in manufacturing and 7 (46.7%) were in construction. The number of jobs in the tertiary sector was 52. In the tertiary sector; 27 or 51.9% were in wholesale or retail sales or the repair of motor vehicles, 15 or 28.8% were in the movement and storage of goods, 1 was in a hotel or restaurant, 1 was in the information industry, 2 or 3.8% were technical professionals or scientists, 3 or 5.8% were in education.

In 2000, there were 25 workers who commuted into the municipality and 158 workers who commuted away. The municipality is a net exporter of workers, with about 6.3 workers leaving the municipality for every one entering. Of the working population, 3.5% used public transportation to get to work, and 69.7% used a private car.

== Religion ==
From the 2000 census, 68 or 15.9% were Roman Catholic, while 280 or 65.6% belonged to the Swiss Reformed Church. Of the rest of the population, there were 4 individuals (or about 0.94% of the population) who belonged to the Christian Catholic Church, and there were 22 individuals (or about 5.15% of the population) who belonged to another Christian church. There were 3 (or about 0.70% of the population) who were Islamic. There were 1 individual who belonged to another church. 40 (or about 9.37% of the population) belonged to no church, are agnostic or atheist, and 19 individuals (or about 4.45% of the population) did not answer the question.

== Education ==
In Oulens-sous-Échallens about 164 or (38.4%) of the population have completed non-mandatory upper secondary education, and 63 or (14.8%) have completed additional higher education (either university or a Fachhochschule). Of the 63 who completed tertiary schooling, 58.7% were Swiss men, 23.8% were Swiss women, 11.1% were non-Swiss men.

In the 2009/2010 school year there were a total of 62 students in the Oulens-sous-Échallens school district. In the Vaud cantonal school system, two years of non-obligatory pre-school are provided by the political districts. During the school year, the political district provided pre-school care for a total of 296 children of which 96 children (32.4%) received subsidized pre-school care. The canton's primary school program requires students to attend for four years. There were 34 students in the municipal primary school program. The obligatory lower secondary school program lasts for six years and there were 28 students in those schools.

As of 2000, there were 39 students in Oulens-sous-Échallens who came from another municipality, while 44 residents attended schools outside the municipality.
