= Bavois =

- Municipality
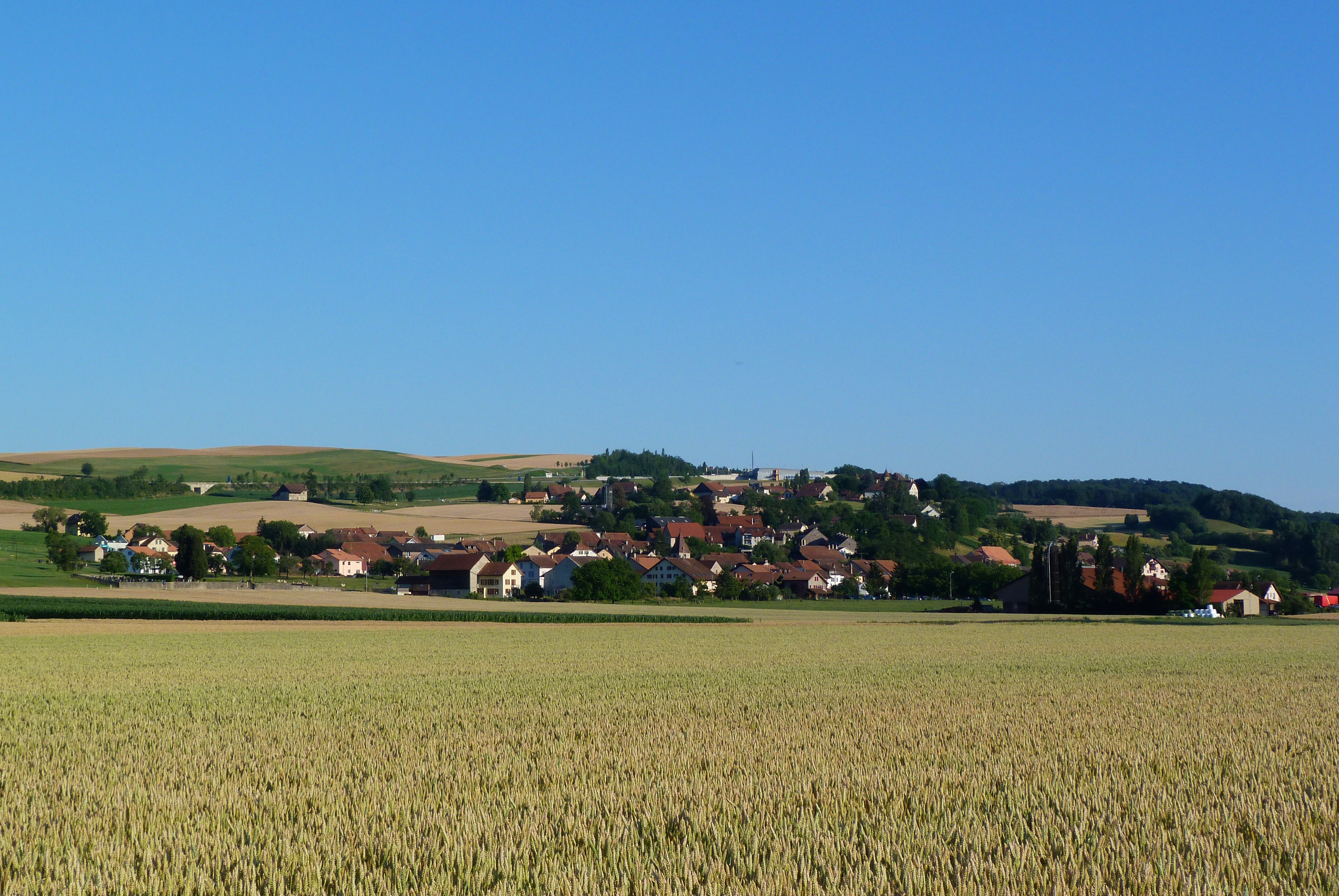
- Bavois village and surrounds

- Flag Coat of arms
- Location of Bavois
- Location within Switzerland Location within Canton of Vaud
- Coordinates: 46°41′N 06°34′E
- Country: Switzerland
- Canton: Vaud
- District: Jura-Nord Vaudois

Government
  - Mayor: Syndic; Olivier Agassis

Area
  - Total: 9.30 km^{2} (3.59 sq mi)
- Elevation: 441 m (1,447 ft)

Population (2004)
  - Total: 708
  - Density: 76.1/km^{2} (197/sq mi)
- Demonym(s): Les Bavoisans; Les Agasses
- Time zone: UTC+01:00 (CET)
  - Summer (DST): UTC+02:00 (CEST)
- Postal code: 1372
- SFOS number: 5746
- ISO 3166 code: CH-VD
- Localities: Bavois, Le Coudray
- Surrounded by: Chavornay, Penthéréaz, Goumoens-le-Jux, Oulens-sous-Échallens, Éclépens, Orny, Pompaples, Arnex-sur-Orbe
- Website: https://www.bavois.ch Profile (in French), SFSO statistics

Bavois is a municipality in the district of Jura-Nord Vaudois of the canton of Vaud in Switzerland.

== History ==
Bavois is first mentioned in 1200 as Bavoies.

== Geography ==
Bavois has an area, as of 2009, of 9.3 square kilometers (3.6 mi^{2}). Of this area, 6.94 km^{2} (2.68 mi^{2}) or 74.3% is used for agricultural purposes, while 1.54 km^{2} (0.59 mi^{2}) or 16.5% is forested. Of the rest of the land, 0.71 km^{2} (0.27 mi^{2}) or 7.6% is settled (buildings or roads), 0.01 km^{2} (2.5 acres) or 0.1% is either rivers or lakes and 0.1 km^{2} (25 acres) or 1.1% is unproductive land.

Of the built up area, housing and buildings made up 2.9% and transportation infrastructure made up 4.4%. Out of the forested land, 15.3% of the total land area is heavily forested and 1.2% is covered with orchards or small clusters of trees. Of the agricultural land, 62.8% is used for growing crops and 10.0% is pastures, while 1.5% is used for orchards or vine crops. All the water in the municipality is flowing water.

The municipality was part of the Orbe District until it was dissolved on 31 August 2006, and Bavois became part of the new district of Jura-Nord Vaudois.

It consists of the village of Bavois, the settlement of Les Bordes (Bavois-dessus) and the hamlet of Le Coudray.

== Coat of arms ==
The blazon of the municipal coat of arms is Or, two castles 1-1 Sable, lined and windowed of the first.

== Demographics ==
Bavois has a population (as of December 2020) of 994. As of 2008, 12.2% of the population are resident foreign nationals. Over the last 10 years (1999–2009 ) the population has changed at a rate of 1.5%. It has changed at a rate of -5.3% due to migration and at a rate of 6.5% due to births and deaths.

Most of the population (as of 2000) speaks French (676 or 93.0%), with German being second most common (31 or 4.3%) and Portuguese being third (10 or 1.4%). There are 3 people who speak Italian.

The age distribution, as of 2009, in Bavois is; 83 children or 11.3% of the population are between 0 and 9 years old and 107 teenagers or 14.6% are between 10 and 19. Of the adult population, 90 people or 12.3% of the population are between 20 and 29 years old. 99 people or 13.5% are between 30 and 39, 130 people or 17.7% are between 40 and 49, and 94 people or 12.8% are between 50 and 59. The senior population distribution is 71 people or 9.7% of the population are between 60 and 69 years old, 28 people or 3.8% are between 70 and 79, there are 27 people or 3.7% who are between 80 and 89, and there are 4 people or 0.5% who are 90 and older.

As of 2000, there were 320 people who were single and never married in the municipality. There were 351 married individuals, 24 widows or widowers and 32 individuals who are divorced.

As of 2000, there were 283 private households in the municipality, and an average of 2.5 persons per household. There were 75 households that consist of only one person and 26 households with five or more people. Out of a total of 294 households that answered this question, 25.5% were households made up of just one person and there was 1 adult who lived with their parents. Of the rest of the households, there are 88 married couples without children, 97 married couples with children There were 19 single parents with a child or children. There were 3 households that were made up of unrelated people and 11 households that were made up of some sort of institution or another collective housing.

In 2000 there were 101 single family homes (or 54.6% of the total) out of a total of 185 inhabited buildings. There were 43 multi-family buildings (23.2%), along with 36 multi-purpose buildings that were mostly used for housing (19.5%) and 5 other use buildings (commercial or industrial) that also had some housing (2.7%).

In 2000, a total of 271 apartments (80.9% of the total) were permanently occupied, while 55 apartments (16.4%) were seasonally occupied and 9 apartments (2.7%) were empty. As of 2009, the construction rate of new housing units was 0 new units per 1000 residents. The vacancy rate for the municipality, in 2010, was 1.13%.

The historical population is given in the following chart:

== Politics ==
In the 2007 federal election the most popular party was the SVP which received 36.61% of the vote. The next three most popular parties were the SP (24.49%), the Green Party (14.66%) and the FDP (5.4%). In the federal election, a total of 179 votes were cast, and the voter turnout was 38.1%.

== Peat exploitation ==
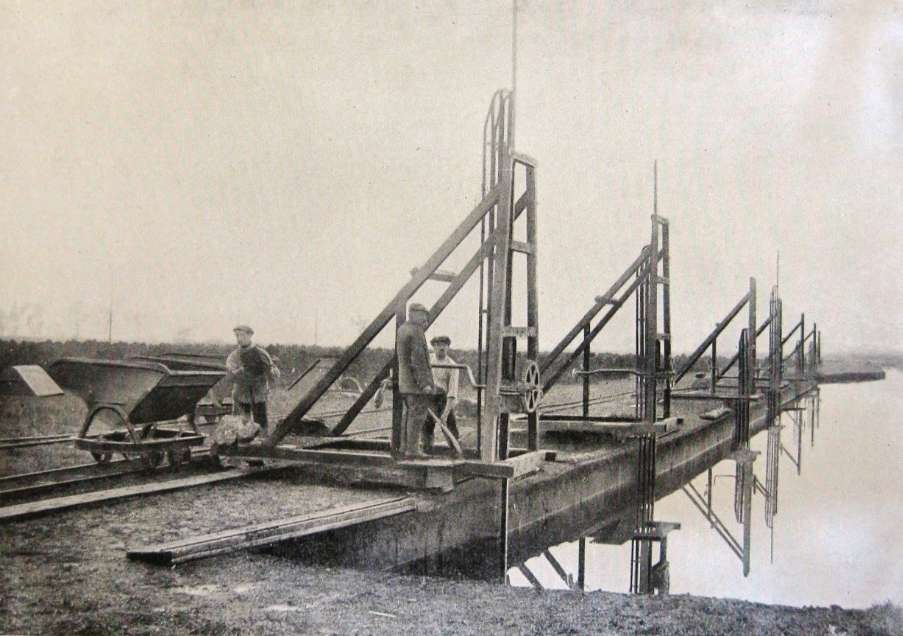
Peat cutting machine with manual operation on a peat field in the canton of Vaud, 1917

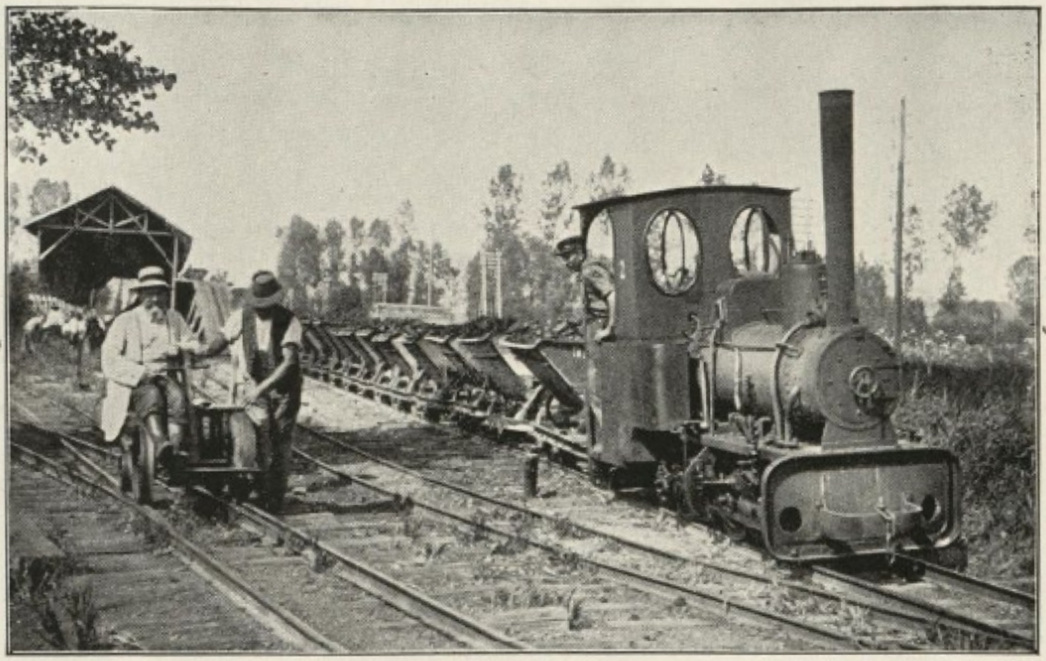
Narrow gauge peat railway in the bogs of Bavois

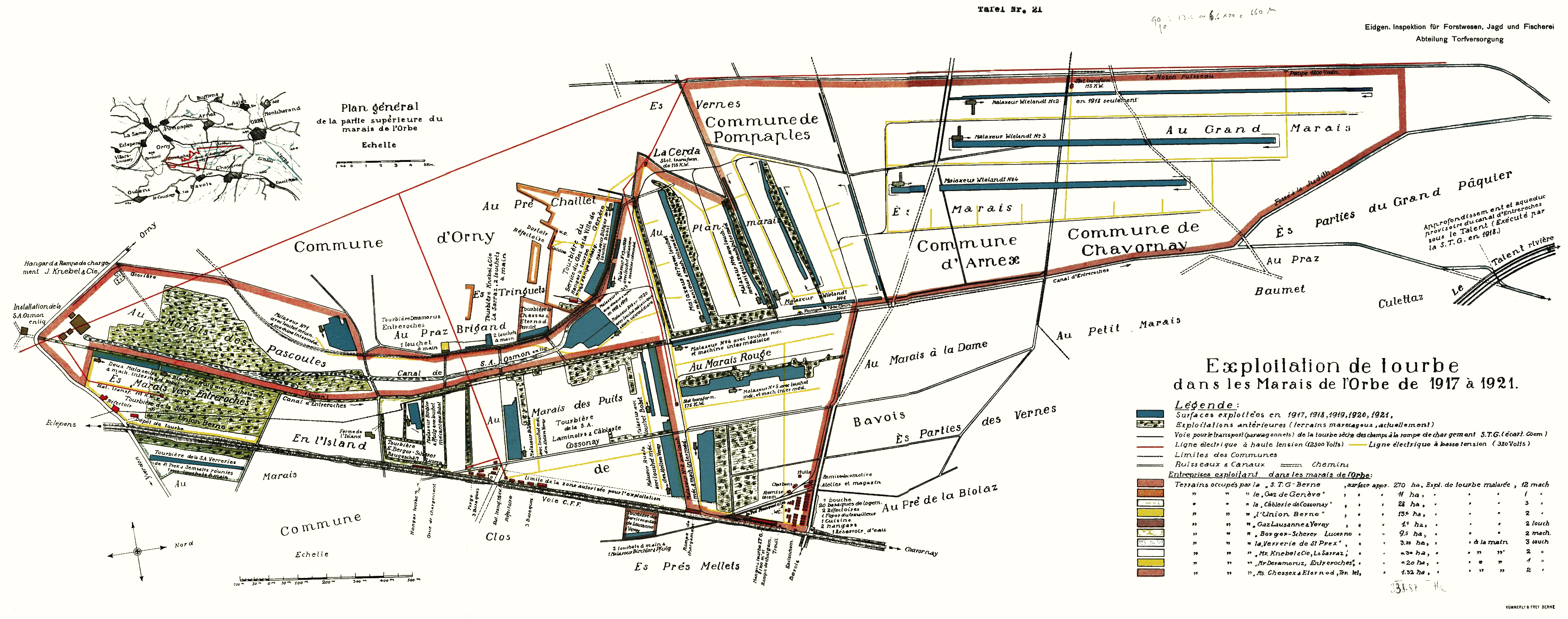
Historic map of the peat exploitation in the Marais d'Orbe from 1917 to 1921

S.A. de Laminoirs et Cablerie Cossonay operated in and after World War I two extensive Decauville peat railways with 500 and 600 mm gauges in the Marais des Puits in the Orbe plain near Bavois. Their peat presses were set up permanently at a suitable location, and the wet peat was transported from the mobile cutting machines via innovative endless wire sod conveyors to fixed transporteurs and from there by tipping trucks on Decauville tracks to the peat presses.

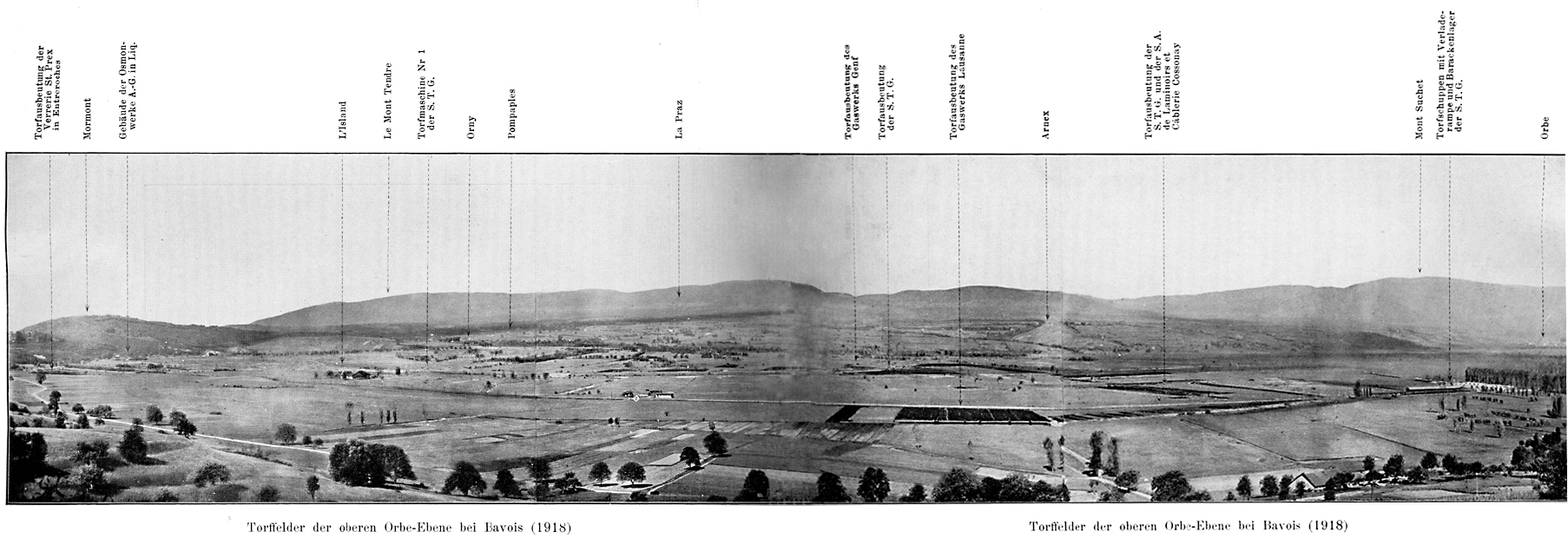
Peat fields of the upper Orbe plain near Bavois, 1918

The length of the transportable tracks and the flying collection tracks for the eight peat machines varied greatly because of earlier peat exploitation pits and canals. They consisted of about 6358 m of 600 mm (1 ft 11 5/8 in) gauge Decauville track with 50 to 70 mm high rails and about 636 m of mostly hired 500 mm (19 3/4 in) gauge Decauville track with 45 to 60 mm high rails. The rolling stock for the peat exploitation consisted of 80 platform wagons with a gauge of 600 mm. The rolling stock for peat exploitation consisted of 80 platform wagons of 60 cm. gauge and 10 platform wagons of 50 cm. gauge; thus, on average, 11 platform wagons were available for each peat machine. Due to the large demand for tracks and rolling stock, there were supply difficulties, so that the peat season of 1918 largely passed before the necessary material had been delivered. As the demand for tracks was very high in 1918 due to the large number of peat fields to be exploited and due to many ground improvement works being carried out at the same time, one could not be choosy in the acquisition of track material despite high purchase prices, but had to take what one could get.

A track gauge of 600 mm was uniformly chosen for the transport tracks. They were made of 65 to 110 millimetres (2.6 to 4.3 in), mostly 90 millimetres (3.5 in), high loose rails of 10 to 18 kilograms (22 to 40 lb) weight per metre laid on wooden sleepers. The most frequented lines were underlaid with a ballast bed of mine gravel or slag. Their total length was about 13 kilometres (8.1 mi). The rolling stock consisted of four light railway locomotives, 104 tipping lorries of 750 litres (160 imp gal; 200 US gal) capacity and 16 platform wagons. In the transport tracks there were 39 points for the transportable tracks, partly on wooden sleepers, partly on steel sleepers. There were also a large number of turntables and climbing turntables. The latter were used in particular to connect the transportable tracks with the permanent tracks.

Material	Value
29.429 m rails for 600 mm track with accessories (lugs, bolts etc.)	342,533.77 SFR
Laying and ballasting of the track	41,063.10 SFR
Construction of 2 bridges for the transport tracks	5,351.77 SFR
27,652 pieces of wooden sleepers	11,7422.68 SFR
6,358 m complete Decauville tracks, 600 mm gauge	113,500.75 SFR
336 m complete Decauville tracks, 500 mm gauge	113,500.75 SFR
400 m Decauville track, 600 mm gauge on hire	113,500.75 SFR
28 turnouts, complete	3,474.90 SFR
6 turntables	3,474.90 SFR
104 tipping wagons, 600 mm gauge, 750 L	49,289.30 SFR
80 trolleys, 600 mm gauge	49,289.30 SFR
10 shelf wagons, 500 mm gauge	41,200.70 SFR
16 platform wagons	41,200.70 SFR
1 construction locomotive, 12-15 hp	41,200.70 SFR
1 construction locomotive, 15 hp	41,200.70 SFR
1 construction locomotive, 30 hp	41,200.70 SFR
1 construction locomotive, 15 hp	41,200.70 SFR
2 trolleys for Decauville tracks	1,656.05 SFR
Total	715,493.02 SFR

== Economy ==
As of 2010, Bavois had an unemployment rate of 3.7%. As of 2008, there were 49 people employed in the primary economic sector and about 19 businesses involved in this sector. 3 people were employed in the secondary sector and there were 3 businesses in this sector. 106 people were employed in the tertiary sector, with 11 businesses in this sector. There were 383 residents of the municipality who were employed in some capacity, of which females made up 43.6% of the workforce.

In 2008 the total number of full-time equivalent jobs was 104. The number of jobs in the primary sector was 34, all of which were in agriculture. The number of jobs in the secondary sector was 3 of which 2 or (66.7%) were in manufacturing and 1 was in construction. The number of jobs in the tertiary sector was 67. In the tertiary sector; 9 or 13.4% were in wholesale or retail sales or the repair of motor vehicles, 2 or 3.0% were in the movement and storage of goods, 43 or 64.2% were in a hotel or restaurant, 1 was a technical professional or scientist, 6 or 9.0% were in education.

In 2000, there were 26 workers who commuted into the municipality and 296 workers who commuted away. The municipality is a net exporter of workers, with about 11.4 workers leaving the municipality for every one entering. Of the working population, 12.3% used public transportation to get to work, and 65.8% used a private car.

== Religion ==
From the 2000 census, 131 or 18.0% were Roman Catholic, while 443 or 60.9% belonged to the Swiss Reformed Church. Of the rest of the population, there were 16 individuals (or about 2.20% of the population) who belonged to another Christian church. There were 2 individuals (or about 0.28% of the population) who were Jewish, and 2 (or about 0.28% of the population) who were Islamic. There was 1 person who was Buddhist. 124 (or about 17.06% of the population) belonged to no church, are agnostic or atheist, and 16 individuals (or about 2.20% of the population) did not answer the question.

== Education ==
In Bavois about 292 or (40.2%) of the population have completed non-mandatory upper secondary education, and 87 or (12.0%) have completed additional higher education (either university or a Fachhochschule). Of the 87 who completed tertiary schooling, 46.0% were Swiss men, 29.9% were Swiss women, 18.4% were non-Swiss men and 5.7% were non-Swiss women.

In the 2009/2010 school year there were a total of 94 students in the Bavois school district. In the Vaud cantonal school system, two years of non-obligatory pre-school are provided by the political districts. During the school year, the political district provided pre-school care for a total of 578 children of which 359 children (62.1%) received subsidized pre-school care. The canton's primary school program requires students to attend for four years. There were 50 students in the municipal primary school program. The obligatory lower secondary school program lasts for six years and there were 44 students in those schools.

As of 2000, there were 18 students in Bavois who came from another municipality, while 115 residents attended schools outside the municipality.

== Transportation ==
The municipality has a railway station, Bavois, on the Jura Foot line. It has regular service to Grandson, Yverdon-les-Bains, and Lausanne.

== Sport ==
FC Bavois is the municipality's football club.
