= Éclagnens =

- Former municipality
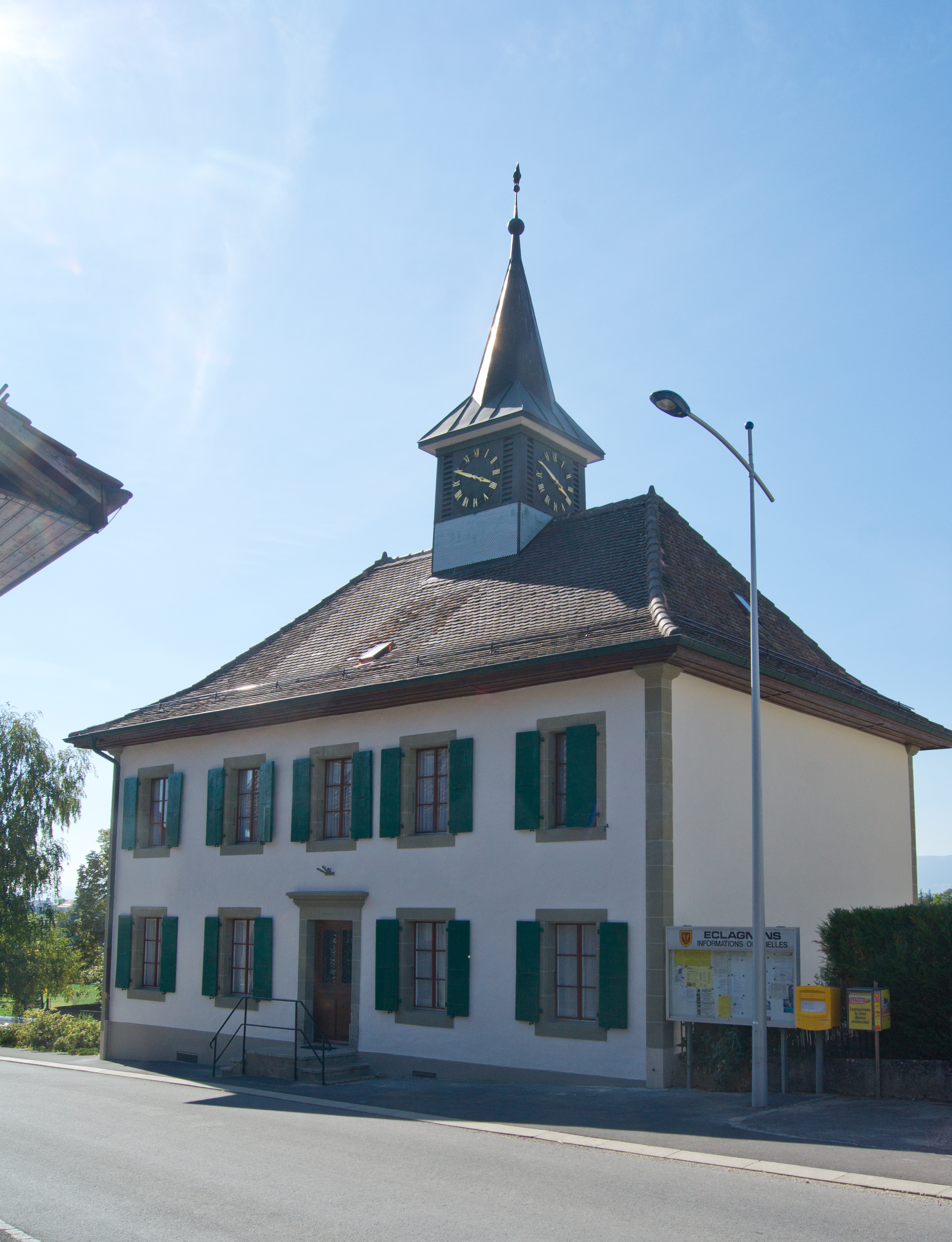
- Éclagnens village administration building

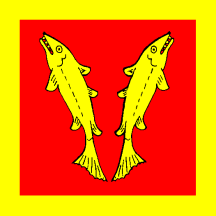
- Flag Coat of arms
- Location of Éclagnens
- Location within Switzerland Location within Canton of Vaud
- Coordinates: 46°39′N 6°35′E
- Country: Switzerland
- Canton: Vaud
- District: Gros-de-Vaud

Area
  - Total: 2.14 km^{2} (0.83 sq mi)
- Elevation: 593 m (1,946 ft)

Population (December 2009)
  - Total: 113
  - Density: 52.8/km^{2} (137/sq mi)
- Time zone: UTC+01:00 (CET)
  - Summer (DST): UTC+02:00 (CEST)
- Postal code: 1376
- SFOS number: 5519
- ISO 3166 code: CH-VD
- Surrounded by: Goumoens-la-Ville, Goumoens-le-Jux, Oulens-sous-Échallens, Saint-Barthélemy
- Website: Profile (in French), SFSO statistics

Éclagnens is a former municipality in the district of Gros-de-Vaud in the canton of Vaud in Switzerland.

The municipalities of Éclagnens, Goumoens-la-Ville and Goumoens-le-Jux merged on 1 July 2011 into the new municipality of Goumoëns.

== History ==
Éclagnens is first mentioned in 1265 as de Clanens.

== Geography ==
Éclagnens has an area, as of 2009, of 2.14 square kilometers (0.83 sq mi). Of this area, 1.67 km^{2} (0.64 sq mi) or 78.0% is used for agricultural purposes, while 0.31 km^{2} (0.12 sq mi) or 14.5% is forested. Of the rest of the land, 0.12 km^{2} (30 acres) or 5.6% is settled (buildings or roads).

Of the built up area, housing and buildings made up 2.3% and transportation infrastructure made up 2.8%. Out of the forested land, all of the forested land area is covered with heavy forests. Of the agricultural land, 66.8% is used for growing crops and 10.7% is pastures.

The municipality was part of the Échallens District until it was dissolved on 31 August 2006, and Éclagnens became part of the new district of Gros-de-Vaud.

The municipality is located in the middle of the Gros-de-Vaud region.

== Coat of arms ==
The blazon of the municipal coat of arms is Gules, bordered Or, two Bars (or Sea-daces) addorsed of the second.

== Demographics ==
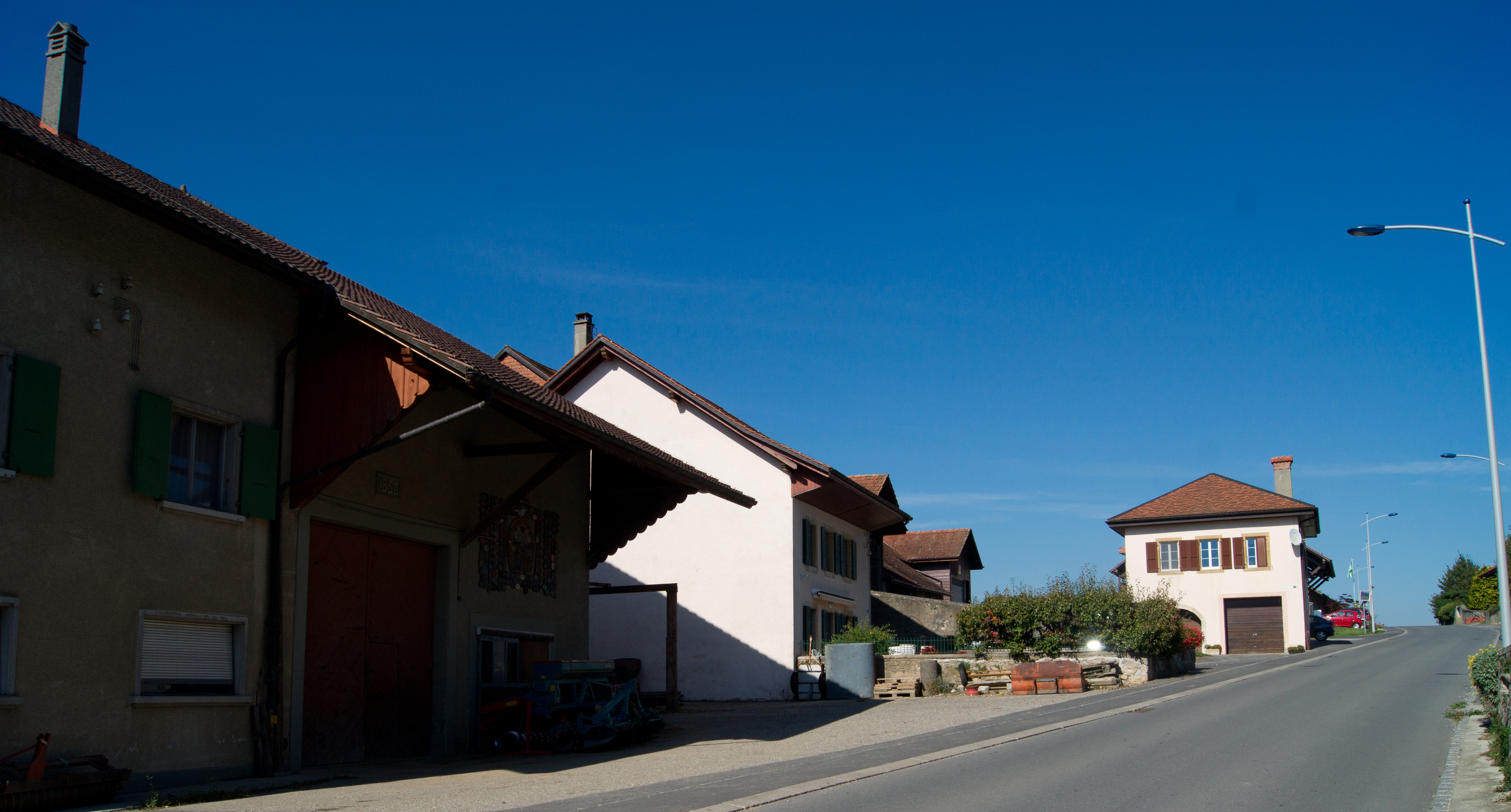
Main street in Éclagnens

Éclagnens has a population (as of 2009) of 113. As of 2008, 6.0% of the population are resident foreign nationals. Over the last 10 years (1999–2009 ) the population has changed at a rate of 82.3%. It has changed at a rate of 77.4% due to migration and at a rate of 6.5% due to births and deaths. All of the population (as of 2000) speaks French.

Of the population in the municipality 23 or about 27.7% were born in Éclagnens and lived there in 2000. There were 35 or 42.2% who were born in the same canton, while 7 or 8.4% were born somewhere else in Switzerland, and 3 or 3.6% were born outside of Switzerland.

In 2008 there was 1 live birth to Swiss citizens and 1 death of a Swiss citizen. Ignoring immigration and emigration, the population of Swiss citizens remained the same while the foreign population remained the same. The total Swiss population change in 2008 (from all sources, including moves across municipal borders) was a decrease of 2 and the non-Swiss population decreased by 2 people. This represents a population growth rate of -3.8%.

The age distribution, as of 2009, in Éclagnens is; 23 children or 20.4% of the population are between 0 and 9 years old and 6 teenagers or 5.3% are between 10 and 19. Of the adult population, 7 people or 6.2% of the population are between 20 and 29 years old. 31 people or 27.4% are between 30 and 39, 15 people or 13.3% are between 40 and 49, and 11 people or 9.7% are between 50 and 59. The senior population distribution is 9 people or 8.0% of the population are between 60 and 69 years old, 6 people or 5.3% are between 70 and 79, there are 3 people or 2.7% who are between 80 and 89, and there are 2 people or 1.8% who are 90 and older.

As of 2000, there were 30 people who were single and never married in the municipality. There were 41 married individuals, 6 widows or widowers and 6 individuals who are divorced.

As of 2000 the average number of residents per living room was 0.52 which is fewer people per room than the cantonal average of 0.61 per room. In this case, a room is defined as space of a housing unit of at least 4 m^{2} (43 sq ft) as normal bedrooms, dining rooms, living rooms, kitchens and habitable cellars and attics. About 58.6% of the total households were owner occupied, or in other words did not pay rent (though they may have a mortgage or a rent-to-own agreement).

As of 2000, there were 29 private households in the municipality, and an average of 2.5 persons per household. There were 6 households that consist of only one person and 3 households with five or more people. Out of a total of 30 households that answered this question, 20.0% were households made up of just one person. Of the rest of the households, there are 13 married couples without children, 7 married couples with children There were 2 single parents with a child or children. There was 1 household that was made up of unrelated people and 1 household that was made up of some sort of institution or another collective housing.

In 2000 there were 12 single family homes (or 50.0% of the total) out of a total of 24 inhabited buildings. There were 1 multi-family buildings (4.2%), along with 9 multi-purpose buildings that were mostly used for housing (37.5%) and 2 other use buildings (commercial or industrial) that also had some housing (8.3%). Of the single family homes 8 were built before 1919, while 1 was built between 1990 and 2000. The most multi-family homes (1) were built between 1991 and 1995.

In 2000 there were 31 apartments in the municipality. The most common apartment size was 3 rooms of which there were 8. There were 1 single room apartments and 10 apartments with five or more rooms. Of these apartments, a total of 29 apartments (93.5% of the total) were permanently occupied, while 1 apartment was seasonally occupied and one apartment was empty. As of 2009, the construction rate of new housing units was 8.8 new units per 1000 residents. The vacancy rate for the municipality, in 2010, was 0%.

The historical population is given in the following chart:

== Politics ==
In the 2007 federal election the most popular party was the SVP which received 42.95% of the vote. The next three most popular parties were the Green Party (18.34%), the FDP (14.73%) and the SP (8.93%). In the federal election, a total of 38 votes were cast, and the voter turnout was 53.5%.

== Economy ==
As of 2010, Éclagnens had an unemployment rate of 3.5%. As of 2008, there were 14 people employed in the primary economic sector and about 7 businesses involved in this sector. No one is employed in the secondary sector. 2 people were employed in the tertiary sector, with 1 business in this sector. There were 35 residents of the municipality who were employed in some capacity, of which females made up 45.7% of the workforce.

In 2008 the total number of full-time equivalent jobs was 11. The number of jobs in the primary sector was 9, all of which were in agriculture. There were no jobs in the secondary sector. The number of jobs in the tertiary sector was 2, both of which were technical professionals or scientists.

In 2000, there were 26 workers who commuted away from the municipality. Of the working population, 2.9% used public transportation to get to work, and 74.3% used a private car.

== Religion ==
From the 2000 census, 9 or 10.8% were Roman Catholic, while 56 or 67.5% belonged to the Swiss Reformed Church. 10 (or about 12.05% of the population) belonged to no church, are agnostic or atheist, and 8 individuals (or about 9.64% of the population) did not answer the question.

== Education ==
In Éclagnens about 24 or (28.9%) of the population have completed non-mandatory upper secondary education, and 11 or (13.3%) have completed additional higher education (either University or a Fachhochschule). Of the 11 who completed tertiary schooling, 45.5% were Swiss men, 54.5% were Swiss women.

In the 2009/2010 school year there were a total of 17 students in the Éclagnens school district. In the Vaud cantonal school system, two years of non-obligatory pre-school are provided by the political districts. During the school year, the political district provided pre-school care for a total of 296 children of which 96 children (32.4%) received subsidized pre-school care. The canton's primary school program requires students to attend for four years. There were 13 students in the municipal primary school program. The obligatory lower secondary school program lasts for six years and there were 3 students in those schools. There were also 1 students who were home schooled or attended another non-traditional school.

As of 2000, there were 12 students from Éclagnens who attended schools outside the municipality.
