= Penthéréaz =

- Municipality
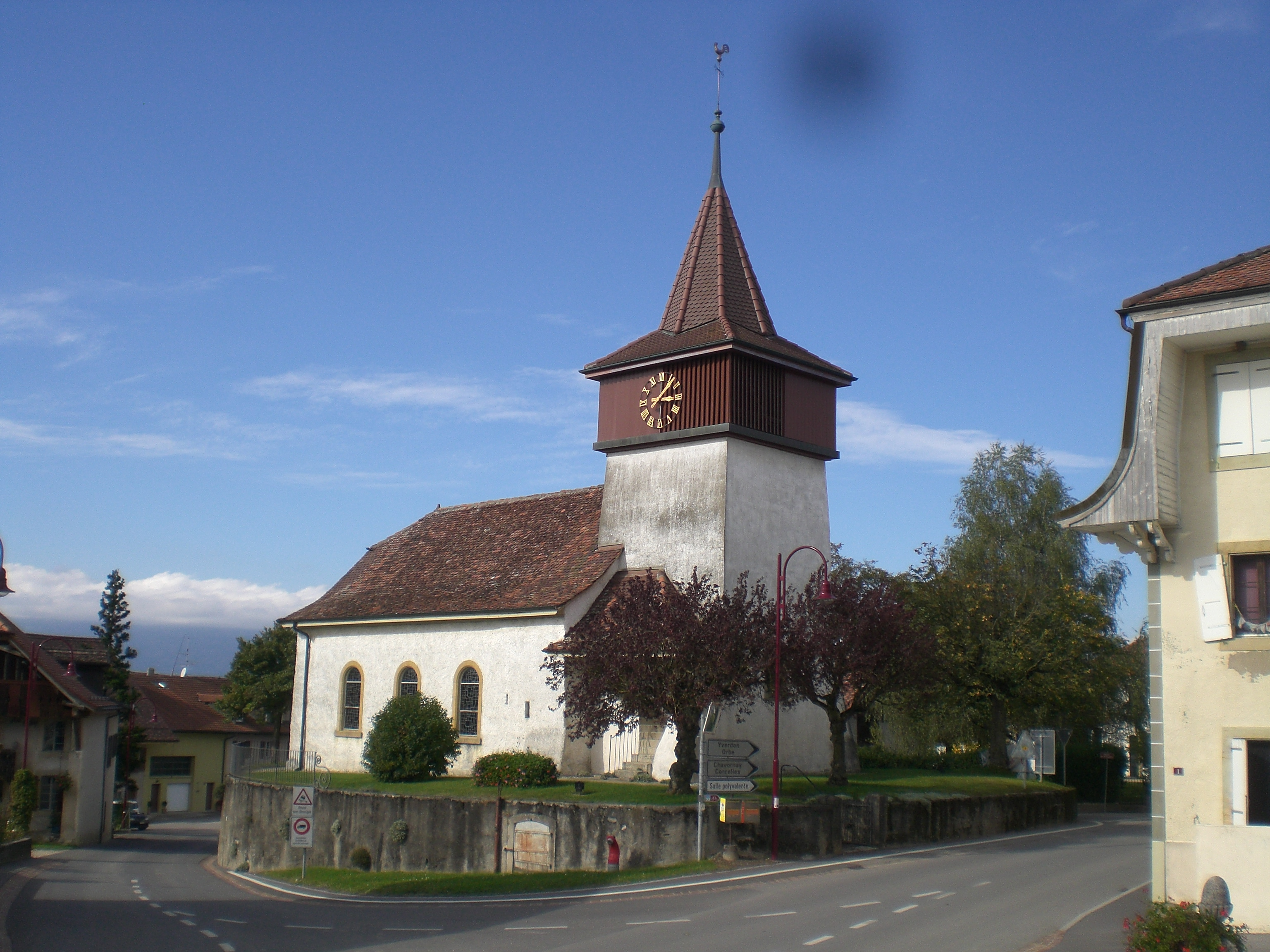

- Flag Coat of arms
- Location of Penthéréaz
- Location within Switzerland Location within Canton of Vaud
- Coordinates: 46°41′N 6°36′E
- Country: Switzerland
- Canton: Vaud
- District: Gros-de-Vaud

Government
  - Mayor: Syndic

Area
  - Total: 5.68 km^{2} (2.19 sq mi)
- Elevation: 624 m (2,047 ft)

Population (December 2004)
  - Total: 363
  - Density: 63.9/km^{2} (166/sq mi)
- Time zone: UTC+01:00 (CET)
  - Summer (DST): UTC+02:00 (CEST)
- Postal code: 1375
- SFOS number: 5531
- ISO 3166 code: CH-VD
- Surrounded by: Bavois, Chavornay, Corcelles-sur-Chavornay, Goumoens-la-Ville, Goumoens-le-Jux, Villars-le-Terroir, Vuarrens
- Website: http://www.penthereaz.ch Profile (in French), SFSO statistics

Penthéréaz is a municipality in the district of Gros-de-Vaud in the canton of Vaud in Switzerland.

== History ==
Penthéréaz is first mentioned in 1141 as Panterea.

== Geography ==
Penthéréaz has an area, as of 2009, of 5.68 square kilometers (2.19 sq mi). Of this area, 3.66 km^{2} (1.41 sq mi) or 64.4% is used for agricultural purposes, while 1.71 km^{2} (0.66 sq mi) or 30.1% is forested. Of the rest of the land, 0.31 km^{2} (0.12 sq mi) or 5.5% is settled (buildings or roads), 0.01 km^{2} (2.5 acres) or 0.2% is either rivers or lakes.

Of the built up area, housing and buildings made up 2.5% and transportation infrastructure made up 2.5%. Out of the forested land, all of the forested land area is covered with heavy forests. Of the agricultural land, 56.5% is used for growing crops and 6.5% is pastures, while 1.4% is used for orchards or vine crops. All the water in the municipality is in lakes.

The municipality was part of the Echallens District until it was dissolved on 31 August 2006, and Penthéréaz became part of the new district of Gros-de-Vaud.

It consists of the village of Penthéréaz and three hamlets.

== Coat of arms ==
The blazon of the municipal coat of arms is Per pale Or and Gules, two Corn Ears counterchanged.

== Demographics ==
Penthéréaz has a population (as of December 2020) of 419. As of 2008, 5.5% of the population are resident foreign nationals. Over the last 10 years (1999–2009) the population has changed at a rate of 9.9%. It has changed at a rate of 3.9% due to migration and at a rate of 6.9% due to births and deaths.

Most of the population (as of 2000) speaks French (325 or 95.0%), with German being second most common (7 or 2.0%) and Portuguese being third (6 or 1.8%). There are 2 people who speak Italian.

Of the population in the municipality 116 or about 33.9% were born in Penthéréaz and lived there in 2000. There were 148 or 43.3% who were born in the same canton, while 44 or 12.9% were born somewhere else in Switzerland, and 27 or 7.9% were born outside of Switzerland.

In 2008 there were 4 live births to Swiss citizens and 1 death of a Swiss citizen. Ignoring immigration and emigration, the population of Swiss citizens increased by 3 while the foreign population remained the same. There was 1 Swiss woman who immigrated back to Switzerland. At the same time, there was 1 non-Swiss man who immigrated from another country to Switzerland. The total Swiss population change in 2008 (from all sources, including moves across municipal borders) was an increase of 4 and the non-Swiss population decreased by 3 people. This represents a population growth rate of 0.3%.

The age distribution, as of 2009, in Penthéréaz is; 46 children or 12.5% of the population are between 0 and 9 years old and 52 teenagers or 14.2% are between 10 and 19. Of the adult population, 41 people or 11.2% of the population are between 20 and 29 years old. 53 people or 14.4% are between 30 and 39, 68 people or 18.5% are between 40 and 49, and 47 people or 12.8% are between 50 and 59. The senior population distribution is 26 people or 7.1% of the population are between 60 and 69 years old, 22 people or 6.0% are between 70 and 79, there are 10 people or 2.7% who are between 80 and 89, and there are 2 people or 0.5% who are 90 and older.

As of 2000, there were 155 people who were single and never married in the municipality. There were 157 married individuals, 18 widows or widowers and 12 individuals who are divorced.

As of 2000, there were 128 private households in the municipality, and an average of 2.7 persons per household. There were 29 households that consist of only one person and 14 households with five or more people. Out of a total of 128 households that answered this question, 22.7% were households made up of just one person and there were 2 adults who lived with their parents. Of the rest of the households, there are 29 married couples without children, 52 married couples with children There were 12 single parents with a child or children. There were 4 households that were made up of unrelated people.

In 2000 there were 37 single family homes (or 45.1% of the total) out of a total of 82 inhabited buildings. There were 21 multi-family buildings (25.6%), along with 19 multi-purpose buildings that were mostly used for housing (23.2%) and 5 other use buildings (commercial or industrial) that also had some housing (6.1%). Of the single family homes 16 were built before 1919, while 3 were built between 1990 and 2000. The most multi-family homes (6) were built before 1919 and the next most (4) were built between 1971 and 1980. There was 1 multi-family house built between 1996 and 2000.

In 2000 there were 132 apartments in the municipality. The most common apartment size was 4 rooms of which there were 36. There were 3 single room apartments and 53 apartments with five or more rooms. Of these apartments, a total of 122 apartments (92.4% of the total) were permanently occupied, while 7 apartments (5.3%) were seasonally occupied and 3 apartments (2.3%) were empty. As of 2009, the construction rate of new housing units was 8.2 new units per 1000 residents. The vacancy rate for the municipality, in 2010, was 0%.

The historical population is given in the following chart:

== Politics ==
In the 2007 federal election the most popular party was the SVP which received 21.95% of the vote. The next three most popular parties were the SP (16.51%), the FDP (15.43%) and the Green Party (14.12%). In the federal election, a total of 104 votes were cast, and the voter turnout was 41.1%.

== Economy ==
As of 2010, Penthéréaz had an unemployment rate of 4%. As of 2008, there were 41 people employed in the primary economic sector and about 16 businesses involved in this sector. 26 people were employed in the secondary sector and there were 7 businesses in this sector. 16 people were employed in the tertiary sector, with 4 businesses in this sector. There were 181 residents of the municipality who were employed in some capacity, of which females made up 45.3% of the workforce.

In 2008 the total number of full-time equivalent jobs was 64. The number of jobs in the primary sector was 27, all of which were in agriculture. The number of jobs in the secondary sector was 23 of which 9 or (39.1%) were in manufacturing and 14 (60.9%) were in construction. The number of jobs in the tertiary sector was 14, of which 10 or 71.4% were in the information industry and 4 or 28.6% were in education.

In 2000, there were 23 workers who commuted into the municipality and 123 workers who commuted away. The municipality is a net exporter of workers, with about 5.3 workers leaving the municipality for every one entering. Of the working population, 7.7% used public transportation to get to work, and 63% used a private car.

== Religion ==
From the 2000 census, 77 or 22.5% were Roman Catholic, while 219 or 64.0% belonged to the Swiss Reformed Church. Of the rest of the population, there were 9 individuals (or about 2.63% of the population) who belonged to another Christian church. 36 (or about 10.53% of the population) belonged to no church, are agnostic or atheist and 5 individuals (or about 1.46% of the population) did not answer the question.

== Education ==
In Penthéréaz about 132 or (38.6%) of the population have completed non-mandatory upper secondary education, and 44 or (12.9%) have completed additional higher education (either university or a Fachhochschule). Of the 44 who completed tertiary schooling, 65.9% were Swiss men, 29.5% were Swiss women.

In the 2009/2010 school year there were a total of 59 students in the Penthéréaz school district. In the Vaud cantonal school system, two years of non-obligatory pre-school are provided by the political districts. During the school year, the political district provided pre-school care for a total of 296 children of which 96 children (32.4%) received subsidized pre-school care. The canton's primary school program requires students to attend for four years. There were 32 students in the municipal primary school program. The obligatory lower secondary school program lasts for six years and there were 26 students in those schools. There were also 1 students who were home schooled or attended another non-traditional school.

As of 2000, there were 25 students in Penthéréaz who came from another municipality, while 58 residents attended schools outside the municipality.
