= Bettens (surname) =

Bettens is a surname. Notable people with the surname include:

- Gert Bettens (born 1970), Belgian singer-songwriter
- Sam Bettens (born 1972), Belgian singer
- Prudent Bettens (1943–2010), Belgian association football player
