= Montheron Abbey =

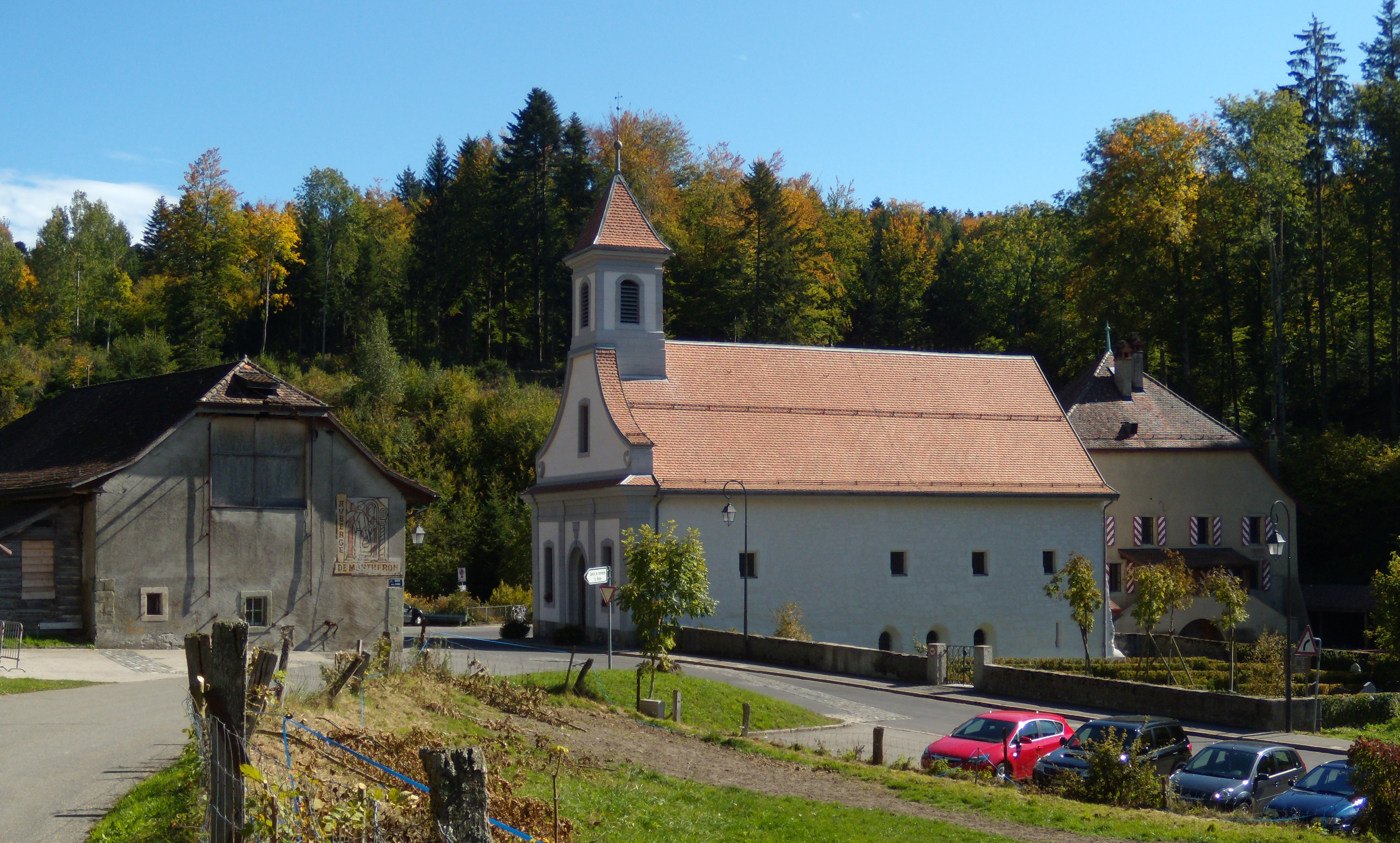
- Montheron Abbey in 2010
- Montheron Abbey
- Location: Montheron, Lausanne
- Country: Switzerland

History
- Founded: 1045

Architecture
- Closed: 16th century

Administration
- Diocese: Evangelical Reformed Church of the Canton of Vaud

Montheron Abbey is an historic monastery in Montheron near Lausanne in Switzerland. It was established by the Cistercians in 1045. The abbey was closed down in the 16th century and its abbey church used as a Reformed church after 1536. However, the architect William Fraisse redesigned the facade of the church in the Baroque architectural style in 1782.

== See also ==
· · ·
