= Goumoens-le-Jux =

- Former municipality
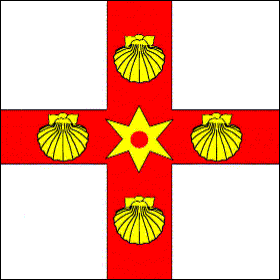
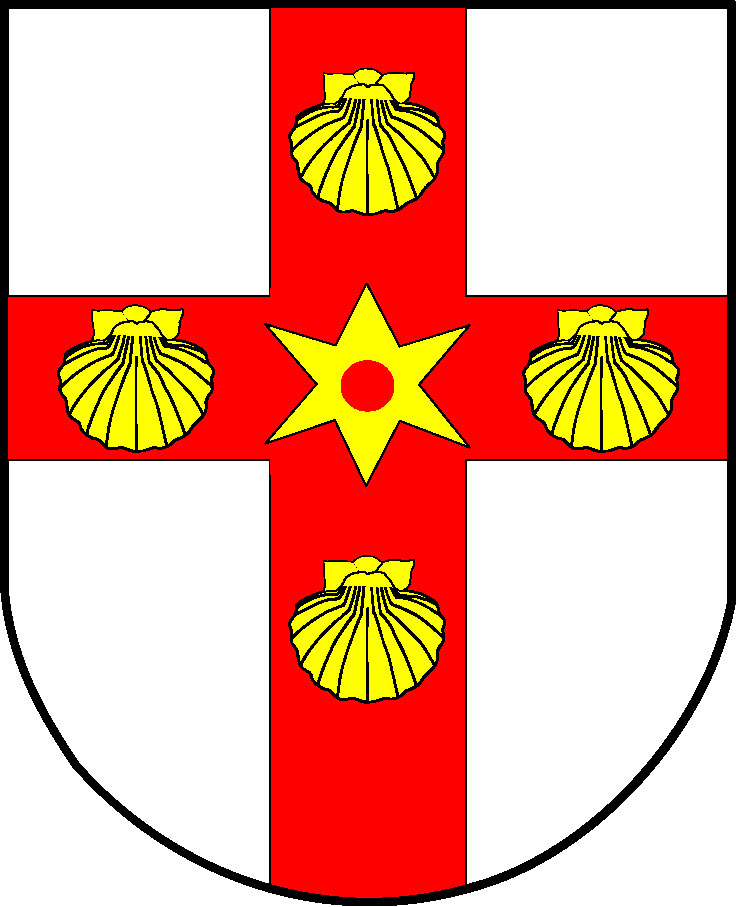
- Flag Coat of arms
- Location of Goumoens-le-Jux
- Location within Switzerland Location within Canton of Vaud
- Coordinates: 46°40′N 6°35′E
- Country: Switzerland
- Canton: Vaud
- District: Gros-de-Vaud

Area
  - Total: 1.28 km^{2} (0.49 sq mi)
- Elevation: 585 m (1,919 ft)

Population (December 2009)
  - Total: 45
  - Density: 35/km^{2} (91/sq mi)
- Time zone: UTC+01:00 (CET)
  - Summer (DST): UTC+02:00 (CEST)
- Postal code: 1376
- SFOS number: 5525
- ISO 3166 code: CH-VD
- Surrounded by: Bavois, Éclagnens, Goumoens-la-Ville, Oulens-sous-Échallens, Penthéréaz
- Website: Profile (in French), SFSO statistics

Goumoens-le-Jux is a former municipality in the district of Gros-de-Vaud in the canton of Vaud in Switzerland.

The municipalities of Éclagnens, Goumoens-la-Ville and Goumoens-le-Jux merged on 1 July 2011 into the new municipality of Goumoëns.

== History ==
Goumoens-le-Jux is first mentioned in 1447 as Gumoens lo Jux. During the Ancien Régime it was known as Le Craux.

== Geography ==
Goumoens-le-Jux has an area, as of 2009, of 1.28 square kilometers (0.49 sq mi). Of this area, 0.6 km^{2} (0.23 sq mi) or 46.9% is used for agricultural purposes, while 0.41 km^{2} (0.16 sq mi) or 32.0% is forested. Of the rest of the land, 0.27 km^{2} (0.10 sq mi) or 21.1% is settled (buildings or roads), 0.04 km^{2} (9.9 acres) or 3.1% is either rivers or lakes.

Housing and various-use buildings make up 1.6% and transportation infrastructure make up 2.3% of the developed area, while parks, green belts and sports fields make up 17.2%. The entirety of land designated as forestry is made up of heavy forests. Of the agricultural land, 30.5% is used for growing crops and 16.4% is pasture. All of the water in the municipality is flowing water.

The municipality was part of the Échallens District until it was dissolved on 31 August 2006, and Goumoens-le-Jux became part of the new district of Gros-de-Vaud.

The municipality is located in the Gros-de-Vaud region on the right bank of the Talent river.

== Coat of arms ==
The blazon of the municipal coat of arms is Argent, on a Cross Gules a Mullet pierced Or between four Escallops of the same.

== Demographics ==
Goumoens-le-Jux has a population (as of 2009) of 45. As of 2008, about 2.2% of the population are resident foreign nationals. Over the last 10 years (1999–2009) the population has changed at a rate of 50%. It has changed at a rate of 50% due to migration and at a rate of 0% due to births and deaths.

Most of the population (as of 2000) speaks French (33 or 97.1%) with the rest speaking Italian.

Of the population in the municipality 10 or about 29.4% were born in Goumoens-le-Jux and lived there in 2000. There were 18 or 52.9% who were born in the same canton, while 2 or 5.9% were born somewhere else in Switzerland, and 4 or 11.8% were born outside of Switzerland.

In 2008 there was 1 live birth to Swiss citizens. Discounting figures related to immigration and emigration, the population of Swiss citizens increased by 1 while the foreign population remained the same. The total Swiss population change in 2008 (from all sources, including moves across municipal borders) was an increase of 6 and the non-Swiss population remained the same. This represents a population growth rate of 20.7%.

The age distribution of the population (as of 2000) is children and teenagers (0–19 years old) make up 32.4% of the population, while adults (20–64 years old) make up 47.1% and seniors (over 64 years old) make up 20.6%.

As of 2000, there were 13 people who were single and never married in the municipality. There were 17 married individuals, 2 widows or widowers and 2 individuals who are divorced.

As of 2000 the average number of residents per living room was 0.54 which is fewer people per room than the cantonal average of 0.61 per room. In this case, a room is defined as space of a housing unit of at least 4 m^{2} (43 sq ft) as normal bedrooms, dining rooms, living rooms, kitchens and habitable cellars and attics. About 54.5% of the total households were owner-occupied, or in other words did not pay rent (though they may have a mortgage or a rent-to-own agreement).

As of 2000, there were 12 private households in the municipality, and an average of 2.8 persons per household. There were 2 households that consist of only one person and 2 households with five or more people. Out of a total of 12 households that answered this question, 16.7% were households made up of just one person. Of the rest of the households, there are 2 married couples without children, 6 married couples with children There were 2 households that were made up of unrelated people.

In 2000 there were 10 single-family homes (or 83.3% of the total) out of a total of 12 inhabited buildings. There were 2 multi-purpose buildings that were mostly used for housing (16.7%). Of the single-family homes 3 were built before 1919, while 2 were built between 1990 and 2000. The greatest number of single-family homes (4) were built between 1971 and 1980.

In 2000 there were 12 apartments in the municipality. The most common apartment size was 5 rooms of which there were 4. There were single room apartments and 7 apartments with five or more rooms. Of these apartments, a total of 11 apartments (91.7% of the total) were permanently occupied and one apartment was empty. As of 2009, the construction rate of new housing units was 44.4 new units per 1000 residents. The vacancy rate for the municipality, in 2010, was 0%.

The historical population is given in the following chart:

== Politics ==
In the 2007 federal election the most popular party was the SVP which received 39.51% of the vote. The next three most popular parties were the SP (26.54%), the Green Party (24.69%) and the FDP (4.32%). In the federal election, a total of 18 votes were cast, and the voter turnout was 85.7%.

== Economy ==
As of 2010, Goumoens-le-Jux had an unemployment rate of 4.1%. As of 2008, there were 3 people employed in the primary economic sector and about 2 businesses involved in this sector. No one was employed in the secondary sector. 9 people were employed in the tertiary sector, with 2 businesses in this sector. There were 14 residents of the municipality who were employed in some capacity, of which females made up 42.9% of the workforce.

In 2008 the total number of full-time equivalent jobs was 10. The number of jobs in the primary sector was 2, both in agriculture. There were no jobs in the secondary sector. The number of jobs in the tertiary sector was 8, of which 2 or 25.0% were in a hotel or restaurant.

In 2000, there were 6 workers who commuted into the municipality and 10 workers who commuted away. The municipality is a net exporter of workers, with about 1.7 workers leaving the municipality for every one entering. Of the working population, 0% used public transportation to get to work, and 85.7% used a private car.

== Religion ==
From the 2000 census, 2 or 5.9% were Roman Catholic, while 30 or 88.2% belonged to the Swiss Reformed Church. 2 (or about 5.88% of the population) belonged to no church, are agnostic or atheist.

== Education ==
In Goumoens-le-Jux about 5 or (14.7%) of the population have completed non-mandatory upper secondary education, and 8 or (23.5%) have completed additional higher education (either University or a Fachhochschule). Of the 8 who completed tertiary schooling, 62.5% were Swiss men, 37.5% were Swiss women.

As of 2000, there were 5 students from Goumoens-le-Jux who attended schools outside the municipality.
