= Goumoens-la-Ville =

- Former municipality
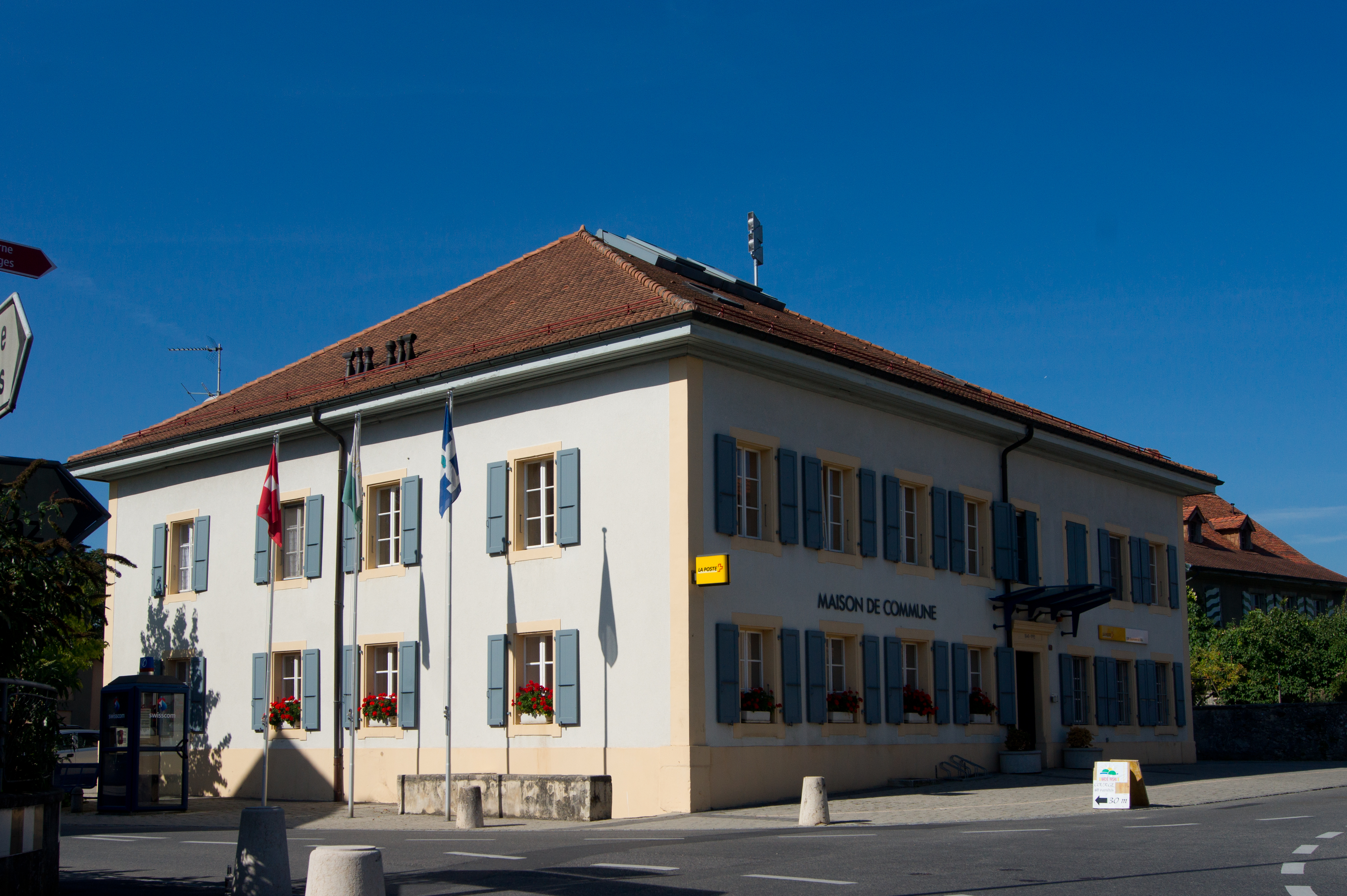
- Goumoens-la-Ville town hall

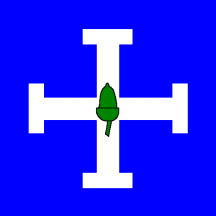
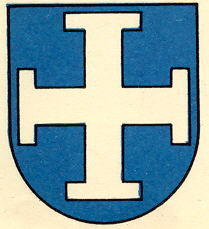
- Flag Coat of arms
- Location of Goumoens-la-Ville
- Location within Switzerland Location within Canton of Vaud
- Coordinates: 46°39′N 6°36′E
- Country: Switzerland
- Canton: Vaud
- District: Gros-de-Vaud

Area
  - Total: 7.27 km^{2} (2.81 sq mi)
- Elevation: 618 m (2,028 ft)

Population (December 2009)
  - Total: 650
  - Density: 89/km^{2} (230/sq mi)
- Time zone: UTC+01:00 (CET)
  - Summer (DST): UTC+02:00 (CEST)
- Postal code: 1376
- SFOS number: 5524
- ISO 3166 code: CH-VD
- Surrounded by: Échallens, Éclagnens, Goumoens-le-Jux, Penthéréaz, Saint-Barthélemy, Villars-le-Terroir
- Website: www.goumoens-la-ville.ch

Goumoens-la-Ville is a former municipality in the district of Gros-de-Vaud in the canton of Vaud in Switzerland.

The municipalities of Éclagnens, Goumoens-la-Ville and Goumoens-le-Jux merged on 1 July 2011 into the new municipality of Goumoëns.

== History ==
Goumoens-la-Ville is first mentioned in 1228 as Guimuens li vila.

== Geography ==
Goumoens-la-Ville has an area, as of 2009, of 7.27 square kilometers (2.81 sq mi). Of this area, 5.43 km^{2} (2.10 sq mi) or 74.7% is used for agricultural purposes, while 1.46 km^{2} (0.56 sq mi) or 20.1% is forested. Of the rest of the land, 0.37 km^{2} (0.14 sq mi) or 5.1% is settled (buildings or roads) and 0.01 km^{2} (2.5 acres) or 0.1% is unproductive land.

Of the built up area, housing and buildings made up 2.8% and transportation infrastructure made up 2.1%. Out of the forested land, all of the forested land area is covered with heavy forests. Of the agricultural land, 69.6% is used for growing crops and 4.1% is pastures.

The municipality was part of the Échallens District until it was dissolved on 31 August 2006, and Goumoens-la-Ville became part of the new district of Gros-de-Vaud.

The municipality is located in the Gros-de-Vaud region.

== Coat of arms ==
The blazon of the municipal coat of arms is Azure, on a Cross potent couped Argent an Acorn Vert.

== Demographics ==
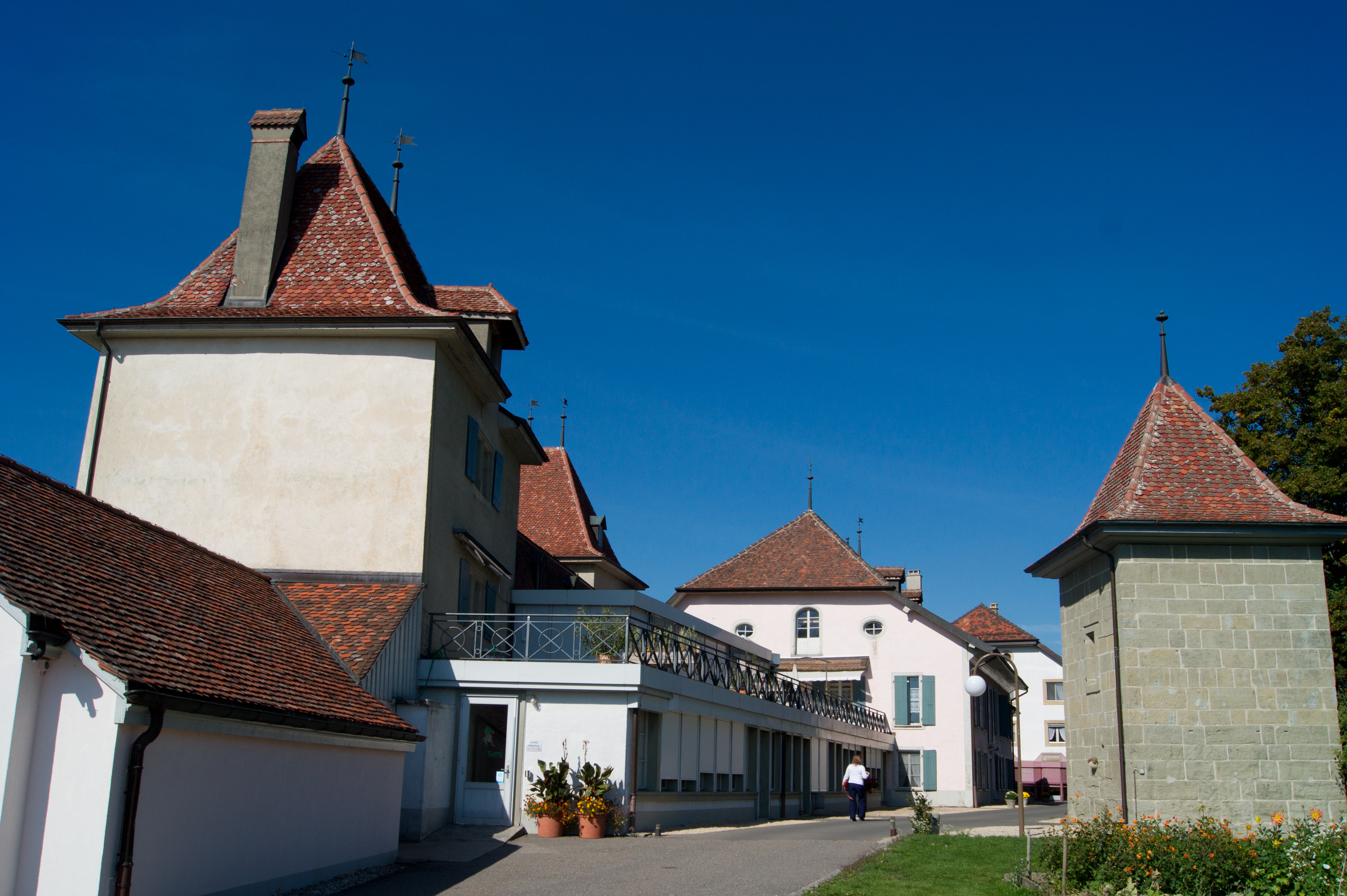
Castle and buildings in Goumoens-la-Ville

Goumoens-la-Ville has a population (as of 2009) of 650. As of 2008, 7.6% of the population are resident foreign nationals. Over the last 10 years (1999–2009 ) the population has changed at a rate of 7.3%. It has changed at a rate of 16.2% due to migration and at a rate of -9.1% due to births and deaths.

Most of the population (as of 2000) speaks French (586 or 95.9%), with German being second most common (10 or 1.6%) and English being third (4 or 0.7%). There are 3 people who speak Italian.

Of the population in the municipality 181 or about 29.6% were born in Goumoens-la-Ville and lived there in 2000. There were 267 or 43.7% who were born in the same canton, while 74 or 12.1% were born somewhere else in Switzerland, and 58 or 9.5% were born outside of Switzerland.

In 2008 there were 5 live births to Swiss citizens and 2 births to non-Swiss citizens, and in same time span there were 12 deaths of Swiss citizens. Ignoring immigration and emigration, the population of Swiss citizens decreased by 7 while the foreign population increased by 2. There was 1 Swiss man who emigrated from Switzerland. At the same time, there were 3 non-Swiss men and 4 non-Swiss women who immigrated from another country to Switzerland. The total Swiss population change in 2008 (from all sources, including moves across municipal borders) was a decrease of 14 and the non-Swiss population increased by 13 people. This represents a population growth rate of -0.2%.

The age distribution, as of 2009, in Goumoens-la-Ville is; 59 children or 9.1% of the population are between 0 and 9 years old and 82 teenagers or 12.6% are between 10 and 19. Of the adult population, 72 people or 11.1% of the population are between 20 and 29 years old. 87 people or 13.4% are between 30 and 39, 95 people or 14.6% are between 40 and 49, and 102 people or 15.7% are between 50 and 59. The senior population distribution is 59 people or 9.1% of the population are between 60 and 69 years old, 51 people or 7.8% are between 70 and 79, there are 35 people or 5.4% who are between 80 and 89, and there are 8 people or 1.2% who are 90 and older.

As of 2000, there were 247 people who were single and never married in the municipality. There were 288 married individuals, 46 widows or widowers and 30 individuals who are divorced.

As of 2000 the average number of residents per living room was 0.56 which is about equal to the cantonal average of 0.61 per room. In this case, a room is defined as space of a housing unit of at least 4 m^{2} (43 sq ft) as normal bedrooms, dining rooms, living rooms, kitchens and habitable cellars and attics. About 58.4% of the total households were owner occupied, or in other words did not pay rent (though they may have a mortgage or a rent-to-own agreement).

As of 2000, there were 224 private households in the municipality, and an average of 2.5 persons per household. There were 54 households that consist of only one person and 14 households with five or more people. Out of a total of 227 households that answered this question, 23.8% were households made up of just one person and there were 3 adults who lived with their parents. Of the rest of the households, there are 65 married couples without children, 90 married couples with children There were 8 single parents with a child or children. There were 4 households that were made up of unrelated people and 3 households that were made up of some sort of institution or another collective housing.

In 2000 there were 82 single family homes (or 54.7% of the total) out of a total of 150 inhabited buildings. There were 30 multi-family buildings (20.0%), along with 32 multi-purpose buildings that were mostly used for housing (21.3%) and 6 other use buildings (commercial or industrial) that also had some housing (4.0%). Of the single family homes 10 were built before 1919, while 30 were built between 1990 and 2000. The greatest number of single family homes (20) were built between 1981 and 1990. The most multi-family homes (16) were built before 1919 and the next most (4) were built between 1981 and 1990. There were 2 multi-family houses built between 1996 and 2000.

In 2000 there were 232 apartments in the municipality. The most common apartment size was 4 rooms of which there were 69. There were 6 single room apartments and 95 apartments with five or more rooms. Of these apartments, a total of 219 apartments (94.4% of the total) were permanently occupied, while 4 apartments (1.7%) were seasonally occupied and 9 apartments (3.9%) were empty. As of 2009, the construction rate of new housing units was 0 new units per 1000 residents. The vacancy rate for the municipality, in 2010, was 0%.

The historical population is given in the following chart:

== Politics ==
In the 2007 federal election the most popular party was the SVP which received 34.14% of the vote. The next three most popular parties were the Green Party (15.48%), the FDP (15.01%) and the SP (14.35%). In the federal election, a total of 244 votes were cast, and the voter turnout was 50.6%.

== Economy ==
As of 2010, Goumoens-la-Ville had an unemployment rate of 2.4%. As of 2008, there were 35 people employed in the primary economic sector and about 17 businesses involved in this sector. 54 people were employed in the secondary sector and there were 7 businesses in this sector. 123 people were employed in the tertiary sector, with 18 businesses in this sector. There were 322 residents of the municipality who were employed in some capacity, of which females made up 40.7% of the workforce.

In 2008 the total number of full-time equivalent jobs was 175. The number of jobs in the primary sector was 26, all of which were in agriculture. The number of jobs in the secondary sector was 48 of which 40 or (83.3%) were in manufacturing and 8 (16.7%) were in construction. The number of jobs in the tertiary sector was 101. In the tertiary sector; 13 or 12.9% were in the sale or repair of motor vehicles, 4 or 4.0% were in the movement and storage of goods, 2 or 2.0% were in the information industry, 11 or 10.9% were the insurance or financial industry, 1 was a technical professional or scientist, 3 or 3.0% were in education and 63 or 62.4% were in health care.

In 2000, there were 86 workers who commuted into the municipality and 228 workers who commuted away. The municipality is a net exporter of workers, with about 2.7 workers leaving the municipality for every one entering. Of the working population, 8.7% used public transportation to get to work, and 65.5% used a private car.

== Religion ==
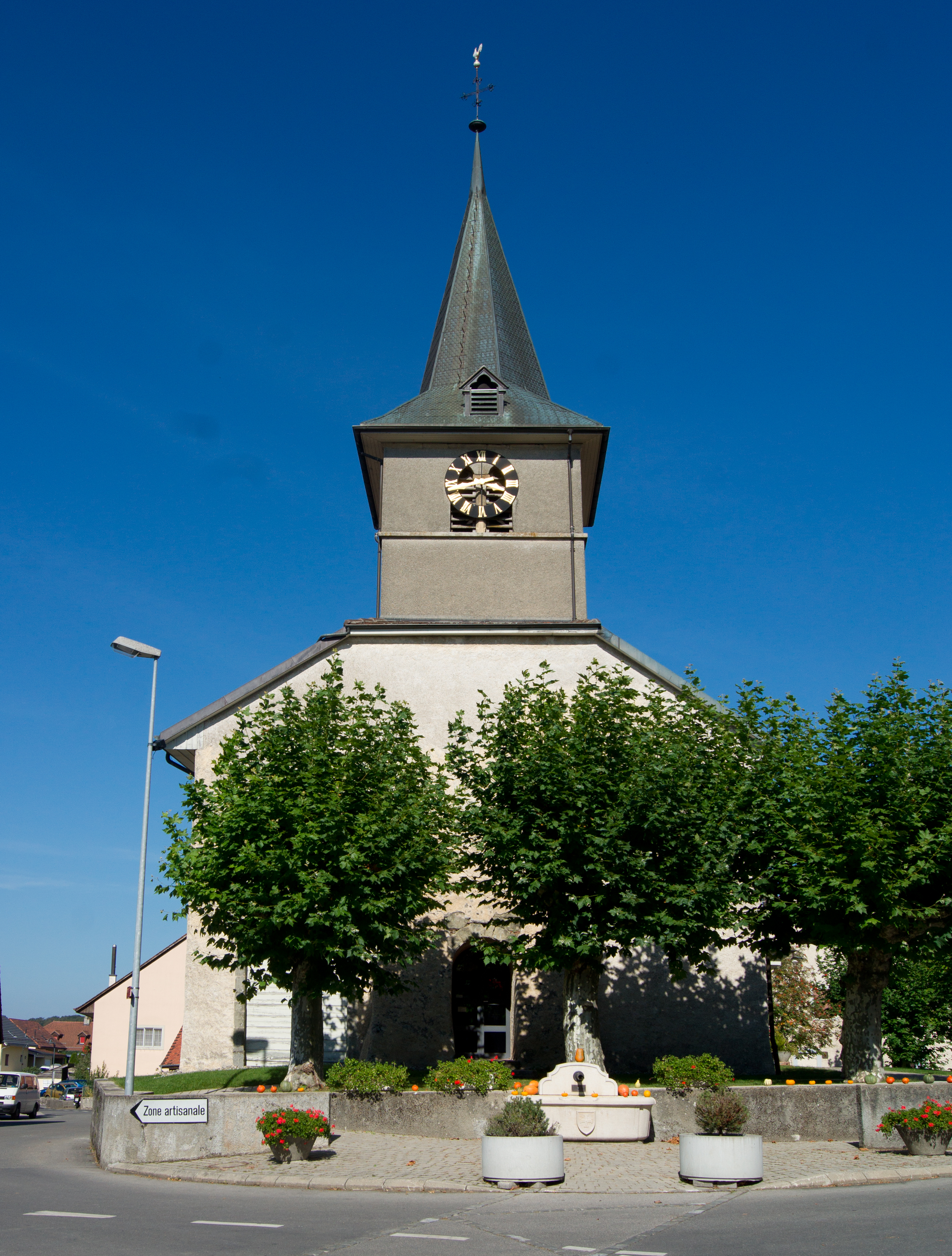
Church in Goumoens-la-Ville

From the 2000 census, 120 or 19.6% were Roman Catholic, while 428 or 70.0% belonged to the Swiss Reformed Church. Of the rest of the population, there was 1 member of an Orthodox church, and there were 4 individuals (or about 0.65% of the population) who belonged to another Christian church. 58 (or about 9.49% of the population) belonged to no church, are agnostic or atheist, and 2 individuals (or about 0.33% of the population) did not answer the question.

== Education ==
In Goumoens-la-Ville about 259 or (42.4%) of the population have completed non-mandatory upper secondary education, and 82 or (13.4%) have completed additional higher education (either University or a Fachhochschule). Of the 82 who completed tertiary schooling, 51.2% were Swiss men, 34.1% were Swiss women, 7.3% were non-Swiss men and 7.3% were non-Swiss women.

In the 2009/2010 school year there were a total of 68 students in the Goumoens-la-Ville school district. In the Vaud cantonal school system, two years of non-obligatory pre-school are provided by the political districts. During the school year, the political district provided pre-school care for a total of 296 children of which 96 children (32.4%) received subsidized pre-school care. The canton's primary school program requires students to attend for four years. There were 33 students in the municipal primary school program. The obligatory lower secondary school program lasts for six years and there were 34 students in those schools. There were also 1 students who were home schooled or attended another non-traditional school.

As of 2000, there were 16 students in Goumoens-la-Ville who came from another municipality, while 76 residents attended schools outside the municipality.
