= Saint-Barthélemy, Vaud =

Saint-Barthélemy
- Municipality
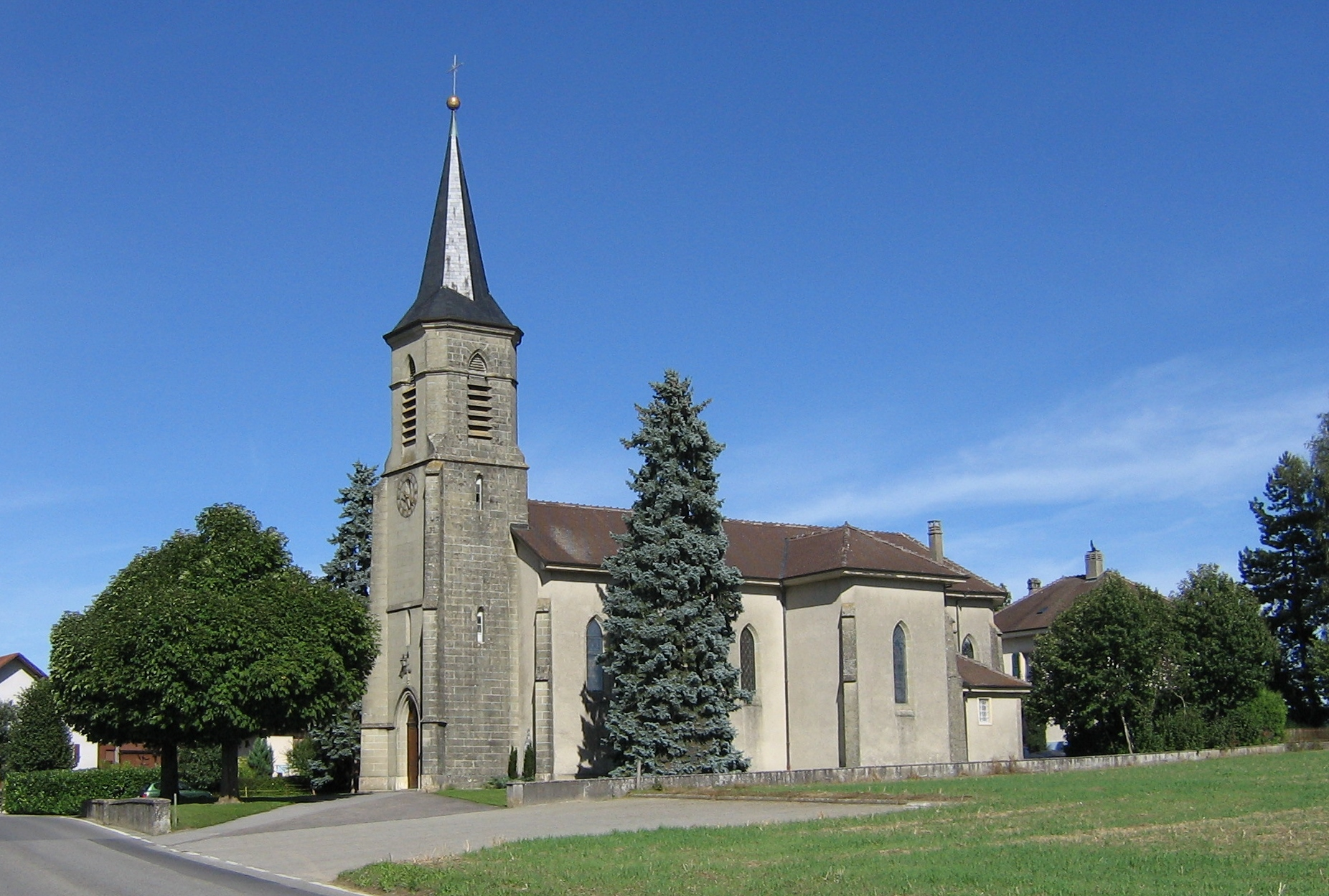

- Flag Coat of arms
- Location of Saint-Barthélemy
- Location within Switzerland Location within Canton of Vaud
- Coordinates: 46°38′N 6°36′E
- Country: Switzerland
- Canton: Vaud
- District: Gros-de-Vaud

Government
  - Mayor: Syndic

Area
  - Total: 4.12 km^{2} (1.59 sq mi)
- Elevation: 593 m (1,946 ft)

Population (December 2004)
  - Total: 630
  - Density: 150/km^{2} (400/sq mi)
- Time zone: UTC+01:00 (CET)
  - Summer (DST): UTC+02:00 (CEST)
- Postal code: 1040
- SFOS number: 5535
- ISO 3166 code: CH-VD
- Surrounded by: Assens, Bettens, Bioley-Orjulaz, Échallens, Éclagnens, Goumoens-la-Ville, Oulens-sous-Échallens
- Website: st-barthelemy.ch

Saint-Barthélemy is a municipality in the district of Gros-de-Vaud in the canton of Vaud in Switzerland.

== History ==
Saint-Barthélemy is first mentioned in 1265 as capellam sancti Bartholomei.

== Geography ==
Aerial view (1964)

Saint-Barthélemy is just 10 minutes northeast of Lausanne, the capital of the canton, and 3 km (1.9 mi) west of Échallens, the capital of the district. It is situated in the bread-basket agricultural district known as the Gros-de-Vaud. It is traversed by the river Talent.

The landscape is a hilly high plateau between the watersheds of Lake Geneva to the south and Lake Neuchâtel to the north.

Saint-Barthélemy has an area, as of 2009, of 4.12 square kilometres (1.59 sq mi). Of this area, 3.34 km^{2} (1.29 sq mi) or 81.1% is used for agricultural purposes, while 0.49 km^{2} (0.19 sq mi) or 11.9% is forested. Of the rest of the land, 0.3 km^{2} (0.12 sq mi) or 7.3% is settled (buildings or roads), 0.01 km^{2} (2.5 acres) or 0.2% is either rivers or lakes.

Of the built up area, housing and buildings made up 4.1% and transportation infrastructure made up 2.4%. Out of the forested land, 10.2% of the total land area is heavily forested and 1.7% is covered with orchards or small clusters of trees. Of the agricultural land, 66.5% is used for growing crops and 14.1% is pastures. All the water in the municipality is flowing water.

The municipality was part of the Échallens District until it was dissolved on 31 August 2006, and Saint-Barthélemy became part of the new district of Gros-de-Vaud.

The municipality is located in the Gros-de-Vaud region, on the Échallens-Cossonay road. It consists of the village of Saint-Barthélemy and the hamlet of Bretigny.

== Coat of arms ==
The blazon of the municipal coat of arms is Per pale Argent and Gules a Castle surrounded with four Escallops 1-2-1 counterchanged.

== Demographics ==
Saint-Barthélemy has a population (as of December 2020) of 783. As of 2008, 10.4% of the population were resident foreign nationals. From 1999 to 2009 the population changed at a rate of 14.9%. Of this, 7.7% was due to migration and 6.9% due to births and deaths.

The vast majority of the population speaks French (593 or 94.3% in 2000), with German being second most common (22 or 3.5%) and Italian being third (6 or 1.0%).

Of the population in the municipality 188 or about 29.9% were born in Saint-Barthélemy and lived there in 2000. There were 246 or 39.1% who were born in the same canton, while 90 or 14.3% were born somewhere else in Switzerland, and 86 or 13.7% were born outside of Switzerland.

In 2008 there were 4 live births to Swiss citizens and were 3 deaths of Swiss citizens. Ignoring immigration and emigration, the population of Swiss citizens increased by 1 while the foreign population remained the same. There was 1 Swiss woman who emigrated from Switzerland. At the same time, there was 1 non-Swiss man and 4 non-Swiss women who immigrated from another country to Switzerland. The total Swiss population change in 2008 (from all sources, including moves across municipal borders) was an increase of 14 and the non-Swiss population increased by 6 people. This represents a population growth rate of 3.0%.

The age distribution, as of 2009, in Saint-Barthélemy is; 83 children or 11.9% of the population are between 0 and 9 years old and 103 teenagers or 14.7% are between 10 and 19. Of the adult population, 77 people or 11.0% of the population are between 20 and 29 years old. 107 people or 15.3% are between 30 and 39, 132 people or 18.9% are between 40 and 49, and 87 people or 12.4% are between 50 and 59. The senior population distribution is 60 people or 8.6% of the population are between 60 and 69 years old, 32 people or 4.6% are between 70 and 79, there are 17 people or 2.4% who are between 80 and 89, and there are 2 people or 0.3% who are 90 and older.

As of 2000, there were 322 people who were single and never married in the municipality. There were 283 married individuals, 12 widows or widowers and 12 individuals who are divorced.

As of 2000, there were 200 private households in the municipality, and an average of 2.9 persons per household. There were 37 households that consist of only one person and 27 households with five or more people. Out of a total of 207 households that answered this question, 17.9% were households made up of just one person and there were 2 adults who lived with their parents. Of the rest of the households, there are 50 married couples without children, 99 married couples with children There were 7 single parents with a child or children. There were 5 households that were made up of unrelated people and 7 households that were made up of some sort of institution or another collective housing.

In 2000 there were 54 single family homes (or 47.0% of the total) out of a total of 115 inhabited buildings. There were 32 multi-family buildings (27.8%), along with 19 multi-purpose buildings that were mostly used for housing (16.5%) and 10 other use buildings (commercial or industrial) that also had some housing (8.7%). Of the single family homes 10 were built before 1919, while 16 were built between 1990 and 2000. The greatest number of single family homes (16) were built between 1981 and 1990. The most multi-family homes (9) were built before 1919 and the next most (5) were built between 1981 and 1990. There were 3 multi-family houses built between 1996 and 2000.

In 2000 there were 200 apartments in the municipality. The most common apartment size was 4 rooms of which there were 66. There were 2 single room apartments and 80 apartments with five or more rooms. Of these apartments, a total of 188 apartments (94.0% of the total) were permanently occupied, while 10 apartments (5.0%) were seasonally occupied and 2 apartments (1.0%) were empty. As of 2009, the construction rate of new housing units was 20 new units per 1000 residents. The vacancy rate for the municipality, in 2010, was 0%.

The historical population is given in the following chart:

== Politics ==
In the 2007 federal election the most popular party was the SVP which received 22.38% of the vote. The next three most popular parties were the SP (20.34%), the CVP (17.74%) and the FDP (10.15%). In the federal election, a total of 188 votes were cast, and the voter turnout was 43.4%.

== Economy ==
As of 2010, Saint-Barthélemy had an unemployment rate of 3.4%. As of 2008, there were 32 people employed in the primary economic sector and about 16 businesses involved in this sector. 28 people were employed in the secondary sector and there were 8 businesses in this sector. 170 people were employed in the tertiary sector, with 16 businesses in this sector. There were 303 residents of the municipality who were employed in some capacity, of which females made up 46.2% of the workforce.

In 2008 the total number of full-time equivalent jobs was 165. The number of jobs in the primary sector was 20, all of which were in agriculture. The number of jobs in the secondary sector was 25 of which 17 or (68.0%) were in manufacturing and 8 (32.0%) were in construction. The number of jobs in the tertiary sector was 120. In the tertiary sector; 8 or 6.7% were in wholesale or retail sales or the repair of motor vehicles, 1 was in the movement and storage of goods, 5 or 4.2% were in a hotel or restaurant, 2 or 1.7% were technical professionals or scientists and 95 or 79.2% were in health care.

In 2000, there were 95 workers who commuted into the municipality and 235 workers who commuted away. The municipality is a net exporter of workers, with about 2.5 workers leaving the municipality for every one entering. Of the working population, 10.9% used public transportation to get to work, and 66.3% used a private car.

== Religion ==
From the 2000 census, 334 or 53.1% were Roman Catholic, while 173 or 27.5% belonged to the Swiss Reformed Church. Of the rest of the population, there was 1 member of an Orthodox church, and there were 17 individuals (or about 2.70% of the population) who belonged to another Christian church. There were 4 (or about 0.64% of the population) who were Muslim. There was 1 person who was Hindu. 86 (or about 13.67% of the population) belonged to no church, are agnostic or atheist, and 21 individuals (or about 3.34% of the population) did not answer the question.

== Education ==
In Saint-Barthélemy about 223 or (35.5%) of the population have completed non-mandatory upper secondary education, and 56 or (8.9%) have completed additional higher education (either university or a Fachhochschule). Of the 56 who completed tertiary schooling, 51.8% were Swiss men, 37.5% were Swiss women.

As of 2000, there was one student in Saint-Barthélemy who came from another municipality, while 104 residents attended schools outside the municipality.

== Personalities ==
It is the residence of the tennis player Stanislas Wawrinka, who won a gold medal in men's doubles, partnering with Roger Federer at the 2008 Olympics and won the 2014 Australian Open title in 2014, and Roland Garros, the French Open title in 2015, and the US Open in 2016, winning in four sets over the number one seeded player, Novak Djokovic. The football manager and former Swiss international player Lucien Favre was born there.
