= Jacques François de Goumoëns =

Swiss military officer (1667–1729)

- Born: 2 July 1667; Orbe, Switzerland
- Died: 10 March 1729 (aged 61); Maastricht, Netherlands
- Military career
- Allegiance: Kingdom of France; Dutch Republic; Bern
- Rank: Brigadier
- Commands: Bernese Stürler regiment (later Goumoëns regiment)
- Conflicts: War of the Spanish Succession; Jacobite rising of 1715

Jacques François de Goumoëns (2 July 1667 in Orbe – 10 March 1729 in Maastricht) was a Swiss mercenary. A Protestant burgher of Bern and Orbe from 1686, he was lord of Corcelles and Oppens.

== Biography ==
He was the son of Frédéric, lord of Goumoëns-la-Ville, and of Louise Christin. He married Judith Darbonnier, daughter of Louis Frédéric, lord of Dizy and castellan of Orbe.

Goumoëns began his military career in French service in the Erlach regiment, before transferring to Dutch service, in which he took part in several battles of the War of the Spanish Succession. In 1715 he joined the armed expedition organized by the stadtholder to support Great Britain against the Jacobite rebels. As colonel-proprietor of the Bernese Stürler regiment, he gave the unit his name in 1722, and in 1727 he was promoted to brigadier.

== Bibliography ==
- Fonds de Goumoëns, ACV.
