= Montanaire =

- Municipality
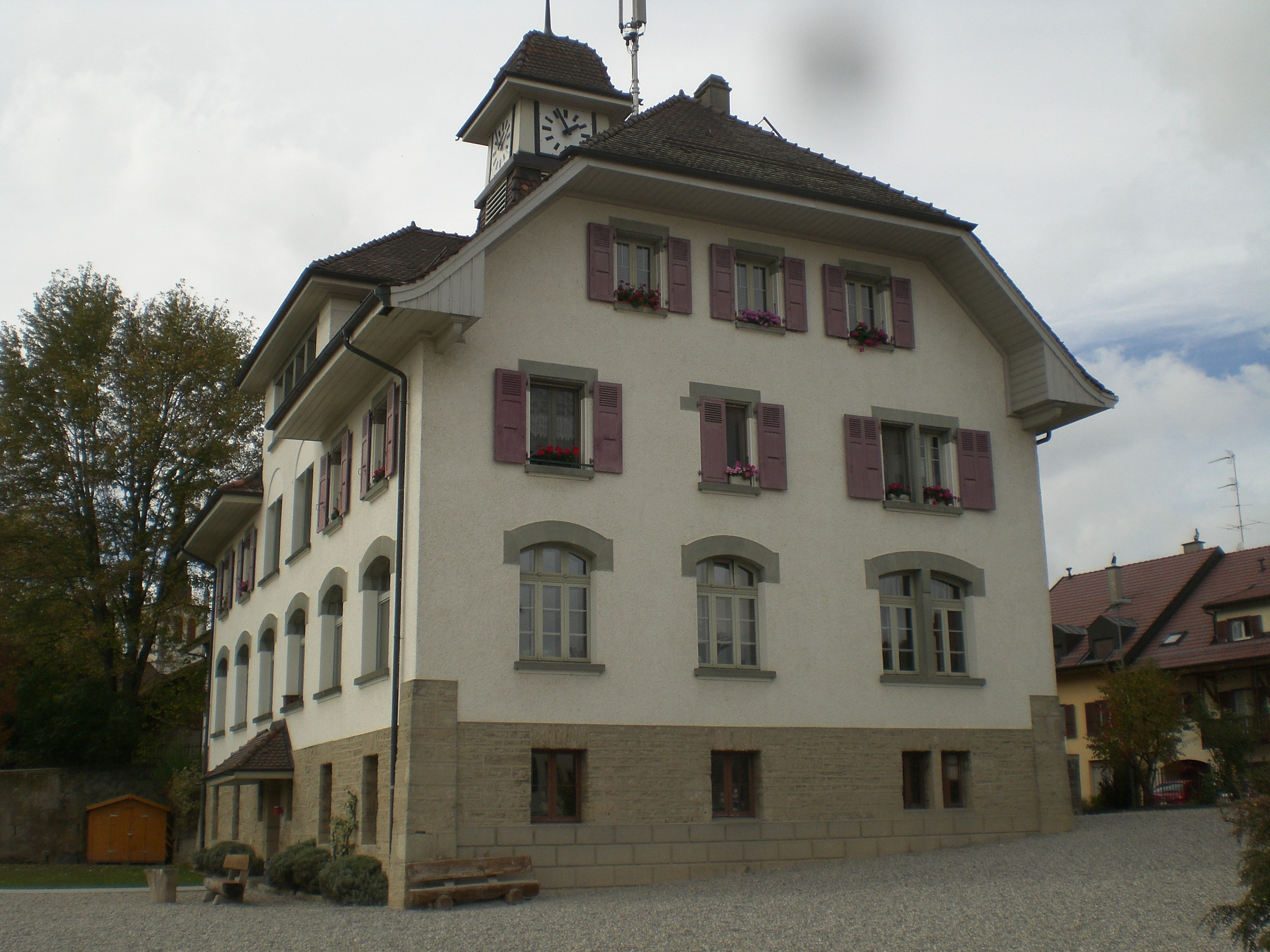
- Saint-Cierges village school

- Flag Coat of arms
- Location of Montanaire
- Location within Switzerland Location within Canton of Vaud
- Coordinates: 46°40′N 6°44′E
- Country: Switzerland
- Canton: Vaud
- District: Gros-de-Vaud

Government
  - Mayor: Syndic

Area
  - Total: 33.48 km^{2} (12.93 sq mi)

Population (2011)
  - Total: 2,324
  - Density: 69.41/km^{2} (179.8/sq mi)
- Time zone: UTC+01:00 (CET)
  - Summer (DST): UTC+02:00 (CEST)
- Postal code: 1063 / 1064 / 1409 / 1410 / 1515
- SFOS number: 5693
- ISO 3166 code: CH-VD
- Surrounded by: Boulens, Moudon, Sottens
- Website: http://www.montanaire.ch Profile (in French), SFSO statistics

Montanaire (French pronunciation: [mɔ̃tanɛʁ]) is a municipality in the district Gros-de-Vaud in the canton of Vaud in Switzerland. The municipalities of Chapelle-sur-Moudon, Correvon, Denezy, Martherenges, Neyruz-sur-Moudon, Peyres-Possens, Saint-Cierges, Thierrens and Chanéaz merged on 1 January 2013 into the new municipality of Montanaire.

== History ==
Chapelle-sur-Moudon is first mentioned in 1177 as Capellam. In 1228 it was mentioned as Capella Vualdana. Under Bernese administration, it was known as Chapelle Vaudanne. After the creation of the Canton of Vaud (1798) it was known as Chapelle (VD) until 1953. Correvon is first mentioned in 1166 as Correuont. Denezy is first mentioned in 929 as villare Donaciaco. In 1142 it was mentioned as Danisei. Martherenges is first mentioned in the 15th Century as Martherenges. Neyruz-sur-Moudon is first mentioned in 1147 as Noeruls and Nuruls. It was first called Neyruz-sur-Moudon in 1953. Peyres is first mentioned in 1200 as Pairi. Possens was mentioned in 1230 as Pussens. Saint-Cierges is first mentioned around 1145–54 as de sancto Sergio. In 1166 it was mentioned as de sancto Ciriaco. Thierrens is first mentioned around 1004–07 as Teoderinco. Chanéaz is first mentioned in 1184 as Chafneya.

== Geography ==
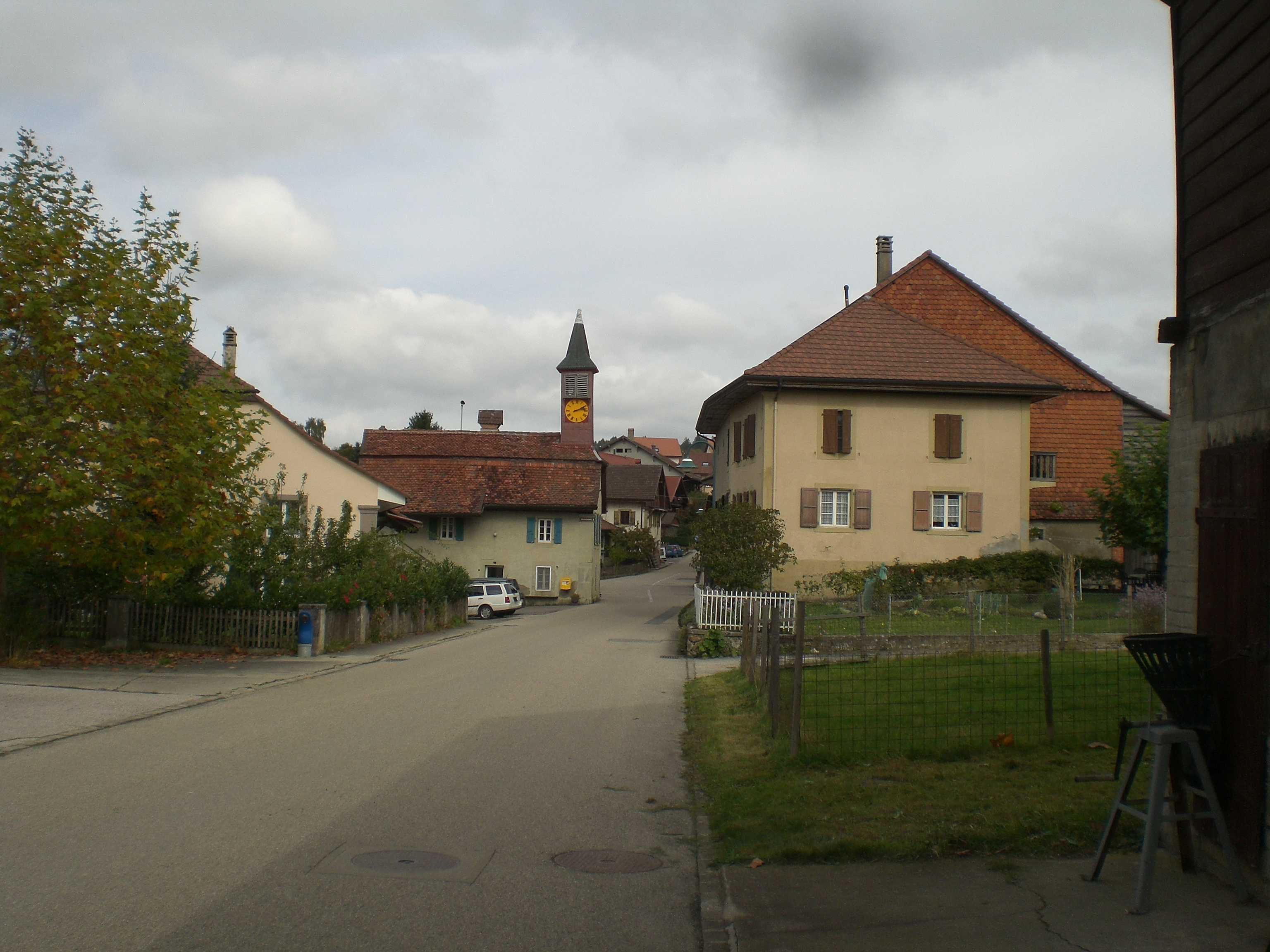
Chapelle-sur-Moudon village

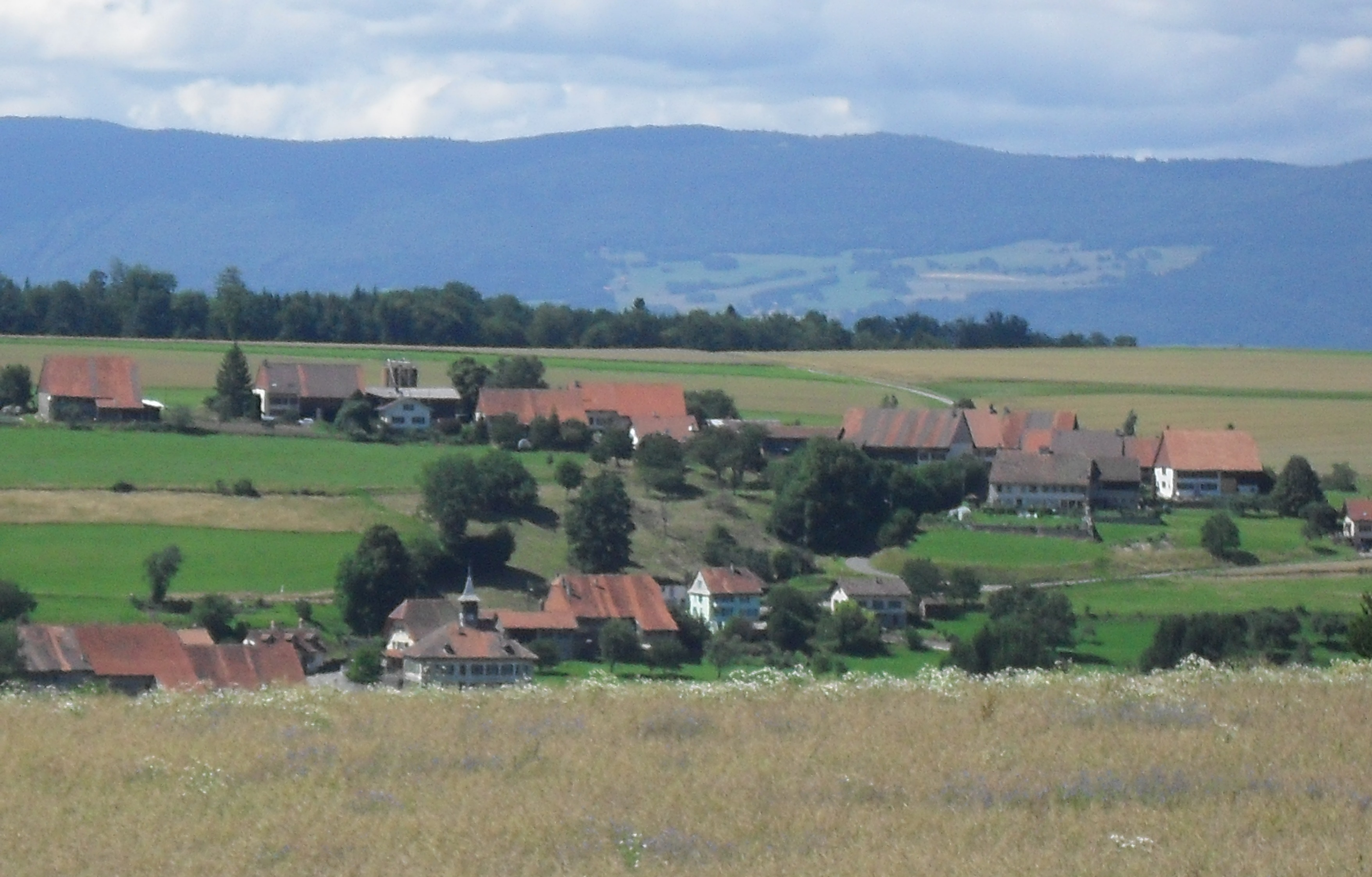
Denezy village

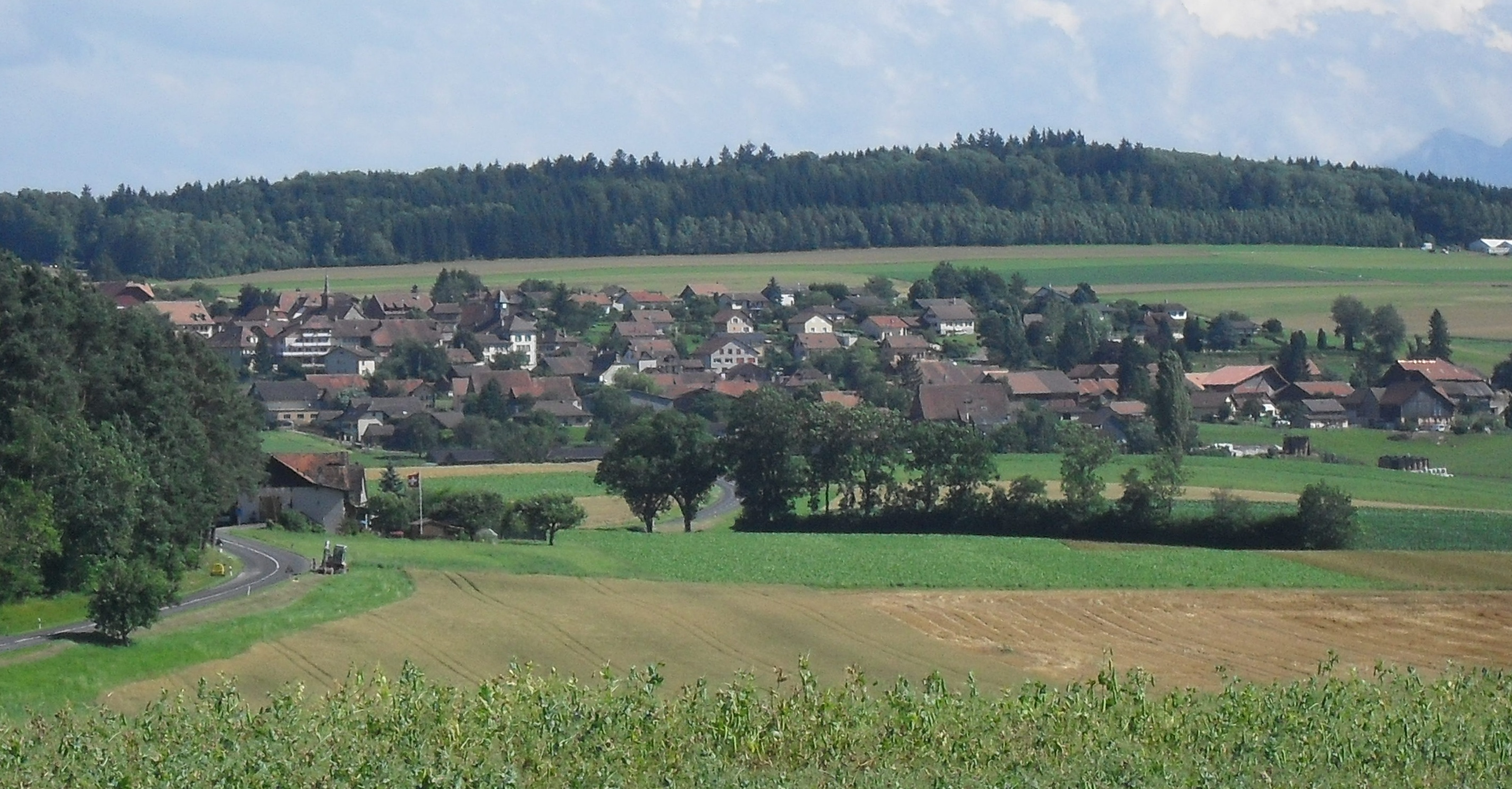
Thierrens village and surrounding fields

The former municipalities that make up Montanaire had an area of 33.5 km^{2} (12.93 sq mi). Eight of the former municipalities came from the Gros-de-Vaud District, while Chanéaz was from the Jura-Nord Vaudois District.

Chapelle-sur-Moudon had an area, as of 2009, of 4.6 square kilometers (1.8 mi^{2}). Of this area, 3.77 km^{2} (1.46 mi^{2}) or 81.4% is used for agricultural purposes, while 0.6 km^{2} (0.23 mi^{2}) or 13.0% is forested. Of the rest of the land, 0.3 km^{2} (0.12 mi^{2}) or 6.5% is settled (buildings or roads). The former municipality is located on the left side of the Broye valley. It consists of the village of Chapelle-sur-Moudon and the hamlet of Combe.

Correvon had an area, as of 2009, of 2.2 square kilometers (0.85 mi^{2}). Of this area, 1.86 km^{2} (0.72 mi^{2}) or 83.0% is used for agricultural purposes, while 0.28 km^{2} (0.11 mi^{2}) or 12.5% is forested. Of the rest of the land, 0.05 km^{2} (12 acres) or 2.2% is settled (buildings or roads). The former municipality is located on a plateau between the Broye and Mentue rivers.

Denezy had an area, as of 2009, of 3.8 square kilometers (1.5 mi^{2}). Of this area, 2.73 km^{2} (1.05 mi^{2}) or 72.0% is used for agricultural purposes, while 0.88 km^{2} (0.34 mi^{2}) or 23.2% is forested. Of the rest of the land, 0.2 km^{2} (0.077 mi^{2}) or 5.3% is settled (buildings or roads). The former municipality is located on the road between Lausanne and Estavayer.

Martherenges had an area, as of 2009, of 0.8 square kilometers (0.31 mi^{2}). Of this area, 0.5 km^{2} (0.19 mi^{2}) or 60.2% is used for agricultural purposes, while 0.29 km^{2} (0.11 mi^{2}) or 34.9% is forested. Of the rest of the land, 0.04 km^{2} (9.9 acres) or 4.8% is settled (buildings or roads). The small former municipality is located on a hill on the left side of the Broye valley.

Neyruz-sur-Moudon had an area, as of 2009, of 3.5 square kilometers (1.4 mi^{2}). Of this area, 2.46 km^{2} (0.95 mi^{2}) or 69.9% is used for agricultural purposes, while 0.93 km^{2} (0.36 mi^{2}) or 26.4% is forested. Of the rest of the land, 0.12 km^{2} (30 acres) or 3.4% is settled (buildings or roads) and 0.01 km^{2} (2.5 acres) or 0.3% is unproductive land. The former municipality is located along the Moudon to Yverdon-les-Bains road. It consists of the haufendorf village (an irregular, unplanned and quite closely packed village, built around a central square) of Neyruz-sur-Moudon and the settlements of La Praire, Les Rutannes and Le Moulin Tardy.

Peyres-Possens had an area, as of 2009, of 1.9 square kilometers (0.73 mi^{2}). Of this area, 0.94 km^{2} (0.36 mi^{2}) or 49.0% is used for agricultural purposes, while 0.76 km^{2} (0.29 mi^{2}) or 39.6% is forested. Of the rest of the land, 0.19 km^{2} (0.073 mi^{2}) or 9.9% is settled (buildings or roads), 0.01 km^{2} (2.5 acres) or 0.5% is either rivers or lakes. The former municipality is located on a hilly plateau in the mid-Jorat to the right of the Mentue river. It consists of the villages of Peyres and Possens.

Saint-Cierges had an area, as of 2009, of 6.4 square kilometers (2.5 mi^{2}). Of this area, 3.94 km^{2} (1.52 mi^{2}) or 61.2% is used for agricultural purposes, while 2.18 km^{2} (0.84 mi^{2}) or 33.9% is forested. Of the rest of the land, 0.31 km^{2} (0.12 mi^{2}) or 4.8% is settled (buildings or roads) and 0.02 km^{2} (4.9 acres) or 0.3% is unproductive land. The former municipality is located on a plateau in the Jorat between the Broye and Mentue rivers. It consists of the village of Saint-Cierges and the hamlets of Corrençon, Pré-de-Place and Solitude.

Thierrens had an area, as of 2009, of 8.7 square kilometers (3.4 mi^{2}). Of this area, 6.2 km^{2} (2.4 mi^{2}) or 71.1% is used for agricultural purposes, while 1.97 km^{2} (0.76 mi^{2}) or 22.6% is forested. Of the rest of the land, 0.57 km^{2} (0.22 mi^{2}) or 6.5% is settled (buildings or roads). The former municipality is located at the crossroads of the Moudon-Yverdon and Echallens-Payerne roads.

Chanéaz had an area, as of 2009, of 1.4 square kilometers (0.54 mi^{2}). Of this area, 1.01 km^{2} (0.39 mi^{2}) or 72.7% is used for agricultural purposes, while 0.36 km^{2} (0.14 mi^{2}) or 25.9% is forested. Of the rest of the land, 0.04 km^{2} (9.9 acres) or 2.9% is settled (buildings or roads). The former municipality is located in the northern Jorat plateau with a small enclave between Correvon and Vuissens.

== Demographics ==
The total population of Montanaire (as of December 2020) is 2,777.

== Historic population ==
The historical population is given in the following chart:

== Sights ==
The entire village of Denezy is designated as part of the Inventory of Swiss Heritage Sites.

== Weather ==
Thierrens has an average of 126.5 days of rain or snow per year and on average receives 1,094 mm (43.1 in) of precipitation. The wettest month is June during which time Thierrens receives an average of 111 mm (4.4 in) of rain or snow. During this month there is precipitation for an average of 11.3 days. The month with the most days of precipitation is May, with an average of 13.2, but with only 102 mm (4.0 in) of rain or snow. The driest month of the year is February with an average of 76 mm (3.0 in) of precipitation over 10.2 days.
