= Saint-Cierges =

- Former municipality
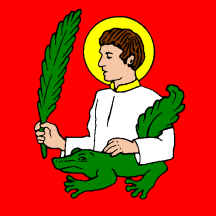
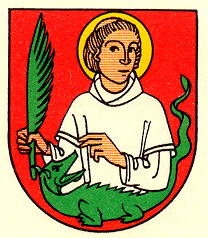
- Flag Coat of arms
- Location of Saint-Cierges
- Location within Switzerland Location within Canton of Vaud
- Coordinates: 46°41′N 6°44′E
- Country: Switzerland
- Canton: Vaud
- District: Gros-de-Vaud

Area
  - Total: 6.44 km^{2} (2.49 sq mi)
- Elevation: 758 m (2,487 ft)

Population (2011)
  - Total: 472
  - Density: 73.3/km^{2} (190/sq mi)
- Time zone: UTC+01:00 (CET)
  - Summer (DST): UTC+02:00 (CEST)
- Postal code: 1064
- SFOS number: 5685
- ISO 3166 code: CH-VD
- Surrounded by: Bercher, Boulens, Chapelle-sur-Moudon, Moudon, Neyruz-sur-Moudon, Ogens, Thierrens
- Website: www.saint-cierges.ch

Saint-Cierges is a former municipality in the district of Gros-de-Vaud in the canton of Vaud in Switzerland. Its name refers to Saint Cyriacus, who is the town's patron saint. The municipalities of Chapelle-sur-Moudon, Correvon, Denezy, Martherenges, Neyruz-sur-Moudon, Peyres-Possens, Saint-Cierges, Thierrens and Chanéaz merged on 1 January 2013 into the new municipality of Montanaire.

== History ==
Saint-Cierges is first mentioned around 1145-54 as de sancto Sergio. In 1166 it was mentioned as de sancto Ciriaco.

== Geography ==
Saint-Cierges had an area, as of 2009, of 6.4 square kilometers (2.5 mi^{2}). Of this area, 3.94 km^{2} (1.52 mi^{2}) or 61.2% is used for agricultural purposes, while 2.18 km^{2} (0.84 mi^{2}) or 33.9% is forested. Of the rest of the land, 0.31 km^{2} (0.12 mi^{2}) or 4.8% is settled (buildings or roads) and 0.02 km^{2} (4.9 acres) or 0.3% is unproductive land.

Of the built up area, housing and buildings made up 3.1% and transportation infrastructure made up 1.2%. Out of the forested land, all of the forested land area is covered with heavy forests. Of the agricultural land, 44.9% is used for growing crops and 14.9% is pastures, while 1.4% is used for orchards or vine crops.

The former municipality was part of the Moudon District until it was dissolved on 31 August 2006, and Saint-Cierges became part of the new district of Gros-de-Vaud.

The former municipality is located on a plateau in the Jorat between the Broye and Mentue rivers. It consists of the village of Saint-Cierges and the hamlets of Corrençon, Pré-de-Place and Solitude.

== Coat of arms ==
The blazon of the municipal coat of arms is Gules, a semi of Saint Cyriaque proper clad Argent, haloed Or, holding in dexter a Palm Branch Vert, in sinister an imaginary reptile of the same.

== Demographics ==
Saint-Cierges had a population (as of 2011) of 472. As of 2008, 5.8% of the population are resident foreign nationals. Over the last 10 years (1999–2009 ) the population has changed at a rate of 11.4%. It has changed at a rate of 9% due to migration and at a rate of 3.1% due to births and deaths.

Most of the population (as of 2000) speaks French (377 or 91.7%), with German being second most common (18 or 4.4%) and English being third (6 or 1.5%). There are 3 people who speak Italian.

Of the population in the municipality 112 or about 27.3% were born in Saint-Cierges and lived there in 2000. There were 179 or 43.6% who were born in the same canton, while 57 or 13.9% were born somewhere else in Switzerland, and 44 or 10.7% were born outside of Switzerland.

In 2008 there were 4 live births to Swiss citizens and 1 non-Swiss citizen death. Ignoring immigration and emigration, the population of Swiss citizens increased by 4 while the foreign population decreased by 1. There was 1 Swiss man who emigrated from Switzerland and 1 Swiss woman who immigrated back to Switzerland. At the same time, there were 1 non-Swiss woman who immigrated from another country to Switzerland. The total Swiss population change in 2008 (from all sources, including moves across municipal borders) was a decrease of 2 and the non-Swiss population decreased by 3 people. This represents a population growth rate of -1.1%.

The age distribution, as of 2009, in Saint-Cierges is; 51 children or 11.1% of the population are between 0 and 9 years old and 55 teenagers or 12.0% are between 10 and 19. Of the adult population, 53 people or 11.5% of the population are between 20 and 29 years old. 68 people or 14.8% are between 30 and 39, 66 people or 14.4% are between 40 and 49, and 78 people or 17.0% are between 50 and 59. The senior population distribution is 49 people or 10.7% of the population are between 60 and 69 years old, 27 people or 5.9% are between 70 and 79, there are 12 people or 2.6% who are between 80 and 89.

As of 2000, there were 174 people who were single and never married in the municipality. There were 205 married individuals, 16 widows or widowers and 16 individuals who are divorced.

As of 2000, there were 160 private households in the municipality, and an average of 2.5 persons per household. There were 43 households that consist of only one person and 18 households with five or more people. Out of a total of 165 households that answered this question, 26.1% were households made up of just one person. Of the rest of the households, there are 53 married couples without children, 52 married couples with children There were 10 single parents with a child or children. There were 2 households that were made up of unrelated people and 5 households that were made up of some sort of institution or another collective housing.

In 2000 there were 57 single family homes (or 48.7% of the total) out of a total of 117 inhabited buildings. There were 22 multi-family buildings (18.8%), along with 28 multi-purpose buildings that were mostly used for housing (23.9%) and 10 other use buildings (commercial or industrial) that also had some housing (8.5%). Of the single family homes 21 were built before 1919, while 6 were built between 1990 and 2000. The most multi-family homes (13) were built before 1919 and the next most (4) were built between 1919 and 1945.

In 2000 there were 174 apartments in the municipality. The most common apartment size was 4 rooms of which there were 35. There were 9 single room apartments and 77 apartments with five or more rooms. Of these apartments, a total of 155 apartments (89.1% of the total) were permanently occupied, while 14 apartments (8.0%) were seasonally occupied and 5 apartments (2.9%) were empty. As of 2009, the construction rate of new housing units was 2.2 new units per 1000 residents. The vacancy rate for the municipality, in 2010, was 1.55%.

The historical population is given in the following chart:

== Politics ==
In the 2007 federal election the most popular party was the SVP which received 24.78% of the vote. The next three most popular parties were the Green Party (16.8%), the SP (16.67%) and the FDP (15.3%). In the federal election, a total of 180 votes were cast, and the voter turnout was 55.6%.

== Economy ==
As of 2010, Saint-Cierges had an unemployment rate of 3.5%. As of 2008, there were 49 people employed in the primary economic sector and about 14 businesses involved in this sector. 12 people were employed in the secondary sector and there were 3 businesses in this sector. 27 people were employed in the tertiary sector, with 12 businesses in this sector. There were 213 residents of the municipality who were employed in some capacity, of which females made up 41.8% of the workforce.

In 2008 the total number of full-time equivalent jobs was 69. The number of jobs in the primary sector was 34, of which 31 were in agriculture and 3 were in forestry or lumber production. The number of jobs in the secondary sector was 12 of which 4 or (33.3%) were in manufacturing and 8 (66.7%) were in construction. The number of jobs in the tertiary sector was 23. In the tertiary sector; 8 or 34.8% were in wholesale or retail sales or the repair of motor vehicles, 3 or 13.0% were in the movement and storage of goods, 3 or 13.0% were in a hotel or restaurant, 1 was in the information industry, 1 was a technical professional or scientist, 3 or 13.0% were in education.

In 2000, there were 14 workers who commuted into the municipality and 141 workers who commuted away. The municipality is a net exporter of workers, with about 10.1 workers leaving the municipality for every one entering. Of the working population, 7% used public transportation to get to work, and 61% used a private car.

== Religion ==
From the 2000 census, 61 or 14.8% were Roman Catholic, while 263 or 64.0% belonged to the Swiss Reformed Church. Of the rest of the population, there were 34 individuals (or about 8.27% of the population) who belonged to another Christian church. There were 2 individuals who belonged to another church. 49 (or about 11.92% of the population) belonged to no church, are agnostic or atheist, and 16 individuals (or about 3.89% of the population) did not answer the question.

== Education ==
In Saint-Cierges about 161 or (39.2%) of the population have completed non-mandatory upper secondary education, and 41 or (10.0%) have completed additional higher education (either university or a Fachhochschule). Of the 41 who completed tertiary schooling, 65.9% were Swiss men, 24.4% were Swiss women.

In the 2009/2010 school year there were a total of 51 students in the Saint-Cierges school district. In the Vaud cantonal school system, two years of non-obligatory pre-school are provided by the political districts. During the school year, the political district provided pre-school care for a total of 296 children of which 96 children (32.4%) received subsidized pre-school care. The canton's primary school program requires students to attend for four years. There were 26 students in the municipal primary school program. The obligatory lower secondary school program lasts for six years and there were 25 students in those schools.

As of 2000, there were 40 students in Saint-Cierges who came from another municipality, while 72 residents attended schools outside the municipality.
