= Chapelle-sur-Moudon =

- Former municipality
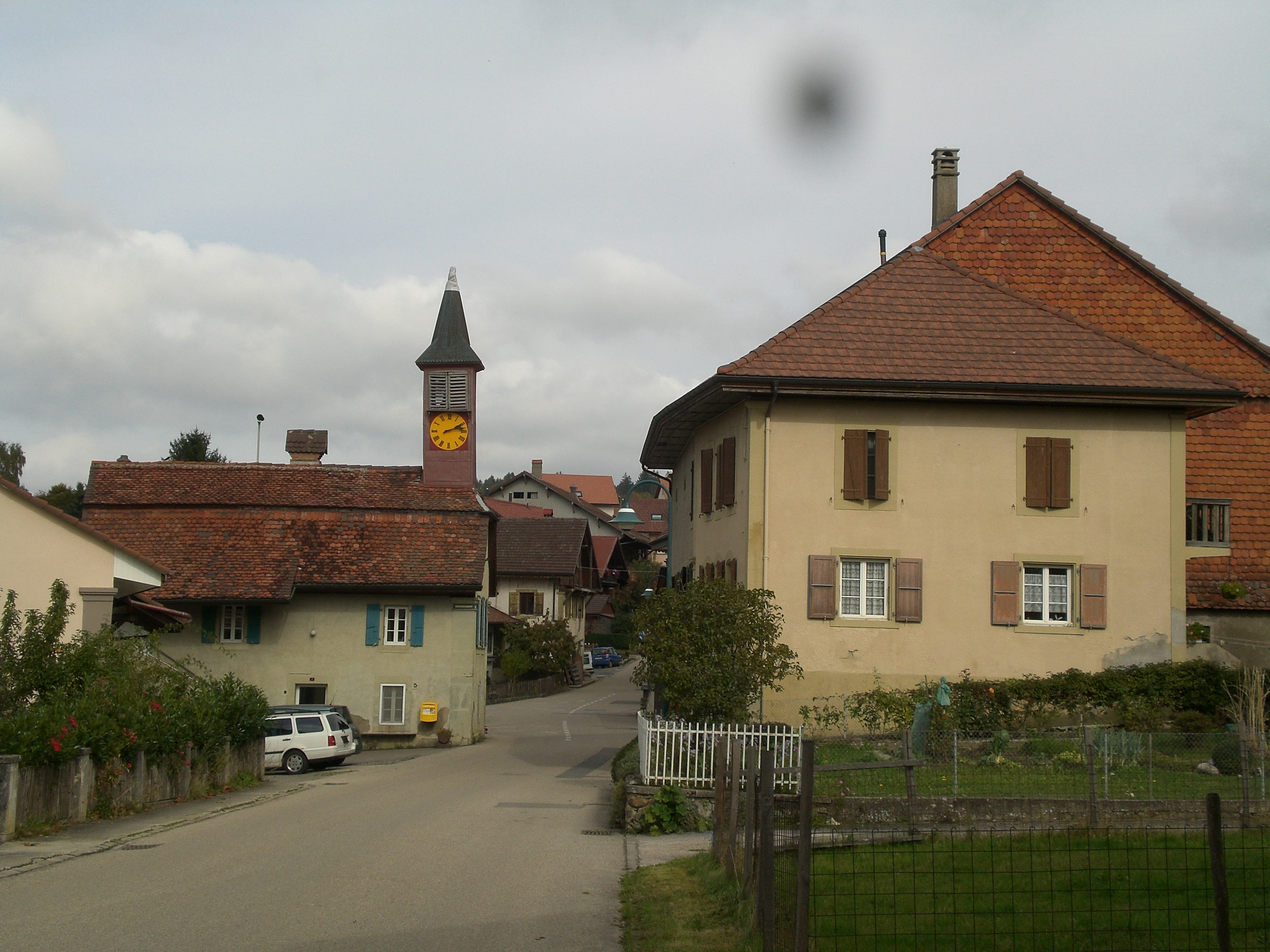

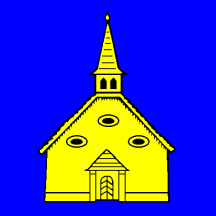
- Flag Coat of arms
- Location of Chapelle-sur-Moudon
- Location within Switzerland Location within Canton of Vaud
- Coordinates: 46°40′N 6°44′E
- Country: Switzerland
- Canton: Vaud
- District: Gros-de-Vaud

Area
  - Total: 4.63 km^{2} (1.79 sq mi)
- Elevation: 759 m (2,490 ft)

Population (2011)
  - Total: 409
  - Density: 88.3/km^{2} (229/sq mi)
- Time zone: UTC+01:00 (CET)
  - Summer (DST): UTC+02:00 (CEST)
- Postal code: 1063
- SFOS number: 5664
- ISO 3166 code: CH-VD
- Surrounded by: Boulens, Martherenges, Moudon, Peyres-Possens, Saint-Cierges, Sottens
- Website: Profile (in French), SFSO statistics

Chapelle-sur-Moudon is a former municipality in the district Gros-de-Vaud in the canton of Vaud in Switzerland. The municipalities of Chapelle-sur-Moudon, Correvon, Denezy, Martherenges, Neyruz-sur-Moudon, Peyres-Possens, Saint-Cierges, Thierrens and Chanéaz merged on 1 January 2013 into the new municipality of Montanaire.

== History ==
Chapelle-sur-Moudon is first mentioned in 1177 as Capellam. In 1228 it was mentioned as Capella Vualdana. Under Bernese administration, it was known as Chapelle Vaudanne. After the creation of the Canton of Vaud (1798) it was known as Chapelle until 1953.

== Geography ==
Chapelle-sur-Moudon had an area, as of 2009, of 4.6 square kilometers (1.8 mi^{2}). Of this area, 3.77 km^{2} (1.46 mi^{2}) or 81.4% is used for agricultural purposes, while 0.6 km^{2} (0.23 mi^{2}) or 13.0% is forested. Of the rest of the land, 0.3 km^{2} (0.12 mi^{2}) or 6.5% is settled (buildings or roads).

Of the built up area, housing and buildings made up 3.7% and transportation infrastructure made up 1.9%. Out of the forested land, all of the forested land area is covered with heavy forests. Of the agricultural land, 68.5% is used for growing crops and 12.1% is pastures.

The municipality was part of the Moudon District until it was dissolved on 31 August 2006, and Chapelle-sur-Moudon became part of the new district of Gros-de-Vaud.

The former municipality is located on the left side of the Broye valley. It consists of the village of Chapelle-sur-Moudon and the hamlet of Combe.

== Coat of arms ==
The blazon of the municipal coat of arms is Azure, a Chapel Or.

== Demographics ==
Chapelle-sur-Moudon had a population (as of 2011) of 409. As of 2008, 11.3% of the population are resident foreign nationals. Over the last 10 years (1999–2009 ) the population has changed at a rate of 22.8%. It has changed at a rate of 19.6% due to migration and at a rate of 3.2% due to births and deaths.

Most of the population (as of 2000) speaks French (300 or 94.0%), with Portuguese being second most common (9 or 2.8%) and German being third (7 or 2.2%). There is 1 person who speaks Italian.

Of the population in the municipality 92 or about 28.8% were born in Chapelle-sur-Moudon and lived there in 2000. There were 148 or 46.4% who were born in the same canton, while 42 or 13.2% were born somewhere else in Switzerland, and 33 or 10.3% were born outside of Switzerland.

In 2008 there were 4 live births to Swiss citizens and 1 birth to non-Swiss citizens, and in same time span there were 5 deaths of Swiss citizens. Ignoring immigration and emigration, the population of Swiss citizens decreased by 1 while the foreign population increased by 1. At the same time, there were 2 non-Swiss women who immigrated from another country to Switzerland. The total Swiss population change in 2008 (from all sources, including moves across municipal borders) was an increase of 7 and the non-Swiss population remained the same. This represents a population growth rate of 1.8%.

The age distribution, as of 2009, in Chapelle-sur-Moudon is; 48 children or 12.6% of the population are between 0 and 9 years old and 55 teenagers or 14.4% are between 10 and 19. Of the adult population, 38 people or 9.9% of the population are between 20 and 29 years old. 56 people or 14.7% are between 30 and 39, 65 people or 17.0% are between 40 and 49, and 52 people or 13.6% are between 50 and 59. The senior population distribution is 34 people or 8.9% of the population are between 60 and 69 years old, 18 people or 4.7% are between 70 and 79, there are 16 people or 4.2% who are between 80 and 89.

As of 2000, there were 134 people who were single and never married in the municipality. There were 162 married individuals, 17 widows or widowers and 6 individuals who are divorced.

As of 2000, there were 116 private households in the municipality, and an average of 2.7 persons per household. There were 26 households that consist of only one person and 12 households with five or more people. Out of a total of 119 households that answered this question, 21.8% were households made up of just one person and there was 1 adult who lived with their parents. Of the rest of the households, there are 36 married couples without children, 46 married couples with children There were 6 single parents with a child or children. There was 1 household that was made up of unrelated people and 3 households that were made up of some sort of institution or another collective housing.

In 2000 there were 57 single family homes (or 58.2% of the total) out of a total of 98 inhabited buildings. There were 17 multi-family buildings (17.3%), along with 17 multi-purpose buildings that were mostly used for housing (17.3%) and 7 other use buildings (commercial or industrial) that also had some housing (7.1%). Of the single family homes 27 were built before 1919, while 3 were built between 1990 and 2000. The most multi-family homes (8) were built before 1919 and the next most (4) were built between 1981 and 1990. There was 1 multi-family house built between 1996 and 2000.

In 2000 there were 128 apartments in the municipality. The most common apartment size was 4 rooms of which there were 33. There were 4 single room apartments and 64 apartments with five or more rooms. Of these apartments, a total of 110 apartments (85.9% of the total) were permanently occupied, while 14 apartments (10.9%) were seasonally occupied and 4 apartments (3.1%) were empty. As of 2009, the construction rate of new housing units was 2.6 new units per 1000 residents. The vacancy rate for the municipality, in 2010, was 1.92%.

The historical population is given in the following chart:

== Politics ==
In the 2007 federal election the most popular party was the SVP which received 32.77% of the vote. The next three most popular parties were the SP (23.09%), the FDP (20.07%) and the Green Party (10.99%). In the federal election, a total of 126 votes were cast, and the voter turnout was 49.6%.

== Economy ==
As of 2010, Chapelle-sur-Moudon had an unemployment rate of 2%. As of 2008, there were 21 people employed in the primary economic sector and about 7 businesses involved in this sector. 53 people were employed in the secondary sector and there were 5 businesses in this sector. 26 people were employed in the tertiary sector, with 12 businesses in this sector. There were 149 residents of the municipality who were employed in some capacity, of which females made up 37.6% of the workforce.

In 2008 the total number of full-time equivalent jobs was 78. The number of jobs in the primary sector was 15, all of which were in agriculture. The number of jobs in the secondary sector was 45, all of which were in construction. The number of jobs in the tertiary sector was 18. In the tertiary sector; 1 was in the sale or repair of motor vehicles, 2 or 11.1% were in the movement and storage of goods, 3 or 16.7% were in the information industry, 4 or 22.2% were technical professionals or scientists, 4 or 22.2% were in education.

In 2000, there were 17 workers who commuted into the municipality and 95 workers who commuted away. The municipality is a net exporter of workers, with about 5.6 workers leaving the municipality for every one entering. Of the working population, 7.4% used public transportation to get to work, and 57.7% used a private car.

== Religion ==
From the 2000 census, 45 or 14.1% were Roman Catholic, while 217 or 68.0% belonged to the Swiss Reformed Church. Of the rest of the population, there were 18 individuals (or about 5.64% of the population) who belonged to another Christian church. There were 3 (or about 0.94% of the population) who were Islamic. 34 (or about 10.66% of the population) belonged to no church, are agnostic or atheist, and 8 individuals (or about 2.51% of the population) did not answer the question.

== Education ==
In Chapelle-sur-Moudon about 113 or (35.4%) of the population have completed non-mandatory upper secondary education, and 40 or (12.5%) have completed additional higher education (either university or a Fachhochschule). Of the 40 who completed tertiary schooling, 72.5% were Swiss men, 20.0% were Swiss women.

In the 2009/2010 school year there were a total of 51 students in the Chapelle-sur-Moudon school district. In the Vaud cantonal school system, two years of non-obligatory pre-school are provided by the political districts. During the school year, the political district provided pre-school care for a total of 296 children of which 96 children (32.4%) received subsidized pre-school care. The canton's primary school program requires students to attend for four years. There were 29 students in the municipal primary school program. The obligatory lower secondary school program lasts for six years and there were 22 students in those schools.

As of 2000, there were 11 students in Chapelle-sur-Moudon who came from another municipality, while 47 residents attended schools outside the municipality.
