= Thierrens =

- Former municipality
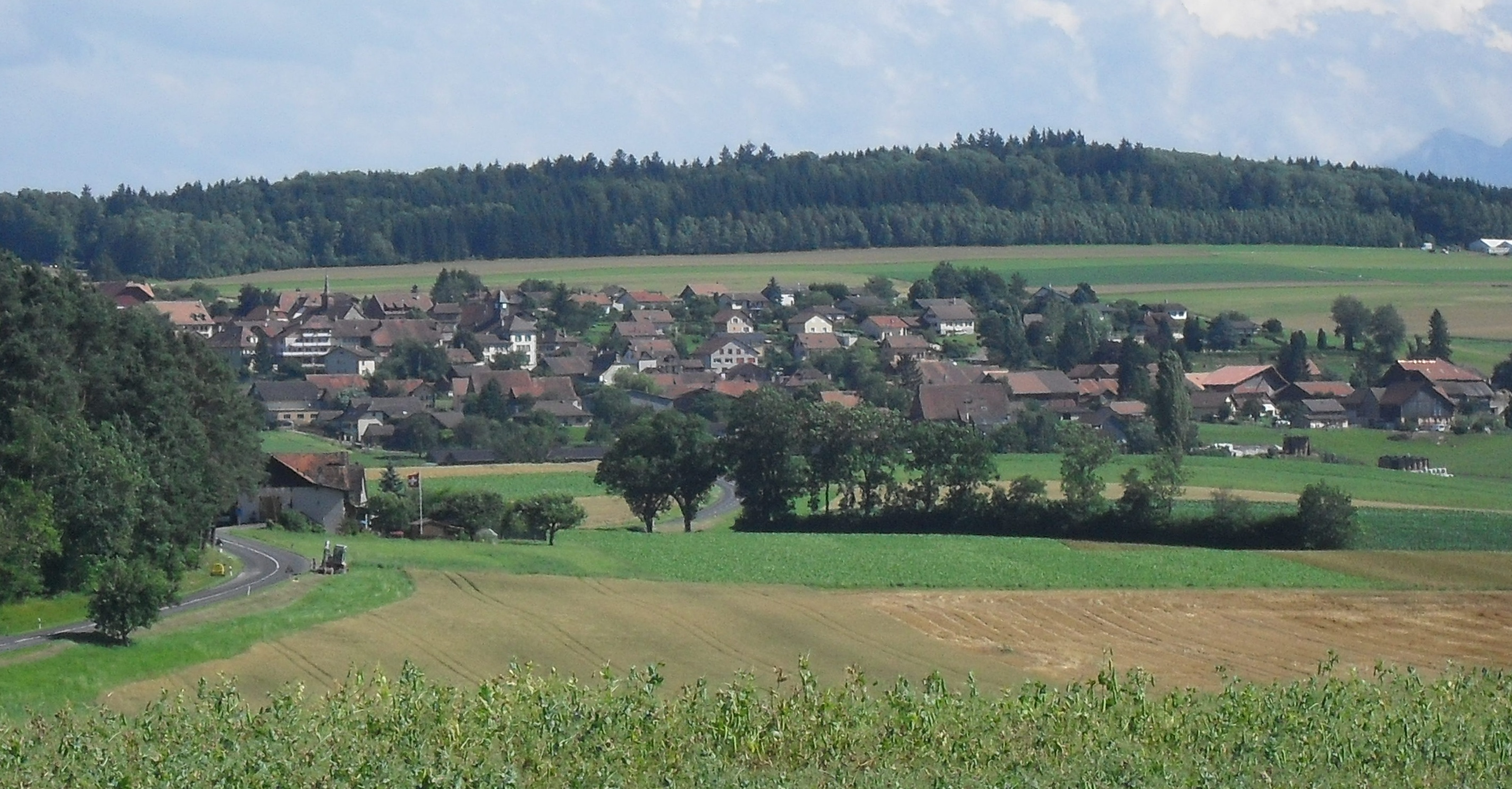

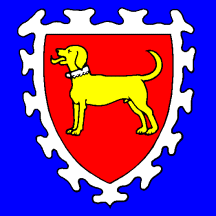
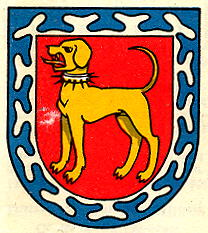
- Flag Coat of arms
- Location of Thierrens
- Location within Switzerland Location within Canton of Vaud
- Coordinates: 46°42′N 6°45′E
- Country: Switzerland
- Canton: Vaud
- District: Gros-de-Vaud

Area
  - Total: 8.72 km^{2} (3.37 sq mi)
- Elevation: 768 m (2,520 ft)

Population (2011)
  - Total: 716
  - Density: 82.1/km^{2} (213/sq mi)
- Time zone: UTC+01:00 (CET)
  - Summer (DST): UTC+02:00 (CEST)
- Postal code: 1410
- SFOS number: 5689
- ISO 3166 code: CH-VD
- Surrounded by: Vuissens (FR), Denezy, Neyruz-sur-Moudon, Saint-Cierges, Ogens, Correvon
- Website: www.thierrens.ch

Thierrens is a former municipality in the district Gros-de-Vaud in the canton of Vaud in Switzerland. The municipalities of Chapelle-sur-Moudon, Correvon, Denezy, Martherenges, Neyruz-sur-Moudon, Peyres-Possens, Saint-Cierges, Thierrens and Chanéaz merged on 1 January 2013 into the new municipality of Montanaire.

== History ==
Thierrens is first mentioned around 1004-07 as Teoderinco.

== Geography ==
Thierrens had an area, as of 2009, of 8.7 square kilometers (3.4 mi^{2}). Of this area, 6.2 km^{2} (2.4 mi^{2}) or 71.1% is used for agricultural purposes, while 1.97 km^{2} (0.76 mi^{2}) or 22.6% is forested. Of the rest of the land, 0.57 km^{2} (0.22 mi^{2}) or 6.5% is settled (buildings or roads).

Of the built up area, housing and buildings made up 2.8% and transportation infrastructure made up 2.9%. Out of the forested land, all of the forested land area is covered with heavy forests. Of the agricultural land, 62.6% is used for growing crops and 8.3% is pastures.

The former municipality was part of the Moudon District until it was dissolved on 31 August 2006, and Thierrens became part of the new district of Gros-de-Vaud.

The former municipality is located at the crossroads of the Moudon-Yverdon and Echallens-Payerne roads.

== Coat of arms ==
The blazon of the municipal coat of arms is On an escutcheon Gules a Dog Or gorged Argent, bordered Nebuly Azure and Argent.

== Demographics ==
Thierrens had a population (as of 2011) of 716. As of 2008, 12.0% of the population are resident foreign nationals. Over the last 10 years (1999–2009 ) the population has changed at a rate of 16.1%. It has changed at a rate of 9.7% due to migration and at a rate of 6.9% due to births and deaths.

Most of the population (as of 2000) speaks French (534 or 92.2%), with Portuguese being second most common (22 or 3.8%) and German being third (13 or 2.2%). There is 1 person who speaks Italian.

Of the population in the municipality 162 or about 28.0% were born in Thierrens and lived there in 2000. There were 242 or 41.8% who were born in the same canton, while 62 or 10.7% were born somewhere else in Switzerland, and 91 or 15.7% were born outside of Switzerland.

In 2008 there were 8 live births to Swiss citizens and 4 births to non-Swiss citizens, and in same time span there were 2 deaths of Swiss citizens. Ignoring immigration and emigration, the population of Swiss citizens increased by 6 while the foreign population increased by 4. At the same time, there were 2 non-Swiss men and 6 non-Swiss women who immigrated from another country to Switzerland. The total Swiss population change in 2008 (from all sources, including moves across municipal borders) was an increase of 14 and the non-Swiss population increased by 17 people. This represents a population growth rate of 5.1%.

The age distribution, as of 2009, in Thierrens is; 80 children or 11.9% of the population are between 0 and 9 years old and 97 teenagers or 14.5% are between 10 and 19. Of the adult population, 77 people or 11.5% of the population are between 20 and 29 years old. 101 people or 15.1% are between 30 and 39, 114 people or 17.0% are between 40 and 49, and 78 people or 11.6% are between 50 and 59. The senior population distribution is 67 people or 10.0% of the population are between 60 and 69 years old, 32 people or 4.8% are between 70 and 79, there are 22 people or 3.3% who are between 80 and 89, and there are 3 people or 0.4% who are 90 and older.

As of 2000, there were 253 people who were single and never married in the municipality. There were 279 married individuals, 31 widows or widowers and 16 individuals who are divorced.

As of 2000, there were 229 private households in the municipality, and an average of 2.5 persons per household. There were 69 households that consist of only one person and 22 households with five or more people. Out of a total of 241 households that answered this question, 28.6% were households made up of just one person and there was 1 adult who lived with their parents. Of the rest of the households, there are 57 married couples without children, 83 married couples with children There were 12 single parents with a child or children. There were 7 households that were made up of unrelated people and 12 households that were made up of some sort of institution or another collective housing.

In 2000 there were 89 single family homes (or 54.9% of the total) out of a total of 162 inhabited buildings. There were 20 multi-family buildings (12.3%), along with 41 multi-purpose buildings that were mostly used for housing (25.3%) and 12 other use buildings (commercial or industrial) that also had some housing (7.4%). Of the single family homes 37 were built before 1919, while 11 were built between 1990 and 2000. The most multi-family homes (12) were built before 1919 and the next most (3) were built between 1971 and 1980.

In 2000 there were 247 apartments in the municipality. The most common apartment size was 3 rooms of which there were 55. There were 15 single room apartments and 90 apartments with five or more rooms. Of these apartments, a total of 210 apartments (85.0% of the total) were permanently occupied, while 27 apartments (10.9%) were seasonally occupied and 10 apartments (4.0%) were empty. As of 2009, the construction rate of new housing units was 3 new units per 1000 residents. The vacancy rate for the municipality, in 2010, was 1.42%.

The historical population is given in the following chart:

== Politics ==
In the 2007 federal election the most popular party was the SVP which received 31.91% of the vote. The next three most popular parties were the FDP (18.9%), the SP (14.45%) and the Green Party (8.56%). In the federal election, a total of 194 votes were cast, and the voter turnout was 46.5%.

== Economy ==
As of 2010, Thierrens had an unemployment rate of 3.2%. As of 2008, there were 65 people employed in the primary economic sector and about 17 businesses involved in this sector. 18 people were employed in the secondary sector and there were 7 businesses in this sector. 138 people were employed in the tertiary sector, with 24 businesses in this sector. There were 307 residents of the municipality who were employed in some capacity, of which females made up 40.4% of the workforce.

In 2008 the total number of full-time equivalent jobs was 163. The number of jobs in the primary sector was 47, of which 45 were in agriculture and 2 were in forestry or lumber production. The number of jobs in the secondary sector was 18 of which 12 or (66.7%) were in manufacturing and 6 (33.3%) were in construction. The number of jobs in the tertiary sector was 98. In the tertiary sector; 22 or 22.4% were in wholesale or retail sales or the repair of motor vehicles, 13 or 13.3% were in the movement and storage of goods, 7 or 7.1% were in a hotel or restaurant, 10 or 10.2% were the insurance or financial industry, 5 or 5.1% were technical professionals or scientists, 26 or 26.5% were in education and 9 or 9.2% were in health care.

In 2000, there were 77 workers who commuted into the municipality and 188 workers who commuted away. The municipality is a net exporter of workers, with about 2.4 workers leaving the municipality for every one entering. Of the working population, 5.2% used public transportation to get to work, and 66.8% used a private car.

== Religion ==
From the 2000 census, 121 or 20.9% were Roman Catholic, while 336 or 58.0% belonged to the Swiss Reformed Church. Of the rest of the population, there was 1 member of an Orthodox church, and there was 1 individual who belongs to another Christian church. There was 1 individual who was Islamic. 82 (or about 14.16% of the population) belonged to no church, are agnostic or atheist, and 37 individuals (or about 6.39% of the population) did not answer the question.

== Weather ==
Thierrens has an average of 126.5 days of rain or snow per year and on average receives 1,094 mm (43.1 in) of precipitation. The wettest month is June during which time Thierrens receives an average of 111 mm (4.4 in) of rain or snow. During this month there is precipitation for an average of 11.3 days. The month with the most days of precipitation is May, with an average of 13.2, but with only 102 mm (4.0 in) of rain or snow. The driest month of the year is February with an average of 76 mm (3.0 in) of precipitation over 10.2 days.

== Education ==
In Thierrens about 227 or (39.2%) of the population have completed non-mandatory upper secondary education, and 70 or (12.1%) have completed additional higher education (either university or a Fachhochschule). Of the 70 who completed tertiary schooling, 64.3% were Swiss men, 21.4% were Swiss women and 8.6% were non-Swiss women.

In the 2009/2010 school year there were a total of 92 students in the Thierrens school district. In the Vaud cantonal school system, two years of non-obligatory pre-school are provided by the political districts. During the school year, the political district provided pre-school care for a total of 296 children of which 96 children (32.4%) received subsidized pre-school care. The canton's primary school program requires students to attend for four years. There were 48 students in the municipal primary school program. The obligatory lower secondary school program lasts for six years and there were 44 students in those schools.

As of 2000, there were 249 students in Thierrens who came from another municipality, while 38 residents attended schools outside the municipality.

== Celebrations ==
From July 16 to August 3, 2003, Thierrens hosted the canton-wide festival of the Fédération Vaudoise des Jeunesses Campagnardes (FVJC).
