= Correvon =

- Former municipality
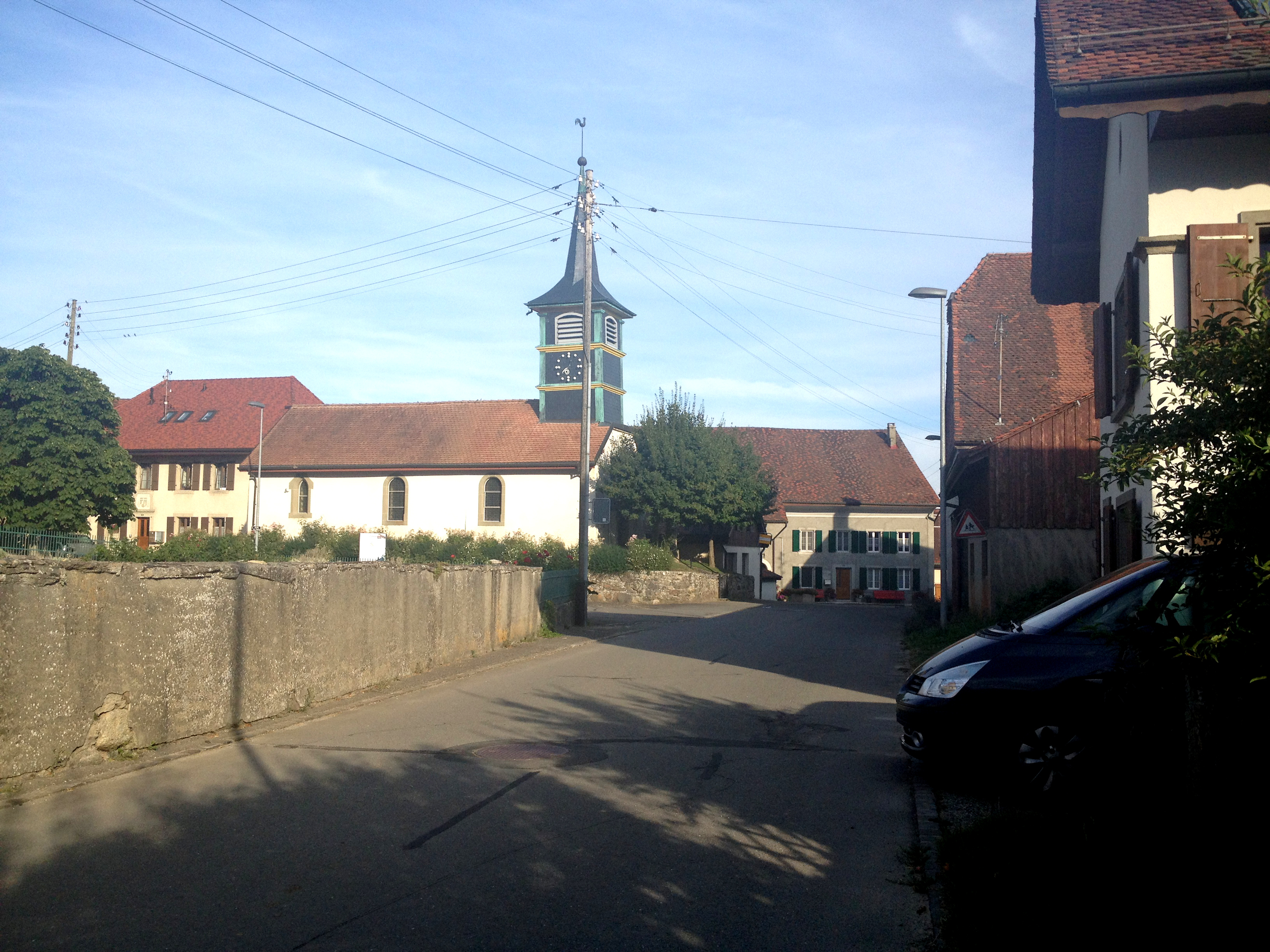

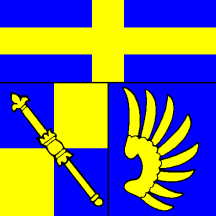
- Flag Coat of arms
- Location of Correvon
- Location within Switzerland Location within Canton of Vaud
- Coordinates: 46°43′N 6°44′E
- Country: Switzerland
- Canton: Vaud
- District: Gros-de-Vaud

Area
  - Total: 2.24 km^{2} (0.86 sq mi)
- Elevation: 752 m (2,467 ft)

Population (2011)
  - Total: 106
  - Density: 47.3/km^{2} (123/sq mi)
- Time zone: UTC+01:00 (CET)
  - Summer (DST): UTC+02:00 (CEST)
- Postal code: 1410
- SFOS number: 5667
- ISO 3166 code: CH-VD
- Surrounded by: Bioley-Magnoux, Chanéaz, Ogens, Thierrens, Vuissens (FR)
- Website: Profile (in French), SFSO statistics

Correvon is a former municipality in the district of Gros-de-Vaud in the canton of Vaud in Switzerland. The municipalities of Chapelle-sur-Moudon, Correvon, Denezy, Martherenges, Neyruz-sur-Moudon, Peyres-Possens, Saint-Cierges, Thierrens and Chanéaz merged on 1 January 2013 into the new municipality of Montanaire.

== History ==
Correvon is first mentioned in 1166 as Correuont.

== Geography ==
Correvon had an area, as of 2009, of 2.2 square kilometers (0.85 mi^{2}). Of this area, 1.86 km^{2} (0.72 mi^{2}) or 83.0% is used for agricultural purposes, while 0.28 km^{2} (0.11 mi^{2}) or 12.5% is forested. Of the rest of the land, 0.05 km^{2} (12 acres) or 2.2% is settled (buildings or roads).

Of the built up area, housing and buildings made up 1.3% and transportation infrastructure made up 0.4%. Out of the forested land, all of the forested land area is covered with heavy forests. Of the agricultural land, 68.3% is used for growing crops and 14.3% is pastures.

The former municipality was part of the Moudon District until it was dissolved on 31 August 2006, and Correvon became part of the new district of Gros-de-Vaud.

The former municipality is located on a plateau between the Broye and Mentue rivers.

== Coat of arms ==
The blazon of the municipal coat of arms is Tierced per fess base per pale, 1. Azure a cross Or; 2. Quartered Azure and Or, overall a flory Staff bendwise of the second; 3. Azure, a Wing sinister Or.

== Demographics ==
Correvon had a population (as of 2011) of 106. As of 2008, 9.2% of the population are resident foreign nationals. Over the last 10 years (1999–2009 ) the population has changed at a rate of -0.9%. It has changed at a rate of -13.1% due to migration and at a rate of 11.2% due to births and deaths. Most of the population (as of 2000) speaks French (105 or 95.5%) with the rest speaking German

Of the population in the municipality 37 or about 33.6% were born in Correvon and lived there in 2000. There were 46 or 41.8% who were born in the same canton, while 26 or 23.6% were born somewhere else in Switzerland, and 1 or 0.9% were born outside of Switzerland.

In 2008 there were no live births to Swiss citizens. Ignoring immigration and emigration, the population of Swiss citizens remained the same while the foreign population remained the same. There were 2 Swiss men and 4 Swiss women who emigrated from Switzerland. At the same time, there was 1 non-Swiss man who immigrated from another country to Switzerland. The total Swiss population remained the same in 2008 and the non-Swiss population decreased by 4 people. This represents a population growth rate of -3.9%.

The age distribution, as of 2009, in Correvon is; 15 children or 14.2% of the population are between 0 and 9 years old and 12 teenagers or 11.3% are between 10 and 19. Of the adult population, 15 people or 14.2% of the population are between 20 and 29 years old. 16 people or 15.1% are between 30 and 39, 13 people or 12.3% are between 40 and 49, and 15 people or 14.2% are between 50 and 59. The senior population distribution is 6 people or 5.7% of the population are between 60 and 69 years old, 9 people or 8.5% are between 70 and 79, there are 3 people or 2.8% who are between 80 and 89, and there are 2 people or 1.9% who are 90 and older.

As of 2000, there were 56 people who were single and never married in the municipality. There were 50 married individuals, 2 widows or widowers and 2 individuals who are divorced.

As of 2000, there were 36 private households in the municipality, and an average of 2.9 persons per household. There were 2 households that consist of only one person and 3 households with five or more people. Out of a total of 37 households that answered this question, 5.4% were households made up of just one person. Of the rest of the households, there are 13 married couples without children, 17 married couples with children There were 2 single parents with a child or children. There were 2 households that were made up of unrelated people and 1 household that was made up of some sort of institution or another collective housing.

In 2000 there were 16 single family homes (or 55.2% of the total) out of a total of 29 inhabited buildings. There were 3 multi-family buildings (10.3%) and along with 10 multi-purpose buildings that were mostly used for housing (34.5%). Of the single family homes 10 were built before 1919. The most multi-family homes (2) were built before 1919 and the next most (1) were built between 1946 and 1960.

In 2000 there were 42 apartments in the municipality. The most common apartment size was 6 rooms of which there were 11. There were 4 single room apartments and 20 apartments with five or more rooms. Of these apartments, a total of 34 apartments (81.0% of the total) were permanently occupied, while 6 apartments (14.3%) were seasonally occupied and 2 apartments (4.8%) were empty. As of 2009, the construction rate of new housing units was 0 new units per 1000 residents. The vacancy rate for the municipality, in 2010, was 6.98%.

The historical population is given in the following chart:

== Politics ==
In the 2007 federal election the most popular party was the SVP which received 42.94% of the vote. The next three most popular parties were the FDP (29.38%), the Green Party (8.1%) and the LPS Party (4.33%). In the federal election, a total of 30 votes were cast, and the voter turnout was 93.8%.

== Economy ==
As of 2010, Correvon had an unemployment rate of 2.4%. As of 2008, there were 15 people employed in the primary economic sector and about 5 businesses involved in this sector. 1 person was employed in the secondary sector and there was 1 business in this sector. No one was employed in the tertiary sector. There were 59 residents of the municipality who were employed in some capacity, of which females made up 39.0% of the workforce.

In 2008 the total number of full-time equivalent jobs was 10. The number of jobs in the primary sector was 9, all of which were in agriculture. The number of jobs in the secondary sector was 1, in manufacturing. In 2000, there were 43 workers who commuted away from the municipality. Of the working population, 3.4% used public transportation to get to work, and 74.6% used a private car.

== Religion ==
From the 2000 census, 23 or 20.9% were Roman Catholic, while 81 or 73.6% belonged to the Swiss Reformed Church. 4 (or about 3.64% of the population) belonged to no church, are agnostic or atheist, and 2 individuals (or about 1.82% of the population) did not answer the question.

== Education ==
In Correvon about 48 or (43.6%) of the population have completed non-mandatory upper secondary education, and 11 or (10.0%) have completed additional higher education (either university or a Fachhochschule). Of the 11 who completed tertiary schooling, 54.5% were Swiss men, 27.3% were Swiss women.

In the 2009/2010 school year there were a total of 15 students in the Correvon school district. In the Vaud cantonal school system, two years of non-obligatory pre-school are provided by the political districts. During the school year, the political district provided pre-school care for a total of 296 children of which 96 children (32.4%) received subsidized pre-school care. The canton's primary school program requires students to attend for four years. There were 10 students in the municipal primary school program. The obligatory lower secondary school program lasts for six years and there were 5 students in those schools.

As of 2000, there were 22 students from Correvon who attended schools outside the municipality.
