= Martherenges =

- Former municipality
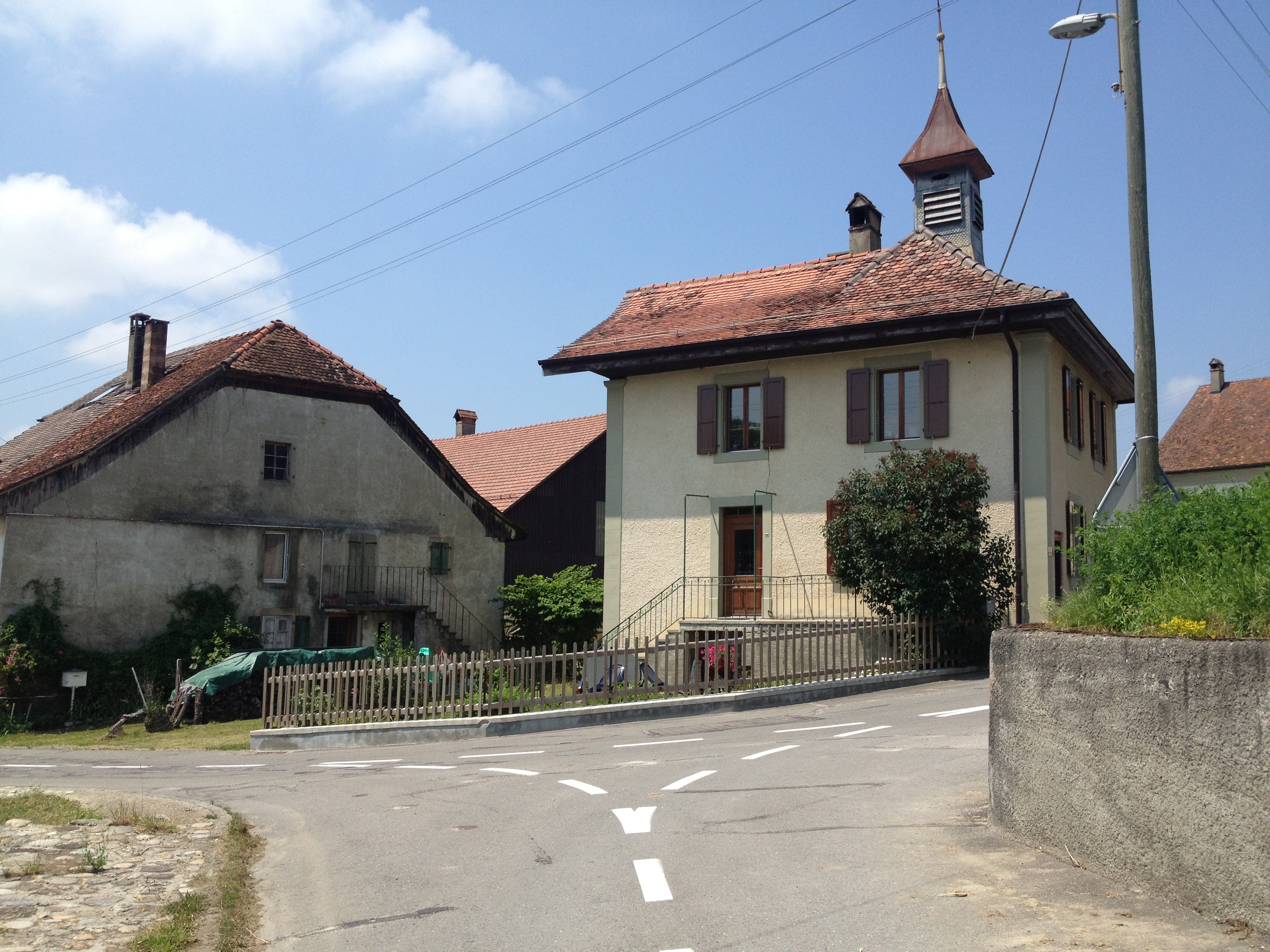

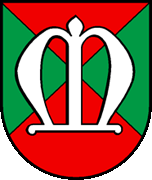
- Flag Coat of arms
- Location of Martherenges
- Location within Switzerland Location within Canton of Vaud
- Coordinates: 46°40′N 6°45′E
- Country: Switzerland
- Canton: Vaud
- District: Gros-de-Vaud

Area
  - Total: 0.83 km^{2} (0.32 sq mi)
- Elevation: 767 m (2,516 ft)

Population (2011)
  - Total: 77
  - Density: 93/km^{2} (240/sq mi)
- Time zone: UTC+01:00 (CET)
  - Summer (DST): UTC+02:00 (CEST)
- Postal code: 1063
- SFOS number: 5676
- ISO 3166 code: CH-VD
- Surrounded by: Chapelle-sur-Moudon, Moudon, Sottens
- Website: Profile (in French), SFSO statistics

Martherenges (French pronunciation: [maʁtəʁɑ̃ʒ]) is a former municipality in the district Gros-de-Vaud in the canton of Vaud in Switzerland. The municipalities of Chapelle-sur-Moudon, Correvon, Denezy, Martherenges, Neyruz-sur-Moudon, Peyres-Possens, Saint-Cierges, Thierrens and Chanéaz merged on 1 January 2013 into the new municipality of Montanaire.

== History ==
Martherenges is first mentioned in the 15th Century as Martherenges.

== Geography ==
Martherenges had an area, as of 2009, of 0.8 square kilometers (0.31 mi^{2}). Of this area, 0.5 km^{2} (0.19 mi^{2}) or 60.2% is used for agricultural purposes, while 0.29 km^{2} (0.11 mi^{2}) or 34.9% is forested. Of the rest of the land, 0.04 km^{2} (9.9 acres) or 4.8% is settled (buildings or roads).

Of the built up area, housing and buildings made up 3.6% and transportation infrastructure made up 0.0%. while parks, green belts and sports fields made up 1.2%. Out of the forested land, all of the forested land area is covered with heavy forests. Of the agricultural land, 28.9% is used for growing crops and 28.9% is pastures, while 2.4% is used for orchards or vine crops.

The former municipality was part of the Moudon District until it was dissolved on 31 August 2006, and Martherenges became part of the new district of Gros-de-Vaud.

The small former municipality is located on a hill on the left side of the Broye valley.

== Coat of arms ==
The blazon of the municipal coat of arms is Per Saltire Gules and Vert, overall capital letter M Argent.

== Demographics ==
Martherenges had a population (as of 2011) of 77. As of 2008, 4.2% of the population are resident foreign nationals. Over the last 10 years (1999–2009 ) the population has changed at a rate of 13.6%. It has changed at a rate of 1.5% due to migration and at a rate of 12.1% due to births and deaths.

Most of the population (as of 2000) speaks French (65 or 91.5%), with German being second most common (4 or 5.6%) and Dutch being third (1 or 1.4%).

Of the population in the municipality 32 or about 45.1% were born in Martherenges and lived there in 2000. There were 24 or 33.8% who were born in the same canton, while 10 or 14.1% were born somewhere else in Switzerland, and 5 or 7.0% were born outside of Switzerland.

In 2008 there were 2 live births to Swiss citizens. Ignoring immigration and emigration, the population of Swiss citizens increased by 2 while the foreign population remained the same. There was 1 Swiss man who emigrated from Switzerland. The total Swiss population remained the same in 2008 and the non-Swiss population increased by 1 people. This represents a population growth rate of 1.4%.

The age distribution, as of 2009, in Martherenges is; 10 children or 13.3% of the population are between 0 and 9 years old and 8 teenagers or 10.7% are between 10 and 19. Of the adult population, 11 people or 14.7% of the population are between 20 and 29 years old. 12 people or 16.0% are between 30 and 39, 10 people or 13.3% are between 40 and 49, and 6 people or 8.0% are between 50 and 59. The senior population distribution is 10 people or 13.3% of the population are between 60 and 69 years old, 7 people or 9.3% are between 70 and 79, there is 1 person who is 80 and 89.

As of 2000, there were 32 people who were single and never married in the municipality. There were 37 married individuals, 1 widow or widower and 1 individual who was divorced.

As of 2000, there were 22 private households in the municipality, and an average of 3.2 persons per household. There were 3 households that consist of only one person and 5 households with five or more people. Out of a total of 22 households that answered this question, 13.6% were households made up of just one person. Of the rest of the households, there are 6 married couples without children, 12 married couples with children There was one single parent with a child or children.

In 2000 there were 12 single family homes (or 57.1% of the total) out of a total of 21 inhabited buildings. There were 3 multi-family buildings (14.3%) and along with 6 multi-purpose buildings that were mostly used for housing (28.6%). Of the single family homes 4 were built before 1919, while 4 were built between 1990 and 2000. The most multi-family homes (3) were built before 1919.

In 2000 there were 24 apartments in the municipality. The most common apartment size was 6 rooms of which there were 8. There were no single room apartments and 17 apartments with five or more rooms. Of these apartments, a total of 21 apartments (87.5% of the total) were permanently occupied, while 3 apartments (12.5%) were seasonally occupied. As of 2009, the construction rate of new housing units was 13.3 new units per 1000 residents. The vacancy rate for the municipality, in 2010, was 0%.

The historical population is given in the following chart:

== Politics ==
In the 2007 federal election the most popular party was the SVP which received 33.28% of the vote. The next three most popular parties were the FDP (18.76%), the SP (11.35%) and the Green Party (9.98%). In the federal election, a total of 39 votes were cast, and the voter turnout was 72.2%.

== Economy ==
As of 2010, Martherenges had an unemployment rate of 0%. As of 2008, there were 12 people employed in the primary economic sector and about 5 businesses involved in this sector. No one was employed in the secondary sector or the tertiary sector. There were 36 residents of the municipality who were employed in some capacity, of which females made up 38.9% of the workforce.

In 2008 the total number of full-time equivalent jobs was 10, all of which were in agriculture.

In 2000, there were 22 workers who commuted away from the municipality. Of the working population, 5.6% used public transportation to get to work, and 61.1% used a private car.

== Religion ==
From the 2000 census, 4 or 5.6% were Roman Catholic, while 46 or 64.8% belonged to the Swiss Reformed Church. Of the rest of the population, there were 18 individuals (or about 25.35% of the population) who belonged to another Christian church. 12 (or about 16.90% of the population) belonged to no church, are agnostic or atheist.

== Education ==
In Martherenges about 27 or (38.0%) of the population have completed non-mandatory upper secondary education, and 8 or (11.3%) have completed additional higher education (either university or a Fachhochschule). Of the 8 who completed tertiary schooling, 62.5% were Swiss men, 37.5% were Swiss women.

In the 2009/2010 school year there were a total of 8 students in the Martherenges school district. In the Vaud cantonal school system, two years of non-obligatory pre-school are provided by the political districts. During the school year, the political district provided pre-school care for a total of 296 children of which 96 children (32.4%) received subsidized pre-school care. The canton's primary school program requires students to attend for four years. There were 4 students in the municipal primary school program. The obligatory lower secondary school program lasts for six years and there were 4 students in those schools.

As of 2000, there were 16 students from Martherenges who attended schools outside the municipality.
