= Chanéaz =

- Former municipality
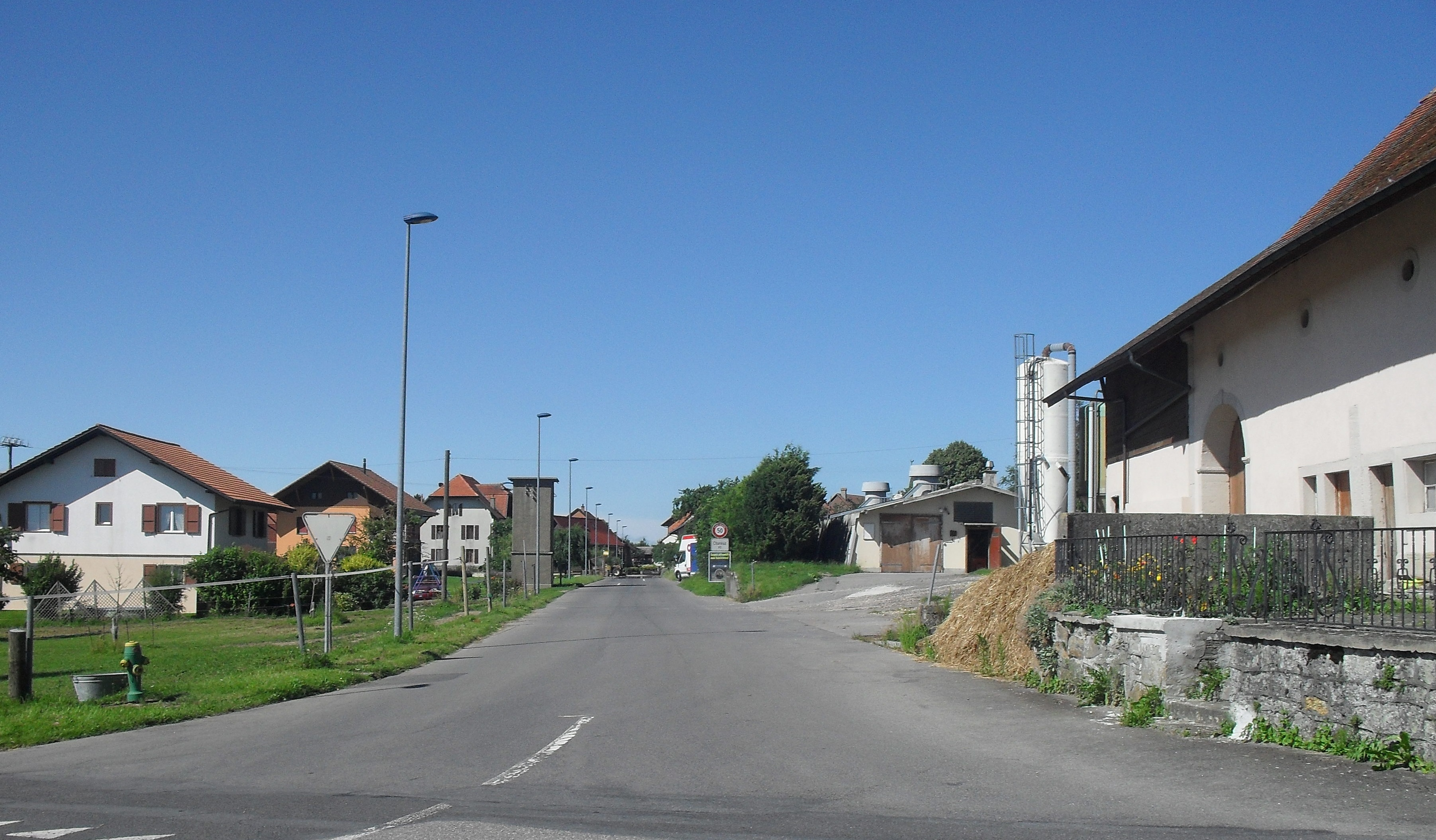

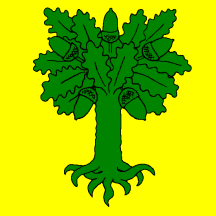
- Flag Coat of arms
- Location of Chanéaz
- Location within Switzerland Location within Canton of Vaud
- Coordinates: 46°44′N 6°45′E
- Country: Switzerland
- Canton: Vaud
- District: Jura-Nord Vaudois

Area
  - Total: 1.39 km^{2} (0.54 sq mi)
- Elevation: 755 m (2,477 ft)

Population (2011)
  - Total: 114
  - Density: 82.0/km^{2} (212/sq mi)
- Time zone: UTC+01:00 (CET)
  - Summer (DST): UTC+02:00 (CEST)
- Postal code: 1409
- SFOS number: 5906
- ISO 3166 code: CH-VD
- Surrounded by: Bioley-Magnoux, Correvon, Démoret, Prahins, Thierrens, Vuissens (FR)
- Website: Profile (in French), SFSO statistics

Chanéaz is a former municipality in the district of Jura-Nord Vaudois of the canton of Vaud in Switzerland. The municipalities of Chapelle-sur-Moudon, Correvon, Denezy, Martherenges, Neyruz-sur-Moudon, Peyres-Possens, Saint-Cierges, Thierrens and Chanéaz merged on 1 January 2013 into the new municipality of Montanaire.

== History ==
Chanéaz is first mentioned in 1184 as Chafneya.

== Geography ==
Chanéaz had an area, as of 2009, of 1.4 square kilometers (0.54 mi^{2}). Of this area, 1.01 km^{2} (0.39 mi^{2}) or 72.7% is used for agricultural purposes, while 0.36 km^{2} (0.14 mi^{2}) or 25.9% is forested. Of the rest of the land, 0.04 km^{2} (9.9 acres) or 2.9% is settled (buildings or roads).

Of the built up area, housing and buildings made up 0.7% and transportation infrastructure made up 1.4%. Out of the forested land, all of the forested land area is covered with heavy forests. Of the agricultural land, 57.6% is used for growing crops and 15.1% is pastures.

The former municipality was part of the Yverdon District until it was dissolved on 31 August 2006, and Chanéaz became part of the new district of Jura-Nord Vaudois.

The former municipality is located in the northern Jorat plateau with a small enclave between Correvon and Vuissens.

== Coat of arms ==
The blazon of the municipal coat of arms is Or, an Oak Tree eradicated Vert fructed with five Acorns of the same.

== Demographics ==
Chanéaz had a population (as of 2011) of 114. As of 2008, 4.8% of the population are resident foreign nationals. Over the last 10 years (1999–2009) the population has changed at a rate of 15.2%. It has changed at a rate of 7.6% due to migration and at a rate of 8.7% due to births and deaths.

Most of the population (as of 2000) speaks French (84 or 96.6%) as their first language with the rest speaking German

The age distribution, as of 2009, in Chanéaz is; 15 children or 14.2% of the population are between 0 and 9 years old and 14 teenagers or 13.2% are between 10 and 19. Of the adult population, 13 people or 12.3% of the population are between 20 and 29 years old. 19 people or 17.9% are between 30 and 39, 15 people or 14.2% are between 40 and 49, and 12 people or 11.3% are between 50 and 59. The senior population distribution is 7 people or 6.6% of the population are between 60 and 69 years old, 9 people or 8.5% are between 70 and 79, there are 2 people or 1.9% who are between 80 and 89.

As of 2000, there were 35 people who were single and never married in the municipality. There were 49 married individuals, 2 widows or widowers and 1 individuals who are divorced.

As of 2000, there were 33 private households in the municipality, and an average of 2.6 persons per household. There were 7 households that consist of only one person and 2 households with five or more people. Out of a total of 34 households that answered this question, 20.6% were households made up of just one person. Of the rest of the households, there are 12 married couples without children, 14 married couples with children

In 2000 there were 22 single family homes (or 73.3% of the total) out of a total of 30 inhabited buildings. There were 1 multi-family buildings (3.3%) and along with 7 multi-purpose buildings that were mostly used for housing (23.3%).

In 2000, a total of 33 apartments (94.3% of the total) were permanently occupied, while 2 apartments (5.7%) were seasonally occupied. As of 2009, the construction rate of new housing units was 0 new units per 1000 residents. The vacancy rate for the municipality, in 2010, was 2.63%.

The historical population is given in the following chart:

== Politics ==
In the 2007 federal election the most popular party was the FDP which received 34.1% of the vote. The next three most popular parties were the SP (14.49%), the SVP (14.23%) and the Green Party (12.31%). In the federal election, a total of 45 votes were cast, and the voter turnout was 59.2%.

== Economy ==
As of 2010, Chanéaz had an unemployment rate of 0.4%. As of 2008, there were 10 people employed in the primary economic sector and about 4 businesses involved in this sector. 17 people were employed in the secondary sector and there were 2 businesses in this sector. 1 person was employed in the tertiary sector, with 1 business in this sector. There were 43 residents of the municipality who were employed in some capacity, of which females made up 44.2% of the workforce.

In 2008 the total number of full-time equivalent jobs was 22. The number of jobs in the primary sector was 5, all of which were in agriculture. The number of jobs in the secondary sector was 16 of which 7 or (43.8%) were in manufacturing and 9 (56.3%) were in construction. The number of jobs in the tertiary sector was 1.

In 2000, there were 11 workers who commuted into the municipality and 31 workers who commuted away. The municipality is a net exporter of workers, with about 2.8 workers leaving the municipality for every one entering. Of the working population, 4.7% used public transportation to get to work, and 67.4% used a private car.

== Religion ==
From the 2000 census, 12 or 13.8% were Roman Catholic, while 61 or 70.1% belonged to the Swiss Reformed Church. Of the rest of the population, there was 1 individual who belongs to another Christian church. There were 2 (or about 2.30% of the population) who were Islamic. 10 (or about 11.49% of the population) belonged to no church, are agnostic or atheist, and 1 individual (or about 1.15% of the population) did not answer the question.

== Weather ==
Chanéaz has an average of 122.6 days of rain or snow per year and on average receives 977 mm (38.5 in) of precipitation. The wettest month is June during which time Chanéaz receives an average of 100 mm (3.9 in) of rain or snow. During this month there is precipitation for an average of 11 days. The month with the most days of precipitation is May, with an average of 12.7, but with only 93 mm (3.7 in) of rain or snow. The driest month of the year is February with an average of 68 mm (2.7 in) of precipitation over 10 days.

== Education ==
In Chanéaz about 36 or (41.4%) of the population have completed non-mandatory upper secondary education, and 11 or (12.6%) have completed additional higher education (either university or a Fachhochschule). Of the 11 who completed tertiary schooling, 72.7% were Swiss men, 27.3% were Swiss women.

In the 2009/2010 school year there were a total of 18 students in the Chanéaz school district. In the Vaud cantonal school system, two years of non-obligatory pre-school are provided by the political districts. During the school year, the political district provided pre-school care for a total of 578 children of which 359 children (62.1%) received subsidized pre-school care. The canton's primary school program requires students to attend for four years. There were 9 students in the municipal primary school program. The obligatory lower secondary school program lasts for six years and there were 9 students in those schools.

As of 2000, there were 15 students from Chanéaz who attended schools outside the municipality.
