= Peyres-Possens =

- Former municipality
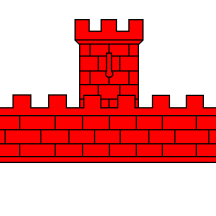
- Flag Coat of arms
- Location of Peyres-Possens
- Location within Switzerland Location within Canton of Vaud
- Coordinates: 46°40′N 6°42′E
- Country: Switzerland
- Canton: Vaud
- District: Gros-de-Vaud

Area
  - Total: 1.91 km^{2} (0.74 sq mi)
- Elevation: 703 m (2,306 ft)

Population (2011)
  - Total: 159
  - Density: 83.2/km^{2} (216/sq mi)
- Time zone: UTC+01:00 (CET)
  - Summer (DST): UTC+02:00 (CEST)
- Postal code: 1063
- SFOS number: 5682
- ISO 3166 code: CH-VD
- Surrounded by: Boulens, Chapelle-sur-Moudon, Dommartin, Fey, Montaubion-Chardonney, Naz, Sottens
- Website: Profile (in French), SFSO statistics

Peyres-Possens is a former municipality in the district of Gros-de-Vaud in the canton of Vaud in Switzerland. The municipalities of Chapelle-sur-Moudon, Correvon, Denezy, Martherenges, Neyruz-sur-Moudon, Peyres-Possens, Saint-Cierges, Thierrens and Chanéaz merged on 1 January 2013 into the new municipality of Montanaire.

== History ==
Peyres is first mentioned in 1200 as Pairi. Possens was mentioned in 1230 as Pussens.

== Geography ==
Peyres-Possens had an area, as of 2009, of 1.9 square kilometers (0.73 mi^{2}). Of this area, 0.94 km^{2} (0.36 mi^{2}) or 49.0% is used for agricultural purposes, while 0.76 km^{2} (0.29 mi^{2}) or 39.6% is forested. Of the rest of the land, 0.19 km^{2} (0.073 mi^{2}) or 9.9% is settled (buildings or roads), 0.01 km^{2} (2.5 acres) or 0.5% is either rivers or lakes.

Of the built up area, industrial buildings made up 2.6% of the total area while housing and buildings made up 1.6% and transportation infrastructure made up 1.6%. Power and water infrastructure as well as other special developed areas made up 4.2% of the area Out of the forested land, all of the forested land area is covered with heavy forests. Of the agricultural land, 35.4% is used for growing crops and 12.5% is pastures. All the water in the municipality is flowing water.

The former municipality was part of the Moudon District until it was dissolved on 31 August 2006, and Peyres-Possens became part of the new district of Gros-de-Vaud.

The former municipality is located on a hilly plateau in the mid-Jorat to the right of the Mentue river. It consists of the villages of Peyres and Possens.

== Coat of arms ==
The blazon of the municipal coat of arms is Argent, a Wall embattled and towered Gules masoned Sable.

== Demographics ==
Peyres-Possens had a population (as of 2011) of 159. As of 2008, 11.6% of the population are resident foreign nationals. Over the last 10 years (1999–2009 ) the population has changed at a rate of 31%. It has changed at a rate of 17.2% due to migration and at a rate of 12.9% due to births and deaths.

Most of the population (as of 2000) speaks French (128 or 89.5%), with German being second most common (7 or 4.9%) and Albanian being third (6 or 4.2%). There are 2 people who speak Italian.

Of the population in the municipality 37 or about 25.9% were born in Peyres-Possens and lived there in 2000. There were 58 or 40.6% who were born in the same canton, while 24 or 16.8% were born somewhere else in Switzerland, and 16 or 11.2% were born outside of Switzerland.

In 2008 there were 2 live births to Swiss citizens and 1 death of a Swiss citizen. Ignoring immigration and emigration, the population of Swiss citizens increased by 1 while the foreign population remained the same. The total Swiss population change in 2008 (from all sources, including moves across municipal borders) was an increase of 5 and the non-Swiss population remained the same. This represents a population growth rate of 3.3%.

The age distribution, as of 2009, in Peyres-Possens is; 25 children or 16.4% of the population are between 0 and 9 years old and 26 teenagers or 17.1% are between 10 and 19. Of the adult population, 8 people or 5.3% of the population are between 20 and 29 years old. 21 people or 13.8% are between 30 and 39, 29 people or 19.1% are between 40 and 49, and 11 people or 7.2% are between 50 and 59. The senior population distribution is 13 people or 8.6% of the population are between 60 and 69 years old, 16 people or 10.5% are between 70 and 79, there are 3 people or 2.0% who are between 80 and 89.

As of 2000, there were 63 people who were single and never married in the municipality. There were 57 married individuals, 10 widows or widowers and 13 individuals who are divorced.

As of 2000, there were 46 private households in the municipality, and an average of 2.5 persons per household. There were 14 households that consist of only one person and 5 households with five or more people. Out of a total of 48 households that answered this question, 29.2% were households made up of just one person. Of the rest of the households, there are 13 married couples without children, 17 married couples with children There were 2 single parents with a child or children.

In 2000 there were 12 single family homes (or 36.4% of the total) out of a total of 33 inhabited buildings. There were 4 multi-family buildings (12.1%), along with 15 multi-purpose buildings that were mostly used for housing (45.5%) and 2 other use buildings (commercial or industrial) that also had some housing (6.1%). Of the single family homes 4 were built before 1919, while 3 were built between 1990 and 2000. The greatest number of multi-family homes (2) were built between 1961 and 1970 and again between 1971 and 1980

In 2000 there were 51 apartments in the municipality. The most common apartment size was 4 rooms of which there were 17. There were 1 single room apartments and 15 apartments with five or more rooms. Of these apartments, a total of 42 apartments (82.4% of the total) were permanently occupied, while 5 apartments (9.8%) were seasonally occupied and 4 apartments (7.8%) were empty. As of 2009, the construction rate of new housing units was 0 new units per 1000 residents. The vacancy rate for the municipality, in 2010, was 3.64%.

The historical population is given in the following chart:

== Politics ==
In the 2007 federal election the most popular party was the SVP which received 37.57% of the vote. The next three most popular parties were the SP (21.96%), the FDP (16.14%) and the Green Party (6.61%). In the federal election, a total of 42 votes were cast, and the voter turnout was 44.7%.

== Economy ==
As of 2010, Peyres-Possens had an unemployment rate of 7.1%. As of 2008, there were 13 people employed in the primary economic sector and about 6 businesses involved in this sector. 20 people were employed in the secondary sector and there were 3 businesses in this sector. 2 people were employed in the tertiary sector, with 1 business in this sector. There were 54 residents of the municipality who were employed in some capacity, of which females made up 42.6% of the workforce.

In 2008 the total number of full-time equivalent jobs was 28. The number of jobs in the primary sector was 7, all of which were in agriculture. The number of jobs in the secondary sector was 19 of which 16 or (84.2%) were in manufacturing and 3 (15.8%) were in construction. The number of jobs in the tertiary sector was 2. In the tertiary sector; 2 or 100.0% were in a hotel or restaurant, .

In 2000, there were 46 workers who commuted into the municipality and 37 workers who commuted away. The municipality is a net importer of workers, with about 1.2 workers entering the municipality for every one leaving. Of the working population, 7.4% used public transportation to get to work, and 64.8% used a private car.

== Religion ==
From the 2000 census, 31 or 21.7% were Roman Catholic, while 75 or 52.4% belonged to the Swiss Reformed Church. Of the rest of the population, there were 26 individuals (or about 18.18% of the population) who belonged to another Christian church. There were 7 (or about 4.90% of the population) who were Islamic. 13 (or about 9.09% of the population) belonged to no church, are agnostic or atheist, and 4 individuals (or about 2.80% of the population) did not answer the question.

== Education ==
In Peyres-Possens about 40 or (28.0%) of the population have completed non-mandatory upper secondary education, and 20 or (14.0%) have completed additional higher education (either university or a Fachhochschule). Of the 20 who completed tertiary schooling, 55.0% were Swiss men, 35.0% were Swiss women.

In the 2009/2010 school year there were a total of 39 students in the Peyres-Possens school district. In the Vaud cantonal school system, two years of non-obligatory pre-school are provided by the political districts. During the school year, the political district provided pre-school care for a total of 296 children of which 96 children (32.4%) received subsidized pre-school care. The canton's primary school program requires students to attend for four years. There were 20 students in the municipal primary school program. The obligatory lower secondary school program lasts for six years and there were 19 students in those schools.

As of 2000, there were 20 students from Peyres-Possens who attended schools outside the municipality.
