= Moudon District =

Coordinates: 46°40′N 6°48′E

Moudon was a district in the canton of Vaud, Switzerland. The seat of the district was the town of Moudon.

The district consisted of 32 municipalities and had an area of 119.61 km^{2} with a population of 12273 inhabitants (End of 2003).

== Mergers and name changes ==
- On 1 January 1961 the municipality of Bercher went to the Echallens District.
- On 1 September 2006 the municipalities of Boulens, Chapelle-sur-Moudon, Correvon, Denezy, Martherenges, Montaubion-Chardonney, Neyruz-sur-Moudon, Ogens, Peyres-Possens, Saint-Cierges, Sottens, Thierrens, and Villars-Mendraz came from the District de Moudon to join the Gros-de-Vaud District.
- On 1 September 2006 the municipalities of Brenles, Bussy-sur-Moudon, Chavannes-sur-Moudon, Chesalles-sur-Moudon, Cremin, Curtilles, Dompierre, Forel-sur-Lucens, Hermenches, Lovatens, Lucens, Moudon, Oulens-sur-Lucens, Prévonloup, Rossenge, Sarzens, Syens, Villars-le-Comte, and Vucherens came from the District de Moudon to join the Broye-Vully District.

== Municipalities ==
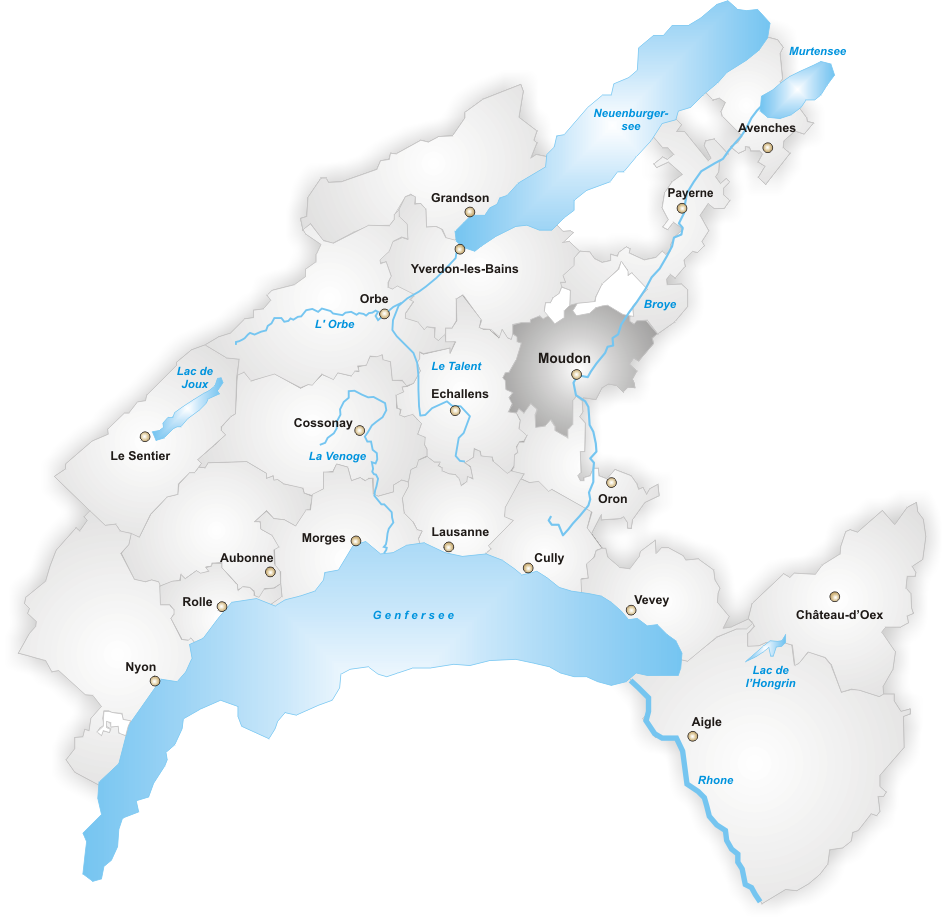
District of Moudon

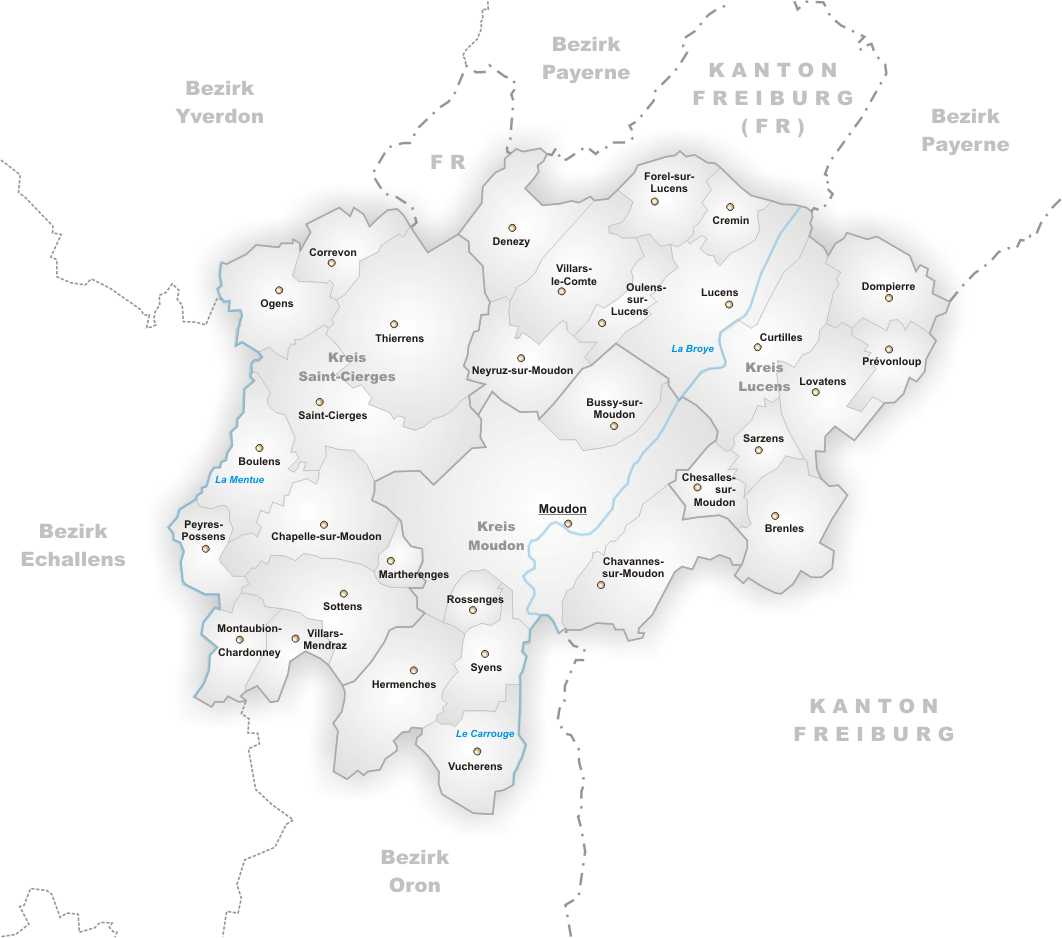
Municipalities of the district of Moudon

Cercle de Lucens
Municipality	Inhabitants (2003-12-31)	Area in km^{2}
Brenles	165	3.85
Chesalles-sur-Moudon	161	1.65
Cremin	54	1.63
Curtilles	282	4.94
Denezy	128	3.79
Dompierre	250	3.22
Forel-sur-Lucens	144	2.84
Lovatens	149	3.45
Lucens	2157	6.27
Neyruz-sur-Moudon	135	3.52
Oulens-sur-Lucens	51	1.59
Prévonloup	122	1.84
Sarzens	58	1.45
Villars-le-Comte	129	4.22

Cercle de Moudon
Municipality	Inhabitants (2003-12-31)	Area in km^{2}
Bussy-sur-Moudon	191	3.09
Chavannes-sur-Moudon	205	5.15
Hermenches	291	4.76
Moudon	4308	15.68
Rossenges	60	1.08
Syens	141	2.53
Vucherens	469	3.26

Cercle de Saint-Cierges
Municipality	Inhabitants (2003-12-31)	Area in km^{2}
Boulens	229	3.45
Chapelle-sur-Moudon	340	4.63
Correvon	98	2.24
Martherenges	66	0.83
Montaubion-Chardonney	75	2.09
Ogens	256	3.41
Peyres-Possens	128	1.91
Saint-Cierges	435	6.44
Sottens	220	4.53
Thierrens	593	8.72
Villars-Mendraz	183	1.55
