= Denezy =

- Former municipality
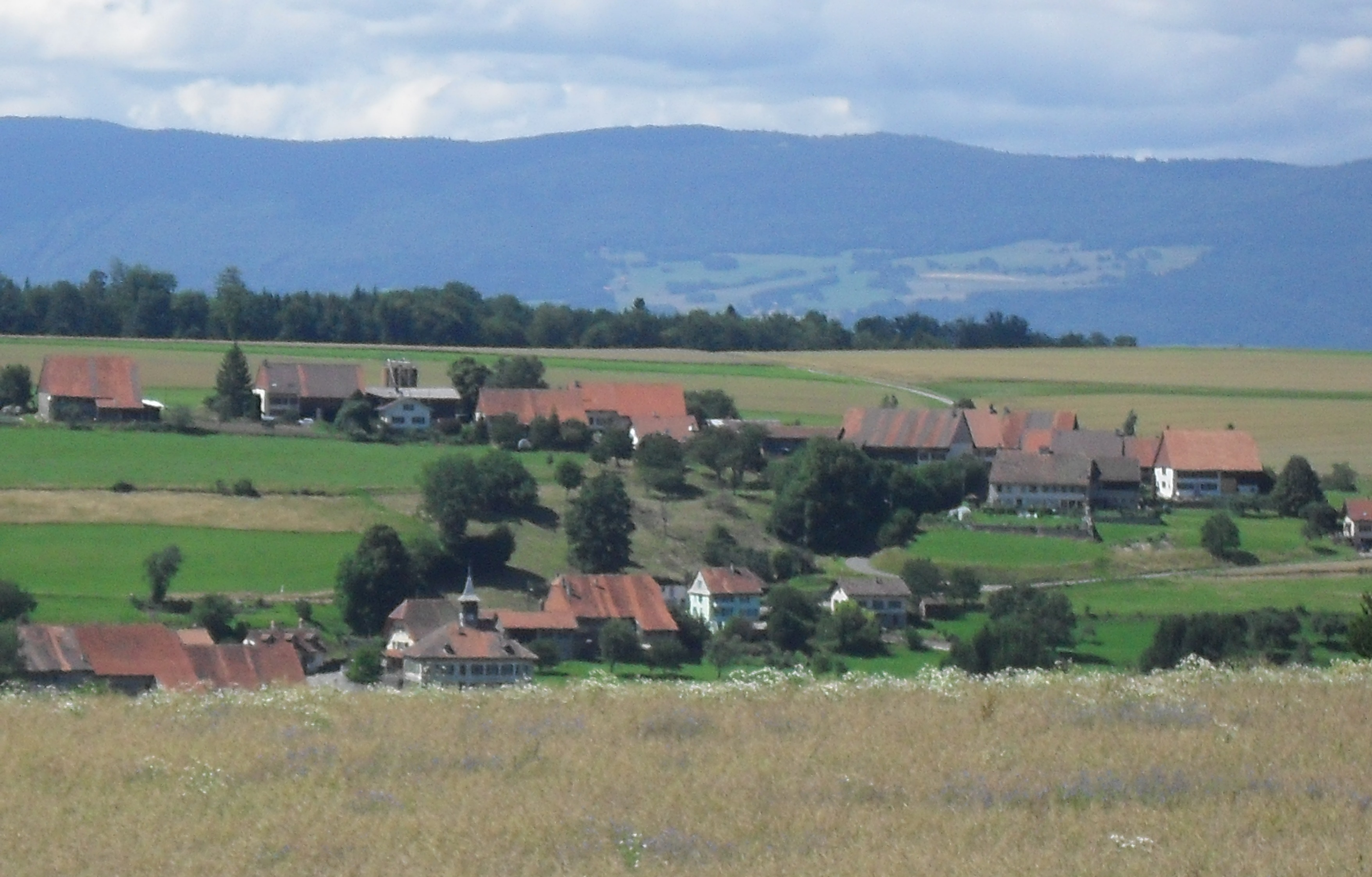

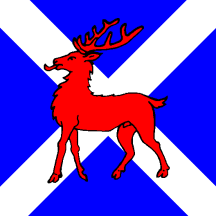
- Flag Coat of arms
- Location of Denezy
- Location within Switzerland Location within Canton of Vaud
- Coordinates: 46°43′N 6°47′E
- Country: Switzerland
- Canton: Vaud
- District: Gros-de-Vaud

Area
  - Total: 3.79 km^{2} (1.46 sq mi)
- Elevation: 744 m (2,441 ft)

Population (2011)
  - Total: 141
  - Density: 37.2/km^{2} (96.4/sq mi)
- Time zone: UTC+01:00 (CET)
  - Summer (DST): UTC+02:00 (CEST)
- Postal code: 1410
- SFOS number: 5670
- ISO 3166 code: CH-VD
- Surrounded by: Combremont-le-Petit, Neyruz-sur-Moudon, Prévondavaux (FR), Thierrens, Villars-le-Comte, Vuissens (FR)
- Website: www.denezy.ch

Denezy is a former municipality in the district of Gros-de-Vaud in the canton of Vaud in Switzerland. The municipalities of Chapelle-sur-Moudon, Correvon, Denezy, Martherenges, Neyruz-sur-Moudon, Peyres-Possens, Saint-Cierges, Thierrens and Chanéaz merged on 1 January 2013 into the new municipality of Montanaire.

== History ==
Denezy is first mentioned in 929 as villare Donaciaco. In 1142 it was mentioned as Danisei.

== Geography ==
Denezy had an area, as of 2009, of 3.8 square kilometers (1.5 mi^{2}). Of this area, 2.73 km^{2} (1.05 mi^{2}) or 72.0% is used for agricultural purposes, while 0.88 km^{2} (0.34 mi^{2}) or 23.2% is forested. Of the rest of the land, 0.2 km^{2} (0.077 mi^{2}) or 5.3% is settled (buildings or roads).

Of the built up area, housing and buildings made up 2.9% and transportation infrastructure made up 2.4%. Out of the forested land, 20.6% of the total land area is heavily forested and 2.6% is covered with orchards or small clusters of trees. Of the agricultural land, 49.3% is used for growing crops and 22.2% is pastures.

The former municipality was part of the Moudon District until it was dissolved on 31 August 2006, and Denezy became part of the new district of Gros-de-Vaud.

The former municipality is located on the road between Lausanne and Estavayer.

== Coat of arms ==
The blazon of the municipal coat of arms is Azure, a Saltire Argent, a Buck statant Gules overall.

== Demographics ==
Denezy had a population (as of 2011) of 141. As of 2008, 6.4% of the population are resident foreign nationals. Over the last 10 years (1999–2009 ) the population has changed at a rate of 10%. It has changed at a rate of 16.2% due to migration and at a rate of -6.2% due to births and deaths.

Most of the population (as of 2000) speaks French (112 or 91.8%), with German being second most common (7 or 5.7%) and Italian being third (1 or 0.8%).

Of the population in the municipality 48 or about 39.3% were born in Denezy and lived there in 2000. There were 43 or 35.2% who were born in the same canton, while 18 or 14.8% were born somewhere else in Switzerland, and 9 or 7.4% were born outside of Switzerland.

In 2008 there were no live births to Swiss citizens and there were 2 deaths of Swiss citizens. Ignoring immigration and emigration, the population of Swiss citizens decreased by 2 while the foreign population remained the same. There was 1 Swiss woman who emigrated from Switzerland. The total Swiss population change in 2008 (from all sources, including moves across municipal borders) was an increase of 6 and the non-Swiss population increased by 1 people. This represents a population growth rate of 5.2%.

The age distribution, as of 2009, in Denezy is; 11 children or 7.7% of the population are between 0 and 9 years old and 11 teenagers or 7.7% are between 10 and 19. Of the adult population, 11 people or 7.7% of the population are between 20 and 29 years old. 22 people or 15.4% are between 30 and 39, 19 people or 13.3% are between 40 and 49, and 17 people or 11.9% are between 50 and 59. The senior population distribution is 20 people or 14.0% of the population are between 60 and 69 years old, 16 people or 11.2% are between 70 and 79, there are 13 people or 9.1% who are between 80 and 89, and there are 3 people or 2.1% who are 90 and older.

As of 2000, there were 38 people who were single and never married in the municipality. There were 60 married individuals, 18 widows or widowers and 6 individuals who are divorced.

As of 2000, there were 60 private households in the municipality, and an average of 2. persons per household. There were 24 households that consist of only one person and 2 households with five or more people. Out of a total of 60 households that answered this question, 40.0% were households made up of just one person. Of the rest of the households, there are 19 married couples without children, 13 married couples with children There were 2 single parents with a child or children. There were 2 households that were made up of unrelated people.

In 2000 there were 26 single family homes (or 46.4% of the total) out of a total of 56 inhabited buildings. There were 7 multi-family buildings (12.5%), along with 18 multi-purpose buildings that were mostly used for housing (32.1%) and 5 other use buildings (commercial or industrial) that also had some housing (8.9%). Of the single family homes 13 were built before 1919, while 3 were built between 1990 and 2000. The most multi-family homes (7) were built before 1919.

In 2000 there were 72 apartments in the municipality. The most common apartment size was 3 rooms of which there were 16. There were 1 single room apartments and 30 apartments with five or more rooms. Of these apartments, a total of 56 apartments (77.8% of the total) were permanently occupied, while 5 apartments (6.9%) were seasonally occupied and 11 apartments (15.3%) were empty. As of 2009, the construction rate of new housing units was 7 new units per 1000 residents. The vacancy rate for the municipality, in 2010, was 0%.

The historical population is given in the following chart:

== Sights ==
The entire village of Denezy is designated as part of the Inventory of Swiss Heritage Sites.

== Politics ==
In the 2007 federal election the most popular party was the SVP which received 32.07% of the vote. The next three most popular parties were the SP (24.51%), the Green Party (14.58%) and the FDP (10.04%). In the federal election, a total of 52 votes were cast, and the voter turnout was 50.0%.

== Economy ==
As of 2010, Denezy had an unemployment rate of 0.6%. As of 2008, there were 18 people employed in the primary economic sector and about 7 businesses involved in this sector. No one was employed in the secondary sector. 8 people were employed in the tertiary sector, with 3 businesses in this sector. There were 56 residents of the municipality who were employed in some capacity, of which females made up 46.4% of the workforce.

In 2008 the total number of full-time equivalent jobs was 17. The number of jobs in the primary sector was 10, all of which were in agriculture. There were no jobs in the secondary sector. The number of jobs in the tertiary sector was 7. In the tertiary sector; 2 or 28.6% were in wholesale or retail sales or the repair of motor vehicles, 4 or 57.1% were in the information industry, 2 or 28.6% were in education.

In 2000, there were 7 workers who commuted into the municipality and 33 workers who commuted away. The municipality is a net exporter of workers, with about 4.7 workers leaving the municipality for every one entering. Of the working population, 0% used public transportation to get to work, and 64.3% used a private car.

== Religion ==
From the 2000 census, 20 or 16.4% were Roman Catholic, while 80 or 65.6% belonged to the Swiss Reformed Church. 19 (or about 15.57% of the population) belonged to no church, are agnostic or atheist, and 3 individuals (or about 2.46% of the population) did not answer the question.

== Education ==
In Denezy about 42 or (34.4%) of the population have completed non-mandatory upper secondary education, and 14 or (11.5%) have completed additional higher education (either university or a Fachhochschule). Of the 14 who completed tertiary schooling, 64.3% were Swiss men, 28.6% were Swiss women.

In the 2009/2010 school year there were a total of 10 students in the Denezy school district. In the Vaud cantonal school system, two years of non-obligatory pre-school are provided by the political districts. During the school year, the political district provided pre-school care for a total of 296 children of which 96 children (32.4%) received subsidized pre-school care. The canton's primary school program requires students to attend for four years. There were 7 students in the municipal primary school program. The obligatory lower secondary school program lasts for six years and there were 3 students in those schools.

As of 2000, there were 15 students in Denezy who came from another municipality, while 9 residents attended schools outside the municipality.
