= Neyruz-sur-Moudon =

- Former municipality
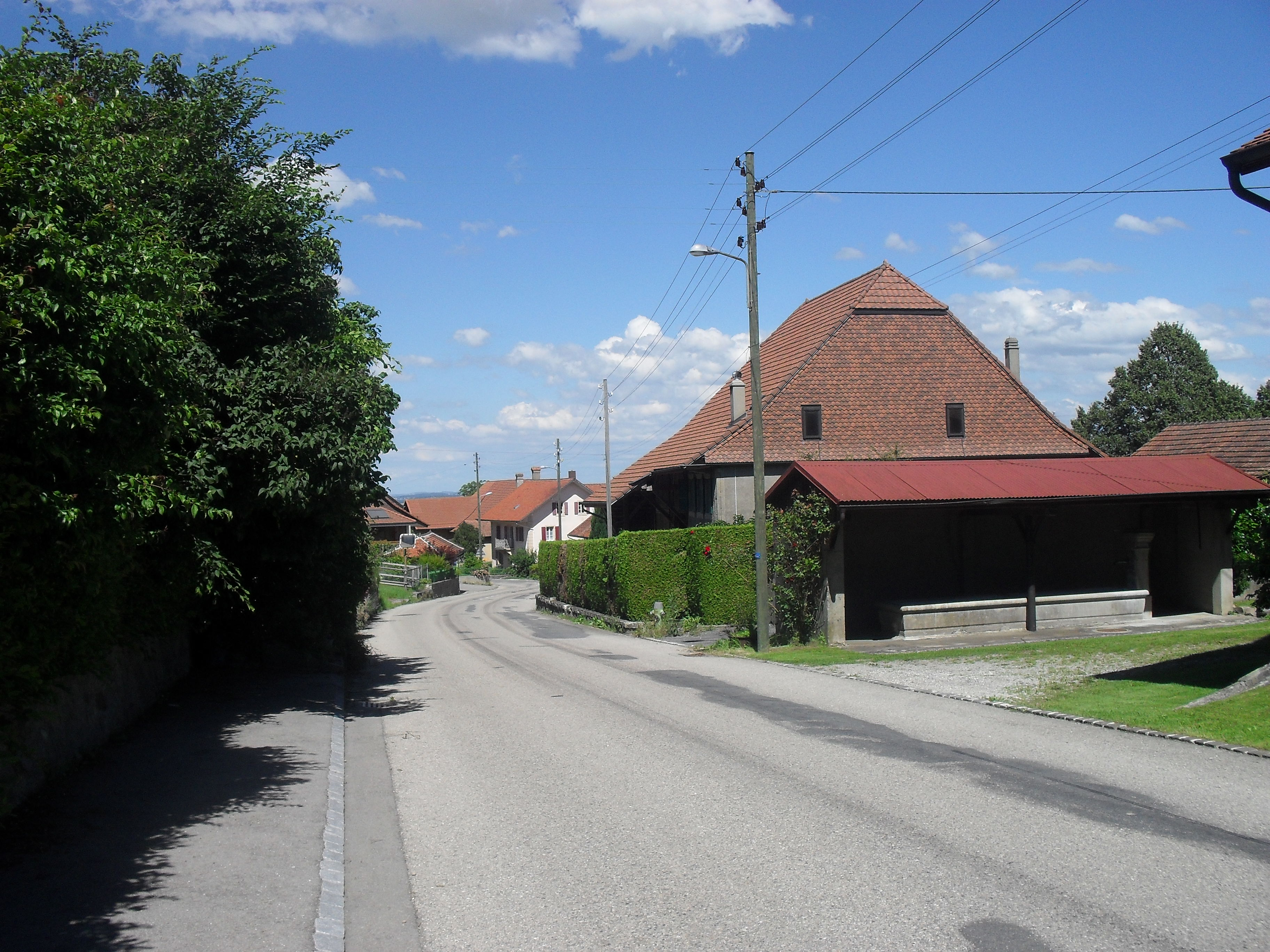

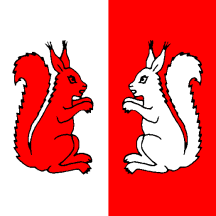
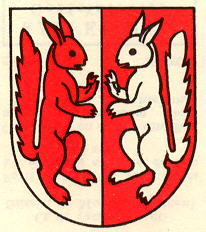
- Flag Coat of arms
- Location of Neyruz-sur-Moudon
- Location within Switzerland Location within Canton of Vaud
- Coordinates: 46°42′N 6°47′E
- Country: Switzerland
- Canton: Vaud
- District: Gros-de-Vaud

Area
  - Total: 3.52 km^{2} (1.36 sq mi)
- Elevation: 765 m (2,510 ft)

Population (2011)
  - Total: 130
  - Density: 37/km^{2} (96/sq mi)
- Time zone: UTC+01:00 (CET)
  - Summer (DST): UTC+02:00 (CEST)
- Postal code: 1515
- SFOS number: 5679
- ISO 3166 code: CH-VD
- Surrounded by: Bussy-sur-Moudon, Denezy, Moudon, Oulens-sur-Lucens, Saint-Cierges, Thierrens, Villars-le-Comte
- Website: Profile (in French), SFSO statistics

Neyruz-sur-Moudon is a former municipality in the district Gros-de-Vaud in the canton of Vaud in Switzerland. The municipalities of Chapelle-sur-Moudon, Correvon, Denezy, Martherenges, Neyruz-sur-Moudon, Peyres-Possens, Saint-Cierges, Thierrens and Chanéaz merged on 1 January 2013 into the new municipality of Montanaire.

== History ==
Neyruz-sur-Moudon is first mentioned in 1147 as Noeruls and Nuruls. It was first called Neyruz-sur-Moudon in 1953.

== Geography ==
Aerial view (1964)

Neyruz-sur-Moudon had an area, as of 2009, of 3.5 square kilometers (1.4 mi^{2}). Of this area, 2.46 km^{2} (0.95 mi^{2}) or 69.9% is used for agricultural purposes, while 0.93 km^{2} (0.36 mi^{2}) or 26.4% is forested. Of the rest of the land, 0.12 km^{2} (30 acres) or 3.4% is settled (buildings or roads) and 0.01 km^{2} (2.5 acres) or 0.3% is unproductive land.

Of the built up area, housing and buildings made up 0.9% and transportation infrastructure made up 2.3%. Out of the forested land, all of the forested land area is covered with heavy forests. Of the agricultural land, 48.9% is used for growing crops and 20.2% is pastures.

The former municipality was part of the Moudon District until it was dissolved on 31 August 2006, and Neyruz-sur-Moudon became part of the new district of Gros-de-Vaud.

The former municipality is located along the Moudon to Yverdon-les-Bains road. It consists of the haufendorf village (an irregular, unplanned and quite closely packed village, built around a central square) of Neyruz-sur-Moudon and the settlements of La Praire, Les Rutannes and Le Moulin Tardy.

== Coat of arms ==
The blazon of the municipal coat of arms is Per pale Argent and Gules, two Squirrels counterchanged.

== Demographics ==
Neyruz-sur-Moudon has a population (as of 2011) of 130. As of 2008, 7.5% of the population are resident foreign nationals. Over the last 10 years (1999–2009) the population has changed at a rate of 10.3%. It has changed at a rate of 0% due to migration and at a rate of 9.5% due to births and deaths.

Most of the population (as of 2000) speaks French (117 or 97.5%), with German being second most common (2 or 1.7%) and Albanian being third (1 or 0.8%).

Of the population in the municipality 47 or about 39.2% were born in Neyruz-sur-Moudon and lived there in 2000. There were 47 or 39.2% who were born in the same canton, while 15 or 12.5% were born somewhere else in Switzerland, and 10 or 8.3% were born outside of Switzerland.

In 2008 there were 2 live births to Swiss citizens, 1 death of a Swiss citizen and 1 non-Swiss citizen death. Ignoring immigration and emigration, the population of Swiss citizens increased by 1 while the foreign population decreased by 1. The total Swiss population change in 2008 (from all sources, including moves across municipal borders) was a decrease of 1 and the non-Swiss population decreased by 1 people. This represents a population growth rate of -1.5%.

The age distribution, as of 2009, in Neyruz-sur-Moudon is; 17 children or 12.3% of the population are between 0 and 9 years old and 12 teenagers or 8.7% are between 10 and 19. Of the adult population, 20 people or 14.5% of the population are between 20 and 29 years old. 22 people or 15.9% are between 30 and 39, 17 people or 12.3% are between 40 and 49, and 20 people or 14.5% are between 50 and 59. The senior population distribution is 14 people or 10.1% of the population are between 60 and 69 years old, 10 people or 7.2% are between 70 and 79, there are 5 people or 3.6% who are between 80 and 89, and there is 1 person who is 90 and older.

As of 2000, there were 49 people who were single and never married in the municipality. There were 64 married individuals, 6 widows or widowers and 1 individuals who are divorced.

As of 2000, there were 48 private households in the municipality, and an average of 2.5 persons per household. There were 12 households that consist of only one person and 4 households with five or more people. Out of a total of 49 households that answered this question, 24.5% were households made up of just one person. Of the rest of the households, there are 19 married couples without children, 14 married couples with children There were 2 single parents with a child or children. There was 1 household that was made up of unrelated people and 1 household that was made up of some sort of institution or another collective housing.

In 2000 there were 15 single family homes (or 38.5% of the total) out of a total of 39 inhabited buildings. There were 6 multi-family buildings (15.4%), along with 16 multi-purpose buildings that were mostly used for housing (41.0%) and 2 other use buildings (commercial or industrial) that also had some housing (5.1%). Of the single family homes 8 were built before 1919, while 1 was built between 1990 and 2000. The most multi-family homes (4) were built before 1919 and the next most (1) were built between 1919 and 1945.

In 2000 there were 53 apartments in the municipality. The most common apartment size was 4 rooms of which there were 15. There were single room apartments and 23 apartments with five or more rooms. Of these apartments, a total of 46 apartments (86.8% of the total) were permanently occupied, while 4 apartments (7.5%) were seasonally occupied and 3 apartments (5.7%) were empty. As of 2009, the construction rate of new housing units was 0 new units per 1000 residents. The vacancy rate for the municipality, in 2010, was 0%.

The historical population is given in the following chart:

== Politics ==
In the 2007 federal election the most popular party was the SVP which received 42.78% of the vote. The next three most popular parties were the SP (17.63%), the Green Party (15.23%) and the FDP (8.06%). In the federal election, a total of 65 votes were cast, and the voter turnout was 67.0%.

== Economy ==
As of 2010, Neyruz-sur-Moudon had an unemployment rate of 1%. As of 2008, there were 17 people employed in the primary economic sector and about 9 businesses involved in this sector. No one was employed in the secondary sector. 4 people were employed in the tertiary sector, with 2 businesses in this sector. There were 66 residents of the municipality who were employed in some capacity, of which females made up 42.4% of the workforce.

In 2008 the total number of full-time equivalent jobs was 12. The number of jobs in the primary sector was 8, all of which were in agriculture. There were no jobs in the secondary sector. The number of jobs in the tertiary sector was 4 of which 2 were in a hotel or restaurant and 2 were in education.

In 2000, there were 44 workers who commuted away from the municipality. Of the working population, 1.5% used public transportation to get to work, and 66.7% used a private car.

== Religion ==
From the 2000 census, 12 or 10.0% were Roman Catholic, while 90 or 75.0% belonged to the Swiss Reformed Church. Of the rest of the population, there was 1 individual who belongs to the Christian Catholic Church, and there were 10 individuals (or about 8.33% of the population) who belonged to another Christian church. There was 1 individual who was Islamic. 10 (or about 8.33% of the population) belonged to no church, are agnostic or atheist, and 1 individual (or about 0.83% of the population) did not answer the question.

== Education ==
In Neyruz-sur-Moudon about 52 or (43.3%) of the population have completed non-mandatory upper secondary education, and 14 or (11.7%) have completed additional higher education (either university or a Fachhochschule). Of the 14 who completed tertiary schooling, 71.4% were Swiss men, 21.4% were Swiss women.

In the 2009/2010 school year there were a total of 14 students in the Neyruz-sur-Moudon school district. In the Vaud cantonal school system, two years of non-obligatory pre-school are provided by the political districts. During the school year, the political district provided pre-school care for a total of 296 children of which 96 children (32.4%) received subsidized pre-school care. The canton's primary school program requires students to attend for four years. There were 13 students in the municipal primary school program. The obligatory lower secondary school program lasts for six years and there was 1 student in the secondary school

As of 2000, there were 6 students in Neyruz-sur-Moudon who came from another municipality, while 16 residents attended schools outside the municipality.
