= Boulens =

- Municipality
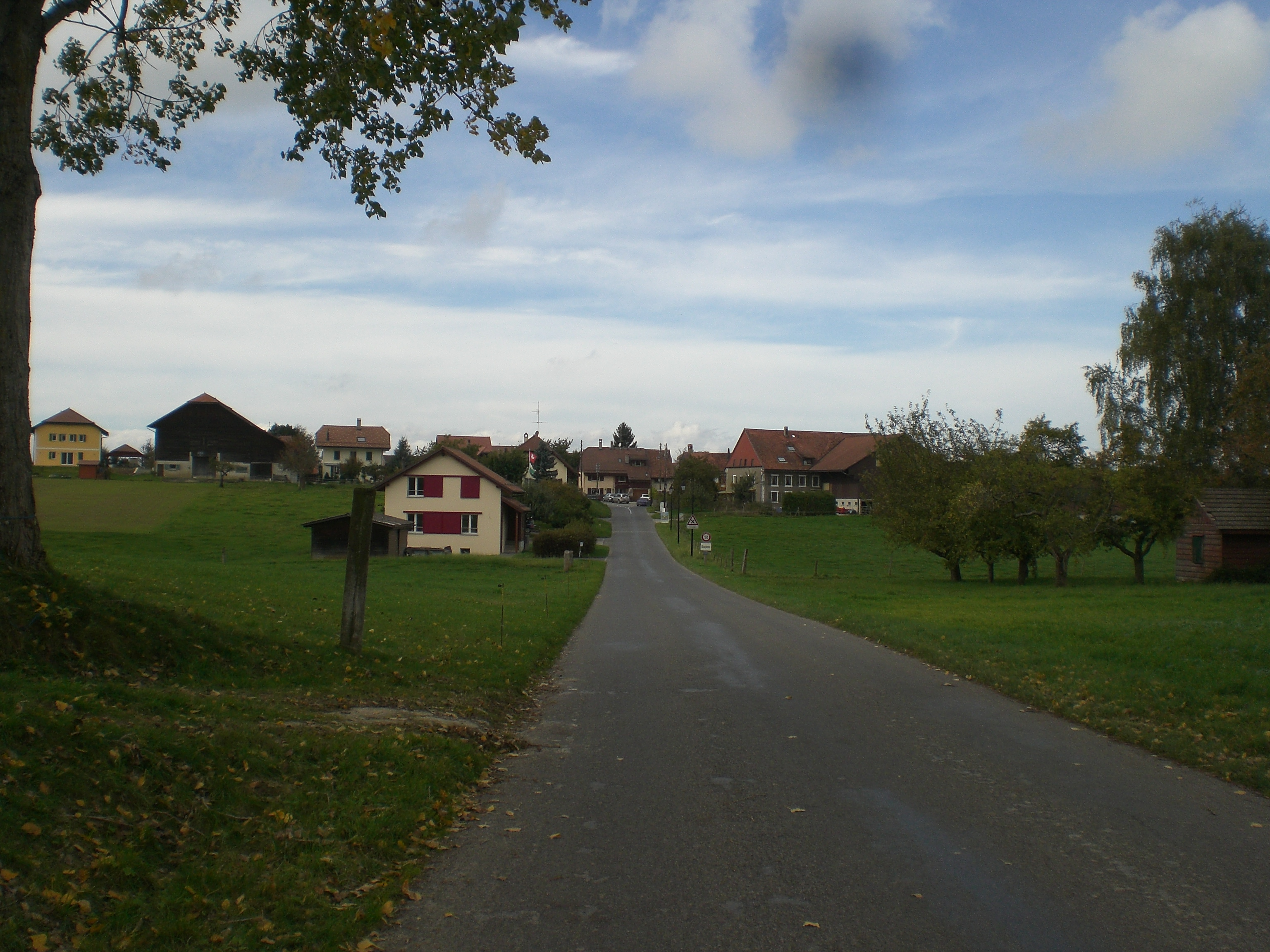

- Flag Coat of arms
- Location of Boulens
- Location within Switzerland Location within Canton of Vaud
- Coordinates: 46°41′N 6°43′E
- Country: Switzerland
- Canton: Vaud
- District: Gros-de-Vaud

Government
  - Mayor: Syndic

Area
  - Total: 3.4 km^{2} (1.3 sq mi)
- Elevation: 718 m (2,356 ft)

Population (2003)
  - Total: 229
  - Density: 67/km^{2} (170/sq mi)
- Time zone: UTC+01:00 (CET)
  - Summer (DST): UTC+02:00 (CEST)
- Postal code: 1063
- SFOS number: 5661
- ISO 3166 code: CH-VD
- Surrounded by: Bercher, Chapelle-sur-Moudon, Fey, Peyres-Possens, Saint-Cierges
- Website: www.boulens.ch

Boulens is a municipality in the district Gros-de-Vaud in the canton of Vaud in Switzerland.

== History ==
Boulens is first mentioned in 1142 as Bollens. In 1177 it was mentioned as Boslens.

== Geography ==
Boulens has an area, as of 2009, of 3.4 square kilometers (1.3 mi^{2}). Of this area, 2.11 km^{2} (0.81 mi^{2}) or 61.3% is used for agricultural purposes, while 1.12 km^{2} (0.43 mi^{2}) or 32.6% is forested. Of the rest of the land, 0.17 km^{2} (0.066 mi^{2}) or 4.9% is settled (buildings or roads), 0.01 km^{2} (2.5 acres) or 0.3% is either rivers or lakes and 0.01 km^{2} (2.5 acres) or 0.3% is unproductive land.

Of the built up area, housing and buildings made up 2.6% and transportation infrastructure made up 1.7%. Out of the forested land, all of the forested land area is covered with heavy forests. Of the agricultural land, 47.1% is used for growing crops and 14.2% is pastures. All the water in the municipality is flowing water.

The municipality was part of the Moudon District until it was dissolved on 31 August 2006, and Boulens became part of the new district of Gros-de-Vaud.

== Coat of arms ==
The blazon of the municipal coat of arms is Azure, two crossed scythes Or, in chief of the second a bar and a pale of the first counterchanged.

== Demographics ==
Boulens has a population (as of December 2020) of 369. As of 2008, 6.3% of the population are resident foreign nationals. Over the last 10 years (1999-2009 ) the population has changed at a rate of 27.7%. It has changed at a rate of 29.5% due to migration and at a rate of -1.8% due to births and deaths.

Most of the population (as of 2000) speaks French (190 or 90.0%), with German being second most common (13 or 6.2%) and Portuguese being third (4 or 1.9%). There is 1 person who speaks Italian.

Of the population in the municipality 79 or about 37.4% were born in Boulens and lived there in 2000. There were 82 or 38.9% who were born in the same canton, while 29 or 13.7% were born somewhere else in Switzerland, and 21 or 10.0% were born outside of Switzerland.

In 2008 there were 4 live births to Swiss citizens and were 3 deaths of Swiss citizens. Ignoring immigration and emigration, the population of Swiss citizens increased by 1 while the foreign population remained the same. At the same time, there was 1 non-Swiss man who immigrated from another country to Switzerland. The total Swiss population change in 2008 (from all sources, including moves across municipal borders) was an increase of 14 and the non-Swiss population increased by 2 people. This represents a population growth rate of 5.9%.

The age distribution, as of 2009, in Boulens is; 29 children or 10.3% of the population are between 0 and 9 years old and 46 teenagers or 16.4% are between 10 and 19. Of the adult population, 28 people or 10.0% of the population are between 20 and 29 years old. 38 people or 13.5% are between 30 and 39, 41 people or 14.6% are between 40 and 49, and 32 people or 11.4% are between 50 and 59. The senior population distribution is 35 people or 12.5% of the population are between 60 and 69 years old, 20 people or 7.1% are between 70 and 79, there are 12 people or 4.3% who are between 80 and 89.

As of 2000, there were 90 people who were single and never married in the municipality. There were 99 married individuals, 14 widows or widowers and 8 individuals who are divorced.

As of 2000, there were 78 private households in the municipality, and an average of 2.7 persons per household. There were 21 households that consist of only one person and 10 households with five or more people. Out of a total of 79 households that answered this question, 26.6% were households made up of just one person. Of the rest of the households, there are 19 married couples without children and 36 married couples with children. There were 2 single parents with a child or children.

In 2000 there were 33 single family homes (or 54.1% of the total) out of a total of 61 inhabited buildings. There were 14 multi-family buildings (23.0%) and along with 14 multi-purpose buildings that were mostly used for housing (23.0%). Of the single family homes 17 were built before 1919, while 4 were built between 1990 and 2000. The most multi-family homes (4) were built before 1919 and the next most (3) were built between 1971 and 1980. There was 1 multi-family house built between 1996 and 2000.

In 2000 there were 85 apartments in the municipality. The most common apartment size was 4 rooms of which there were 25. There were 3 single room apartments and 38 apartments with five or more rooms. Of these apartments, a total of 74 apartments (87.1% of the total) were permanently occupied, while 5 apartments (5.9%) were seasonally occupied and 6 apartments (7.1%) were empty. As of 2009, the construction rate of new housing units was 0 new units per 1000 residents. The vacancy rate for the municipality, in 2010, was 0.93%.

The historical population is given in the following chart:

== Politics ==
In the 2007 federal election the most popular party was the SVP which received 26.81% of the vote. The next three most popular parties were the FDP (17.98%), the SP (15.79%) and the Green Party (14.36%). In the federal election, a total of 108 votes were cast, and the voter turnout was 59.3%.

== Economy ==
As of 2010, Boulens had an unemployment rate of 2.3%. As of 2008, there were 22 people employed in the primary economic sector and about 8 businesses involved in this sector. 26 people were employed in the secondary sector and there were 3 businesses in this sector. 8 people were employed in the tertiary sector, with 4 businesses in this sector. There were 99 residents of the municipality who were employed in some capacity, of which females made up 40.4% of the workforce.

In 2008 the total number of full-time equivalent jobs was 48. The number of jobs in the primary sector was 16, all of which were in agriculture. The number of jobs in the secondary sector was 25 of which 7 or (28.0%) were in manufacturing and 17 (68.0%) were in construction. The number of jobs in the tertiary sector was 7. In the tertiary sector; 1 was in a hotel or restaurant, 3 or 42.9% were in the information industry, 1 was a technical professional or scientist, .

In 2000, there were 11 workers who commuted into the municipality and 67 workers who commuted away. The municipality is a net exporter of workers, with about 6.1 workers leaving the municipality for every one entering. Of the working population, 7.1% used public transportation to get to work, and 58.6% used a private car.

== Religion ==
From the 2000 census, 31 or 14.7% were Roman Catholic, while 144 or 68.2% belonged to the Swiss Reformed Church. Of the rest of the population, there were 3 individuals (or about 1.42% of the population) who belonged to another Christian church. There were 2 (or about 0.95% of the population) who were Islamic. There was 1 person who was Buddhist. 31 (or about 14.69% of the population) belonged to no church, are agnostic or atheist.

== Education ==
In Boulens about 92 or (43.6%) of the population have completed non-mandatory upper secondary education, and 21 or (10.0%) have completed additional higher education (either university or a Fachhochschule). Of the 21 who completed tertiary schooling, 66.7% were Swiss men, 28.6% were Swiss women.

In the 2009/2010 school year there were a total of 38 students in the Boulens school district. In the Vaud cantonal school system, two years of non-obligatory pre-school are provided by the political districts. During the school year, the political district provided pre-school care for a total of 296 children of which 96 children (32.4%) received subsidized pre-school care. The canton's primary school program requires students to attend for four years. There were 18 students in the municipal primary school program. The obligatory lower secondary school program lasts for six years and there were 19 students in those schools. There were also 1 students who were home schooled or attended another non-traditional school.

As of 2000, there were 43 students from Boulens who attended schools outside the municipality.
