= Montilliez =

- Municipality
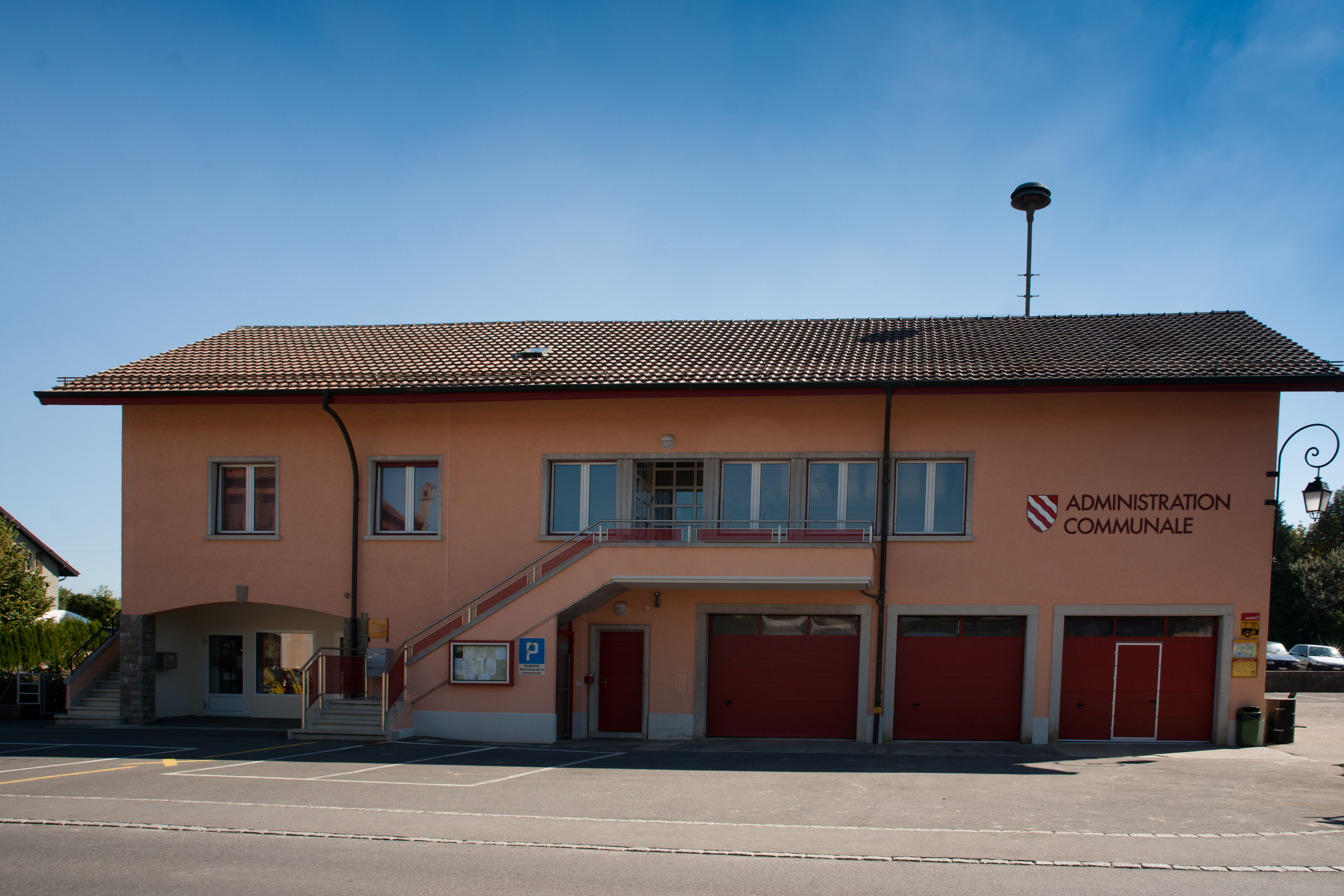
- Poliez-le-Grand town hall

- Flag Coat of arms
- Location of Montilliez
- Location within Switzerland Location within Canton of Vaud
- Coordinates: 46°39′N 6°40′E
- Country: Switzerland
- Canton: Vaud
- District: Gros-de-Vaud

Government
  - Mayor: Syndic

Area
  - Total: 15.1 km^{2} (5.8 sq mi)

Population (December 2009)
  - Total: 309
  - Density: 20.5/km^{2} (53.0/sq mi)
- Time zone: UTC+01:00 (CET)
  - Summer (DST): UTC+02:00 (CEST)
- SFOS number: 5540
- ISO 3166 code: CH-VD
- Surrounded by: Fey, Villars-le-Terroir
- Website: http://www.montilliez.ch Profile (in French), SFSO statistics

Montilliez is a municipality in the district of Gros-de-Vaud in the canton of Vaud in Switzerland.

The municipalities of Dommartin, Naz, Poliez-le-Grand and Sugnens merged on 1 July 2011 into the new municipality of Montilliez.

== History ==
Dommartin is first mentioned in 908 as Domno Martino villa. Naz is first mentioned around 1200 as Nars. Poliez-le-Grand is first mentioned around 1160-79 as Poleto. In 1225 it was mentioned as Pollie lo Grant. Sugnens is first mentioned in 1177 as Sugnens.

== Geography ==
Montilliez has an area, as of 2009, of 15.07 square kilometers (5.82 mi^{2}). Of this area, 10.13 km^{2} (3.91 mi^{2}) or 67.2% is used for agricultural purposes, while 3.72 km^{2} (1.44 mi^{2}) or 24.7% is forested. Of the rest of the land, 1.05 km^{2} (0.41 mi^{2}) or 7.0% is settled (buildings or roads).

== Transport ==
The municipality has a railway station, Sugnens, on the suburban Lausanne–Bercher line.

== Historic Population ==
The historical population is given in the following chart:
