= Naz, Vaud =

Naz
- Former municipality
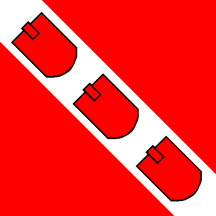
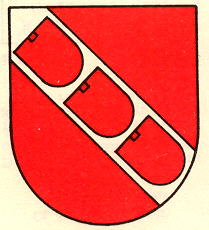
- Flag Coat of arms
- Location of Naz
- Location within Switzerland Location within Canton of Vaud
- Coordinates: 46°40′N 6°42′E
- Country: Switzerland
- Canton: Vaud
- District: Gros-de-Vaud

Area
  - Total: 1.17 km^{2} (0.45 sq mi)
- Elevation: 675 m (2,215 ft)

Population (December 2009)
  - Total: 137
  - Density: 117/km^{2} (303/sq mi)
- Time zone: UTC+01:00 (CET)
  - Summer (DST): UTC+02:00 (CEST)
- Postal code: 1041
- SFOS number: 5528
- ISO 3166 code: CH-VD
- Surrounded by: Dommartin, Poliez-le-Grand, Sugnens, Fey, Peyres-Possens.
- Website: Profile (in French), SFSO statistics

Naz is a former municipality in the district of Gros-de-Vaud in the canton of Vaud in Switzerland.

The municipalities of Dommartin, Naz, Poliez-le-Grand and Sugnens merged on 1 July 2011 into the new municipality of Montilliez.

== History ==
Naz is first mentioned around 1200 as Nars.

== Geography ==
Naz has an area, as of 2009, of 1.17 square kilometers (0.45 sq mi). Of this area, 0.81 km^{2} (0.31 sq mi) or 69.2% is used for agricultural purposes, while 0.25 km^{2} (0.097 sq mi) or 21.4% is forested. Of the rest of the land, 0.08 km^{2} (20 acres) or 6.8% is settled (buildings or roads).

Of the built up area, housing and buildings made up 3.4% and transportation infrastructure made up 3.4%. Out of the forested land, all of the forested land area is covered with heavy forests. Of the agricultural land, 53.8% is used for growing crops and 15.4% is pastures.

The municipality was part of the Echallens District until it was dissolved on 31 August 2006, and Naz became part of the new district of Gros-de-Vaud.

== Coat of arms ==
The blazon of the municipal coat of arms is Gules, on a Bend Argent three Shovels bendwise Gules.

== Demographics ==
Naz has a population (as of 2009) of 137. As of 2008, 13.4% of the population are resident foreign nationals. Over the last 10 years (1999–2009 ) the population has changed at a rate of 52.2%. It has changed at a rate of 33.3% due to migration and at a rate of 18.9% due to births and deaths.

Most of the population (as of 2000) speaks French (87 or 95.6%) with the rest speaking German

Of the population in the municipality 29 or about 31.9% were born in Naz and lived there in 2000. There were 35 or 38.5% who were born in the same canton, while 18 or 19.8% were born somewhere else in Switzerland, and 6 or 6.6% were born outside of Switzerland.

In 2008 there were 5 live births to Swiss citizens and 1 death of a Swiss citizen. Ignoring immigration and emigration, the population of Swiss citizens increased by 4 while the foreign population remained the same. The total Swiss population change in 2008 (from all sources, including moves across municipal borders) was an increase of 7 and the non-Swiss population increased by 6 people. This represents a population growth rate of 10.1%.

The age distribution, as of 2009, in Naz is; 30 children or 22.1% of the population are between 0 and 9 years old and 19 teenagers or 14.0% are between 10 and 19. Of the adult population, 14 people or 10.3% of the population are between 20 and 29 years old. 26 people or 19.1% are between 30 and 39, 24 people or 17.6% are between 40 and 49, and 16 people or 11.8% are between 50 and 59. The senior population distribution is 4 people or 2.9% of the population are between 60 and 69 years old, 3 people or 2.2% are between 70 and 79, there are people or 0.0% who are between 80 and 89.

As of 2000, there were 47 people who were single and never married in the municipality. There were 41 married individuals, 2 widows or widowers and 1 individuals who are divorced.

As of 2000 the average number of residents per living room was 0.63 which is about equal to the cantonal average of 0.61 per room. In this case, a room is defined as space of a housing unit of at least 4 m^{2} (43 sq ft) as normal bedrooms, dining rooms, living rooms, kitchens and habitable cellars and attics. About 62.5% of the total households were owner occupied, or in other words did not pay rent (though they may have a mortgage or a rent-to-own agreement).

As of 2000, there were 26 private households in the municipality, and an average of 3.3 persons per household. There were 4 households that consist of only one person and 6 households with five or more people. Out of a total of 29 households that answered this question, 13.8% were households made up of just one person. Of the rest of the households, there are 5 married couples without children, 16 married couples with children There was one single parent with a child or children.

In 2000 there were 14 single family homes (or 46.7% of the total) out of a total of 30 inhabited buildings. There was 1 multi-family building (3.3%), along with 10 multi-purpose buildings that were mostly used for housing (33.3%) and 5 other use buildings (commercial or industrial) that also had some housing (16.7%). Of the single family homes 6 were built before 1919, while 6 were built between 1990 and 2000. The multi-family building was built between 1996 and 2000.

In 2000 there were 35 apartments in the municipality. The most common apartment size was 5 rooms of which there were 9. There were 1 single room apartments and 21 apartments with five or more rooms. Of these apartments, a total of 24 apartments (68.6% of the total) were permanently occupied, while 6 apartments (17.1%) were seasonally occupied and 5 apartments (14.3%) were empty. As of 2009, the construction rate of new housing units was 0 new units per 1000 residents. The vacancy rate for the municipality, in 2010, was 0%.

The historical population is given in the following chart:

== Politics ==
In the 2007 federal election the most popular party was the SVP which received 39.74% of the vote. The next three most popular parties were the Green Party (24.07%), the SP (16.64%) and the PdA Party (6.62%). In the federal election, a total of 39 votes were cast, and the voter turnout was 52.0%.

== Economy ==
As of 2010, Naz had an unemployment rate of 3%. As of 2008, there were 11 people employed in the primary economic sector and about 4 businesses involved in this sector. No one was employed in the secondary sector. 1 person was employed in the tertiary sector, with 1 business in this sector. There were 43 residents of the municipality who were employed in some capacity, of which females made up 48.8% of the workforce.

In 2008 the total number of full-time equivalent jobs was 7. The number of jobs in the primary sector was 6, all of which were in agriculture. There were no jobs in the secondary sector. The number of jobs in the tertiary sector was 1, in the sale or repair of motor vehicles.

In 2000, there were 3 workers who commuted into the municipality and 35 workers who commuted away. The municipality is a net exporter of workers, with about 11.7 workers leaving the municipality for every one entering. Of the working population, 2.3% used public transportation to get to work, and 79.1% used a private car.

== Religion ==
From the 2000 census, 17 or 18.7% were Roman Catholic, while 56 or 61.5% belonged to the Swiss Reformed Church. 15 (or about 16.48% of the population) belonged to no church, are agnostic or atheist, and 3 individuals (or about 3.30% of the population) did not answer the question.

== Education ==
In Naz about 29 or (31.9%) of the population have completed non-mandatory upper secondary education, and 15 or (16.5%) have completed additional higher education (either University or a Fachhochschule). Of the 15 who completed tertiary schooling, 46.7% were Swiss men, 40.0% were Swiss women.

In the 2009/2010 school year there were a total of 30 students in the Naz school district. In the Vaud cantonal school system, two years of non-obligatory pre-school are provided by the political districts. During the school year, the political district provided pre-school care for a total of 296 children of which 96 children (32.4%) received subsidized pre-school care. The canton's primary school program requires students to attend for four years. There were 19 students in the municipal primary school program. The obligatory lower secondary school program lasts for six years and there were 11 students in those schools.

As of 2000, there were 3 students in Naz who came from another municipality, while 31 residents attended schools outside the municipality.
