= Dommartin, Vaud =

Dommartin
- Former municipality
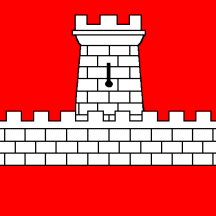
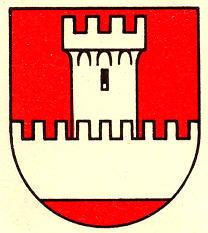
- Flag Coat of arms
- Location of Dommartin
- Location within Switzerland Location within Canton of Vaud
- Coordinates: 46°39′N 6°42′E
- Country: Switzerland
- Canton: Vaud
- District: Gros-de-Vaud

Government
  - Mayor: Syndic

Area
  - Total: 2.94 km^{2} (1.14 sq mi)
- Elevation: 730 m (2,400 ft)

Population (December 2009)
  - Total: 266
  - Density: 90.5/km^{2} (234/sq mi)
- Time zone: UTC+01:00 (CET)
  - Summer (DST): UTC+02:00 (CEST)
- Postal code: 1041
- SFOS number: 5517
- ISO 3166 code: CH-VD
- Surrounded by: Montaubion-Chardonney, Naz, Peyres-Possens, Poliez-le-Grand, Poliez-Pittet, Villars-Tiercelin
- Website: Profile (in French), SFSO statistics

Dommartin (French pronunciation: [dɔ̃maʁtɛ̃]) is a former municipality in the district of Gros-de-Vaud in the canton of Vaud in Switzerland.

The municipalities of Dommartin, Naz, Poliez-le-Grand and Sugnens merged on 1 July 2011 into the new municipality of Montilliez.

== History ==
Dommartin is first mentioned in 908 as Domno Martino villa.

== Geography ==
Aerial view (1963)

Dommartin had an area, as of 2009, of 2.94 square kilometers (1.14 sq mi). Of this area, 1.75 km^{2} (0.68 sq mi) or 59.5% is used for agricultural purposes, while 1.03 km^{2} (0.40 sq mi) or 35.0% is forested. Of the rest of the land, 0.16 km^{2} (0.062 sq mi) or 5.4% is settled (buildings or roads).

Of the built up area, housing and buildings made up 2.7% and transportation infrastructure made up 2.7%. Out of the forested land, all of the forested land area is covered with heavy forests. Of the agricultural land, 42.5% is used for growing crops and 15.6% is pastures, while 1.4% is used for orchards or vine crops.

The former municipality was part of the Echallens District until it was dissolved on 31 August 2006, and Dommartin became part of the new district of Gros-de-Vaud.

== Coat of arms ==
The blazon of the municipal coat of arms is Gules, a Wall with a Tower all embattled Argent masoned Sable.

== Demographics ==
Dommartin had a population (as of 2009) of 266. As of 2008, 8.7% of the population are resident foreign nationals. Over the last 10 years (1999-2009 ) the population has changed at a rate of 4.7%. It has changed at a rate of -0.4% due to migration and at a rate of 5.1% due to births and deaths.

Most of the population (as of 2000) speaks French (237 or 98.3%), with German being second most common (3 or 1.2%) and English being third (1 or 0.4%).

Of the population in the municipality 62 or about 25.7% were born in Dommartin and lived there in 2000. There were 117 or 48.5% who were born in the same canton, while 30 or 12.4% were born somewhere else in Switzerland, and 29 or 12.0% were born outside of Switzerland.

In 2008 there was 1 live birth to Swiss citizens and were 3 deaths of Swiss citizens. Ignoring immigration and emigration, the population of Swiss citizens decreased by 2 while the foreign population remained the same. There were 3 Swiss men and 1 Swiss woman who emigrated from Switzerland. At the same time, there was 1 non-Swiss man who immigrated from another country to Switzerland. The total Swiss population change in 2008 (from all sources, including moves across municipal borders) was a decrease of 9 and the non-Swiss population increased by 2 people. This represents a population growth rate of -2.7%.

The age distribution, as of 2009, in Dommartin is; 30 children or 11.3% of the population are between 0 and 9 years old and 30 teenagers or 11.3% are between 10 and 19. Of the adult population, 27 people or 10.2% of the population are between 20 and 29 years old. 42 people or 15.8% are between 30 and 39, 52 people or 19.5% are between 40 and 49, and 26 people or 9.8% are between 50 and 59. The senior population distribution is 34 people or 12.8% of the population are between 60 and 69 years old, 12 people or 4.5% are between 70 and 79, there are 12 people or 4.5% who are between 80 and 89, and there is 1 person who is 90 and older.

As of 2000, there were 91 people who were single and never married in the municipality. There were 122 married individuals, 12 widows or widowers and 16 individuals who are divorced.

As of 2000, there were 105 private households in the municipality, and an average of 2.3 persons per household. There were 33 households that consist of only one person and 4 households with five or more people. Out of a total of 105 households that answered this question, 31.4% were households made up of just one person. Of the rest of the households, there are 32 married couples without children, 34 married couples with children There were 6 single parents with a child or children.

In 2000 there were 40 single family homes (or 60.6% of the total) out of a total of 66 inhabited buildings. There were 13 multi-family buildings (19.7%), along with 10 multi-purpose buildings that were mostly used for housing (15.2%) and 3 other use buildings (commercial or industrial) that also had some housing (4.5%). Of the single family homes 22 were built before 1919, while 8 were built between 1990 and 2000. The most multi-family homes (6) were built before 1919 and the next most (2) were built between 1981 and 1990.

In 2000 there were 110 apartments in the municipality. The most common apartment size was 3 rooms of which there were 33. There were 3 single room apartments and 40 apartments with five or more rooms. Of these apartments, a total of 105 apartments (95.5% of the total) were permanently occupied, while 2 apartments (1.8%) were seasonally occupied and 3 apartments (2.7%) were empty. As of 2009, the construction rate of new housing units was 7.5 new units per 1000 residents. The vacancy rate for the municipality, in 2010, was 2.52%.

The historical population is given in the following chart:

== Politics ==
In the 2007 federal election the most popular party was the SVP which received 27.5% of the vote. The next three most popular parties were the FDP (16.85%), the SP (16.55%) and the Green Party (14.38%). In the federal election, a total of 100 votes were cast, and the voter turnout was 52.4%.

== Economy ==
As of 2010, Dommartin had an unemployment rate of 4%. As of 2008, there were 21 people employed in the primary economic sector and about 7 businesses involved in this sector. 4 people were employed in the secondary sector and there were 2 businesses in this sector. 11 people were employed in the tertiary sector, with 6 businesses in this sector. There were 134 residents of the municipality who were employed in some capacity, of which females made up 46.3% of the workforce.

In 2008 the total number of full-time equivalent jobs was 28. The number of jobs in the primary sector was 16, all of which were in agriculture. The number of jobs in the secondary sector was 4 of which 1 was in manufacturing and 3 (75.0%) were in construction. The number of jobs in the tertiary sector was 8. In the tertiary sector; 2 or 25.0% were in the movement and storage of goods, 2 or 25.0% were technical professionals or scientists, 2 or 25.0% were in education and 1 was in health care.

In 2000, there were 5 workers who commuted into the municipality and 94 workers who commuted away. The municipality is a net exporter of workers, with about 18.8 workers leaving the municipality for every one entering. Of the working population, 1.5% used public transportation to get to work, and 72.4% used a private car.

== Religion ==
From the 2000 census, 55 or 22.8% were Roman Catholic, while 150 or 62.2% belonged to the Swiss Reformed Church. Of the rest of the population, there was 1 member of an Orthodox church, and there were 10 individuals (or about 4.15% of the population) who belonged to another Christian church. There were 2 (or about 0.83% of the population) who were Islamic. There were 2 individuals who belonged to another church. 26 (or about 10.79% of the population) belonged to no church, are agnostic or atheist.

== Education ==
In Dommartin about 89 or (36.9%) of the population have completed non-mandatory upper secondary education, and 34 or (14.1%) have completed additional higher education (either university or a Fachhochschule). Of the 34 who completed tertiary schooling, 52.9% were Swiss men, 26.5% were Swiss women.

In the 2009/2010 school year there were a total of 35 students in the Dommartin school district. In the Vaud cantonal school system, two years of non-obligatory pre-school are provided by the political districts. During the school year, the political district provided pre-school care for a total of 296 children of which 96 children (32.4%) received subsidized pre-school care. The canton's primary school program requires students to attend for four years. There were 23 students in the municipal primary school program. The obligatory lower secondary school program lasts for six years and there were 12 students in those schools.

As of 2000, there were 12 students in Dommartin who came from another municipality, while 36 residents attended schools outside the municipality.
