= Sugnens =

- Former municipality
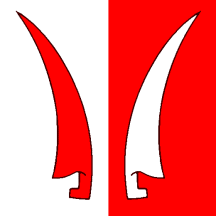
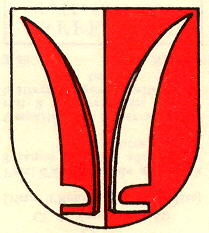
- Flag Coat of arms
- Location of Sugnens
- Location within Switzerland Location within Canton of Vaud
- Coordinates: 46°39′N 6°40′E
- Country: Switzerland
- Canton: Vaud
- District: Gros-de-Vaud

Area
  - Total: 2.69 km^{2} (1.04 sq mi)
- Elevation: 672 m (2,205 ft)

Population (December 2009)
  - Total: 309
  - Density: 115/km^{2} (298/sq mi)
- Time zone: UTC+01:00 (CET)
  - Summer (DST): UTC+02:00 (CEST)
- Postal code: 1043
- SFOS number: 5536
- ISO 3166 code: CH-VD
- Surrounded by: Fey, Naz, Poliez-le-Grand, Villars-le-Terroir
- Website: sugnens.ch

Sugnens is a village and former municipality in the district of Gros-de-Vaud in the canton of Vaud in Switzerland. Since 2011 it has been part of the municipality of Montilliez.

== History ==
Sugnens is first mentioned in 1177 as Sugnens.

The railway reached Sugnens in 1889, when the Compagnie du Central Vaudois opened their line from Échallens to Bercher. This became part of the Chemin de fer Lausanne-Échallens-Bercher in 1913.

The municipality of Sugnens was part of the district of Echallens until that district was dissolved on 31 August 2006, and Sugnens became part of the new district of Gros-de-Vaud. On 1 July 2011, the former municipalities of Dommartin, Naz, Poliez-le-Grand and Sugnens merged to form the new municipality of Montilliez.

== Geography ==
The village of Sugnens is located at an elevation of some 670 metres (2,200 ft) above sea level on the Gros-de-Vaud plateau, about 3 kilometres (1.9 mi) north-east of Échallens. Lausanne is some 15 kilometres (9.3 mi) to the south, and Yverdon-les-Bains is 14 kilometres (8.7 mi) to the north.

The former municipality of Sugnens consisted of the village of Sugnens and the hamlets of Monteilly and Pre Morex. In 2009, before its abolition, the municipality had an area of 2.69 square kilometres (1.04 sq mi). Of this area, 1.84 km^{2} (0.71 sq mi) or 68.4% were used for agricultural purposes, while 0.66 km^{2} (0.25 sq mi) or 24.5% were forested. Of the rest of the land, 0.18 km^{2} (0.069 sq mi) or 6.7% were settled (buildings or roads).

Of the built up area, housing and buildings made up 3.7% and transportation infrastructure made up 2.6%. Out of the forested land, 23.4% of the total land area was heavily forested and 1.1% was covered with orchards or small clusters of trees. Of the agricultural land, 50.2% was used for growing crops and 17.5% was pasture.

== Government ==
Sugnens is now governed as part of the municipality of Montilliez.

=== Politics ===
In the 2007 federal election, held prior to the abolition of the Sugnens municipality, the most popular party was the SVP which received 34.88% of the vote. The next three most popular parties were the FDP (18%), the Green Party (10.75%) and the SP (9.72%). In the federal election, a total of 112 votes were cast, and the voter turnout was 58.6%.

=== Coat of arms ===
The blazon of the former municipal coat of arms was Per pale Argent and Gules, two Scytheblades addorsed counterchanged.

== Demographics ==
In 2009, before its abolition, the municipality of Sugnens had a population of 309. As of 2008, 9.1% of the population are resident foreign nationals. Over the previous 10 years (1999–2009 ) the population has changed at a rate of 39.2%. It has changed at a rate of 32.4% due to migration and at a rate of 7.7% due to births and deaths.

Most of the population (as of 2000) spoke French (218 or 93.6%), with German being second most common (7 or 3.0%) and Italian being third (3 or 1.3%).

Of the population in the municipality 74 or about 31.8% were born in Sugnens and lived there in 2000. There were 101 or 43.3% who were born in the same canton, while 31 or 13.3% were born somewhere else in Switzerland, and 25 or 10.7% were born outside of Switzerland.

In 2008 there was 1 live birth to Swiss citizens and 1 birth to non-Swiss citizens, and in same time span there was 1 death of a Swiss citizen. Ignoring immigration and emigration, the population of Swiss citizens remained the same while the foreign population increased by 1. At the same time, there were 1 non-Swiss woman who immigrated from another country to Switzerland. The total Swiss population change in 2008 (from all sources, including moves across municipal borders) was an increase of 17 and the non-Swiss population increased by 9 people. This represents a population growth rate of 9.6%.

The age distribution, as of 2009, in Sugnens was; 52 children or 16.8% of the population were between 0 and 9 years old and 33 teenagers or 10.7% were between 10 and 19. Of the adult population, 23 people or 7.4% of the population were between 20 and 29 years old. 49 people or 15.9% were between 30 and 39, 54 people or 17.5% were between 40 and 49, and 40 people or 12.9% were between 50 and 59. The senior population distribution was 35 people or 11.3% of the population were between 60 and 69 years old, 15 people or 4.9% were between 70 and 79, there were 6 people or 1.9% who were between 80 and 89, and there were 2 people or 0.6% who were 90 and older.

As of 2000, there were 100 people who were single and never married in the municipality. There were 111 married individuals, 9 widows or widowers and 13 individuals who are divorced.

As of 2000 the average number of residents per living room was 0.57 which is about equal to the cantonal average of 0.61 per room. In this case, a room is defined as space of a housing unit of at least 4 m^{2} (43 sq ft) as normal bedrooms, dining rooms, living rooms, kitchens and habitable cellars and attics. About 62.2% of the total households were owner occupied, or in other words did not pay rent (though they may have a mortgage or a rent-to-own agreement).

As of 2000, there were 89 private households in the municipality, and an average of 2.6 persons per household. There were 20 households that consist of only one person and 7 households with five or more people. Out of a total of 93 households that answered this question, 21.5% were households made up of just one person. Of the rest of the households, there are 23 married couples without children, 34 married couples with children There were 9 single parents with a child or children. There were 3 households that were made up of unrelated people and 4 households that were made up of some sort of institution or another collective housing.

In 2000 there were 38 single family homes (or 54.3% of the total) out of a total of 70 inhabited buildings. There were 7 multi-family buildings (10.0%), along with 23 multi-purpose buildings that were mostly used for housing (32.9%) and 2 other use buildings (commercial or industrial) that also had some housing (2.9%). Of the single family homes 7 were built before 1919, while 14 were built between 1990 and 2000. The greatest number of multi-family homes (2) were built before 1919 and again between 1961 and 1970

In 2000 there were 92 apartments in the municipality. The most common apartment size was 5 rooms of which there were 21. There were 5 single room apartments and 43 apartments with five or more rooms. Of these apartments, a total of 82 apartments (89.1% of the total) were permanently occupied, while 6 apartments (6.5%) were seasonally occupied and 4 apartments (4.3%) were empty. As of 2009, the construction rate of new housing units was 16.2 new units per 1000 residents. The vacancy rate for the municipality, in 2010, was 0.83%.

The historical population is given in the following chart:

== Economy ==
As of 2010, Sugnens had an unemployment rate of 4%. As of 2008, there were 25 people employed in the primary economic sector and about 10 businesses involved in this sector. 16 people were employed in the secondary sector and there were 5 businesses in this sector. 11 people were employed in the tertiary sector, with 7 businesses in this sector. There were 128 residents of the municipality who were employed in some capacity, of which females made up 48.4% of the workforce.

In 2008 the total number of full-time equivalent jobs was 40. The number of jobs in the primary sector was 16, all of which were in agriculture. The number of jobs in the secondary sector was 15 of which 3 or (20.0%) were in manufacturing and 13 (86.7%) were in construction. The number of jobs in the tertiary sector was 9. In the tertiary sector; 2 or 22.2% were in the sale or repair of motor vehicles, 3 or 33.3% were in a hotel or restaurant, 1 was the insurance or financial industry, 2 or 22.2% were in education.

In 2000, there were 11 workers who commuted into the municipality and 93 workers who commuted away. The municipality is a net exporter of workers, with about 8.5 workers leaving the municipality for every one entering. Of the working population, 14.8% used public transportation to get to work, and 60.2% used a private car.

== Transport ==
Sugnens railway station, on the suburban Lausanne-Échallens-Bercher line, is adjacent to the village and was in the former municipality. There is a half-hourly interval service betweeb Sugnens and Lausanne (via Échallens) in one direction, and between Sugnens and Bercher in the other direction. The village is also served by PostBus service 428, which links it to Chavornay, Echallens, and Thierrens.

== Religion ==
From the 2000 census, 47 or 20.2% were Roman Catholic, while 159 or 68.2% belonged to the Swiss Reformed Church. Of the rest of the population, there were 2 members of an Orthodox church (or about 0.86% of the population), and there was 1 individual who belongs to another Christian church. There was 1 individual who was Islamic. 18 (or about 7.73% of the population) belonged to no church, are agnostic or atheist, and 5 individuals (or about 2.15% of the population) did not answer the question.

== Education ==
In Sugnens about 90 or (38.6%) of the population have completed non-mandatory upper secondary education, and 40 or (17.2%) have completed additional higher education (either University or a Fachhochschule). Of the 40 who completed tertiary schooling, 60.0% were Swiss men, 32.5% were Swiss women.

In the 2009/2010 school year there were a total of 44 students in the Sugnens school district. In the Vaud cantonal school system, two years of non-obligatory pre-school are provided by the political districts. During the school year, the political district provided pre-school care for a total of 296 children of which 96 children (32.4%) received subsidized pre-school care. The canton's primary school program requires students to attend for four years. There were 28 students in the municipal primary school program. The obligatory lower secondary school program lasts for six years and there were 15 students in those schools. There were also 1 students who were home schooled or attended another non-traditional school.

As of 2000, there were 10 students in Sugnens who came from another municipality, while 26 residents attended schools outside the municipality.
