= Poliez-Pittet =

Municipality in Switzerland

- Municipality
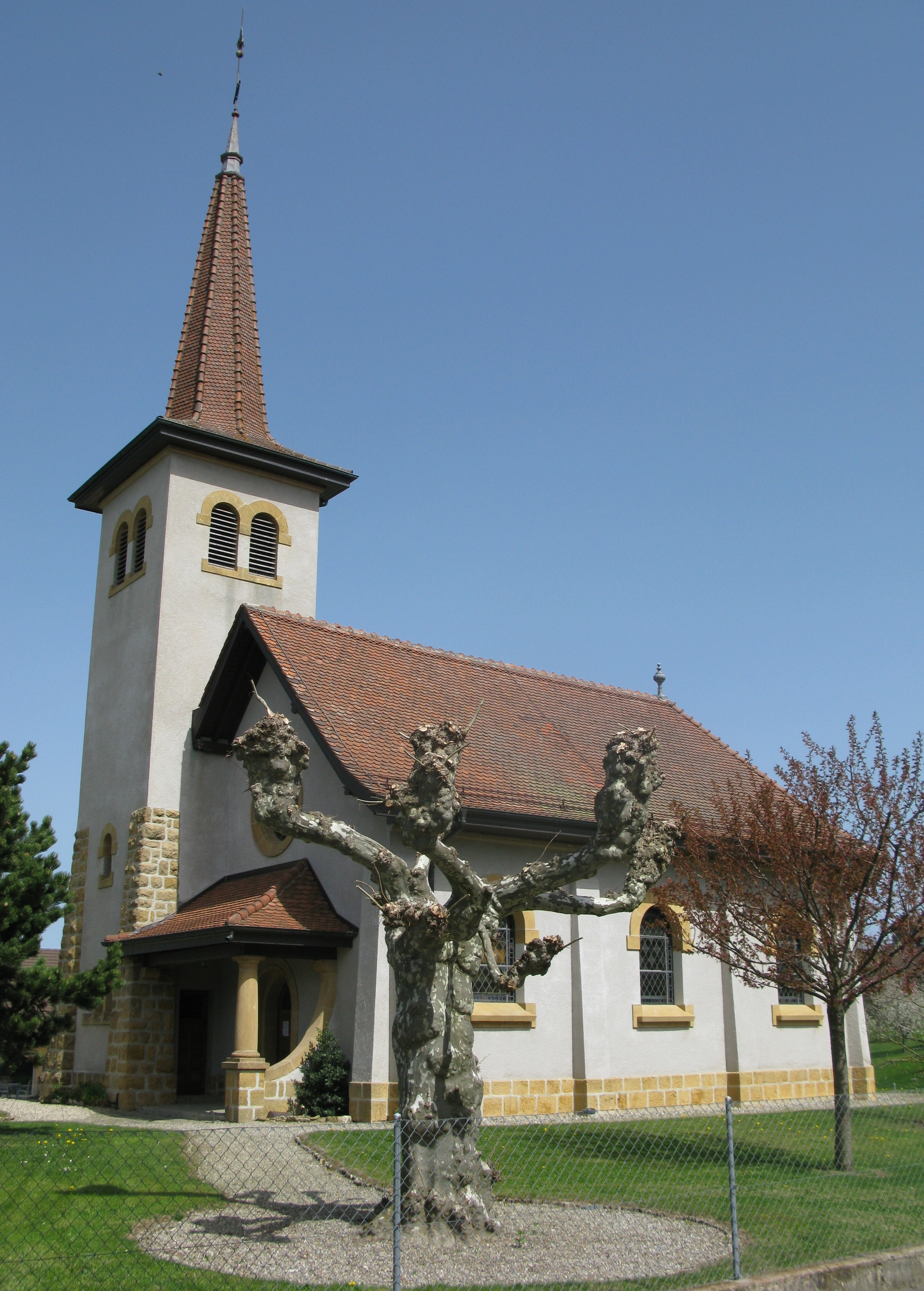
- Poliez-Pittet village church

- Flag Coat of arms
- Location of Poliez-Pittet
- Location within Switzerland Location within Canton of Vaud
- Coordinates: 46°38′N 6°41′E
- Country: Switzerland
- Canton: Vaud
- District: Gros-de-Vaud

Government
  - Mayor: Syndic

Area
  - Total: 5.01 km^{2} (1.93 sq mi)
- Elevation: 743 m (2,438 ft)

Population (December 2005)
  - Total: 650
  - Density: 130/km^{2} (340/sq mi)
- Time zone: UTC+01:00 (CET)
  - Summer (DST): UTC+02:00 (CEST)
- Postal code: 1041
- SFOS number: 5533
- ISO 3166 code: CH-VD
- Surrounded by: Bottens, Dommartin, Froideville, Poliez-le-Grand, Villars-Tiercelin
- Website: http://www.poliez-pittet.ch Profile (in French), SFSO statistics

Poliez-Pittet is a municipality in the district of Gros-de-Vaud in the canton of Vaud in Switzerland.

== History ==
Poliez-Pittet is first mentioned around 1160-79 as Poleto. In 1230 it was mentioned as Pollie lo Pitet.

== Geography ==
Poliez-Pittet has an area, as of 2009, of 5.01 square kilometers (1.93 sq mi). Of this area, 2.75 km^{2} (1.06 sq mi) or 54.9% is used for agricultural purposes, while 1.79 km^{2} (0.69 sq mi) or 35.7% is forested. Of the rest of the land, 0.47 km^{2} (0.18 sq mi) or 9.4% is settled (buildings or roads).

Of the built up area, housing and buildings made up 5.0% and transportation infrastructure made up 3.4%. Out of the forested land, all of the forested land area is covered with heavy forests. Of the agricultural land, 41.9% is used for growing crops and 12.6% is pastures.

The municipality was part of the Echallens District until it was dissolved on 31 August 2006, and Poliez-Pittet became part of the new district of Gros-de-Vaud.

The municipality is located on the left bank of the Mentue river.

== Coat of arms ==
The blazon of the municipal coat of arms is Gules, a Roman Soldier's Head Argent, helmeted Or; chief Argent. The name Poliez is derived from Polliacus, the name of a local land owner in the Roman era.

== Demographics ==
Poliez-Pittet has a population (as of December 2020) of 830. As of 2008, 6.2% of the population are resident foreign nationals. Over the last 10 years (1999–2009 ) the population has changed at a rate of 25%. It has changed at a rate of 15% due to migration and at a rate of 10.5% due to births and deaths.

Most of the population (as of 2000) speaks French (517 or 95.2%), with German being second most common (10 or 1.8%) and Portuguese being third (6 or 1.1%). There are 3 people who speak Italian.

Of the population in the municipality 198 or about 36.5% were born in Poliez-Pittet and lived there in 2000. There were 224 or 41.3% who were born in the same canton, while 57 or 10.5% were born somewhere else in Switzerland, and 54 or 9.9% were born outside of Switzerland.

In 2008, there were 6 live births to Swiss citizens and 1 birth to non-Swiss citizens, and in same time span there were 4 deaths of Swiss citizens and 1 non-Swiss citizen death. Ignoring immigration and emigration, the population of Swiss citizens increased by 2 while the foreign population remained the same. At the same time, there were 2 non-Swiss men who immigrated from another country to Switzerland. The total Swiss population change in 2008 (from all sources, including moves across municipal borders) was an increase of 37 and the non-Swiss population decreased by 6 people. This represents a population growth rate of 4.9%.

The age distribution, as of 2009, in Poliez-Pittet is; 74 children or 11.1% of the population are between 0 and 9 years old and 94 teenagers or 14.1% are between 10 and 19. Of the adult population, 72 people or 10.8% of the population are between 20 and 29 years old. 98 people or 14.7% are between 30 and 39, 128 people or 19.2% are between 40 and 49, and 73 people or 11.0% are between 50 and 59. The senior population distribution is 71 people or 10.7% of the population are between 60 and 69 years old, 39 people or 5.9% are between 70 and 79, there are 13 people or 2.0% who are between 80 and 89, and there are 3 people or 0.5% who are 90 and older.

As of 2000, there were 223 people who were single and never married in the municipality. There were 283 married individuals, 16 widows or widowers and 21 individuals who are divorced.

As of 2000, there were 212 private households in the municipality, and an average of 2.5 persons per household. There were 48 households that consist of only one person and 9 households with five or more people. Out of a total of 215 households that answered this question, 22.3% were households made up of just one person. Of the rest of the households, there are 56 married couples without children, 84 married couples with children There were 19 single parents with a child or children. There were 5 households that were made up of unrelated people and 3 households that were made up of some sort of institution or another collective housing.

In 2000, there were 52 single family homes (or 44.8% of the total) out of a total of 116 inhabited buildings. There were 32 multi-family buildings (27.6%), along with 26 multi-purpose buildings that were mostly used for housing (22.4%) and 6 other use buildings (commercial or industrial) that also had some housing (5.2%). Of the single family homes 12 were built before 1919, while 8 were built between 1990 and 2000. The greatest number of single family homes (18) were built between 1971 and 1980. The most multi-family homes (10) were built before 1919 and the next most (8) were built between 1961 and 1970.

In 2000, there were 223 apartments in the municipality. The most common apartment size was 4 rooms of which there were 73. There were 4 single room apartments and 69 apartments with five or more rooms. Of these apartments, a total of 204 apartments (91.5% of the total) were permanently occupied, while 13 apartments (5.8%) were seasonally occupied and 6 apartments (2.7%) were empty. As of 2009, the construction rate of new housing units was 1.5 new units per 1000 residents. The vacancy rate for the municipality, in 2010, was 0%.

The historical population is given in the following chart:

== Politics ==
In the 2007 federal election the most popular party was the SVP which received 32.96% of the vote. The next three most popular parties were the CVP (21.06%), the SP (14.59%) and the FDP (12.05%). In the federal election, a total of 201 votes were cast, and the voter turnout was 45.8%.

== Economy ==
As of 2010, Poliez-Pittet had an unemployment rate of 3.5%. As of 2008, there were 40 people employed in the primary economic sector and about 17 businesses involved in this sector. 44 people were employed in the secondary sector and there were 9 businesses in this sector. 54 people were employed in the tertiary sector, with 10 businesses in this sector. There were 306 residents of the municipality who were employed in some capacity, of which females made up 41.5% of the workforce.

In 2008, the total number of full-time equivalent jobs was 107. The number of jobs in the primary sector was 25, all of which were in agriculture. The number of jobs in the secondary sector was 38 of which 8 or (21.1%) were in manufacturing and 31 (81.6%) were in construction. The number of jobs in the tertiary sector was 44. In the tertiary sector; 22 or 50.0% were in wholesale or retail sales or the repair of motor vehicles, 12 or 27.3% were in a hotel or restaurant, 3 or 6.8% were in education.

In 2000, there were 37 workers who commuted into the municipality and 237 workers who commuted away. The municipality is a net exporter of workers, with about 6.4 workers leaving the municipality for every one entering. Of the working population, 7.2% used public transportation to get to work, and 74.2% used a private car.

== Religion ==
From the 2000 census, 251 or 46.2% were Roman Catholic, while 209 or 38.5% belonged to the Swiss Reformed Church. Of the rest of the population, there were 5 members of an Orthodox church (or about 0.92% of the population), and there were 12 individuals (or about 2.21% of the population) who belonged to another Christian church. 46 (or about 8.47% of the population) belonged to no church, are agnostic or atheist, and 26 individuals (or about 4.79% of the population) did not answer the question.

== Education ==
In Poliez-Pittet about 213 or (39.2%) of the population have completed non-mandatory upper secondary education, and 63 or (11.6%) have completed additional higher education (either university or a Fachhochschule). Of the 63 who completed tertiary schooling, 66.7% were Swiss men, 20.6% were Swiss women and 9.5% were non-Swiss women.

In the 2009/2010 school year there were a total of 100 students in the Poliez-Pittet school district. In the Vaud cantonal school system, two years of non-obligatory pre-school are provided by the political districts. During the school year, the political district provided pre-school care for a total of 296 children of which 96 children (32.4%) received subsidized pre-school care. The canton's primary school program requires students to attend for four years. There were 47 students in the municipal primary school program. The obligatory lower secondary school program lasts for six years and there were 52 students in those schools. There were also 1 students who were home schooled or attended another non-traditional school.

As of 2000, there were 183 students in Poliez-Pittet who came from another municipality, while 45 residents attended schools outside the municipality.
