= Sugnens railway station =

Railway station in Montilliez, Vaud, Switzerland

Sugnens
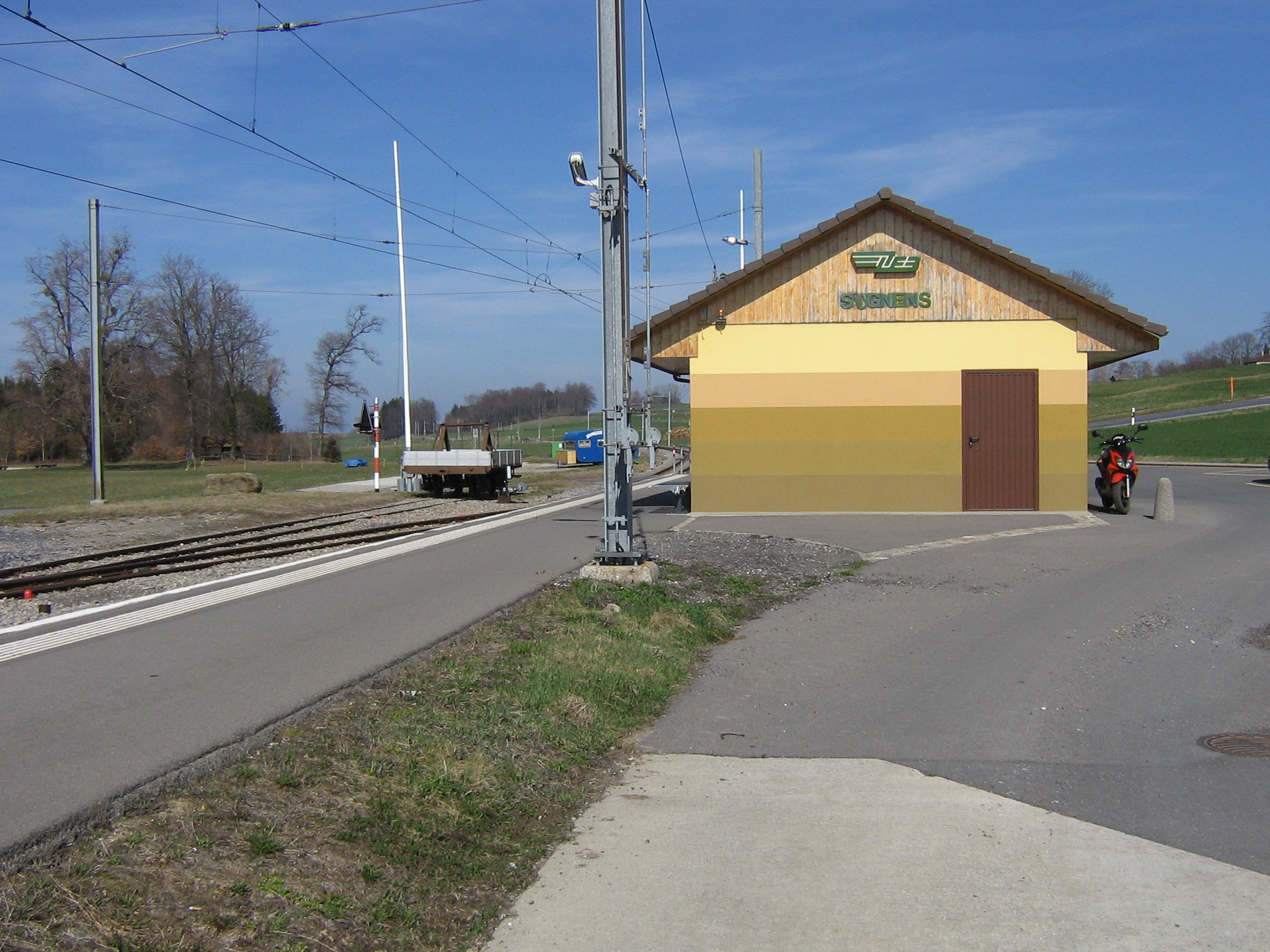
- The station in 2011

General information
- Location: Montilliez, Vaud; Switzerland
- Coordinates: 46°39′18″N 6°39′57″E
- Elevation: 648 m (2,126 ft)
- Owner: Chemin de fer Lausanne-Échallens-Bercher
- Line: Lausanne–Bercher line
- Distance: 18.3 km (11.4 mi) from Lausanne-Flon
- Platforms: 2 side platforms
- Tracks: 2
- Train operators: Chemin de fer Lausanne-Échallens-Bercher

Construction
- Accessible: Yes

Other information
- Station code: 8501175 (SUGN)
- Fare zone: 51 (mobilis)

History
- Opened: 1889
- Electrified: 7 December 1935

Services
Preceding station	LEB	Following station
Fey towards Bercher	R20	Grésaley towards Lausanne-Flon
Location

Sugnens railway station (French: Gare de Sugnens) is a Swiss railway station, situated adjacent to the village of Sugnens, in the municipality of Montilliez and canton of Vaud. It is located on the 1,000 mm (3 ft 3 3/8 in) Lausanne–Bercher line of the Chemin de fer Lausanne-Échallens-Bercher (LEB).

Sugnens station opened to service in 1889, as an intermediate station on the Compagnie du Central Vaudois line between Échallens and Bercher stations. Although the Central Vaudois was nominally an independent company, its line was operated by the Lausanne-Échallens line, with which it connected at Échallens. The two lines merged as the LEB in 1913, and were electrified in 1935.

== Services ==
As of the December 2023 timetable change, the following services stop at Sugnens:

- Regio: half-hourly service between Lausanne-Flon and Bercher.
