= Échallens District =

District of Vaud, Switzerland

Coordinates: 46°38′N 6°38′E

Cossonay District District d'Échallens
- District
- Flag Coat of arms

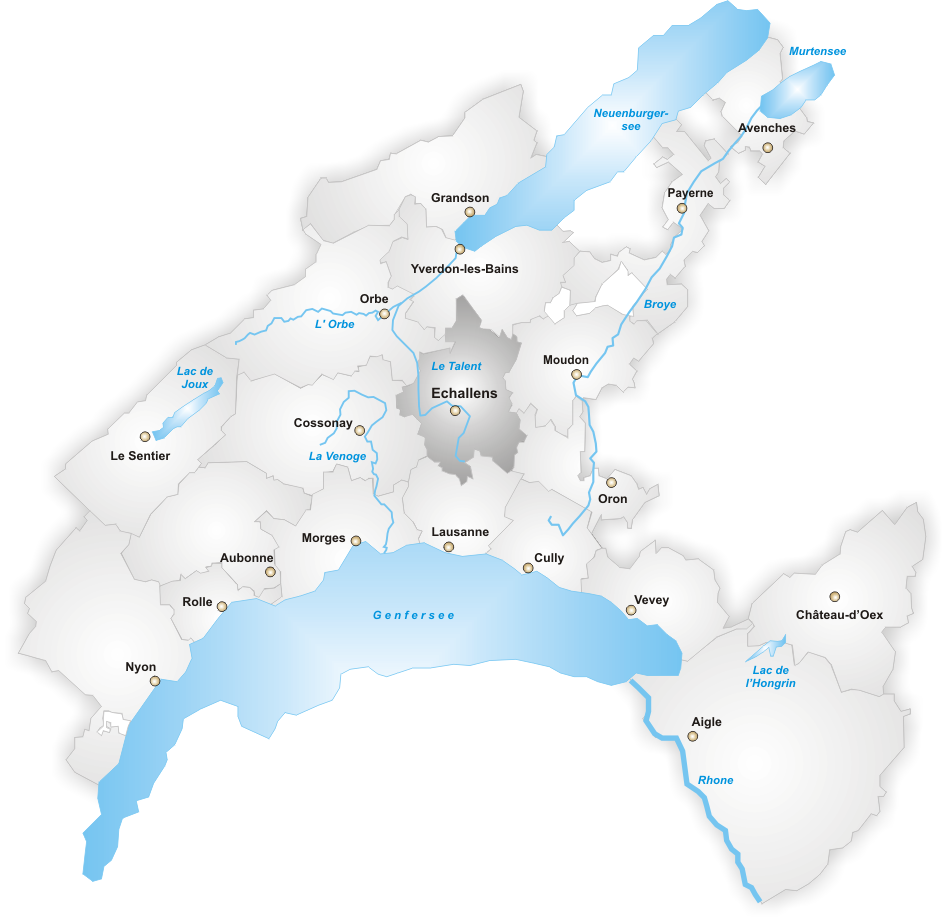
- Country: Switzerland
- Canton: Vaud
- Capital: Échallens

Area
  - Total: 136.67 km^{2} (52.77 sq mi)

Population (2006)
  - Total: 21,763
  - Density: 159.24/km^{2} (412.42/sq mi)
- Time zone: UTC+1 (CET)
  - Summer (DST): UTC+2 (CEST)
- Municipalities: 29

Échallens District was a district of the Canton of Vaud, Switzerland. The seat of the district was the town of Échallens.

The district was dissolved on 31 August 2006 and all the municipalities transferred to the new Gros-de-Vaud District on the following day.

The following municipalities were located within the district:

- Assens
- Bercher
- Bioley-Orjulaz
- Bottens
- Bretigny-sur-Morrens
- Cugy
- Dommartin
- Échallens
- Éclagnens
- Essertines-sur-Yverdon
- Étagnières
- Fey
- Froideville
- Goumoens-la-Ville
- Goumoens-le-Jux
- Malapalud
- Morrens
- Naz
- Oulens-sous-Échallens
- Pailly
- Penthéréaz
- Poliez-le-Grand
- Poliez-Pittet
- Rueyres
- Saint-Barthélemy
- Sugnens
- Villars-le-Terroir
- Villars-Tiercelin
- Vuarrens
