= Fey railway station =

Railway station in Fey, Vaud, Switzerland

Fey
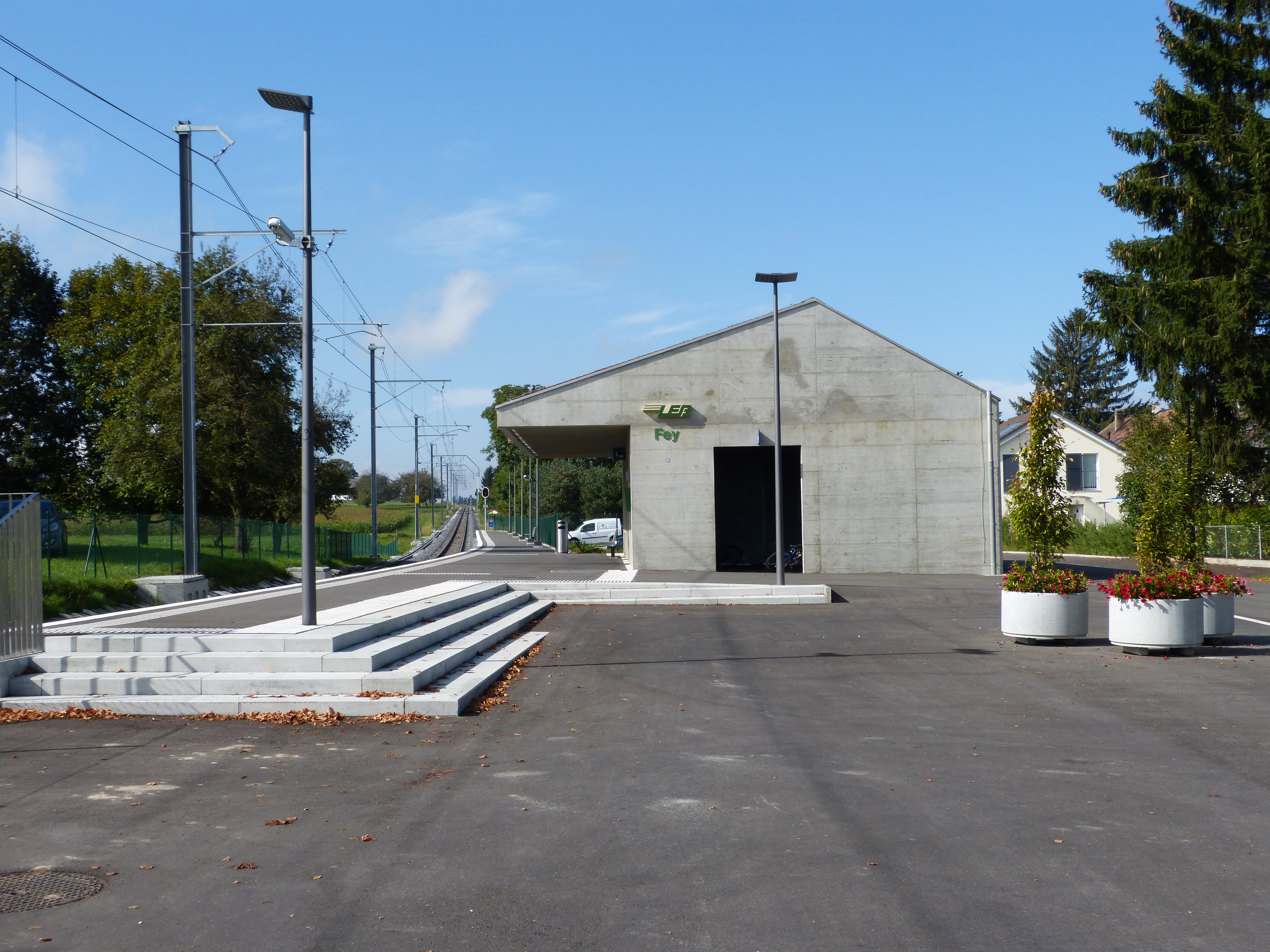
- The station in 2014

General information
- Location: Fey, Vaud; Switzerland
- Coordinates: 46°40′28″N 6°41′06″E
- Elevation: 647 m (2,123 ft)
- Owner: Chemin de fer Lausanne-Échallens-Bercher
- Line: Lausanne–Bercher line
- Distance: 21.1 km (13.1 mi) from Lausanne-Flon
- Platforms: 1 side platform
- Tracks: 1
- Train operators: Chemin de fer Lausanne-Échallens-Bercher

Construction
- Accessible: Yes

Other information
- Station code: 8501176 (FEY)
- Fare zone: 51 and 52 (mobilis)

History
- Opened: 1889
- Electrified: 7 December 1935

Services
| Preceding station | LEB | Following station |
|---|---|---|
| Bercher Terminus | R20 | Sugnens towards Lausanne-Flon |
Location

Fey railway station (French: Halte de Fey) is a railway station in the municipality of Fey, in the Swiss canton of Vaud. It is located on the 1,000 mm (3 ft 3 3/8 in) Lausanne–Bercher line of the Chemin de fer Lausanne-Échallens-Bercher (LEB). The station has a single track and platform.

Fey station opened to service in 1889, as an intermediate station on the Compagnie du Central Vaudois line between Échallens and Bercher stations. Although the Central Vaudois was nominally an independent company, its line was operated by the Lausanne-Échallens line, with which it connected at Échallens. The two lines merged as the LEB in 1913, and were electrified in 1935.

== Services ==
As of the December 2023 timetable change, the following services stop at Fey:

- Regio: half-hourly service between Lausanne-Flon and Bercher.

== Gallery ==
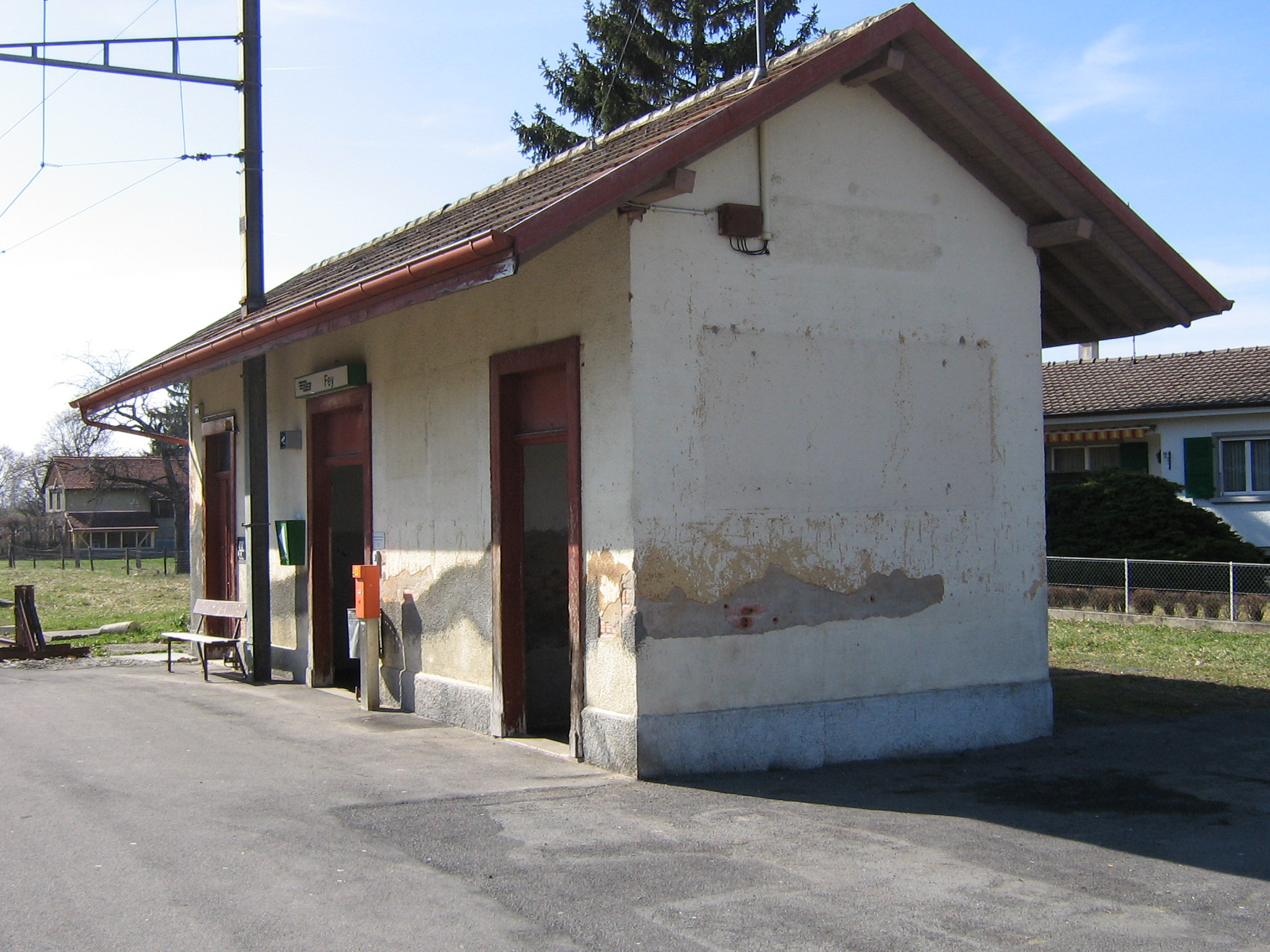
Station building in 2011 before rebuild

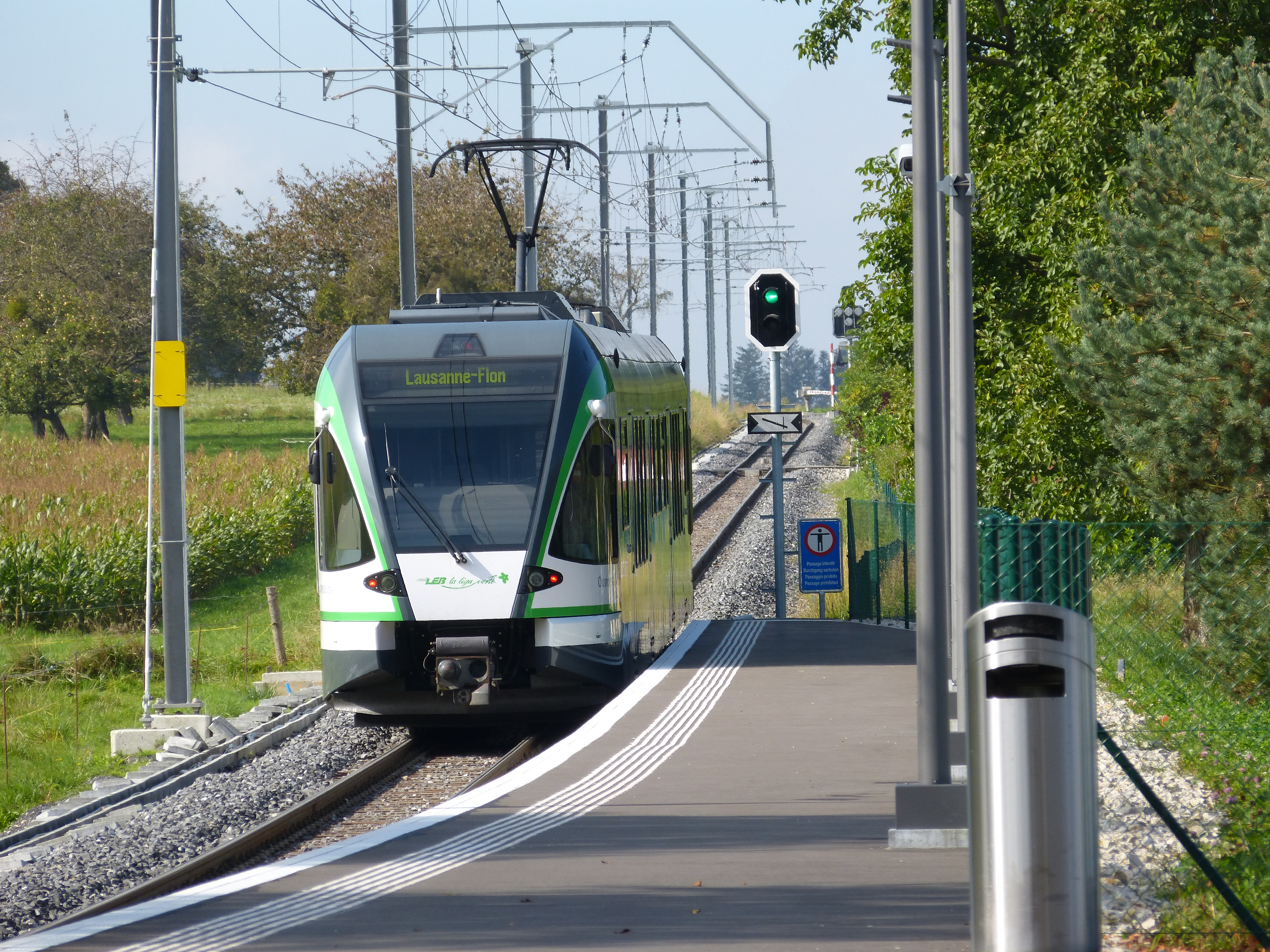
Train leaving the station towards Lausanne

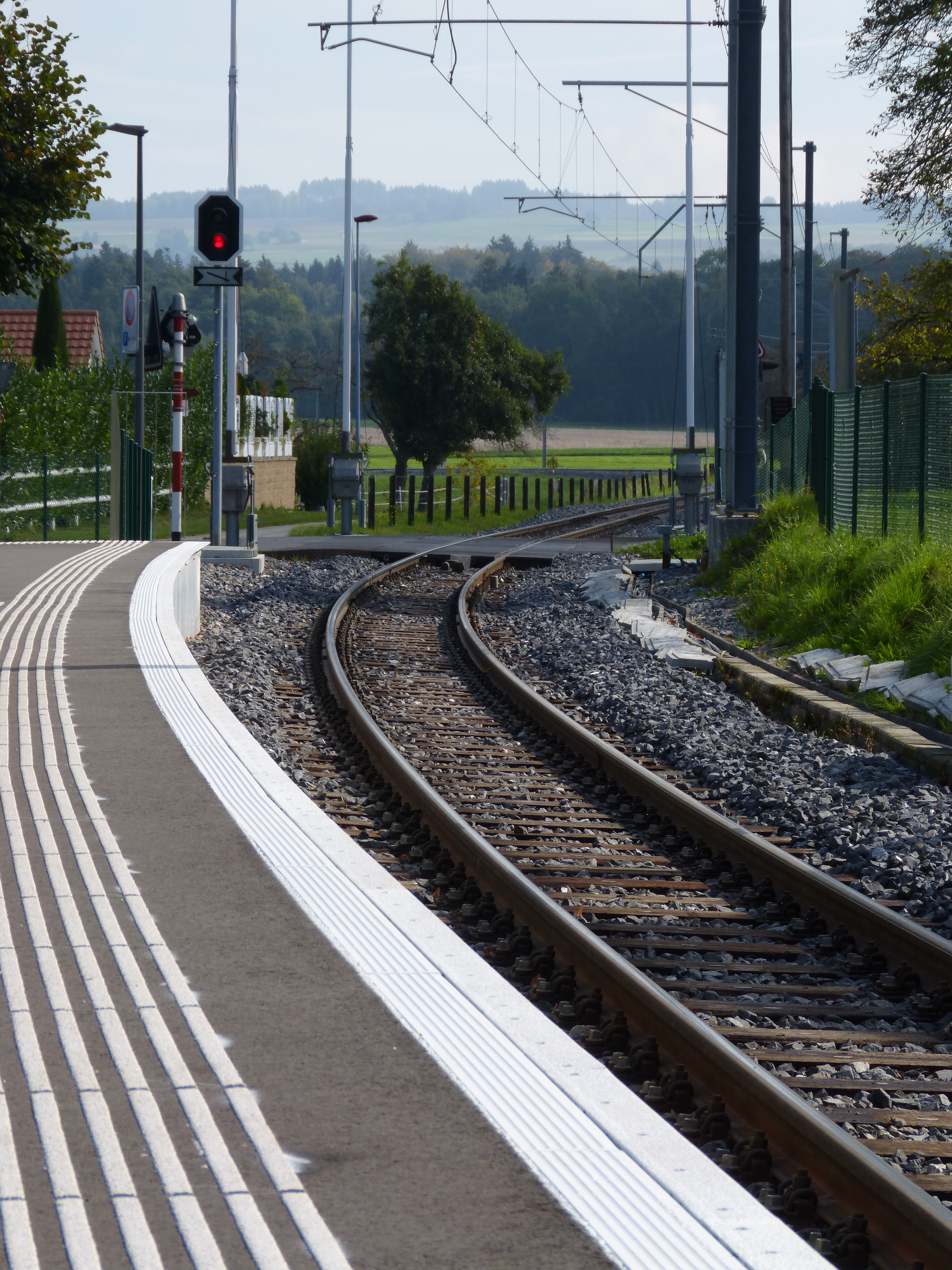
Plalform looking towards Bercher
