= Fey, Vaud =

Fey
- Municipality
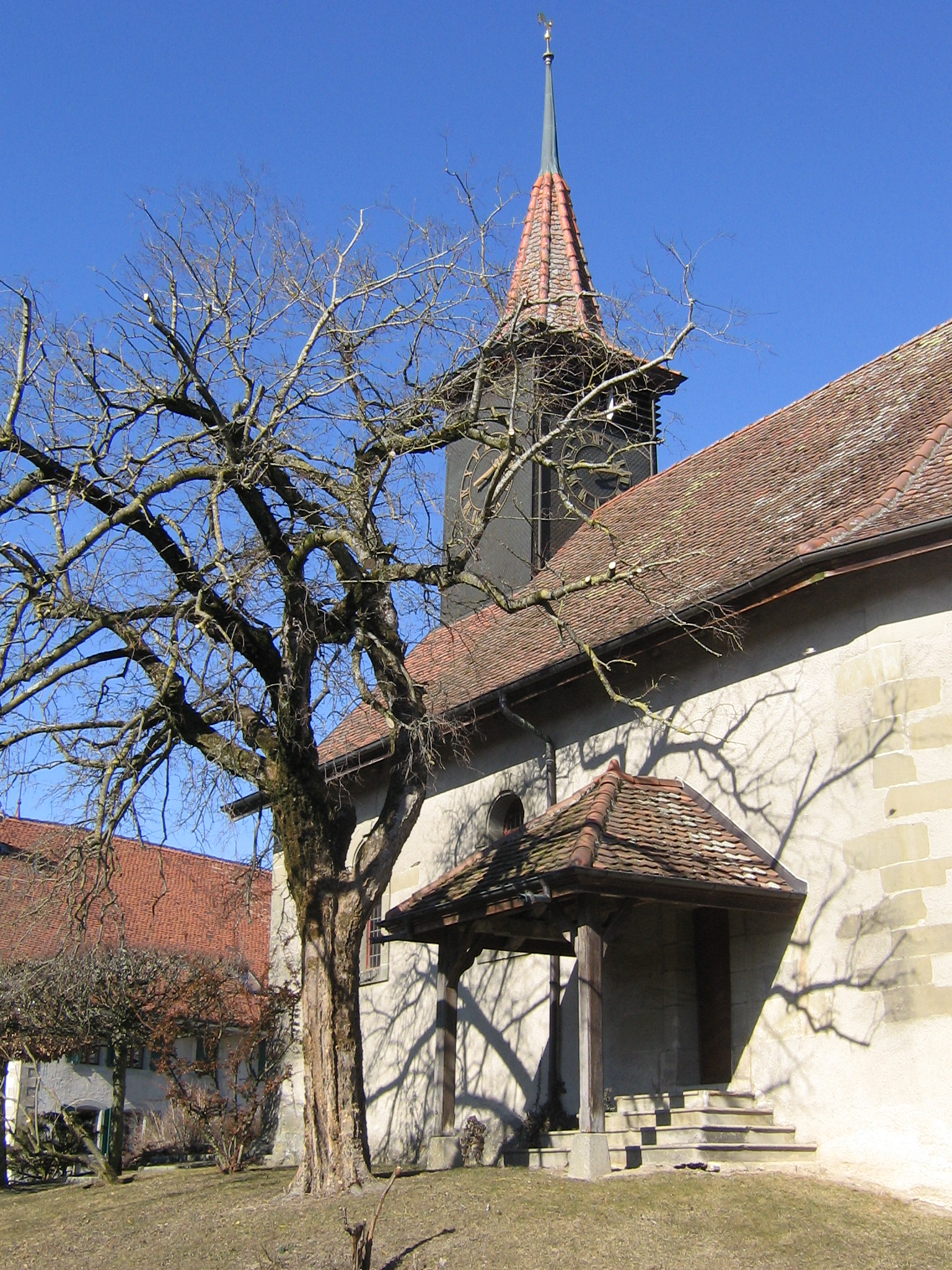

- Flag Coat of arms
- Location of Fey
- Location within Switzerland Location within Canton of Vaud
- Coordinates: 46°40′31.54″N 6°40′55.34″E
- Country: Switzerland
- Canton: Vaud
- District: Gros-de-Vaud

Government
  - Mayor: Syndic

Area
  - Total: 7.35 km^{2} (2.84 sq mi)
- Elevation: 638 m (2,093 ft)

Population (December 2004)
  - Total: 449
  - Density: 61.1/km^{2} (158/sq mi)
- Time zone: UTC+01:00 (CET)
  - Summer (DST): UTC+02:00 (CEST)
- Postal code: 1044
- SFOS number: 5522
- ISO 3166 code: CH-VD
- Surrounded by: Bercher, Boulens, Naz, Pailly, Peyres-Possens, Rueyres, Sugnens, Villars-le-Terroir, Vuarrens
- Website: http://www.fey-vd.ch Profile (in French), SFSO statistics

Fey is a village and municipality in the district of Gros-de-Vaud in the canton of Vaud in Switzerland.

== History ==
Fey is first mentioned in 1228 as Fei. It has had a parish church since that year; the church was rebuilt in 1702.

The railway reached Fey in 1889, when the Compagnie du Central Vaudois opened their line from Échallens to Bercher. This became part of the Chemin de fer Lausanne-Échallens-Bercher in 1913.

Fey was part of the district of Échallens until that district was dissolved on 31 August 2006, when it became part of the new district of Gros-de-Vaud.

== Geography ==
Fey is located on the Gros-de-Vaud plateau, about 5 kilometres (3.1 mi) north-east of Échallens and 3 kilometres (1.9 mi) south-west of Bercher. Lausanne is some 18 kilometres (11 mi) to the south, and Yverdon-les-Bains is 11 kilometres (6.8 mi) to the north.

The municipality has an area, as of 2009, of 7.35 square kilometers (2.84 sq mi). Of this area, 5.03 km^{2} (1.94 sq mi) or 68.4% is used for agricultural purposes, while 1.94 km^{2} (0.75 sq mi) or 26.4% is forested. Of the rest of the land, 0.42 km^{2} (0.16 sq mi) or 5.7% is settled (buildings or roads) and 0.01 km^{2} (2.5 acres) or 0.1% is unproductive land.

Of the built up area, housing and buildings made up 2.4% and transportation infrastructure made up 2.9%. Out of the forested land, all of the forested land area is covered with heavy forests. Of the agricultural land, 52.0% is used for growing crops and 15.5% is pastures.

== Government ==
=== Politics ===
In the 2007 federal election the most popular party was the SVP which received 28.29% of the vote. The next three most popular parties were the SP (21.86%), the Green Party (17.07%) and the FDP (12.88%). In the federal election, a total of 138 votes were cast, and the voter turnout was 40.4%.

=== Coat of arms ===
The blazon of the municipal coat of arms is Argent, a Beech Tree eradicated Vert.

== Demographics ==
Fey has a population (as of December 2020) of 749. As of 2008, 11.9% of the population are resident foreign nationals. Over the last 10 years (1999–2009 ) the population has changed at a rate of 28.7%. It has changed at a rate of 26.3% due to migration and at a rate of 2.8% due to births and deaths.

Most of the population (as of 2000) speaks French (402 or 95.3%), with German being second most common (6 or 1.4%) and Portuguese being third (6 or 1.4%). There is 1 person who speaks Italian.

Of the population in the municipality 138 or about 32.7% were born in Fey and lived there in 2000. There were 179 or 42.4% who were born in the same canton, while 61 or 14.5% were born somewhere else in Switzerland, and 41 or 9.7% were born outside of Switzerland.

In 2008 there were 2 live births to Swiss citizens and were 4 deaths of Swiss citizens. Ignoring immigration and emigration, the population of Swiss citizens decreased by 2 while the foreign population remained the same. There was 1 Swiss woman who emigrated from Switzerland. At the same time, there were 2 non-Swiss men who immigrated from another country to Switzerland and 1 non-Swiss woman who emigrated from Switzerland to another country. The total Swiss population change in 2008 (from all sources, including moves across municipal borders) was an increase of 28 and the non-Swiss population increased by 14 people. This represents a population growth rate of 8.4%.

The age distribution, as of 2009, in Fey is; 71 children or 12.9% of the population are between 0 and 9 years old and 72 teenagers or 13.0% are between 10 and 19. Of the adult population, 50 people or 9.1% of the population are between 20 and 29 years old. 84 people or 15.2% are between 30 and 39, 107 people or 19.4% are between 40 and 49, and 60 people or 10.9% are between 50 and 59. The senior population distribution is 53 people or 9.6% of the population are between 60 and 69 years old, 33 people or 6.0% are between 70 and 79, there are 16 people or 2.9% who are between 80 and 89, and there are 6 people or 1.1% who are 90 and older.

As of 2000, there were 170 people who were single and never married in the municipality. There were 199 married individuals, 34 widows or widowers and 19 individuals who are divorced.

As of 2000, there were 178 private households in the municipality, and an average of 2.3 persons per household. There were 55 households that consist of only one person and 10 households with five or more people. Out of a total of 181 households that answered this question, 30.4% were households made up of just one person and there was 1 adult who lived with their parents. Of the rest of the households, there are 44 married couples without children, 65 married couples with children There were 10 single parents with a child or children. There were 3 households that were made up of unrelated people and 3 households that were made up of some sort of institution or another collective housing.

In 2000 there were 52 single family homes (or 43.7% of the total) out of a total of 119 inhabited buildings. There were 33 multi-family buildings (27.7%), along with 23 multi-purpose buildings that were mostly used for housing (19.3%) and 11 other use buildings (commercial or industrial) that also had some housing (9.2%). Of the single family homes 22 were built before 1919, while 6 were built between 1990 and 2000. The most multi-family homes (19) were built before 1919 and the next most (4) were built between 1919 and 1945. There was 1 multi-family house built between 1996 and 2000.

In 2000 there were 196 apartments in the municipality. The most common apartment size was 4 rooms of which there were 50. There were 6 single room apartments and 70 apartments with five or more rooms. Of these apartments, a total of 172 apartments (87.8% of the total) were permanently occupied, while 16 apartments (8.2%) were seasonally occupied and 8 apartments (4.1%) were empty. As of 2009, the construction rate of new housing units was 0 new units per 1000 residents. The vacancy rate for the municipality, in 2010, was 0%.

The historical population is given in the following chart:

== Economy ==
As of 2010, Fey had an unemployment rate of 5%. As of 2008, there were 38 people employed in the primary economic sector and about 15 businesses involved in this sector. 49 people were employed in the secondary sector and there were 6 businesses in this sector. 31 people were employed in the tertiary sector, with 10 businesses in this sector. There were 210 residents of the municipality who were employed in some capacity, of which females made up 33.8% of the workforce.

In 2008 the total number of full-time equivalent jobs was 99. The number of jobs in the primary sector was 29, all of which were in agriculture. The number of jobs in the secondary sector was 47 of which 4 or (8.5%) were in manufacturing and 43 (91.5%) were in construction. The number of jobs in the tertiary sector was 23. In the tertiary sector; 11 or 47.8% were in wholesale or retail sales or the repair of motor vehicles, 2 or 8.7% were in a hotel or restaurant, 3 or 13.0% were in education and 1 was in health care.

In 2000, there were 31 workers who commuted into the municipality and 156 workers who commuted away. The municipality is a net exporter of workers, with about 5.0 workers leaving the municipality for every one entering. Of the working population, 9% used public transportation to get to work, and 67.1% used a private car.

== Transport ==
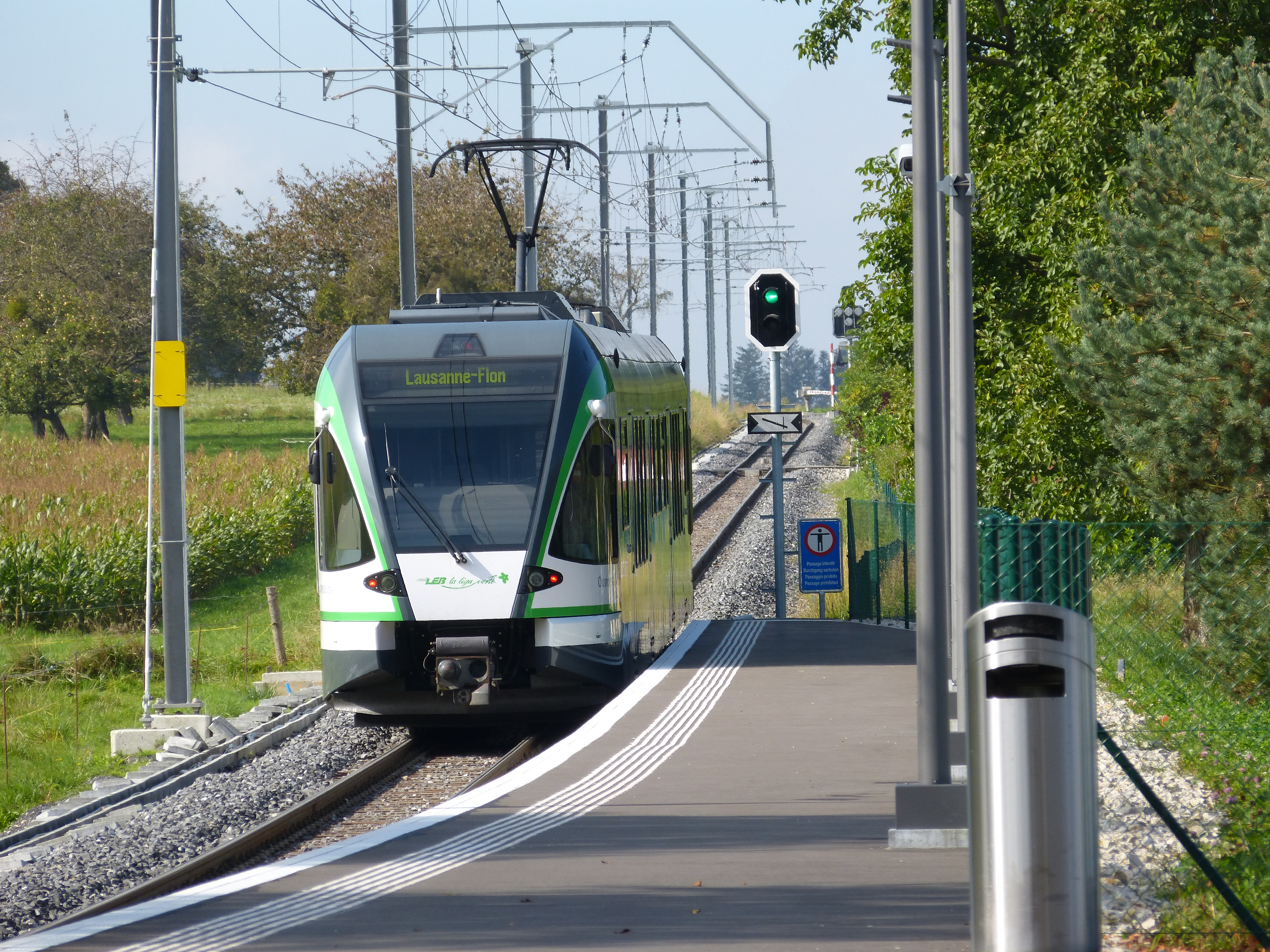
A train of the Lausanne-Échallens-Bercher line at Fey station

=== Railway ===
The municipality has a railway station, Fey, on the suburban Lausanne-Échallens-Bercher line. There is a half-hourly interval service betweeb Fey and Lausanne (via Échallens) in one direction, and between Fey and Bercher in the other direction.

=== Road ===
Fey lies at the intersection of a secondary road between Échallens and Bercher, and another between Vuarrens and Peyres-Possens.

== Religion ==
From the 2000 census, 86 or 20.4% were Roman Catholic, while 268 or 63.5% belonged to the Swiss Reformed Church. Of the rest of the population, there was 1 member of an Orthodox church, and there were 26 individuals (or about 6.16% of the population) who belonged to another Christian church. There was 1 individual who was Islamic. 45 (or about 10.66% of the population) belonged to no church, are agnostic or atheist, and 8 individuals (or about 1.90% of the population) did not answer the question.

== Education ==
In Fey about 169 or (40.0%) of the population have completed non-mandatory upper secondary education, and 40 or (9.5%) have completed additional higher education (either university or a Fachhochschule). Of the 40 who completed tertiary schooling, 57.5% were Swiss men, 37.5% were Swiss women.

In the 2009/2010 school year there were a total of 85 students in the Fey school district. In the Vaud cantonal school system, two years of non-obligatory pre-school are provided by the political districts. During the school year, the political district provided pre-school care for a total of 296 children of which 96 children (32.4%) received subsidized pre-school care. The canton's primary school program requires students to attend for four years. There were 52 students in the municipal primary school program. The obligatory lower secondary school program lasts for six years and there were 33 students in those schools.

As of 2000, there were 32 students in Fey who came from another municipality, while 58 residents attended schools outside the municipality.

== Weather ==
Climate in this area has mild differences between highs and lows, and there is adequate rainfall year-round. The Köppen Climate Classification subtype for this climate is "Cfb". (Marine West Coast Climate/Oceanic climate).

Climate data for Fey, Switzerland (1961–1990)
Month	Jan	Feb	Mar	Apr	May	Jun	Jul	Aug	Sep	Oct	Nov	Dec	Year
Mean daily maximum °C (°F)	2.6 (36.7)	5.2 (41.4)	9.3 (48.7)	13.7 (56.7)	18.0 (64.4)	21.3 (70.3)	23.6 (74.5)	22.6 (72.7)	19.5 (67.1)	14.5 (58.1)	7.5 (45.5)	3.5 (38.3)	13.4 (56.1)
Daily mean °C (°F)	0.0 (32.0)	1.5 (34.7)	4.4 (39.9)	8.2 (46.8)	12.7 (54.9)	16.0 (60.8)	18.3 (64.9)	17.2 (63.0)	14.3 (57.7)	9.9 (49.8)	4.4 (39.9)	1.0 (33.8)	9.0 (48.2)
Mean daily minimum °C (°F)	−2.6 (27.3)	−1.4 (29.5)	0.9 (33.6)	4.0 (39.2)	8.0 (46.4)	11.2 (52.2)	13.2 (55.8)	12.9 (55.2)	10.6 (51.1)	6.9 (44.4)	1.9 (35.4)	−1.4 (29.5)	5.4 (41.7)
Average precipitation mm (inches)	46 (1.8)	43 (1.7)	40 (1.6)	35 (1.4)	41 (1.6)	50 (2.0)	46 (1.8)	53 (2.1)	36 (1.4)	46 (1.8)	53 (2.1)	52 (2.0)	542 (21.3)
Average precipitation days (≥ 1.0 mm)	6.9	6.0	6.5	6.0	7.4	7.6	8.0	7.9	5.6	5.7	6.7	7.1	81.4
Source: MeteoSwiss
