= Villars-le-Terroir =

- Municipality
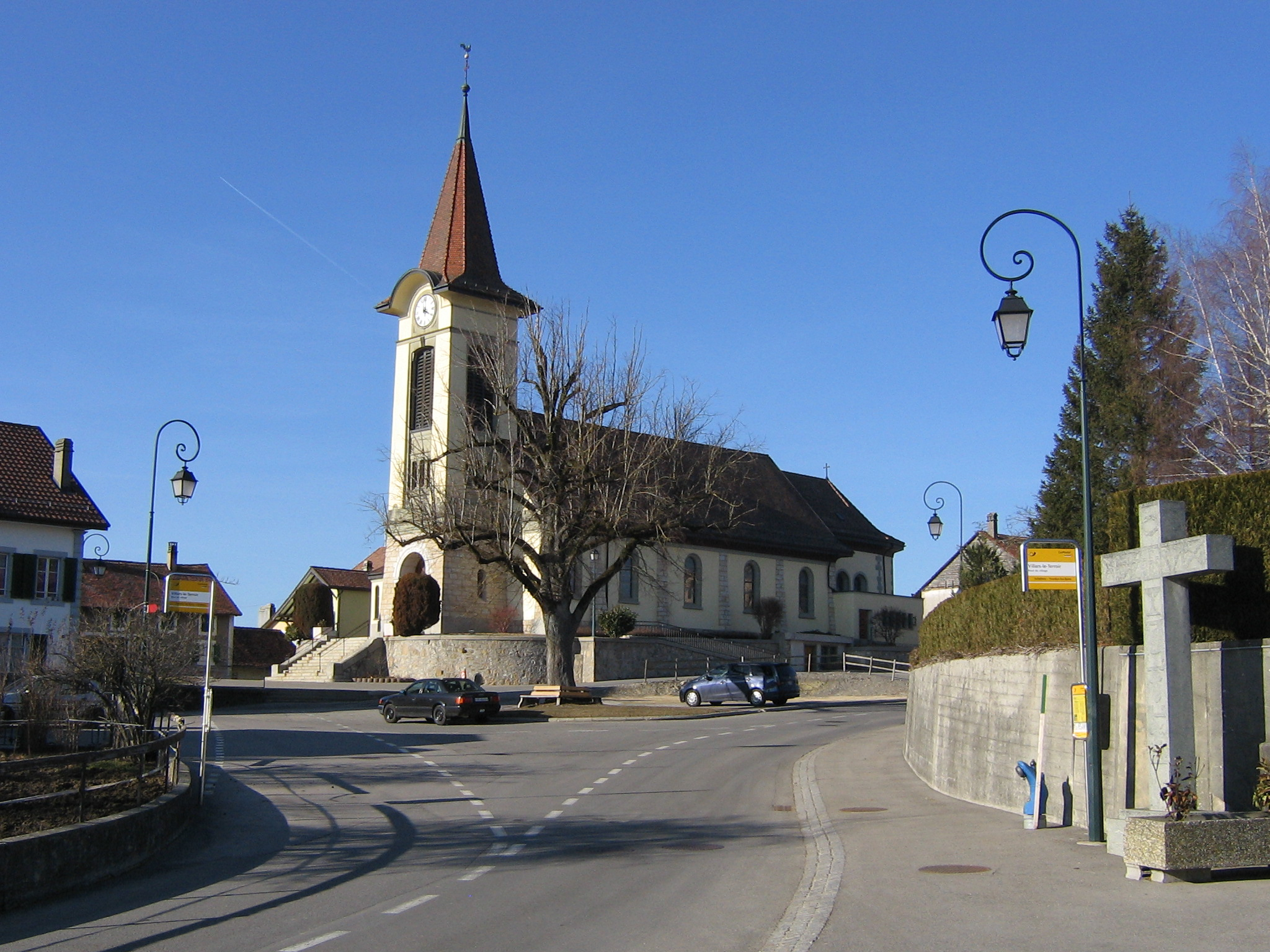

- Flag Coat of arms
- Location of Villars-le-Terroir
- Location within Switzerland Location within Canton of Vaud
- Coordinates: 46°39′N 6°38′E
- Country: Switzerland
- Canton: Vaud
- District: Gros-de-Vaud

Government
  - Mayor: Syndic

Area
  - Total: 7.09 km^{2} (2.74 sq mi)
- Elevation: 647 m (2,123 ft)

Population (December 2004)
  - Total: 737
  - Density: 104/km^{2} (269/sq mi)
- Time zone: UTC+01:00 (CET)
  - Summer (DST): UTC+02:00 (CEST)
- Postal code: 1040
- SFOS number: 5537
- ISO 3166 code: CH-VD
- Surrounded by: Echallens, Fey, Goumoens-la-Ville, Penthéréaz, Poliez-le-Grand, Sugnens, Vuarrens
- Website: villars-le-terroir.ch

Villars-le-Terroir is a municipality in the district of Gros-de-Vaud in the canton of Vaud in Switzerland.

== Geography ==
Villars-le-Terroir has an area, as of 2009, of 7.09 square kilometres (2.74 sq mi). Of this area, 5.47 km^{2} (2.11 sq mi) or 77.2% is used for agricultural purposes, while 1.02 km^{2} (0.39 sq mi) or 14.4% is forested. Of the rest of the land, 0.63 km^{2} (0.24 sq mi) or 8.9% is settled (buildings or roads).

Of the built up area, housing and buildings made up 5.2% and transportation infrastructure made up 3.1%. Out of the forested land, all of the forested land area is covered with heavy forests. Of the agricultural land, 64.0% is used for growing crops and 12.8% is pastures.

The municipality was part of the Echallens District until it was dissolved on 31 August 2006, and Villars-le-Terroir became part of the new district of Gros-de-Vaud.

== Coat of arms ==
The blazon of the municipal coat of arms is Azure, a Chevron Argent between three Bezants (Or) two and one.

== Demographics ==
Villars-le-Terroir has a population (as of December 2020) of 1,280. As of 2008, 5.8% of the population are resident foreign nationals. Over the last 10 years (1999–2009 ) the population has changed at a rate of 19%. It has changed at a rate of 13.3% due to migration and at a rate of 4.7% due to births and deaths.

Most of the population (as of 2000) speaks French (600 or 94.2%), with German being second most common (16 or 2.5%) and Italian being third (5 or 0.8%).

Of the population in the municipality 272 or about 42.7% were born in Villars-le-Terroir and lived there in 2000. There were 207 or 32.5% who were born in the same canton, while 73 or 11.5% were born somewhere else in Switzerland, and 60 or 9.4% were born outside of Switzerland.

In 2008 there were 7 live births to Swiss citizens and 1 birth to non-Swiss citizens, and in same time span there were 8 deaths of Swiss citizens. Ignoring immigration and emigration, the population of Swiss citizens decreased by 1 while the foreign population increased by 1. There were 2 Swiss men and 2 Swiss women who immigrated back to Switzerland. At the same time, there were 4 non-Swiss men and 2 non-Swiss women who immigrated from another country to Switzerland. The total Swiss population change in 2008 (from all sources, including moves across municipal borders) was a decrease of 6 and the non-Swiss population decreased by 3 people. This represents a population growth rate of -1.2%.

The age distribution, as of 2009, in Villars-le-Terroir is; 90 children or 12.0% of the population are between 0 and 9 years old and 90 teenagers or 12.0% are between 10 and 19. Of the adult population, 99 people or 13.1% of the population are between 20 and 29 years old. 89 people or 11.8% are between 30 and 39, 124 people or 16.5% are between 40 and 49, and 103 people or 13.7% are between 50 and 59. The senior population distribution is 79 people or 10.5% of the population are between 60 and 69 years old, 52 people or 6.9% are between 70 and 79, there are 26 people or 3.5% who are between 80 and 89, and there is 1 person who is 90 and older.

As of 2000, there were 255 people who were single and never married in the municipality. There were 330 married individuals, 27 widows or widowers and 25 individuals who are divorced.

As of 2000, there were 243 private households in the municipality, and an average of 2.6 persons per household. There were 54 households that consist of only one person and 21 households with five or more people. Out of a total of 251 households that answered this question, 21.5% were households made up of just one person and there were 4 adults who lived with their parents. Of the rest of the households, there are 78 married couples without children, 95 married couples with children There were 9 single parents with a child or children. There were 3 households that were made up of unrelated people and 8 households that were made up of some sort of institution or another collective housing.

In 2000 there were 88 single family homes (or 50.9% of the total) out of a total of 173 inhabited buildings. There were 38 multi-family buildings (22.0%), along with 38 multi-purpose buildings that were mostly used for housing (22.0%) and 9 other use buildings (commercial or industrial) that also had some housing (5.2%). Of the single family homes 29 were built before 1919, while 13 were built between 1990 and 2000. The most multi-family homes (9) were built between 1981 and 1990 and the next most (8) were built before 1919. There were 4 multi-family houses built between 1996 and 2000.

In 2000 there were 265 apartments in the municipality. The most common apartment size was 3 rooms of which there were 72. There were 8 single room apartments and 87 apartments with five or more rooms. Of these apartments, a total of 235 apartments (88.7% of the total) were permanently occupied, while 22 apartments (8.3%) were seasonally occupied and 8 apartments (3.0%) were empty. As of 2009, the construction rate of new housing units was 19.9 new units per 1000 residents. The vacancy rate for the municipality, in 2010, was 0%.

The historical population is given in the following chart:

== Politics ==
In the 2007 federal election the most popular party was the SVP which received 33.4% of the vote. The next three most popular parties were the CVP (20.53%), the FDP (15.94%) and the SP (10.79%). In the federal election, a total of 248 votes were cast, and the voter turnout was 45.8%.

== Economy ==
As of 2010, Villars-le-Terroir had an unemployment rate of 2.2%. As of 2008, there were 69 people employed in the primary economic sector and about 29 businesses involved in this sector. 19 people were employed in the secondary sector and there were 3 businesses in this sector. 43 people were employed in the tertiary sector, with 17 businesses in this sector. There were 329 residents of the municipality who were employed in some capacity, of which females made up 42.2% of the workforce.

In 2008 the total number of full-time equivalent jobs was 93. The number of jobs in the primary sector was 43, of which 42 were in agriculture and were in fishing or fisheries. The number of jobs in the secondary sector was 18, all of which were in construction. The number of jobs in the tertiary sector was 32. In the tertiary sector; 5 or 15.6% were in wholesale or retail sales or the repair of motor vehicles, 3 or 9.4% were in the movement and storage of goods, 6 or 18.8% were in a hotel or restaurant, 1 was in the information industry, 5 or 15.6% were technical professionals or scientists, 7 or 21.9% were in education.

In 2000, there were 34 workers who commuted into the municipality and 239 workers who commuted away. The municipality is a net exporter of workers, with about 7.0 workers leaving the municipality for every one entering. Of the working population, 6.7% used public transportation to get to work, and 69% used a private car.

== Religion ==
From the 2000 census, 409 or 64.2% were Roman Catholic, while 139 or 21.8% belonged to the Swiss Reformed Church. Of the rest of the population, there was 1 member of an Orthodox church, and there were 4 individuals (or about 0.63% of the population) who belonged to another Christian church. There were 2 (or about 0.31% of the population) who were Islamic. There were 1 individual who belonged to another church. 53 (or about 8.32% of the population) belonged to no church, are agnostic or atheist, and 30 individuals (or about 4.71% of the population) did not answer the question.

== Education ==
In Villars-le-Terroir about 246 or (38.6%) of the population have completed non-mandatory upper secondary education, and 63 or (9.9%) have completed additional higher education (either university or a Fachhochschule). Of the 63 who completed tertiary schooling, 63.5% were Swiss men, 23.8% were Swiss women, 9.5% were non-Swiss men.

In the 2009/2010 school year there were a total of 104 students in the Villars-le-Terroir school district. In the Vaud cantonal school system, two years of non-obligatory pre-school are provided by the political districts. During the school year, the political district provided pre-school care for a total of 296 children of which 96 children (32.4%) received subsidized pre-school care. The canton's primary school program requires students to attend for four years. There were 60 students in the municipal primary school program. The obligatory lower secondary school program lasts for six years and there were 44 students in those schools.

As of 2000, there were 33 students in Villars-le-Terroir who came from another municipality, while 72 residents attended schools outside the municipality.
