= Poliez-le-Grand =

- Former municipality
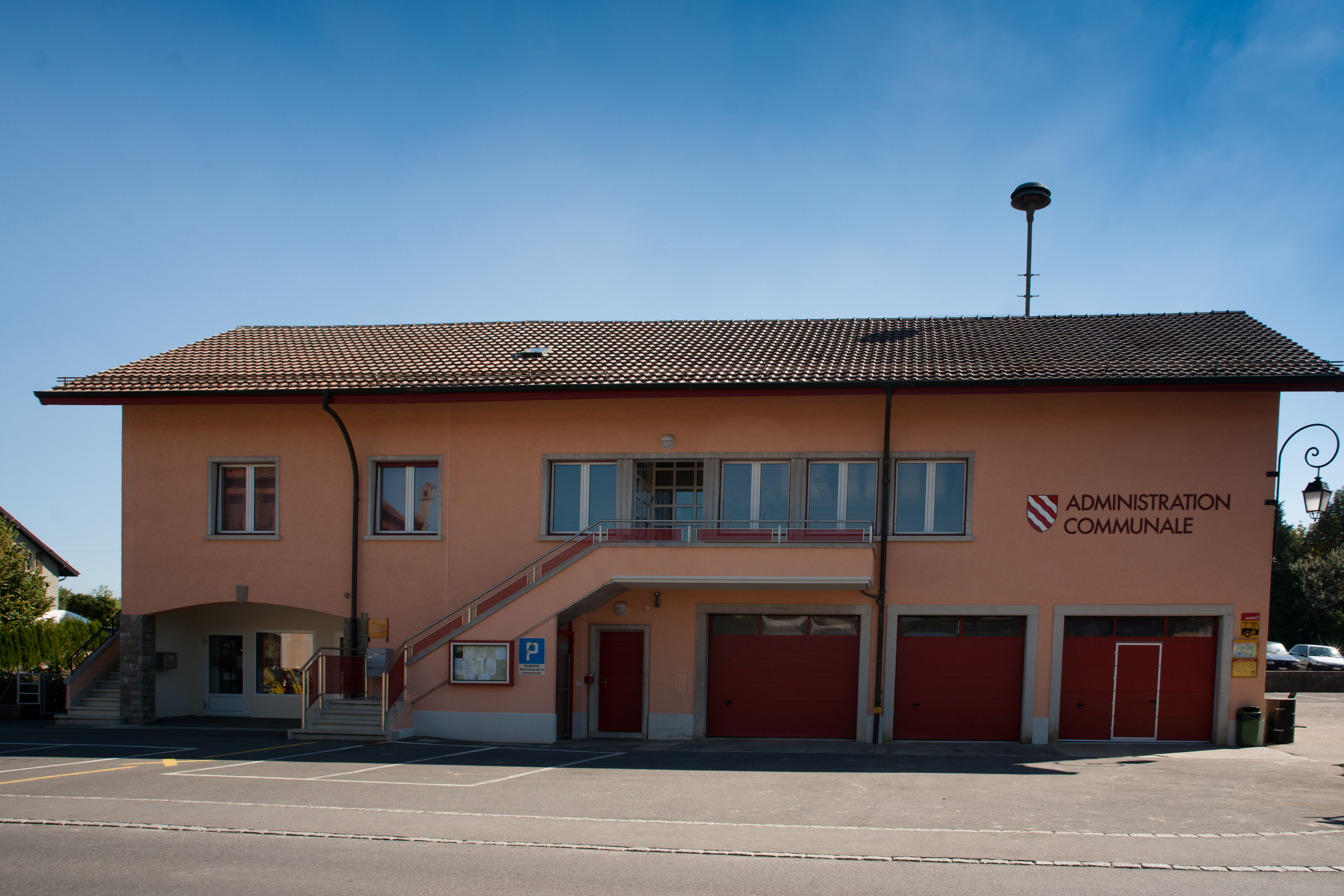
- Poliez-le-Grand town hall

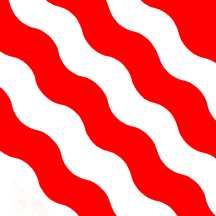
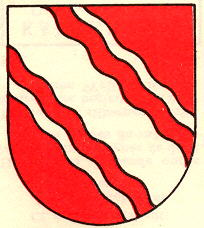
- Flag Coat of arms
- Location of Poliez-le-Grand
- Location within Switzerland Location within Canton of Vaud
- Coordinates: 46°38′N 6°40′E
- Country: Switzerland
- Canton: Vaud
- District: Gros-de-Vaud

Area
  - Total: 5.07 km^{2} (1.96 sq mi)
- Elevation: 695 m (2,280 ft)

Population (December 2009)
  - Total: 692
  - Density: 136/km^{2} (354/sq mi)
- Time zone: UTC+01:00 (CET)
  - Summer (DST): UTC+02:00 (CEST)
- Postal code: 1041
- SFOS number: 5532
- ISO 3166 code: CH-VD
- Surrounded by: Bottens, Dommartin, Echallens, Naz, Poliez-Pittet, Sugnens, Villars-le-Terroir
- Website: Profile (in French), SFSO statistics

Poliez-le-Grand is a former municipality in the district of Gros-de-Vaud in the canton of Vaud in Switzerland.

The municipalities of Dommartin, Naz, Poliez-le-Grand and Sugnens merged on 1 July 2011 into the new municipality of Montilliez.

== History ==
Poliez-le-Grand is first mentioned around 1160-79 as Poleto. In 1225 it was mentioned as Pollie lo Grant.

== Geography ==
Poliez-le-Grand has an area, as of 2009, of 5.07 square kilometers (1.96 sq mi). Of this area, 4.02 km^{2} (1.55 sq mi) or 79.3% is used for agricultural purposes, while 0.6 km^{2} (0.23 sq mi) or 11.8% is forested. Of the rest of the land, 0.43 km^{2} (0.17 sq mi) or 8.5% is settled (buildings or roads).

Of the built up area, housing and buildings made up 4.9% and transportation infrastructure made up 2.8%. Out of the forested land, all of the forested land area is covered with heavy forests. Of the agricultural land, 63.1% is used for growing crops and 15.2% is pastures.

The municipality was part of the Echallens District until it was dissolved on 31 August 2006, and Poliez-le-Grand became part of the new district of Gros-de-Vaud.

The municipality is located on the right bank of the Talent river.

== Coat of arms ==
The blazon of the municipal coat of arms is Bendy wavy of Eight Gules and Argent.

== Demographics ==
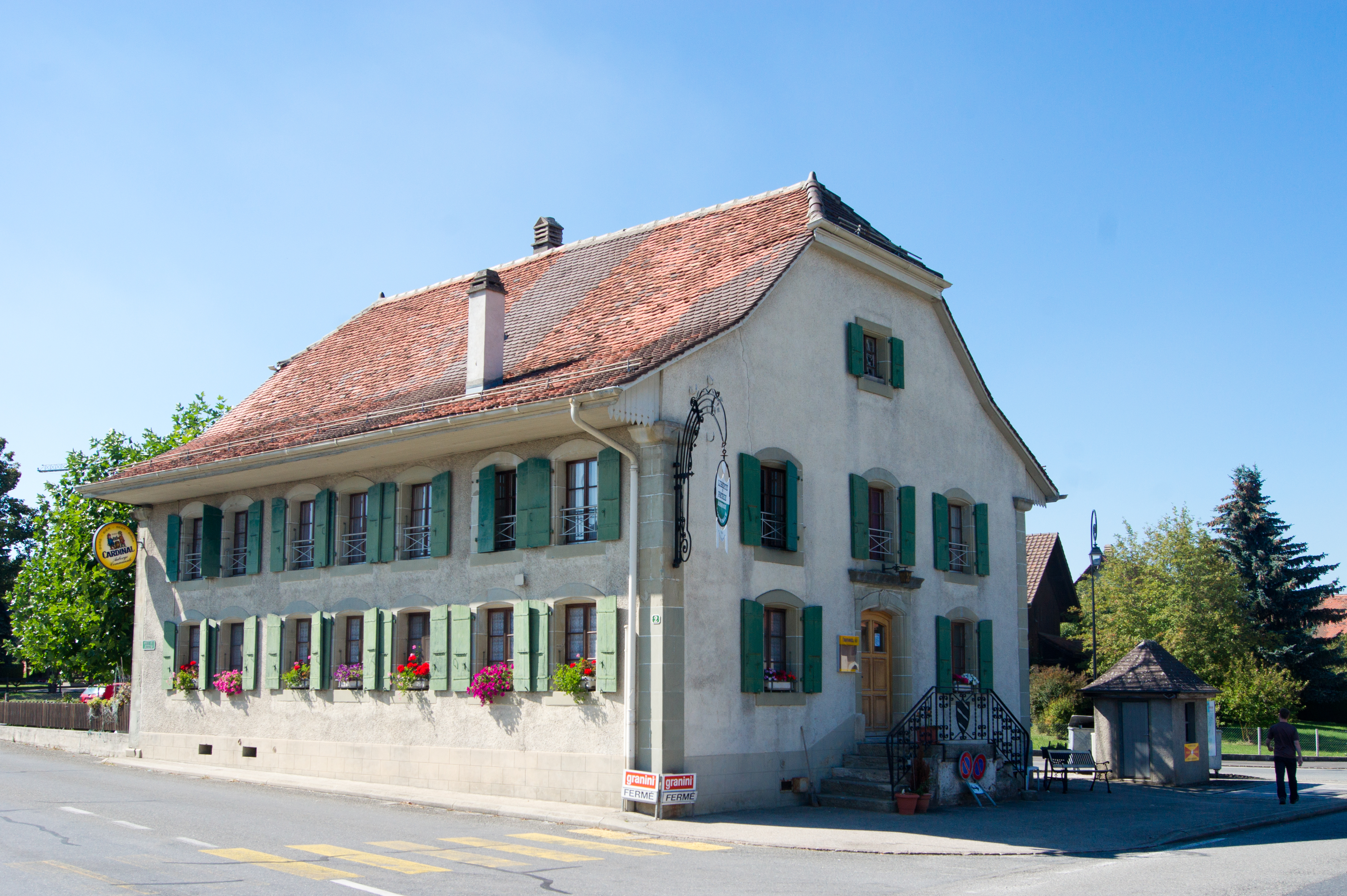
Hostel building in Poliez-le-Grand

Poliez-le-Grand has a population (as of 2009) of 692. As of 2008, 12.5% of the population are resident foreign nationals. Over the last 10 years (1999–2009) the population has changed at a rate of 31.3%. It has changed at a rate of 26.4% due to migration and at a rate of 6.1% due to births and deaths.

Most of the population (as of 2000) speaks French (497 or 94.1%), with German being second most common (20 or 3.8%) and Spanish being third (4 or 0.8%). There are 2 people who speak Italian and 1 person who speaks Romansh.

Of the population in the municipality 139 or about 26.3% were born in Poliez-le-Grand and lived there in 2000. There were 254 or 48.1% who were born in the same canton, while 70 or 13.3% were born somewhere else in Switzerland, and 50 or 9.5% were born outside of Switzerland.

In 2008 there were 6 live births to Swiss citizens and were 2 deaths of Swiss citizens. Ignoring immigration and emigration, the population of Swiss citizens increased by 4 while the foreign population remained the same. There was 1 Swiss woman who immigrated back to Switzerland. At the same time, there were 2 non-Swiss men and 4 non-Swiss women who immigrated from another country to Switzerland. The total Swiss population change in 2008 (from all sources, including moves across municipal borders) was an increase of 53 and the non-Swiss population increased by 23 people. This represents a population growth rate of 12.4%.

The age distribution, as of 2009, in Poliez-le-Grand is; 150 children or 21.7% of the population are between 0 and 9 years old and 106 teenagers or 15.3% are between 10 and 19. Of the adult population, 72 people or 10.4% of the population are between 20 and 29 years old. 93 people or 13.4% are between 30 and 39, 98 people or 14.2% are between 40 and 49, and 78 people or 11.3% are between 50 and 59. The senior population distribution is 48 people or 6.9% of the population are between 60 and 69 years old, 27 people or 3.9% are between 70 and 79, there are 17 people or 2.5% who are between 80 and 89, and there are 3 people or 0.4% who are 90 and older.

As of 2000, there were 225 people who were single and never married in the municipality. There were 259 married individuals, 21 widows or widowers and 23 individuals who are divorced.

As of 2000 the average number of residents per living room was 0.64 which is about equal to the cantonal average of 0.61 per room. In this case, a room is defined as space of a housing unit of at least 4 m^{2} (43 sq ft) as normal bedrooms, dining rooms, living rooms, kitchens and habitable cellars and attics. About 57.7% of the total households were owner occupied, or in other words did not pay rent (though they may have a mortgage or a rent-to-own agreement).

As of 2000, there were 193 private households in the municipality, and an average of 2.7 persons per household. There were 41 households that consist of only one person and 21 households with five or more people. Out of a total of 199 households that answered this question, 20.6% were households made up of just one person. Of the rest of the households, there are 51 married couples without children, 85 married couples with children There were 12 single parents with a child or children. There were 4 households that were made up of unrelated people and 6 households that were made up of some sort of institution or another collective housing.

In 2000 there were 74 single family homes (or 56.5% of the total) out of a total of 131 inhabited buildings. There were 27 multi-family buildings (20.6%), along with 26 multi-purpose buildings that were mostly used for housing (19.8%) and 4 other use buildings (commercial or industrial) that also had some housing (3.1%). Of the single family homes 17 were built before 1919, while 11 were built between 1990 and 2000. The most multi-family homes (10) were built before 1919 and the next most (7) were built between 1981 and 1990. There was 1 multi-family house built between 1996 and 2000.

In 2000 there were 211 apartments in the municipality. The most common apartment size was 4 rooms of which there were 56. There were 11 single room apartments and 81 apartments with five or more rooms. Of these apartments, a total of 189 apartments (89.6% of the total) were permanently occupied, while 18 apartments (8.5%) were seasonally occupied and 4 apartments (1.9%) were empty. As of 2009, the construction rate of new housing units was 4.3 new units per 1000 residents. The vacancy rate for the municipality, in 2010, was 0.36%.

The historical population is given in the following chart:

== Politics ==
In the 2007 federal election the most popular party was the SVP which received 35.73% of the vote. The next three most popular parties were the SP (15.39%), the FDP (14.32%) and the Green Party (13.39%). In the federal election, a total of 177 votes were cast, and the voter turnout was 42.3%.

== Religion ==
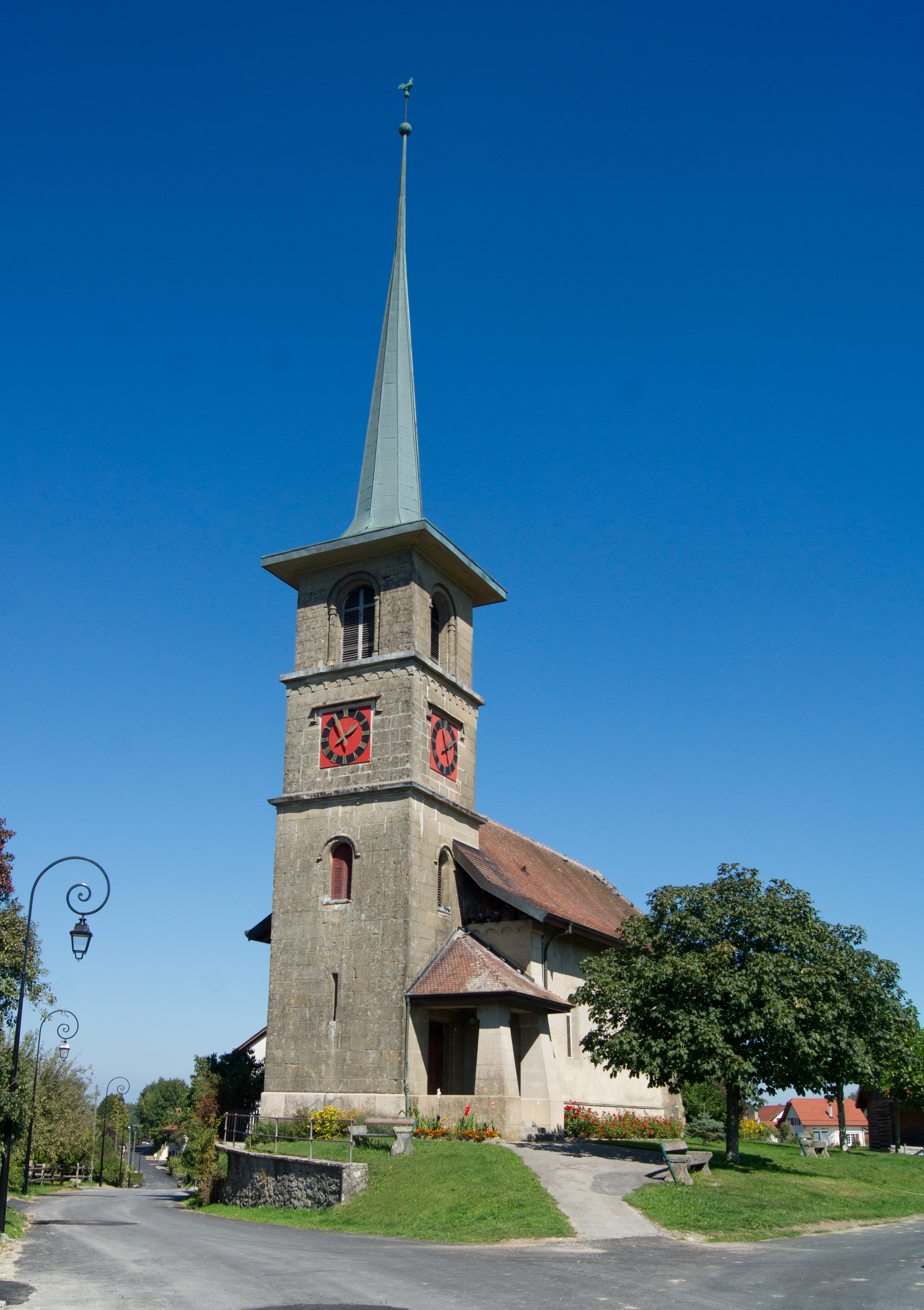
A church in the village

From the 2000 census, 186 or 35.2% were Roman Catholic, while 265 or 50.2% belonged to the Swiss Reformed Church. Of the rest of the population, there was 1 member of an Orthodox church, and there were 21 individuals (or about 3.98% of the population) who belonged to another Christian church. There was 1 individual who was Islamic. 48 (or about 9.09% of the population) belonged to no church, are agnostic or atheist, and 16 individuals (or about 3.03% of the population) did not answer the question.

== Economy ==
As of 2010, Poliez-le-Grand had an unemployment rate of 2.5%. As of 2008, there were 29 people employed in the primary economic sector and about 14 businesses involved in this sector. 83 people were employed in the secondary sector and there were 19 businesses in this sector. 45 people were employed in the tertiary sector, with 17 businesses in this sector. There were 288 residents of the municipality who were employed in some capacity, of which females made up 44.8% of the workforce.

In 2008 the total number of full-time equivalent jobs was 133. The number of jobs in the primary sector was 19, all of which were in agriculture. The number of jobs in the secondary sector was 79 of which 15 or (19.0%) were in manufacturing and 64 (81.0%) were in construction. The number of jobs in the tertiary sector was 35. In the tertiary sector; 3 or 8.6% were in the sale or repair of motor vehicles, 2 or 5.7% were in the movement and storage of goods, 2 or 5.7% were in a hotel or restaurant, 7 or 20.0% were in the information industry, 1 was the insurance or financial industry, 6 or 17.1% were technical professionals or scientists, 5 or 14.3% were in education and 1 was in health care.

In 2000, there were 39 workers who commuted into the municipality and 224 workers who commuted away. The municipality is a net exporter of workers, with about 5.7 workers leaving the municipality for every one entering. Of the working population, 10.4% used public transportation to get to work, and 71.9% used a private car.

== Education ==
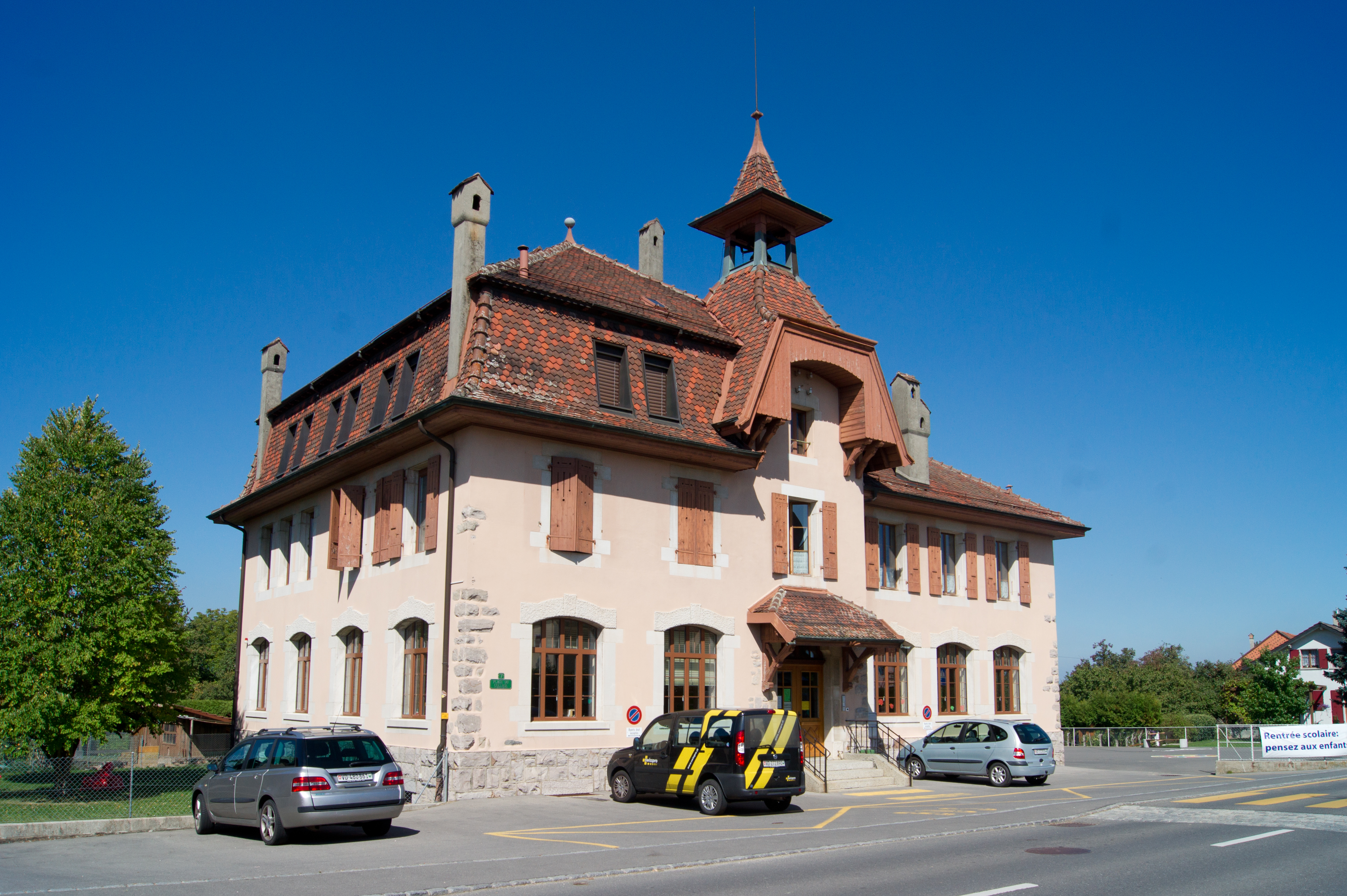
Village school house

In Poliez-le-Grand about 207 or (39.2%) of the population have completed non-mandatory upper secondary education, and 64 or (12.1%) have completed additional higher education (either University or a Fachhochschule). Of the 64 who completed tertiary schooling, 57.8% were Swiss men, 26.6% were Swiss women, 10.9% were non-Swiss men.

In the 2009/2010 school year there were a total of 83 students in the Poliez-le-Grand school district. In the Vaud cantonal school system, two years of non-obligatory pre-school are provided by the political districts. During the school year, the political district provided pre-school care for a total of 296 children of which 96 children (32.4%) received subsidized pre-school care. The canton's primary school program requires students to attend for four years. There were 41 students in the municipal primary school program. The obligatory lower secondary school program lasts for six years and there were 41 students in those schools. There were also 1 students who were home schooled or attended another non-traditional school.

As of 2000, there were 25 students in Poliez-le-Grand who came from another municipality, while 90 residents attended schools outside the municipality.
