= Lausanne-Gare station =

Lausanne Metro station

Lausanne-Gare
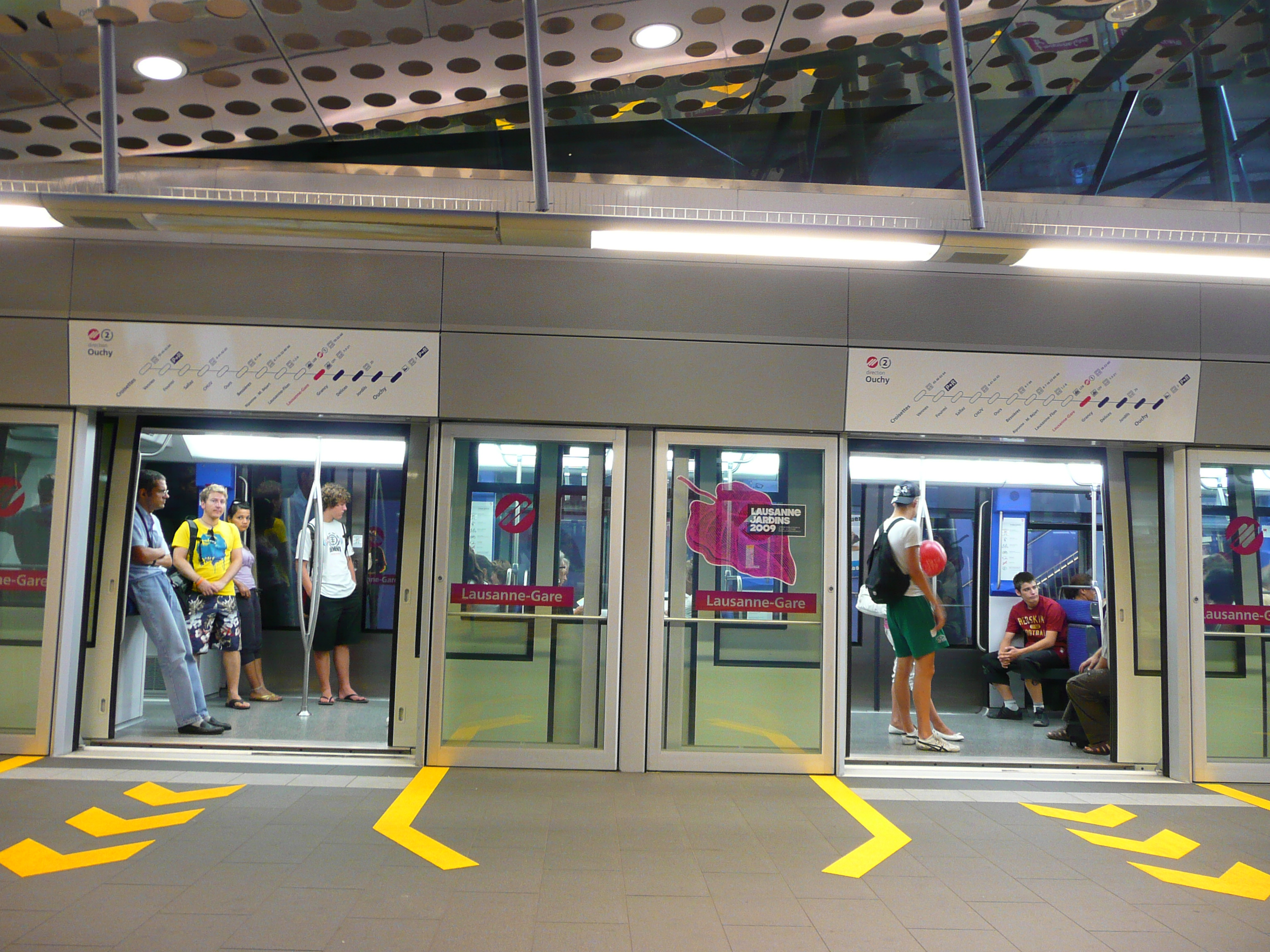
- A train at M2-Lausanne-Gare

General information
- Location: Switzerland
- Coordinates: 46°31′2.1″N 6°37′48.5″E
- System: Lausanne Metro station
- Line: Line M2

History
- Opened: 27 October 2008

Services
Preceding station	Lausanne Metro	Following station
Grancy towards Ouchy-Olympique	M2	Lausanne-Flon towards Croisettes
Location

Lausanne-Gare is a Lausanne Metro station on Line M2. It was opened on 27 October 2008 as part of the inaugural section of the line, from Croisettes to Ouchy–Olympique. The station is located between Lausanne-Flon and Grancy. The station is located in Lausanne railway station, hence the name.

In 1877, a funicular between Lausanne and Ouchy was opened. In 1879, a funicular from Lausanne railway station uphill to Lausanne-Flon was opened as well. It functioned until 1959, when funicular was rebuilt as a rack railway. In 2003, the whole section between Lausanne-Flon and Ouchy was demolished to give way for construction of M2 line.
