= Délices station =

Lausanne Metro station

Délices
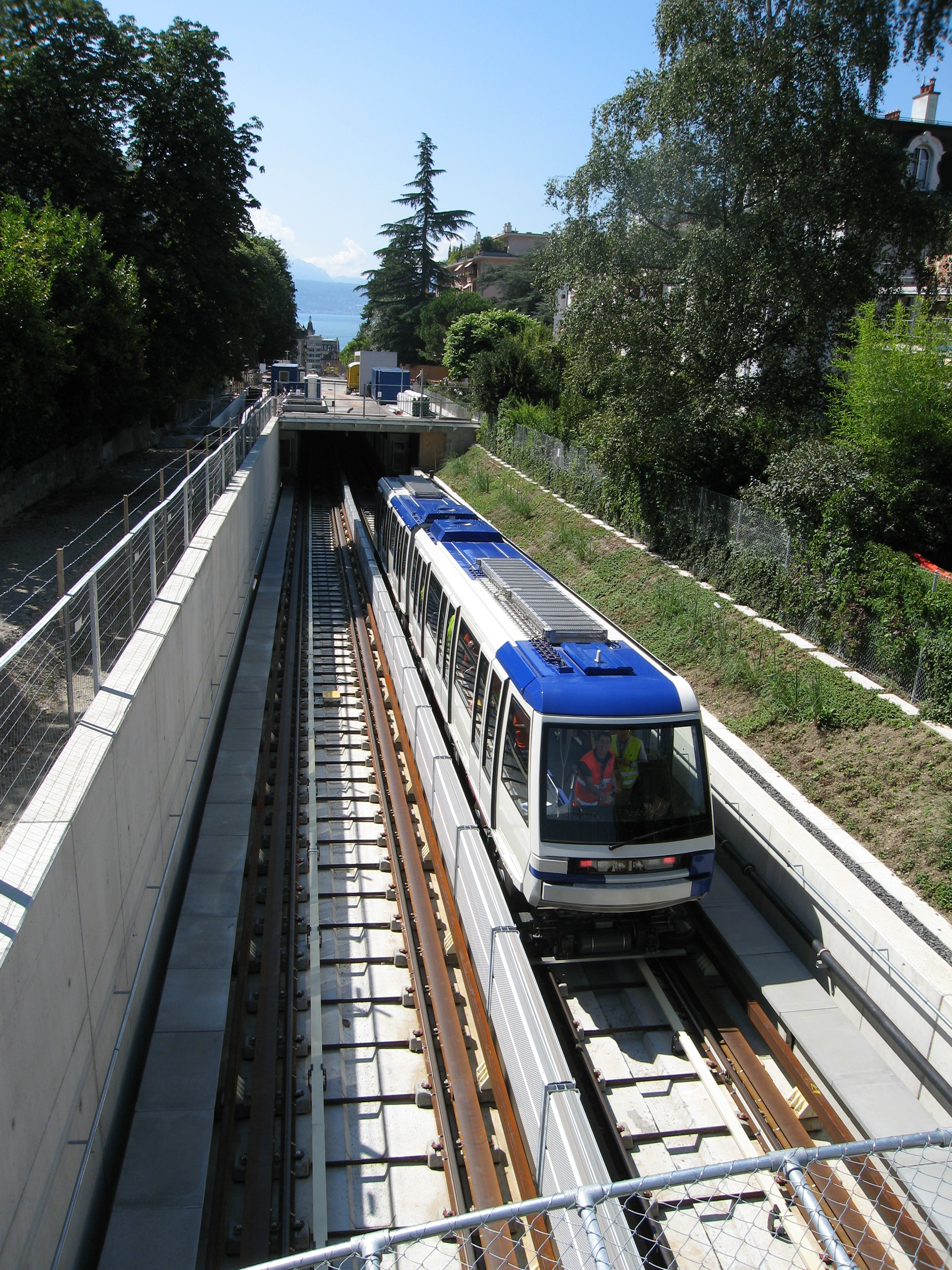
- M2 train approaching Délices

General information
- Location: Switzerland
- Coordinates: 46°30′44.1″N 6°37′41.1″E
- System: Lausanne Metro station
- Line: Line M2

History
- Opened: 27 October 2008

Services
Preceding station	Lausanne Metro	Following station
Jordils towards Ouchy-Olympique	M2	Grancy towards Croisettes
Location

Délices is a Lausanne Metro station on Line M2. It was opened on 27 October 2008 as part of the inaugural section of the line, from Croisettes to Ouchy–Olympique. The station is located between Grancy and Jordils.

In 1877, a funicular between Lausanne and Ouchy was opened. In 1898, Montriond station was added to it, and in 1959 the funicular was rebuilt as a rack railway. In 2003, the railway was demolished to give way for construction of M2 line. Montriond station was demolished as well and move closer to Lausanne railway station; in 2008 it was reopened as Grancy. At the same time, Délices was opened as a new station between Jordils and the former location of Montriond.
