= Grancy station =

Lausanne Metro station

Grancy

General information
- Location: Switzerland
- Coordinates: 46°30′53.6″N 6°37′43.9″E
- System: Lausanne Metro station
- Line: Line M2

History
- Opened: 27 October 2008

Services
Preceding station	Lausanne Metro	Following station
Délices towards Ouchy-Olympique	M2	Lausanne-Gare towards Croisettes
Location

Grancy is a Lausanne Metro station on Line M2. It was opened on 27 October 2008 as part of the inaugural section of the line, from Croisettes to Ouchy–Olympique. The station is located between Lausanne-Gare and Délices.

In 1877, a funicular between Lausanne and Ouchy was opened. In 1898, Montriond station was added to it, and in 1959 the funicular was rebuilt as a rack railway. In 2003, the railway was demolished to give way for construction of the M2 line. Montriond station was demolished as well and moved closer to Lausanne railway station; in 2008, it was reopened as Grancy.
