= Jordils station =

Lausanne Metro station

Jordils
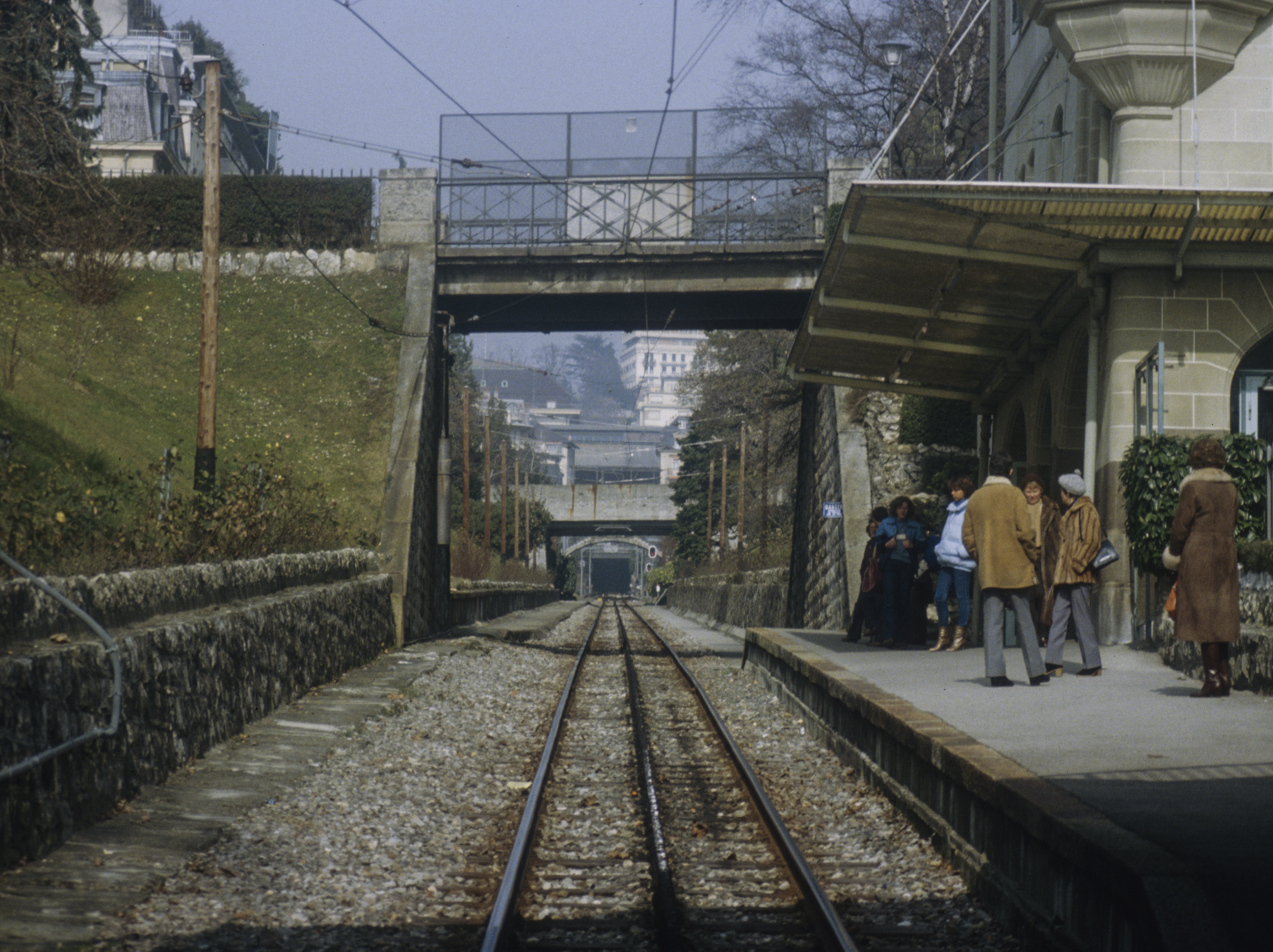
- Jordils station in 1983, when it was part of the Métro Lausanne–Ouchy

General information
- Location: Switzerland
- Coordinates: 46°30′35.6″N 6°37′38.5″E
- System: Lausanne Metro station
- Line: Line M2

History
- Opened: 27 October 2008

Services
| Preceding station | Lausanne Metro | Following station |
|---|---|---|
| Ouchy–Olympique towards Ouchy-Olympique | M2 | Délices towards Croisettes |
Location

Jordils is a Lausanne Metro station on Line M2. It was opened on 27 October 2008 as part of the inaugural section of the line, from Croisettes to Ouchy–Olympique. The station is located between Délices and Ouchy–Olympique.

In 1877, a funicular between Lausanne and Ouchy was opened, which had Jordils station. In 1959 the funicular was rebuilt as a rack railway. In 2003, the railway was demolished to give way for construction of M2 line. In 2008 the station was reopened at the same location.
