= Lausanne-Flon station =

Railway station in Lausanne, Switzerland

Lausanne-Flon
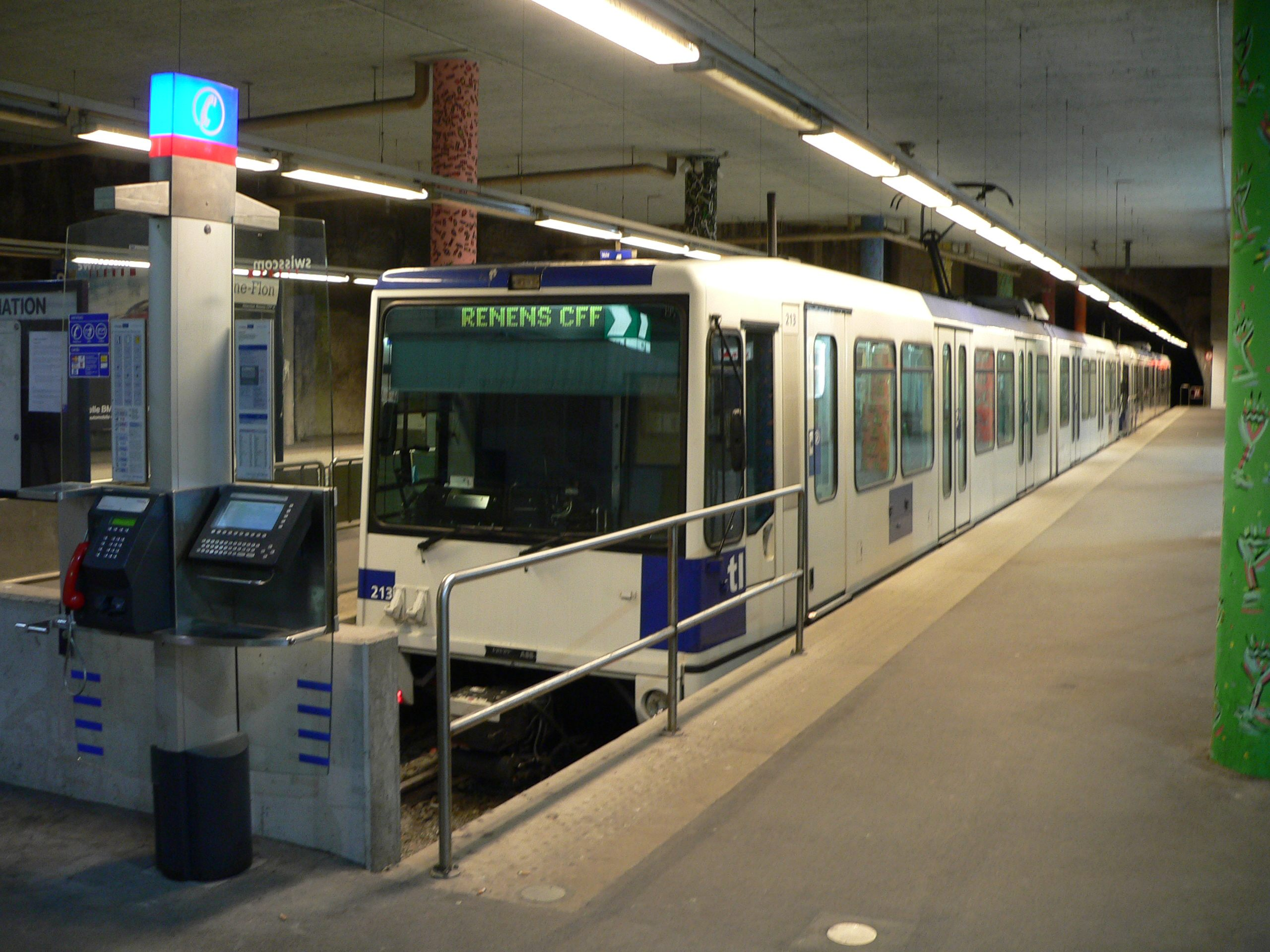
- M1 terminal platforms

General information
- Location: Lausanne; Switzerland
- Coordinates: 46°31′15″N 6°37′49″E
- System: Metro, commuter rail and light rail station
- Owner: Transports publics de la région lausannoise (TL)
- Lines: Lausanne–Echallens–Bercher line; Lausanne Metro Line M1; Lausanne Metro Line M2
- Platforms: LEB: island platform; M1: Spanish solution; M2: side platforms
- Tracks: 6
- Train operators: Lausanne–Echallens–Bercher railway (LEB); Transports publics de la région lausannoise (TL)

Construction
- Structure type: Underground
- Platform levels: 2
- Accessible: Yes

Other information
- Station code: 8501181 (LSFL)
- Fare zone: 11 (Central Lausanne)

History
- Opened: 1877 (as a funicular station)
- Rebuilt: 1956-58 (conversion to rack railway station); 1991 (addition of Metro M1 platforms); 2000 (addition of LEB platforms); 2008 (addition of Metro M2 platforms)

Services
Preceding station	Lausanne Metro	Following station
Vigie towards Renens VD	M1	Terminus
Lausanne-Gare towards Ouchy-Olympique	M2	Riponne towards Croisettes
Preceding station	LEB	Following station
Lausanne-Chauderon towards Echallens or Bercher	R20	Terminus
Location

Lausanne-Flon is a railway and metro station in the Flon district of central Lausanne, Vaud, Switzerland. It is the hub of the Lausanne Metro system. The station's initial building was also the first in the city to use electricity. A station rebuilding project was the subject of a design competition held in 1988.

== History ==
=== Before the métro ===
A railway station in this area dates back to the 1870s. Plans were made for the building of an atmospheric railway between Flon, the main Lausanne railway station and Ouchy as early as 1871. Work started on the station site, associated goods facilities and the tunnel under Montbénon, in 1874. The station opened in 1877, and trains were initially powered by a steam-pumped hydraulic system, the engines using water brought 15 km (15,000 m) along purpose-built aqueducts from Bret Lake, north of Puidoux. This source of power was a precursor to the provision of electricity, and in 1882 the original Flon station became the first building in the city to have an electrical supply. Meanwhile, the Lausanne-Ouchy company used spoil extracted from the tunnelling of the line to cover the River Flon and create a new ground level. This was attractive to new businesses and warehouses were quickly built on the newly created land, owned by the Lausanne-Ouchy railway company.

Between 1877 and 1950, the only change at Flon station itself was the switch from atmospheric operation to funicular. Goods services at Flon were withdrawn in 1953, as Swiss Federal Railways opened a new goods depot closer to their own station. Otherwise, there was no significant change to the station until services changed from cable haulage to electric rack railway operation. Ready for the upgraded service, the station was substantially rebuilt between 1956 and 1958, with lifts provided to reach the streets above. However, the design retained many features from its past as a funicular terminus, meaning rolling stock required doors on only one side.

=== 1980s–2010: rebuilds and additional routes ===
The first phase of the modern Flon station was constructed for the opening of Line M1 on 24 May 1991. The line's terminal platforms opened in what had by then become a run-down part of the city, to allow interchange with the Métro Lausanne–Ouchy. The Ouchy line closed in January 2006 for conversion to rubber-tyred metro. By this time, major redevelopment of the area was planned to make it more attractive to both business and leisure.

The Lausanne-Échallens-Bercher railway run commuter trains to the north of Lausanne. The LEB company, whose line historically only reached as far as Lausanne-Chauderon, had long aspired to a station actually within the city centre, and on 28 May 2000 its new underground platforms opened. These new parts of the station had been the subject of a design competition in 1988, which was won by Bernard Tschumi Architects.

On 27 October 2008, Lausanne's M2 line opened, with a new entrance building. This green-roofed structure, which also contains one of TL's two main ticket offices, was constructed slightly to the north of the 1950s building of the Lausanne-Ouchy station. As with the previous rebuild, design work was completed by Bernard Tschumi Architects, who were tasked with incorporating not only the platforms and escalators, but also a ticket office and offices for TL. The construction enables cross-platform interchange from southbound M2 to the LEB.

== Future ==
Flon station is expected to reach 8 platforms by 2018, as work begins to build a third line in the city's Metro system. Once complete, trains on the M3 route will parallel the LEB line as far as Chauderon station en route to Blecherette, and parallel or share the M2 route all the way to Ouchy. Flon has also been identified as the eastern terminus of the planned T1 tram line, expected to operate to Renens from 2018.

Major upgrade work is also planned on the LEB route by 2022, allowing the urban section as far as Cheseaux-sur-Lausanne to operate at a frequency comparable to the métro lines.

== Gallery ==
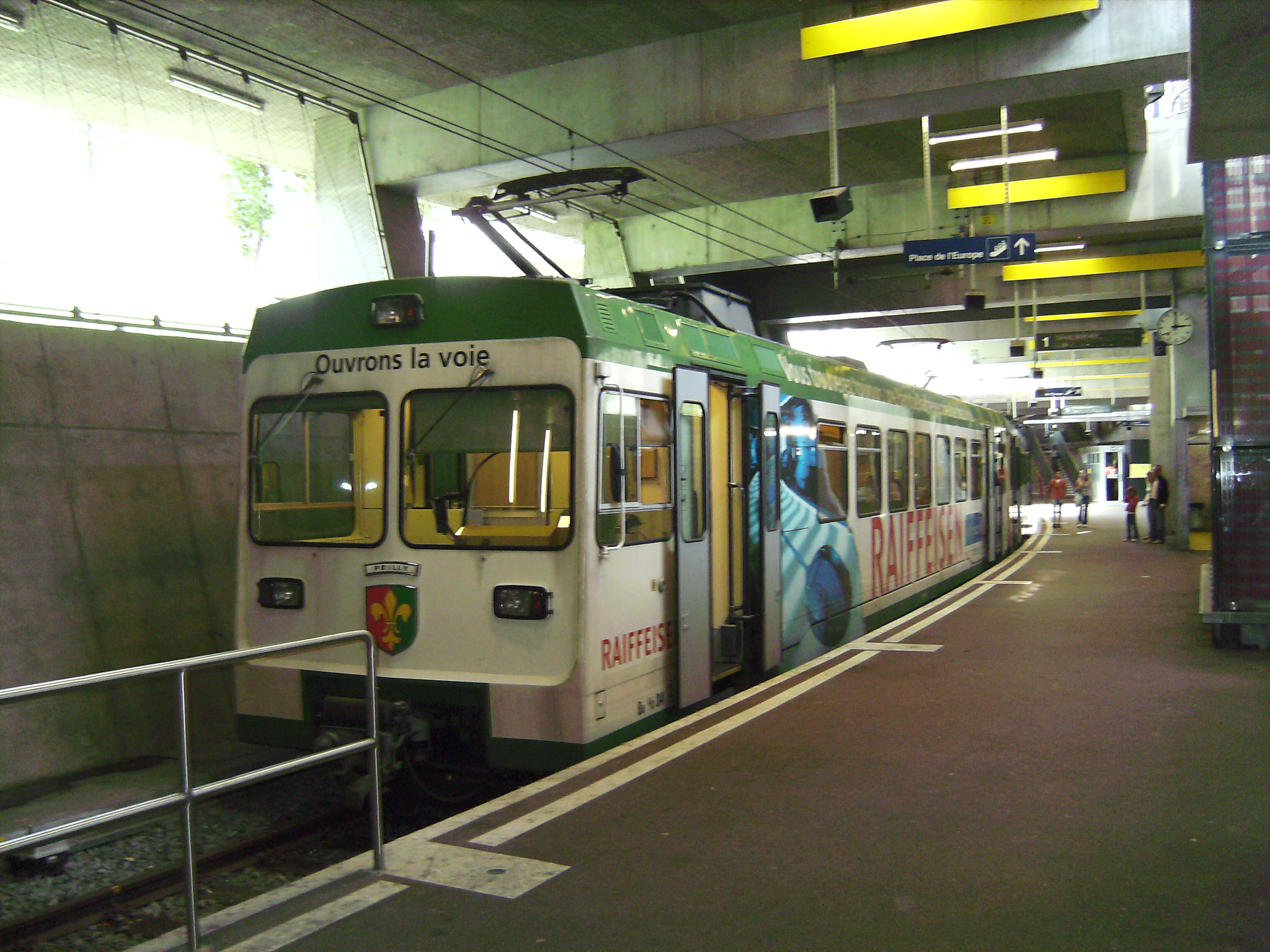
LEB platforms

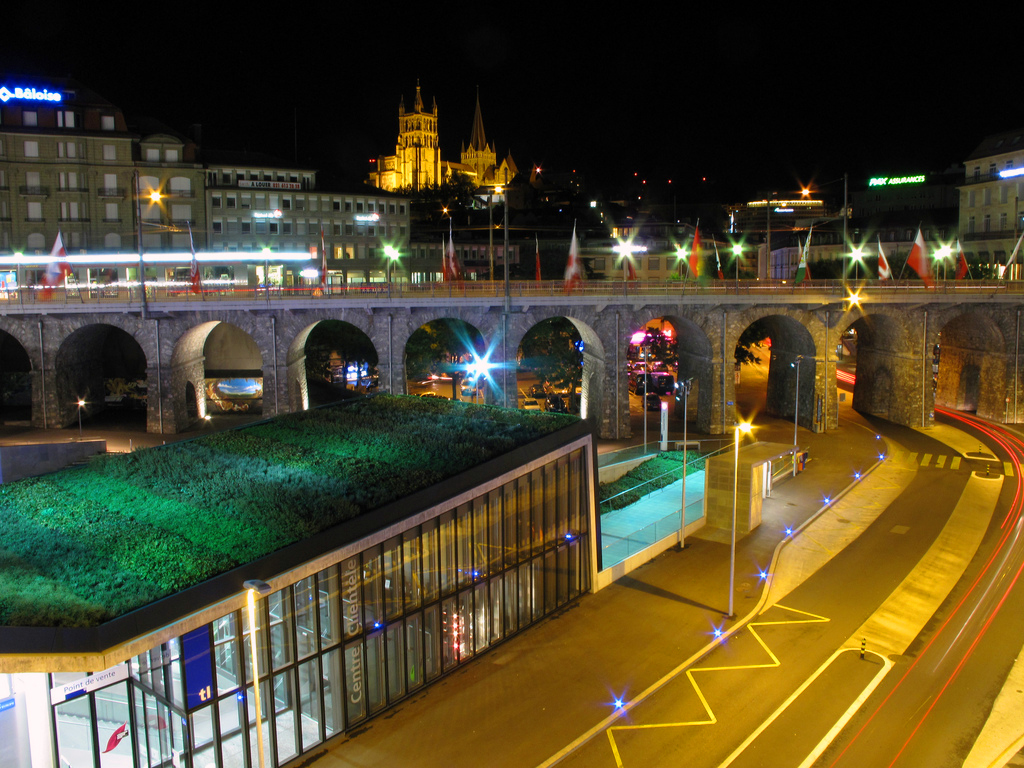
Le Flon

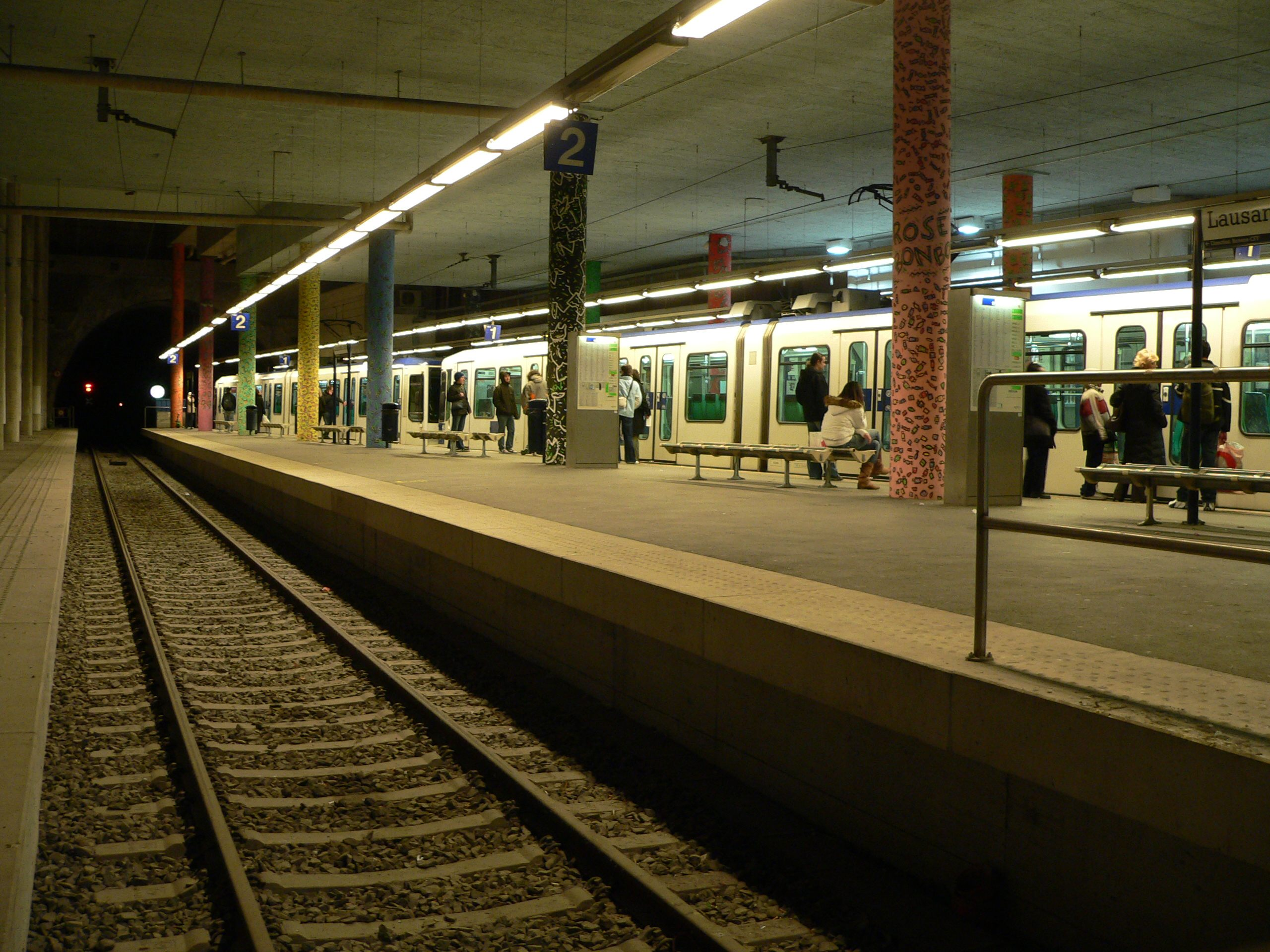
Line M1 platforms (Alternative view)

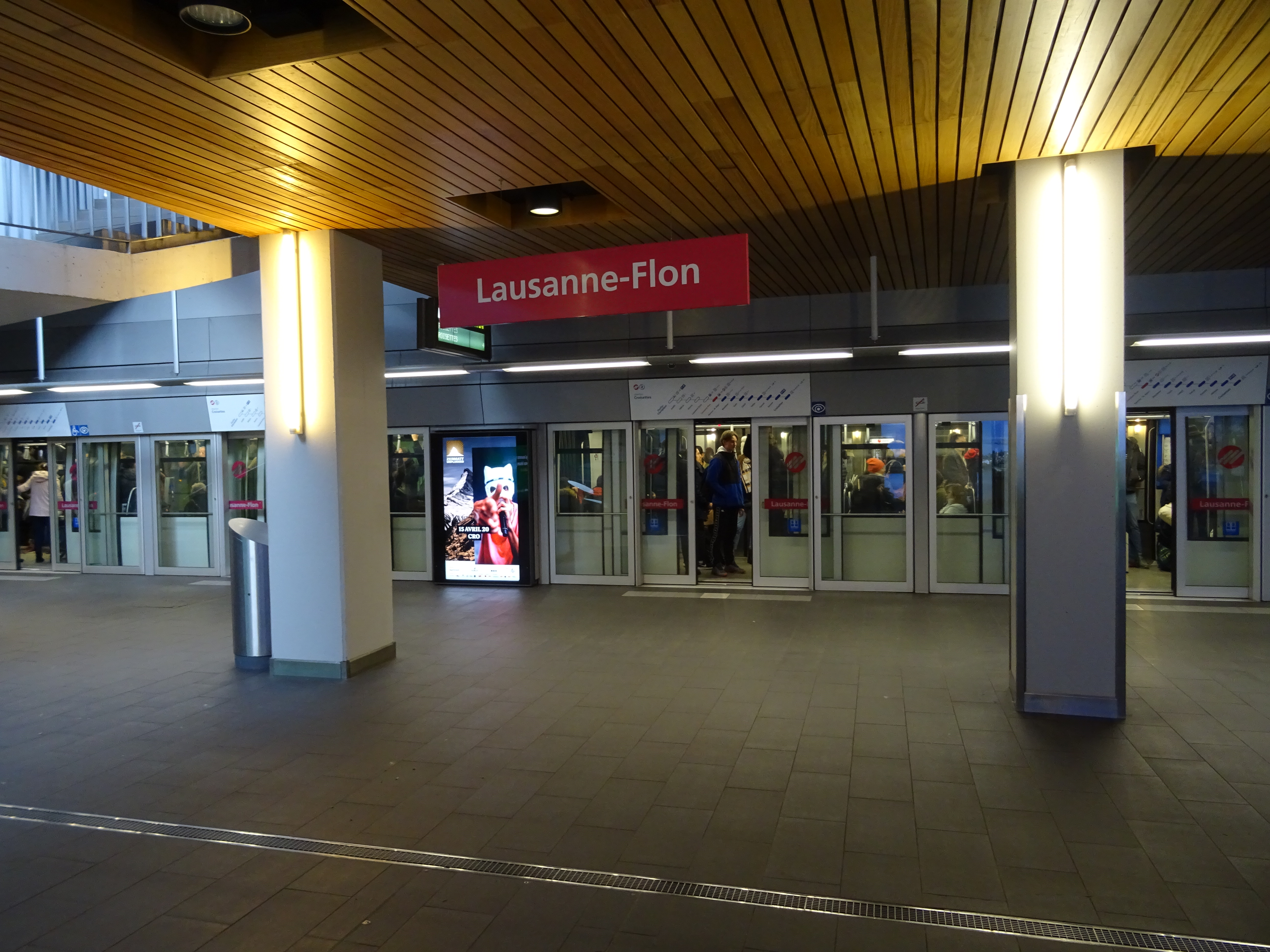
Line M2 platforms

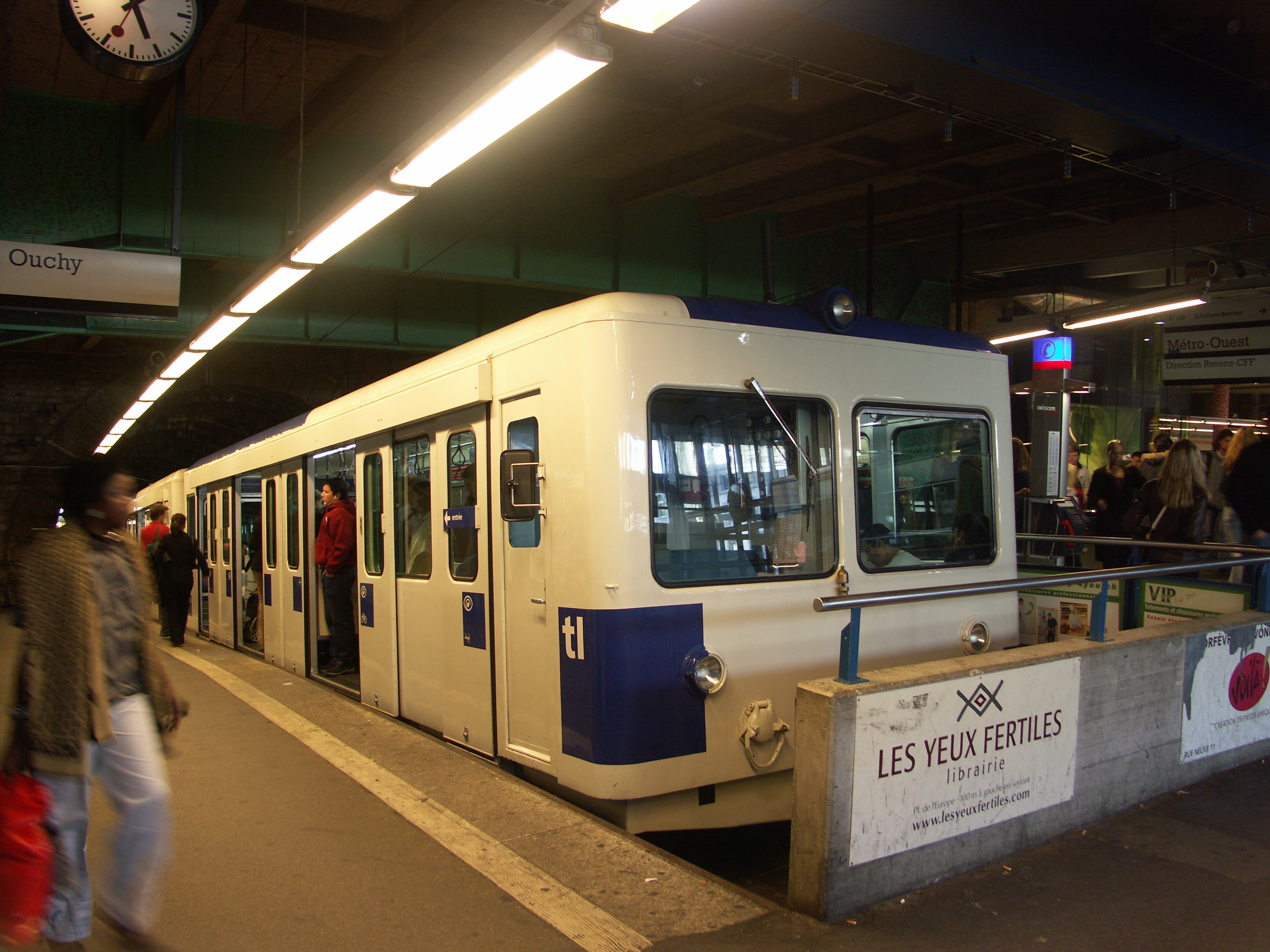
One of the former Métro Lausanne-Ouchy trains (2004)
