= List of bus lines in Lausanne =

The Lausanne bus network has 34 regular bus lines including 11 trolley, 23 urban, and five regional.

== City lines ==
Line	Endpoints	
1	Maladière <—> Blécherette	E
2	Maladière-Lac <—> Desert	E
3	Bellevaux <—> Lausanne, gare	E
4	Prilly, Coudraie <—> Faverges	E
6	Maladière <—> Praz-Séchaud	E
7	Val Vert <—> Prilly, Galicien/Arena	E
8	Le Mont-sur-Lausanne, Grand-Mont <—> Pully, gare	E
9	Prilly, église <—> Lutry, corniche	E
13	Montbenon <—> Verdeil	E
16	Provence nord <—> Grand-Vennes	E
17	Lausanne, flon <—> Villars-sainte-croix, Croix-Péage	E
18	Clochatte <—> Crissier, Timonet	E
19	Chauderon <—> Renens, 14 avril	E
20	Blécherette <–> Lausanne, gare	E
21	Blécherette <—> Paudex, Verrière	E
23	Rouvraie <—> Le Mont-sur-Lausanne, Maillefer	E
24	Bourdonnette <–> Tour Haldimand-Lac	E
25	Chavannes, Glycines <—> Pully, gare	E
31	Renens, gare sud <—> St-Sulpice, Venoge sud	E
32	Villars-sainte-croix, En Coulaye/Mex, Faraz <—> Prilly, Galicien	E
33	Prilly, Mont Goulin <—> St-Sulpice, Venoge nord	E
36	Renens, gare nord <—> Crissier, Closalet	E
38	Renens, avenir <—> Prilly, église	E
41	Montolieu <—> Sallaz	E
42	Sallaz <—> Foyer	E
45	Epalinges, Bois-Murat <—> Chalet-à-Gobet	E
46	Epalinges, Bois-Murat <—> Epalinges, Ballègue	E
47	Pully, port <—> Grandvaux, Pra Grana	E
48	Pully, Daillettes <—> Pully, gare	E
49	Belmont, Grands-Champs <—> Pully, Clergère	E
64	Epalinges, Croisettes <—> Lausanne, Vuliette	E
68	Lutry, Croix-sur-Lutry <–> Lutry, gare	E
69	Lutry, Landar <–> Lutry, port	E

== Regional lines ==
Lines	Endpoints
35	Bussigny, gare <–> Bussigny, Riettaz	E
54	Renens, gare nord <–> Le Mont-sur-Lausanne, Grand-Mont	E
56	Bussigny, gare <–> Mex, Faraz	E
58	Bussigny, gare <–> Cossonay-Penthalaz, gare	E
60	Froideville-Laiterie <–>Riponne-M.-Béjart	E

== See also ==
- Lausanne Metro
- Public transport in the Lausanne Region
