= Transports publics de la région lausannoise =

Swiss transport company

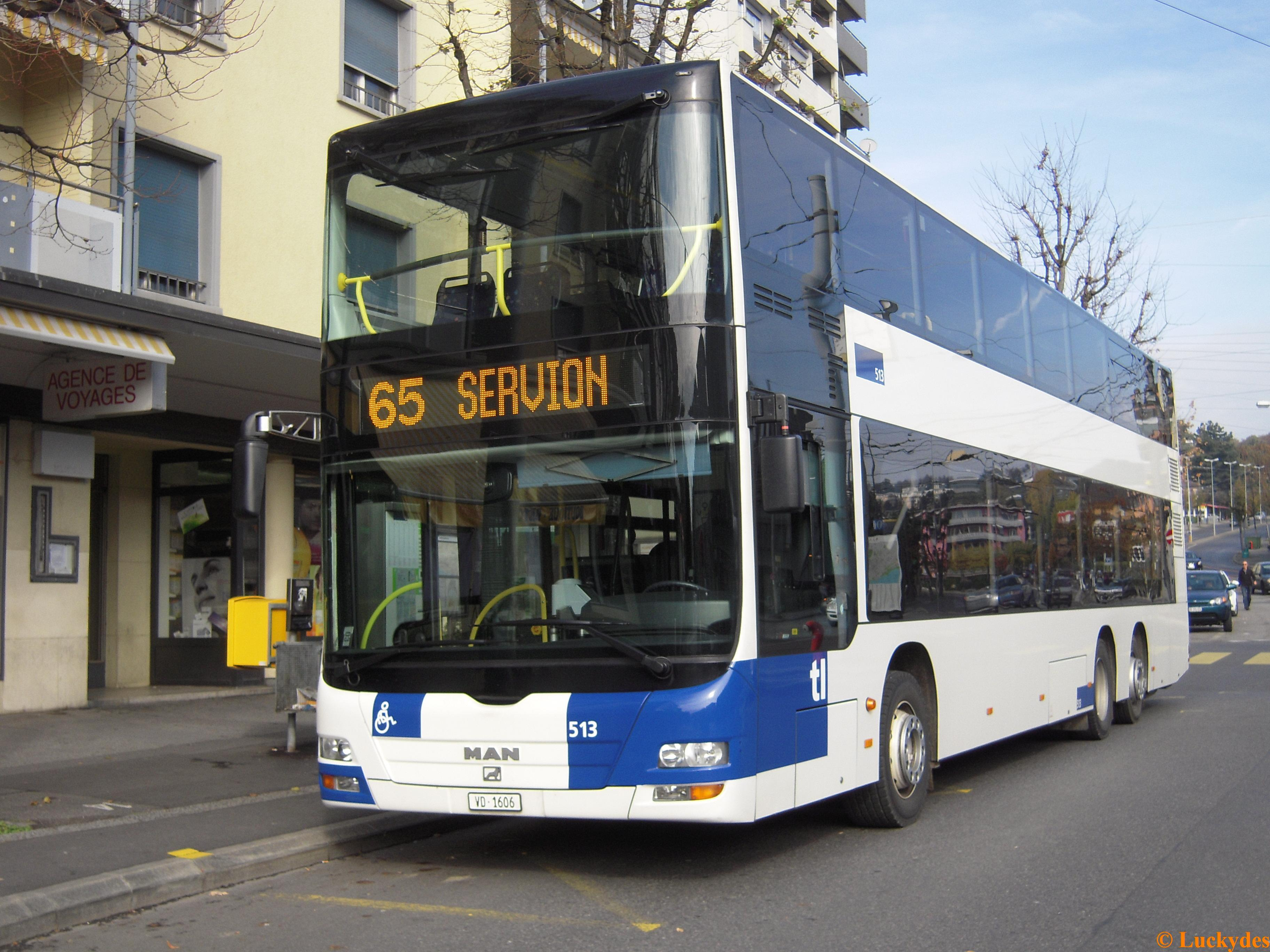
- TL operates double-decker buses on some longer-distance routes
- Formerly: Tramways Lausannois
- Founded: 1894
- Locale: Lausanne, Vaud, Switzerland
- Service area: Lausanne and environs
- Service type: Métro, Trolleybus, Diesel bus, Tramway
- Routes: 252 km (157 mi) network: 2 Metro lines • 10 trolleybus routes • 29 others
- Destinations: • Ouchy • Renens • Épalinges • Lutry • outlying towns
- Hubs: Lausanne Flon, Lausanne CFF, St-François
- Stations: 48 (Métro)
- Fleet: TL Bem 4/6 • MP 89 • various road vehicles
- Fuel type: Electricity, Diesel
- Director: Patrica Solioz Mathys (2020-)
- Website: t-l.ch (in French)

Transports publics de la région lausannoise, often abbreviated simply to tl, are the main operator of public transport in Lausanne and the wider agglomeration. As of 2012, TL operates the Lausanne trolleybus system (a network of 10 trolleybus routes), 25 conventional bus routes and two metro lines, using more than 290 vehicles. TL operates weekend night services and demand responsive transport.

== History ==
The history of the company is linked to the local railways. Its name was Tramways Lausannois until 1963, when it was changed to the present one, Transports publics de la région lausannoise. Its origins can be traced back to the Lausanne–Ouchy Railway - a former funicular, which operated with several changes until 2006. That route was closed to make way for the new Métro line.

=== Switzerland's first funicular ===
Lausanne was reached by the railway in 1858, but Lausanne railway station was built neither in the town centre nor in the port of Ouchy. Lausanne city authorities moved to connect the station to both these districts, and the Federal Council granted a concession to run a railway line between Lausanne and Ouchy in 1871.

The line was built by the Lausanne-Ouchy (LO) Railway Company, established in 1874, as a funicular - the first in Switzerland. Service began on the line on 15 March 1877, and on 5 December 1879 a separate line from Lausanne station to the town centre, the Lausanne-Gare (LG) was commissioned, meaning both districts were connected to the station.

=== Lausanne Corporation Tramways ===
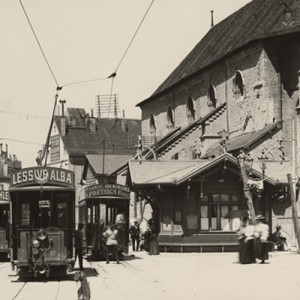
Lausanne tram at the Saint-François stop, either 1896 or 1897.

Plans were laid for a tram network in 1894, and Lausanne Corporation tramways, or Société des tramways lausannois (in French), as the current transport network was called. The electricity used to power the future network was produced by the Couvaloup plant, built in 1895, also where the first tramcars were stabled.

The first rails were laid on 1 March 1896 and the network was inaugurated by 29 August. Regular operations started on 1 December 1896, except the Pontaise line whose opening was delayed until 25 December due to additional safety tests.

The tram network grew; several lines were created and others extended. The first depot-workshop was built at Prélaz between 1898 and 1900 to accommodate the new cars. The Jorat Regional Electric Railway Company - or Compagnie des Chemins de fer électriques régionaux du Jorat (in French) merged with TL in 1910, allowing them to double the length of their network and use the electricity power station at Mézières and a depot in Epalinges.

=== Gradual decline of the tram ===
In 1929, TL began their first bus service, followed in 1931 by the first modern trolleybus in Switzerland, on a route between Lausanne railway station and Ouchy. It led to the closure of the tram line between Closelet and Epinettes, which was not as suitable due to higher costs and the steep slope, meaning low speed and heavy use of brakes. The pioneering trolleybus is now preserved by the Trolleybus Association "Rétrobus" in Geneva.

The tram network began to decline from 1933, when it was at its largest extent of 66 km (41 mi). The success of the Ouchy trolleybus experiment meant a further 32 vehicles were ordered, and this led to five tram lines being abandoned between 1938 and 1939, to be replaced by trolleybuses.

== The bus takes over ==
In 1962, 60 years after the Jorat network started, the majority of tram routes closed and were replaced by buses, but the most heavily used routes were converted to trolleybuses, and the Lausanne trolleybus system has long been the largest in Switzerland in term of network size. The last Lausanne tram ran in 1964 between Renens and Rosiaz, but additional trolleybus vehicles are in service for the 1964 National Exhibition.

For details of the bus lines, see List of Bus Lines in Lausanne.

== Tramway ==
A 4.6 km (2.9 mi) long tram line linking Lausanne to Renens is under construction, and is planned to open in late 2026. It will be the first standard gauge tram line in Switzerland. Stadler Rail has received a contract for the delivery of ten Tramlink low-floor tram vehicles.

== The metro is created ==
In 1984, the City of Lausanne took over the 110-year-old Compagnie du Chemin de Fer du Lausanne-Ouchy (in French), granting management to TL. Shortly afterwards, in 1991, the Tramway du Sud-Ouest lausannois (TSOL) was opened, with TL operating the light rail services. This was later branded Line M1.

By the end of the decade, a plan for the future of the Lausanne-Ouchy route was put together. The idea, to replace the rack railway with a fully-fledged metro, went to a public vote in 2002. Work started to clear land for a new line north from the centre of Lausanne on 12 February 2004, with the first stone laid in June. Once the Lausanne-Ouchy line ceased running in 2006, work began to rebuild that route as part of the new line. Lausanne Metro Line M2 started operating in October 2008.

=== Network changes ===
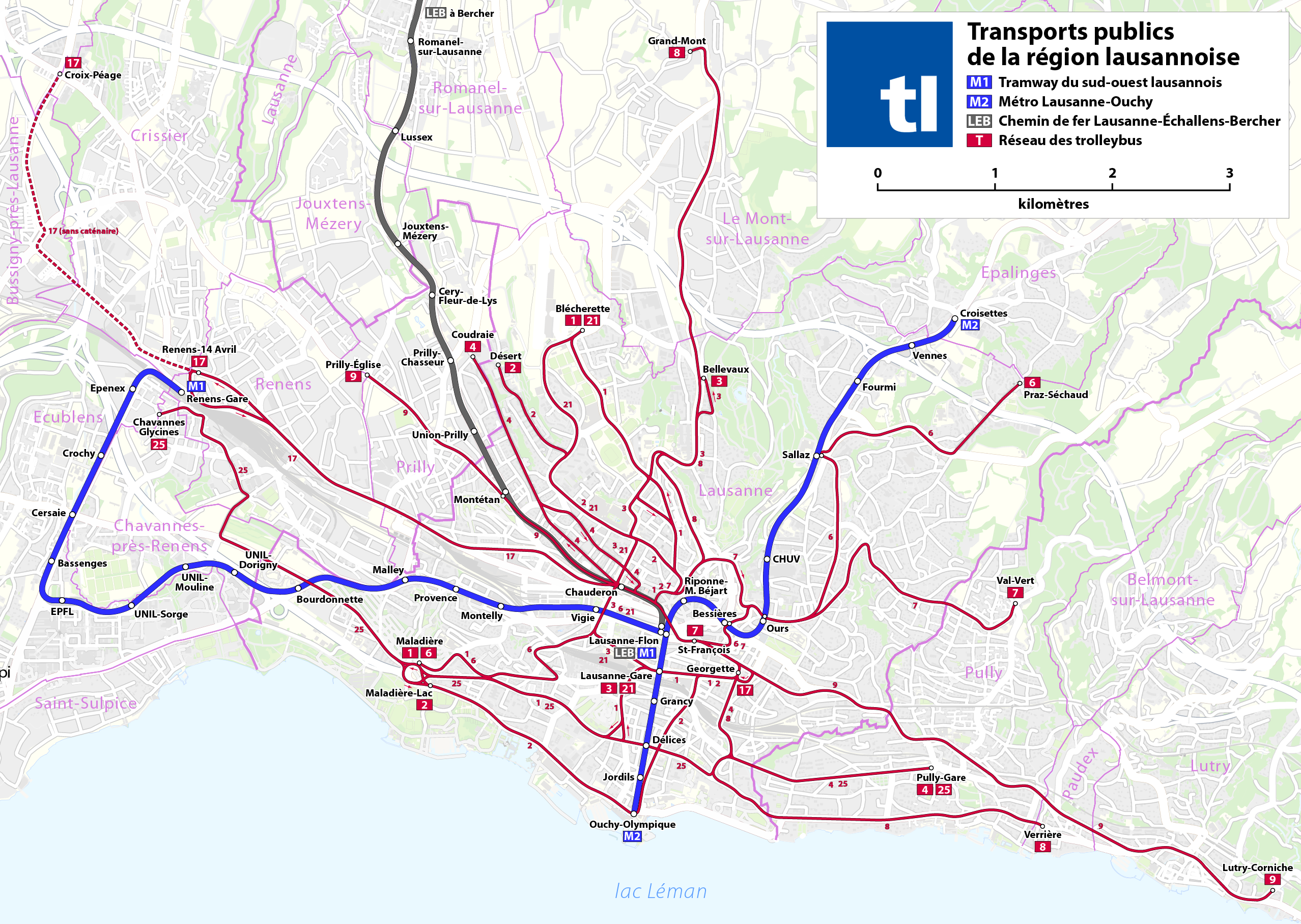

==== Réseau 08 ====
The commissioning of the second Métro line led to a major change to the bus network. Network 08 or "Réseau 08" (in French), commonly abbreviated "R08", led to shorter journey times and more direct connections, allowing for changes to movement prompted by the new underground line. Many lines were made to connect with rail stations, including the existing m1, CFF and LEB to give easier movement between the station, the centre and north of the city. The cost of work for "Network 08" was CHF 21 million (excluding work on the Sallaz site).

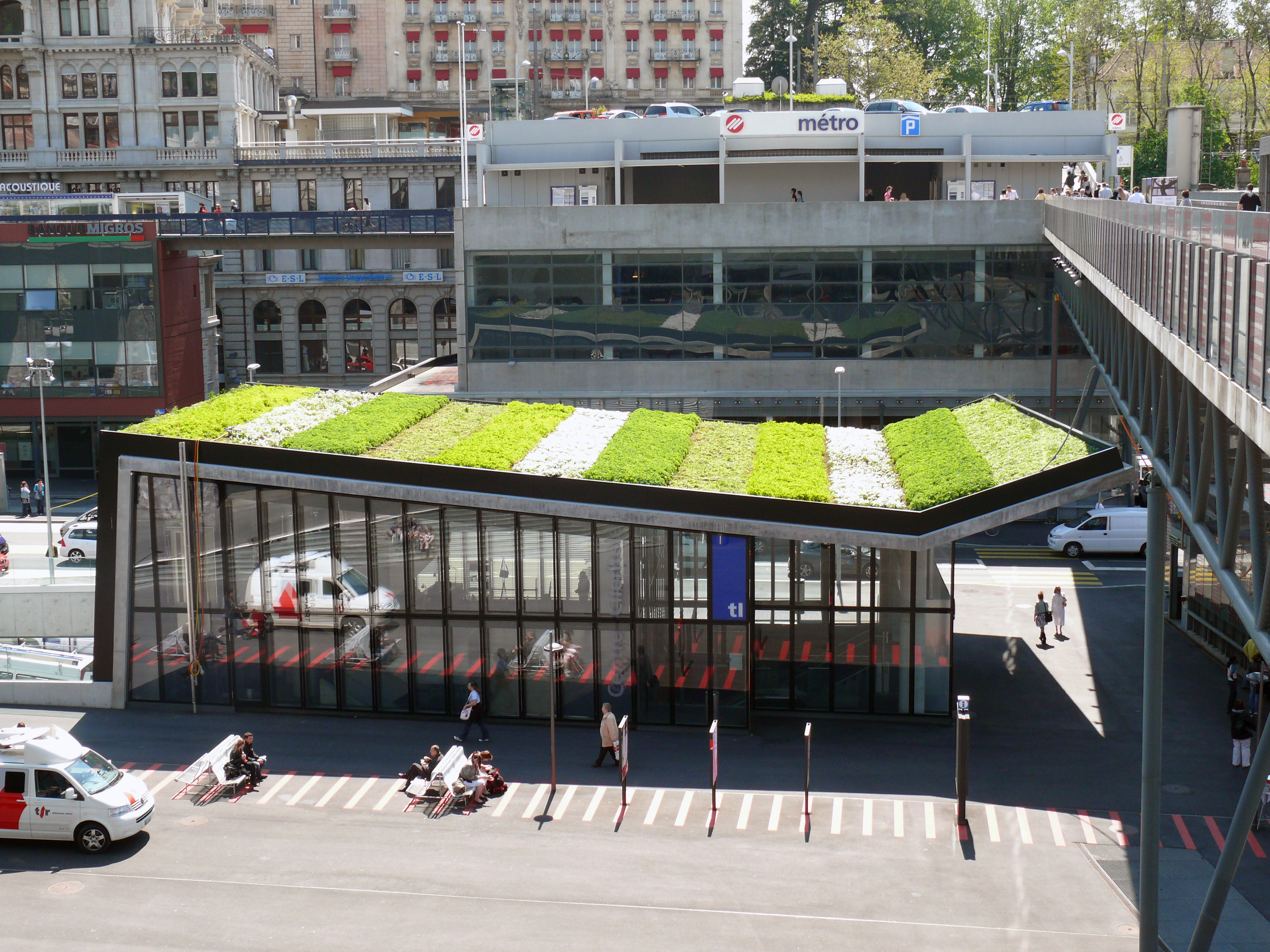
TL information and sales kiosk at Lausanne-Flon.

Among the changes were the creation of hubs at locations such as Lausanne-Flon station where a new TL information and sales kiosk was built, replacing the previous one at nearby Place St. François. The building has a green wall covering 200 m^{2} (2,200 sq ft) and 600 m^{2} (6,500 sq ft) turf roof, with a rainwater recovery system.

Three bus routes were completely withdrawn, as they were effectively replaced by the new metro line, with 6 new ones created.

==== Réseau 10 ====
Two years later, there were some changes to bring in Network 10 or "Réseau 10" (in French), actually introduced on 13 December 2009. As of that change, there are 2 metro lines and 35 bus routes, made up from 10 urban trolleybus services, 20 urban bus routes and 5 regional bus routes. The whole network, with a length of 251.9 km (156.5 mi), serves 274,380 inhabitants. M2 is the busiest route, with more than 55,000 passengers transported per day, followed by the M1 with 43,500 passengers per day during university terms. The busiest TL bus route is the number 7 with 31,200 passengers daily.

== Publications ==
TL publishes a monthly magazine called banc dealing with the news about the public transport network around Lausanne. Copies are distributed at metro stations and ticket agencies.

== See also ==
- Transport in Switzerland
- List of bus operating companies in Switzerland
