= Finishing school (disambiguation) =

Finishing school is a type of private school for girls that emphasizes cultural studies and prepares its students especially for social activities.

Finishing school may also refer to:

== Films ==
- Finishing School (1934 film), American romantic drama directed by George Nichols, Jr.
- Finishing School (1953 film), Italian romantic comedy directed by Bernard Vorhaus; also known as Luxury Girls; original title Fanciulle di lusso
- The Finishing School (film), 1969 Spanish horror feature directed by Narciso Ibáñez Serrador

== Literature ==
- The Finishing School (Spark novel), 2004 novella by Scottish writer Muriel Spark
- The Finishing School, 1984 novel by American writer Gail Godwin
- The Finishing School, 2005 book by American writer Dick Couch
- Finishing School (series), a four-book young adult steampunk series by American writer Gail Carriger

== Music ==
- The Finishing School, a band/project by musician Sasha Bell of Essex Green and The Ladybug Transistor

== Other ==
- Finishing school (India), supplementary training school
