= The Finishing School (Spark novel) =

2004 novel by Muriel Spark

- First edition (UK)
- Author: Muriel Spark
- Cover artist: Andy Bridge
- Language: English
- Publisher: Viking Press (UK); Doubleday (US)
- Publication date: 2004
- Publication place: United Kingdom
- Media type: Print, Audio, eBook
- Pages: 160
- ISBN: 0-670-91173-9

The Finishing School is the last novel written by British author Muriel Spark and published by Viking Press in 2004. It concerns 'College Sunrise', a mixed-sex finishing school in Ouchy on the banks of Lake Geneva near Lausanne in Switzerland.

== Plot ==
The school is run by Rowland Mahler and his wife Nina Parker. Rowland is trying to write a novel but discovers that a new star pupil, Chris Wiley, only seventeen is also writing a novel, which eclipses Rowland's efforts. Frustrated by his own inability to make progress, and increasingly aware of Chris' prodigious talent, Rowland becomes obsessed with the boy, occasioning dry ironies about twists in human relations. Chris recognises this and keeps his novel under wraps whilst at the same time encourages his attention, increasing Rowland's frustration.
