= Lausanne Metro Line M2 =

Transit line in Lausanne, Switzerland

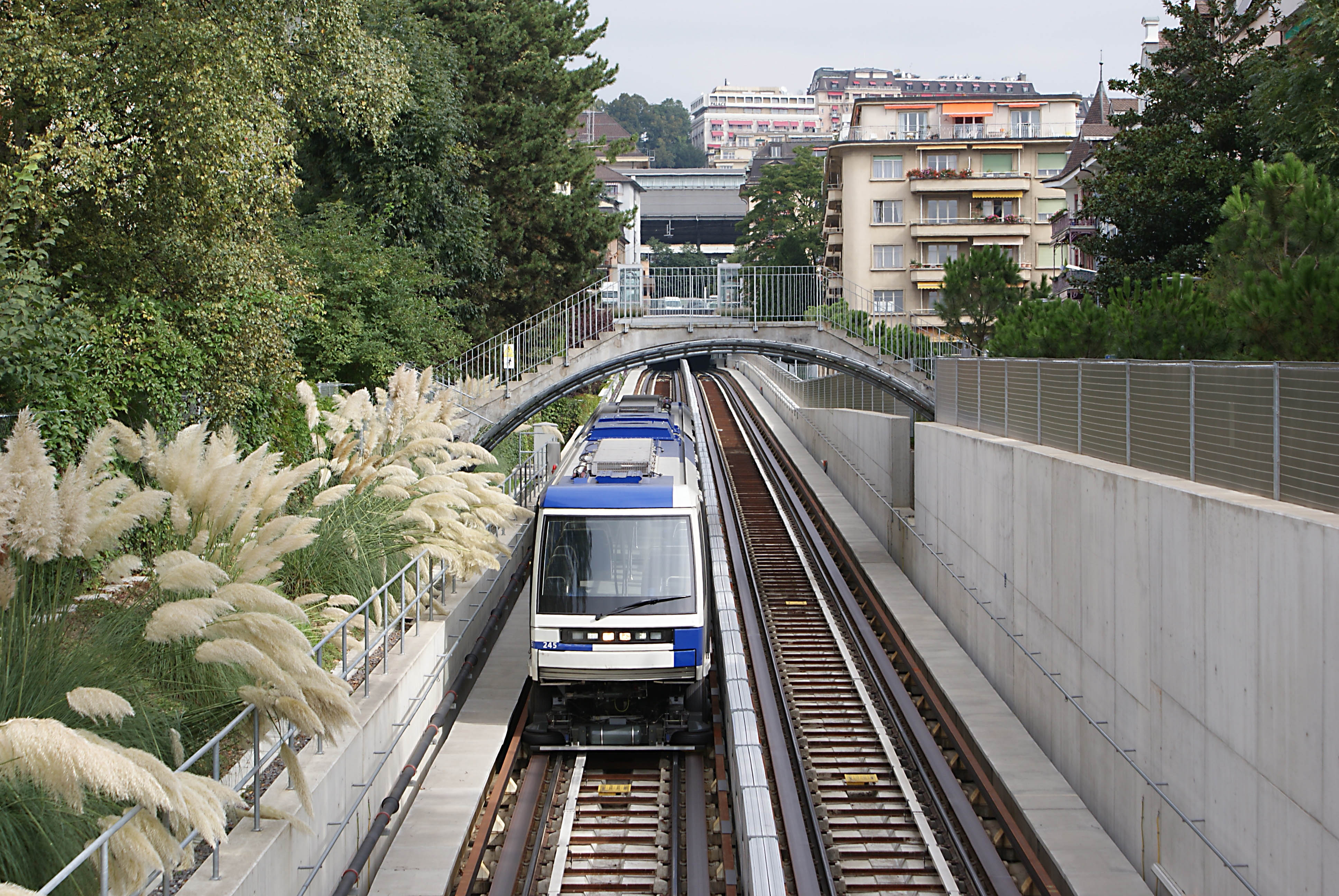
- A Line M2 train near Grancy station

Overview
- Locale: Vaud, Switzerland
- Termini: Ouchy; Les Croisettes
- Stations: 14

Service
- Type: Rubber-tyred metro
- System: Lausanne Metro
- Operator: TL
- Rolling stock: 18 2-car MP 89 TL trains
- Daily ridership: 75,615 (average, 2013)
- Ridership: 31.5 million (2018); 28 million (2014); 27.6 million (2013)

History
- Opened: 2008; 18 years ago

Technical
- Line length: 5.9 km (3.7 mi)
- Track gauge: 1,435 mm (4 ft 8 1/2 in) standard gauge with running pads for the rubber tired wheels outside of the steel rails

Lausanne Metro Line M2 is a metro line which runs between Ouchy-Olympique and Croisettes. The second line of the Lausanne Metro, it is 5.9 kilometres (3.7 mi) long and uses the alignment of the former Lausanne-Ouchy railway, plus a new route towards Epalinges, crossing the whole city of Lausanne from north to south. Construction work (including enabling works) took around 4 years, and brought significant rebuilds of all former Métro Lausanne-Ouchy stations, plus involved moving the platforms at Lausanne-Flon station a short distance further north to give cross-platform interchange from northbound M2 to the Lausanne-Echallens-Bercher railway. The new line opened in autumn 2008.

== Technical ==
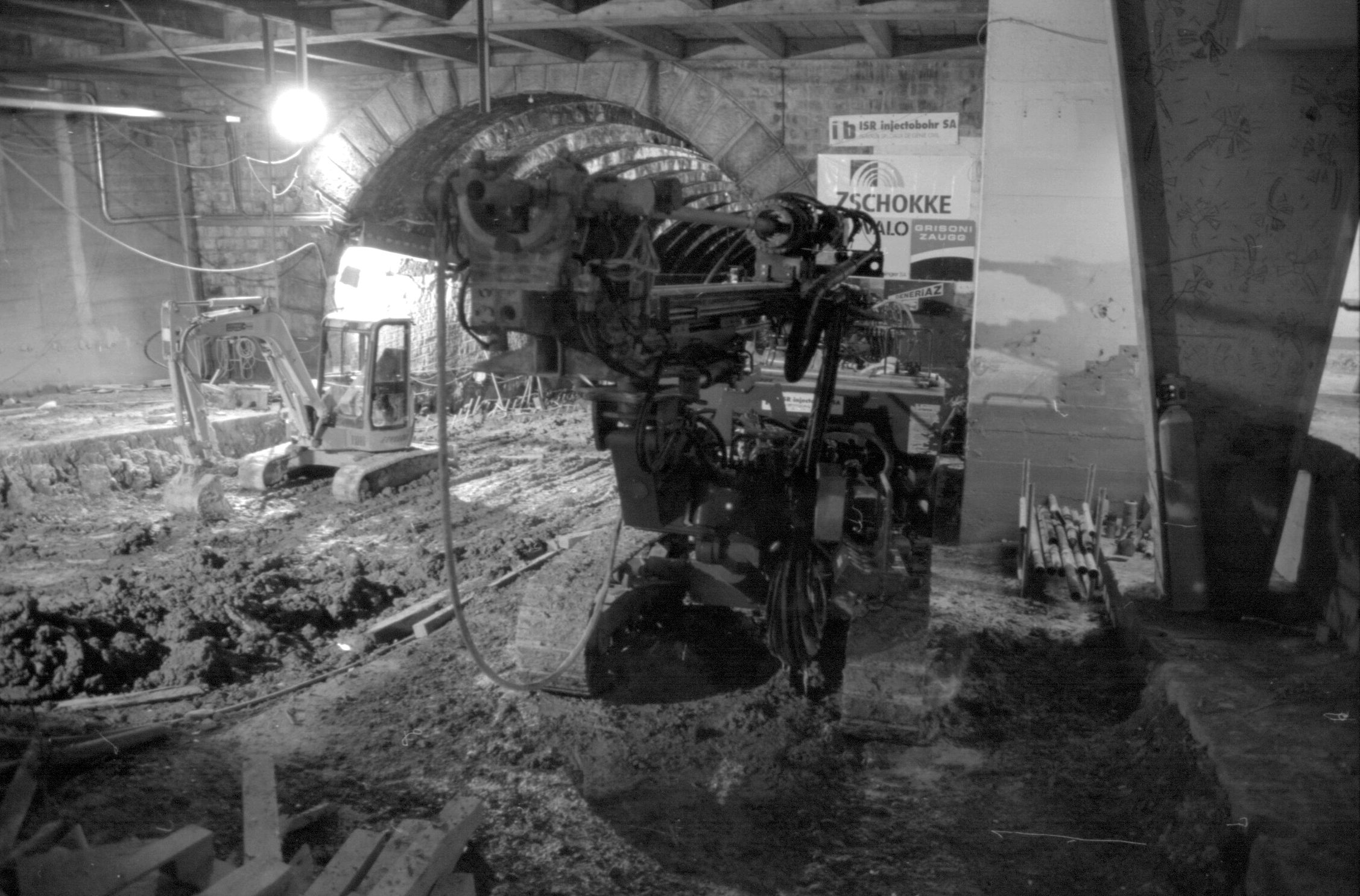
The M2 under construction on the stretch of the former Métro-Ouchy

The line is not entirely underground, but the majority (70-90%) of the system is in a tunnel. The line is steeply sloped, with an average incline of 5.7%, and as steep as 12% in some places. A rubber-tyred metro was selected to counter these, the steepest slopes of any similar adhesion-worked system in the world. The constraints in braking distance and deceleration are such that the M2 can travel faster upwards than downwards.

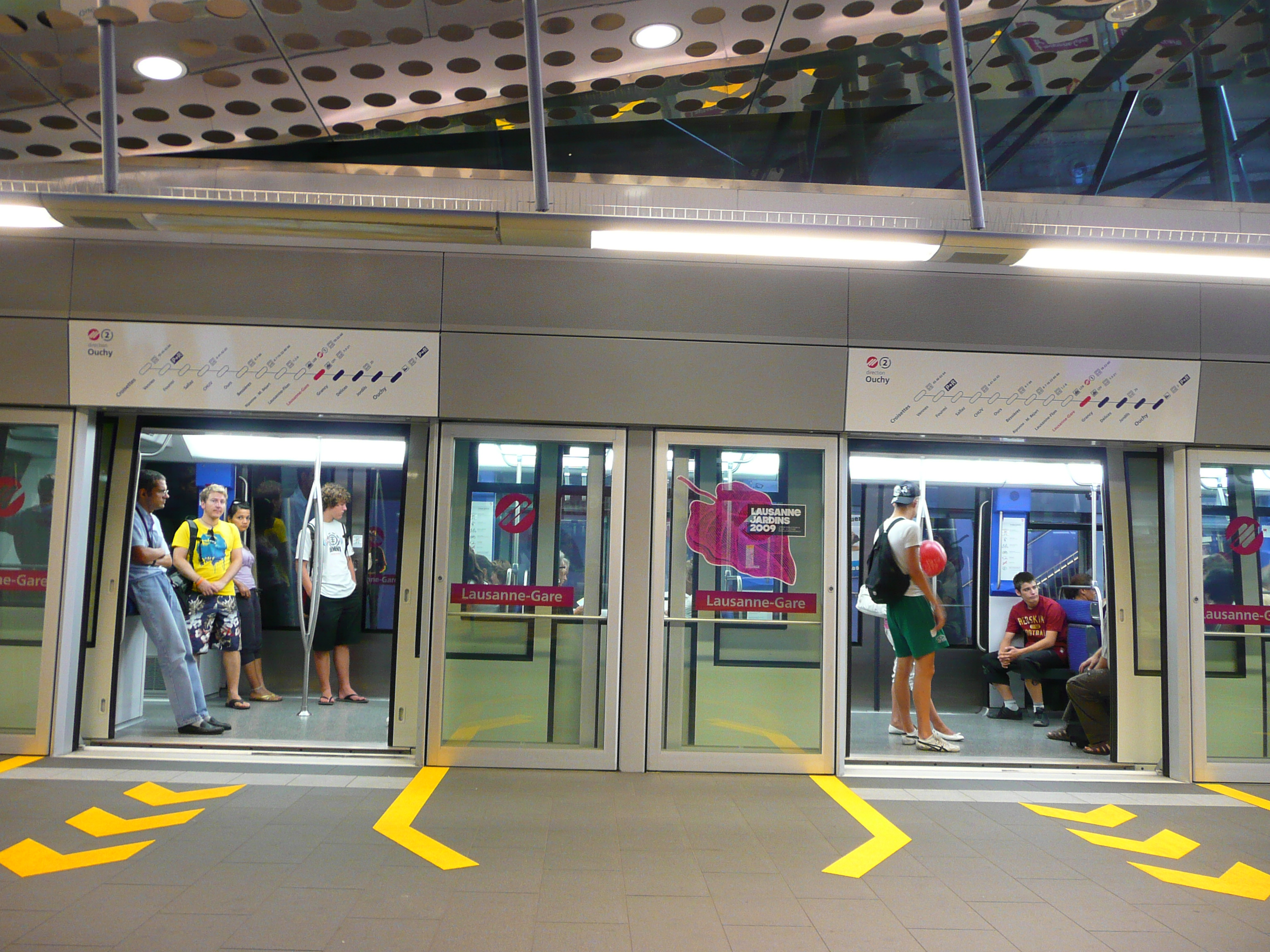
The M2 Lausanne Gare station showing one of the steeply graded platforms.

The regular passenger route is 6.5 kilometres (4.0 mi) in length from Ouchy to Epalinges, including 1.5 km (0.93 mi) of line that replaces the former Lausanne-Ouchy railway. There are 14 stations on the line, which makes a 338 m (1,109 ft) vertical gain. An additional 2 kilometres (1.2 mi) of track is contained within the depot at Vennes, along with the signalling, security and information facilities.

The line is entirely automated, managed from a central command station. This means that it is cheaper to operate than a traditional system with drivers, and more flexible during peak hours. The stations are equipped with platform screen doors and dedicated station personnel are on hand to assist passengers. In contrast with Line M1, trains also run on a totally separate right of way, meaning there is no conflict between the surface traffic and the metro, enhancing safety and reliability compared to a tramway. All new sections of the route were built as double track, plus the reused Lausanne-Ouchy alignment was also rebuilt as double-track, with the exception of the tunnel under the CFF station due to high costs. This leads to increased capacity and less potential for knock-on delays.

=== Performance ===
The line opened in 2008 with a designed capacity of 25 million passengers/year, but exceeded this with 27.6 million by 2013, and 28 million in 2014. As of February 2015, overcrowding is now a significant problem, and the state has granted significant funds towards a programme which will improve capacity by running extra trains and building additional tracks. Patronage has continued to rise, with 31.5 million passengers carried in 2018.

Trains travel up to every 3 minutes between the main railway station and Sallaz, with trains every 6 minutes along the rest of the line. The trains travel with a top service speed of 60 km/h (37 mph), taking 18 minutes to travel the full length of the line. The line was designed for up to 6,600 passengers/hour in each direction.

In 2026, Alstom was awarded a contract to automate the line.

== Stations ==
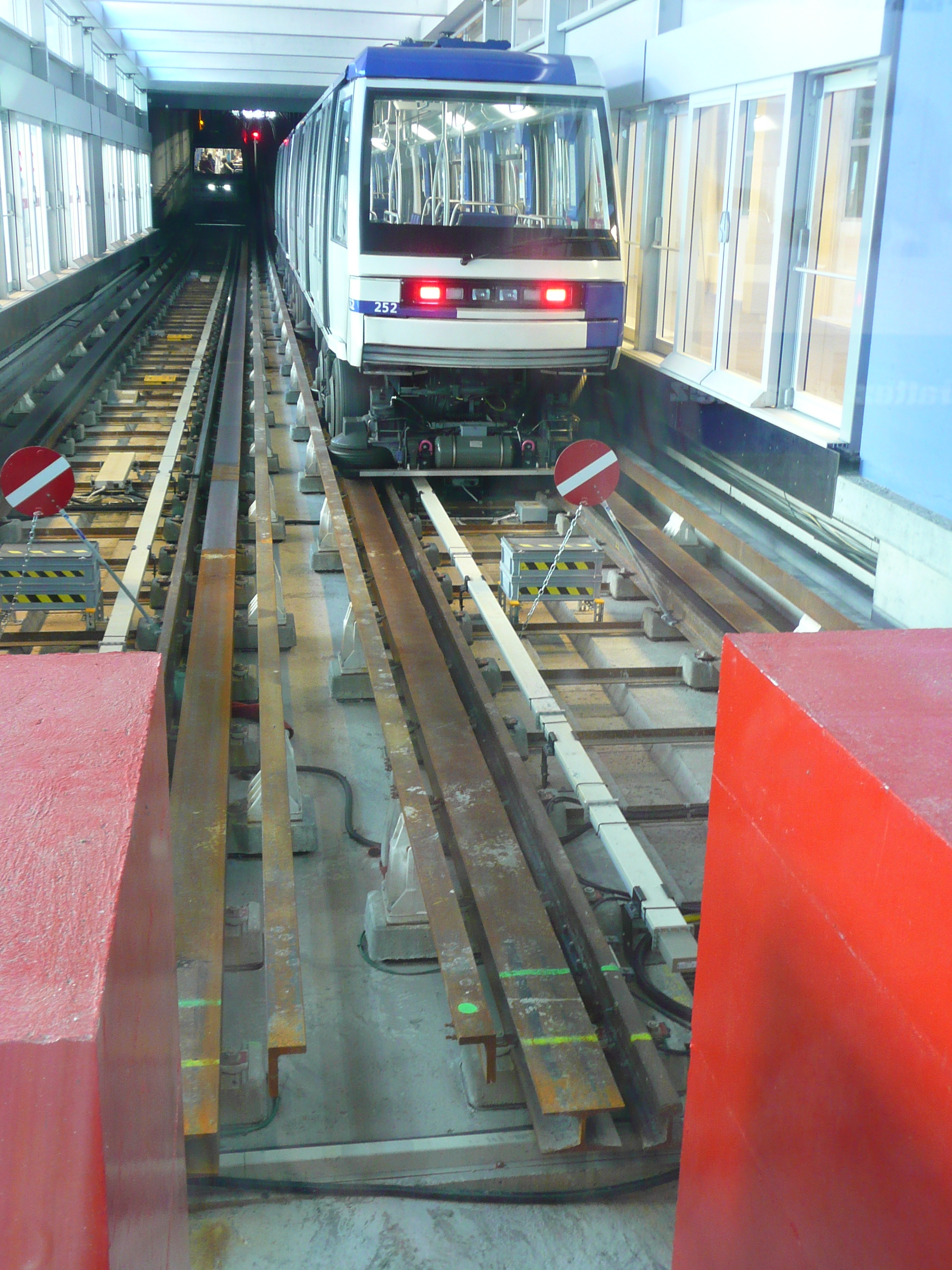
Ouchy M2 station, showing a train stabled on a closed platform 'not in use' and another train approaching in the distance. As this station is the end of line, the track end, is also visible.

Route of the M2

The underground stations are located as close as possible to the surface. They are equipped with stairs, lifts and facilities for handicapped people. The Lausanne slopes have been used to create multi-level access, make ramp access easier and take advantage of natural light as much as possible. At Lausanne-Flon, there are connections to Metro Line M1 and the R20 service of leb. At Lausanne railway station, the line connects to regional train services of RER Vaud and long-distance trains of Swiss Federal Railways (CFF) and TGV Lyria.

Station	Altitude	New/existing	Situation	Stopping time	Connections
Ouchy–Olympique	373 m (1,224 ft)	existing	Outdoors	70 sec	
Jordils	392 m (1,286 ft)	existing	Outdoors	25 sec	
Délices	408 m (1,339 ft)	new	Indoors	25 sec	
Montriond	420 m (1,378 ft)	deleted	Outdoors	-	
Grancy	425 m (1,394 ft)	new	Outdoors	25 sec	
Lausanne railway station	451 m (1,480 ft)	existing	Underground	35 sec	R1 R2 R3 R4 R5 R6 R9
Lausanne-Flon	473 m (1,552 ft)	existing	Underground	35 sec	Lausanne Metro Line M1 Lausanne–Echallens–Bercher railway
Riponne - Maurice Béjart	492 m (1,614 ft)	new	Underground	35 sec	
Bessières	500 m (1,640 ft)	new	Underground	25 sec	
Ours	517 m (1,696 ft)	new	Underground	35 sec	
CHUV	570 m (1,870 ft)	new	Underground	35 sec	
Sallaz	610 m (2,001 ft)	new	Indoors	35 sec	
Fourmi	651 m (2,136 ft)	new	Underground	25 sec	
Vennes	683 m (2,241 ft)	new	Underground	25 sec	
Croisettes	711 m (2,333 ft)	new	Underground	70 sec	

== Rolling stock ==
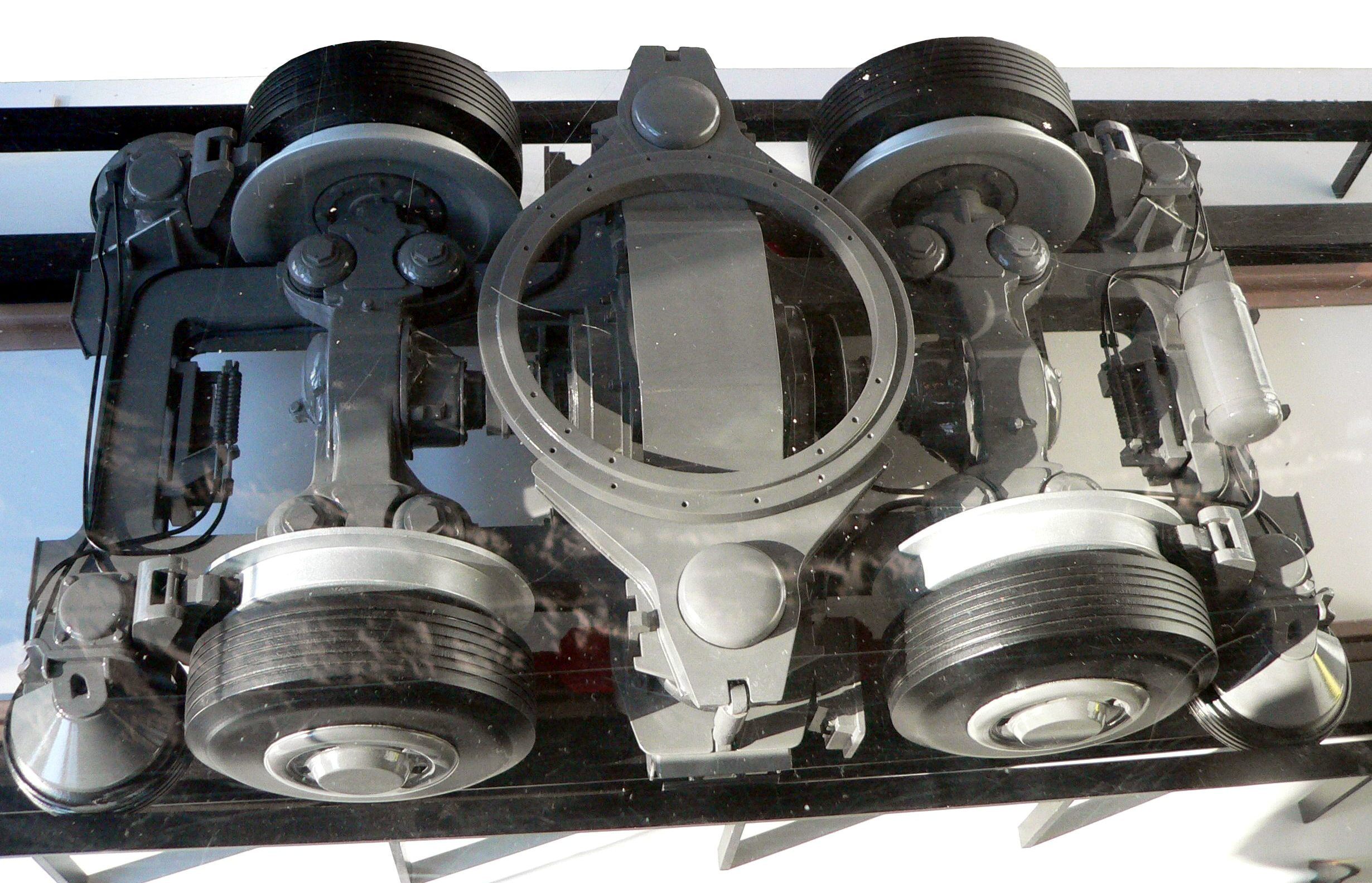
Mockup of a bogie of a M2 train

- Articulated vehicles with 4 powered bogies.
- 15 two-car trainsets.
- 222 passengers, 62 seated.
- Rubber-tyred metro with lateral guidance based on the MP 89 from Paris Métro.
- Fully automated (CBTC Alstom Urbalis 300).

=== Technical data of the trains ===
- Length of a train : 30,680 mm (100 ft 7 7/8 in)
- Length of a car : 15,340 mm (50 ft 3 15/16 in)
- Width of a car : 2,450 mm (8 ft 7/16 in)
- Height of the car to ground level: 3,470 mm (11 ft 4 5/8 in)
- Mass of an empty train : 57,316 kg (126,360 lb)
- Mass of a train at maximum load (4 p/m^{2}) : 72,856 kg (160,620 lb) (^{1})
- Width of the access doors : 1,650 mm (5 ft 4 15/16 in)
- Height of the access doors : 1,900 mm (6 ft 2 13/16 in)

(^{1}) Calculated with an average of 70 kg (154 lb) per passenger.

Capacity of the trains
	Number of passengers/m^{2}	Passengers per train
Nominal load	4 pax/m^{2}	222
Full load	6 pax/m^{2}	314
Maximum load	8 pax/m^{2}	406

=== Delivery of the trains ===
The first train was delivered to Lausanne on 2 March 2006 and all the other trains were delivered at a rate of two per month. When they arrived, the trains were stored in the CFF storage of Lausanne. Once the métro's depot had been completed, the vehicles were moved to the Vennes facility by the Autumn of 2006.

With the line having been over its design capacity for at least 2 years, the state granted funds for 3 additional metro trainsets in February 2015. The vehicles are being built in Valenciennes by Alstom, who also built the original fleet, and are designed to be identical to the existing rolling stock. The new vehicles, which are due to arrive in Lausanne by mid-2017, are an interim solution to raise capacity on the central section of the line. Capacity between Lausanne-gare and Sallaz stations will rise from 5,600 passengers per hour (each way) to 7,000 passengers per hour (each way) when they enter service in the last 3 months of 2017. The longer-term plan, for which funding is now also in place, involves a new double-track tunnel under the railway station.

== Accidents ==
On 23 February 2005, part of the tunnel under construction collapsed under the Saint-Laurent square in the centre of Lausanne. More than 500 m^{3} of debris (water and earth) fell into the tunnel, forming a huge fifteen metre gap. The area was completely evacuated for a few days and consolidation and geological analysis work started. A large pocket of water had not been noticed during the initial explorations.

Repair work lasted for a few months. The incident fortunately had no major consequence; nobody was in the area of the collapse which had heavily damaged a shopping mall. Part of the budget had been allocated for such risks and the deadline for the construction in December 2008 was not directly affected.

On 27 October 2006, a construction worker died from injuries. He had fallen a few days before on the construction site at the level of the entrance of the University Hospital of Lausanne (CHUV).

On 28 July 2008, a high-level manager for Alstom who had responsibility for the security system for the new lines was found hanging in the stairwell at the entrance to the Vennes station of the M2. The 45-year-old French man's death appeared to have been a suicide.

== Extensions and development ==
=== New Lausanne-Gare section ===
The state has granted funds for major development of the Métro system, with plans in place for improvement work until 2025. Development on the m2 line will also provide for the future of a line 3. Capacity improvement is currently limited to the central and northern sections of the line, because the tunnel under the main railway station is only single-track. Funding is now in place to build a new double-track tunnel under the railway station, and relocate the métro station closer to the main-line platforms. This will mean extra capacity is available on the whole line, and will leave the original tunnel and 2006 station available for the planned Line M3. As of October 2019, a further public scrutiny project is underway, and work to build the new tunnel and platforms is due to start in 2022, with the new route expected to be operational in 2027.

=== Northward extension ===
The end station Les Croisettes has been designed to allow a future extension of the line to the north towards Epalinges-Village, or even Le Chalet-à-Gobet.
