= Ouchy =

Lakeside neighbourhood in Lausanne, Switzerland

Coordinates: 46°30′25.46″N 6°37′36.35″E

Aerial view from 300 m by Walter Mittelholzer (1919)

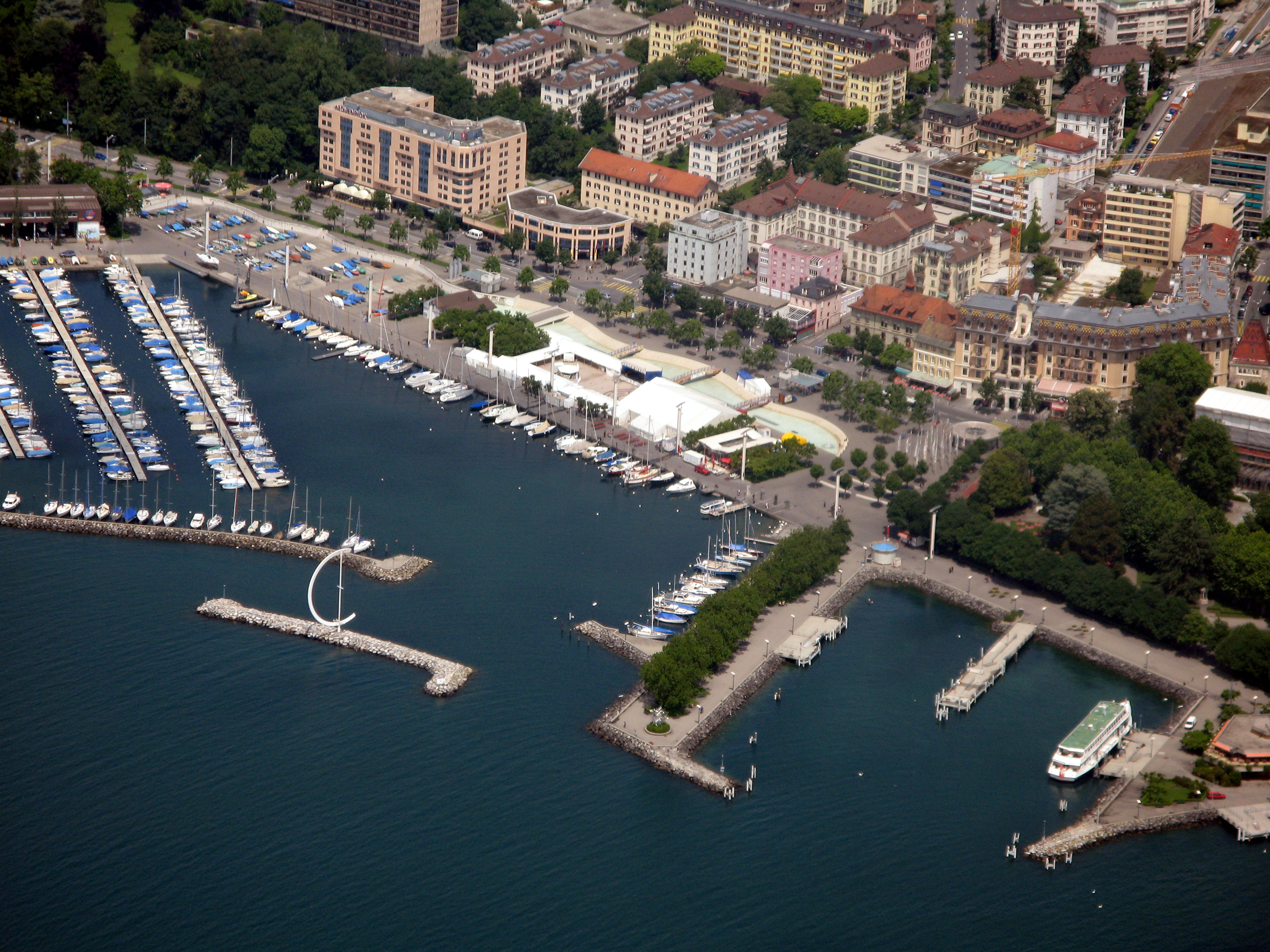
Ouchy harbour (2007)

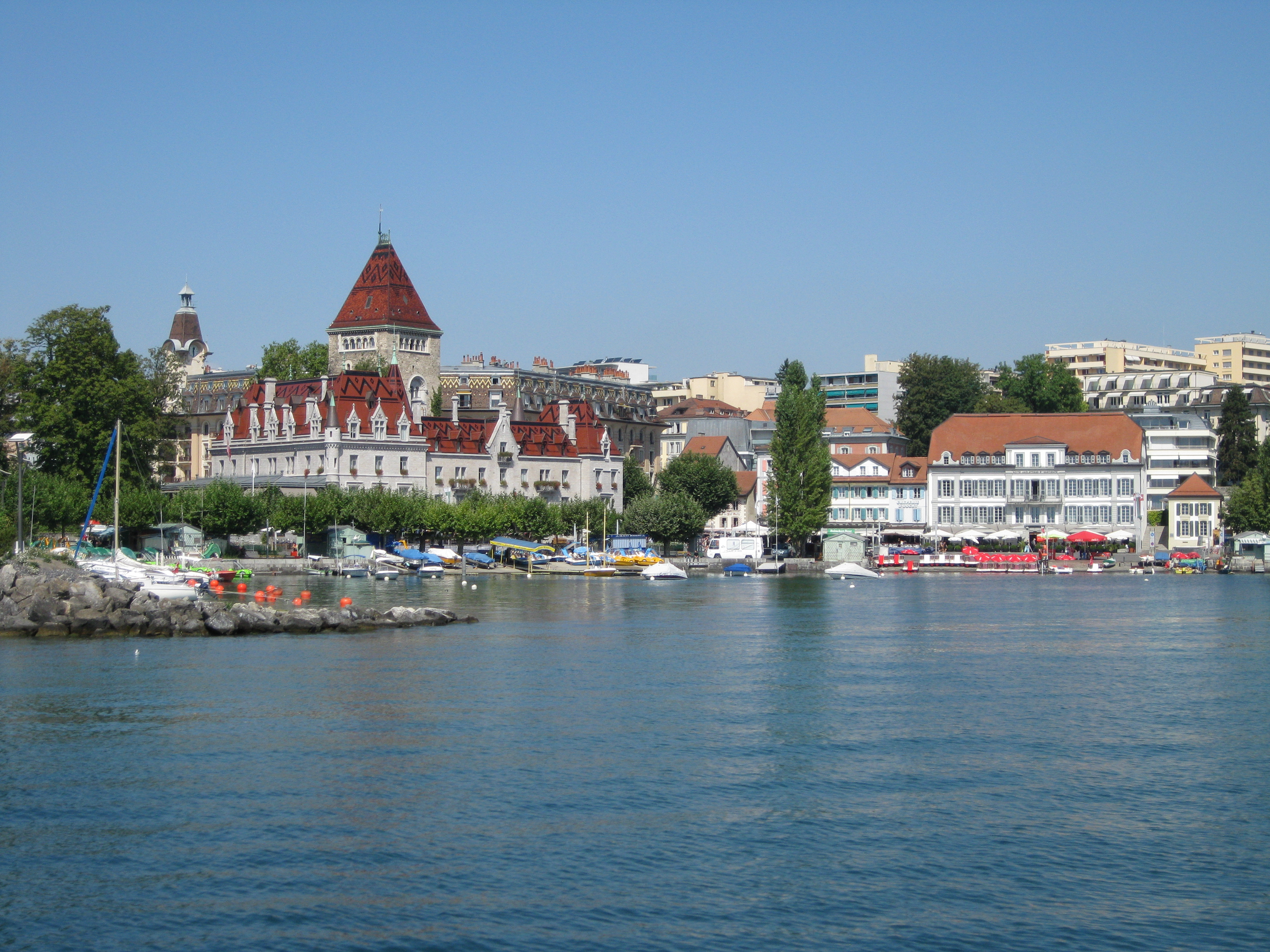
The Château d'Ouchy (2009)

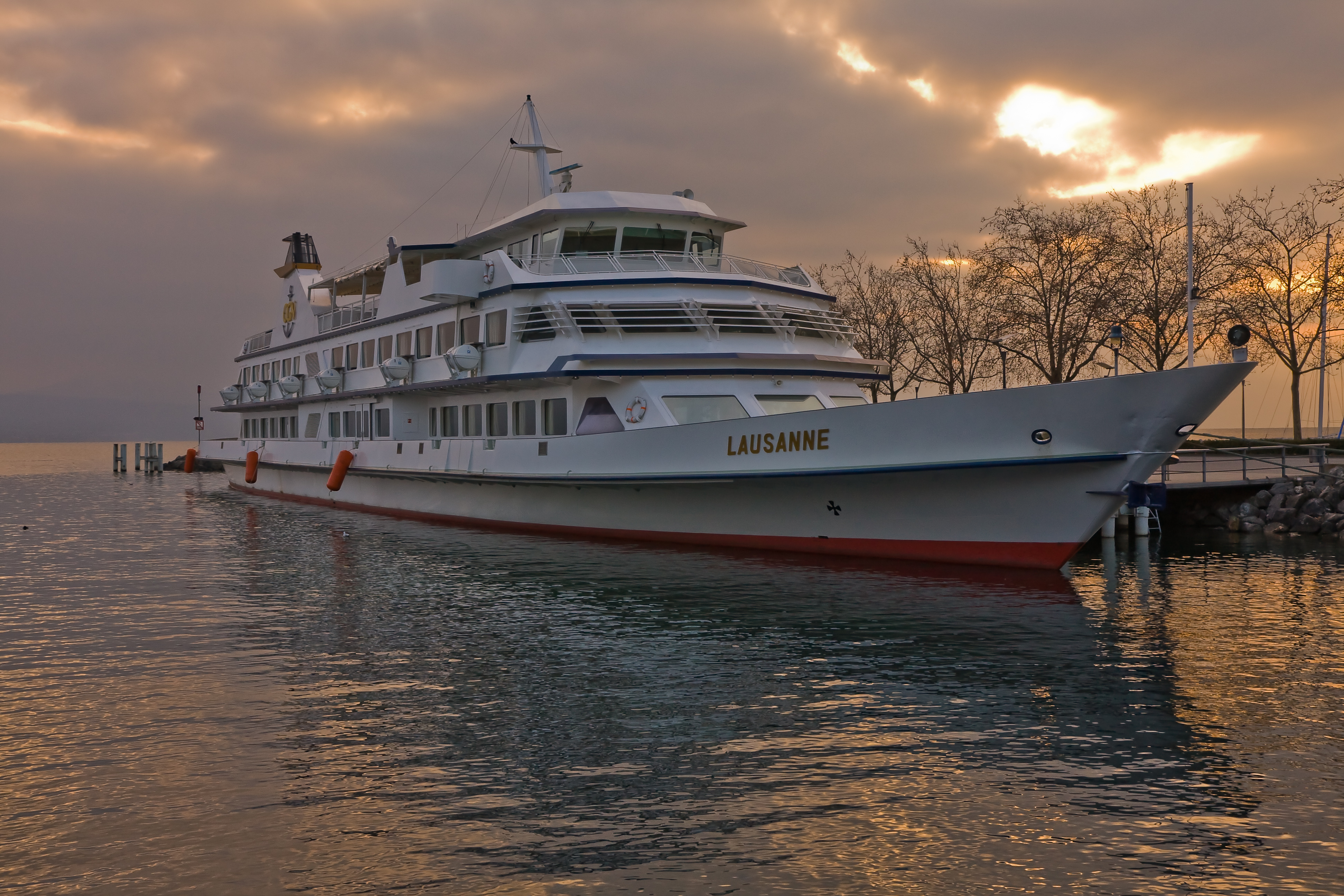
The Lausanne CGN boat in Ouchy (2007)

Ouchy (French pronunciation: [uʃi]) is a port and lakeside resort in Lausanne, Switzerland, south of the city centre, at the edge of Lake Geneva (French: le Léman). It is perhaps best known for its castle, the Château d'Ouchy.

It is served by Line M2 of the Lausanne Metro, of which it is the southern terminus.

== Facilities ==
Popular with tourists for the views of nearby France (Évian-les-Bains, Thonon), Ouchy is also an area for rollerskating (Lausanne, and Ouchy in particular, is considered a capital for this sport) and for skateboarding. The views of the lake and the Alps, and the cooler air in summer, have made Ouchy a popular place especially in the summer months.

There is a cluster of hotels – including the Beau-Rivage Palace, the Château d'Ouchy and the Mövenpick hotel – and restaurants around the port. It is served by Lausanne Metro Line M2 from Ouchy station. In 2015, the metro station "Ouchy" was renamed "Ouchy-Olympique" to mark the 100th anniversary of the installation of the International Olympic Committee in Lausanne.

The headquarters of the International Olympic Committee are at Vidy, to the west of Ouchy. The Olympic Museum and the Olympic Park (sculpture garden between the museum and the lake) are in Ouchy.

== History ==
Once a fishing village, Ouchy was incorporated into the city of Lausanne in the mid-19th century to serve as a port on Lake Geneva.

Links between the port and the city centre were improved in 1877 when Switzerland's first funicular opened. The line was converted to a rack railway in 1954, with a maintenance depot located at Ouchy station. Eventually renamed Métro Lausanne–Ouchy, the line continued operating until 2006, when it was upgraded to become Lausanne Metro Line M2.

On 18 October 1912, the First Treaty of Lausanne was signed in Ouchy between Italy and the Ottoman Empire, concluding the Italo-Turkish War.

== Sport ==
FC Stade Lausanne-Ouchy are based in Ouchy. They gained promotion to the second tier of Swiss professional football in 2019. After winning the promotion play-off in 2023, they spent one season in the Swiss Super League, before being relegated again in 2024.

== In literature ==
The plot of The Finishing School, a 2004 novel by Scottish author Muriel Spark, is set in 'College Sunrise', a finishing school located in Ouchy. In A Farewell to Arms by Ernest Hemingway, the two main characters, Lt. Frederic Henry and Catherine Barkley, take a cogwheel train into Ouchy to walk along Lake Geneva.

== See also ==
- Compagnie générale de navigation sur le lac Léman
