= Ouchy–Olympique station =

Lausanne Metro station

Ouchy–Olympique
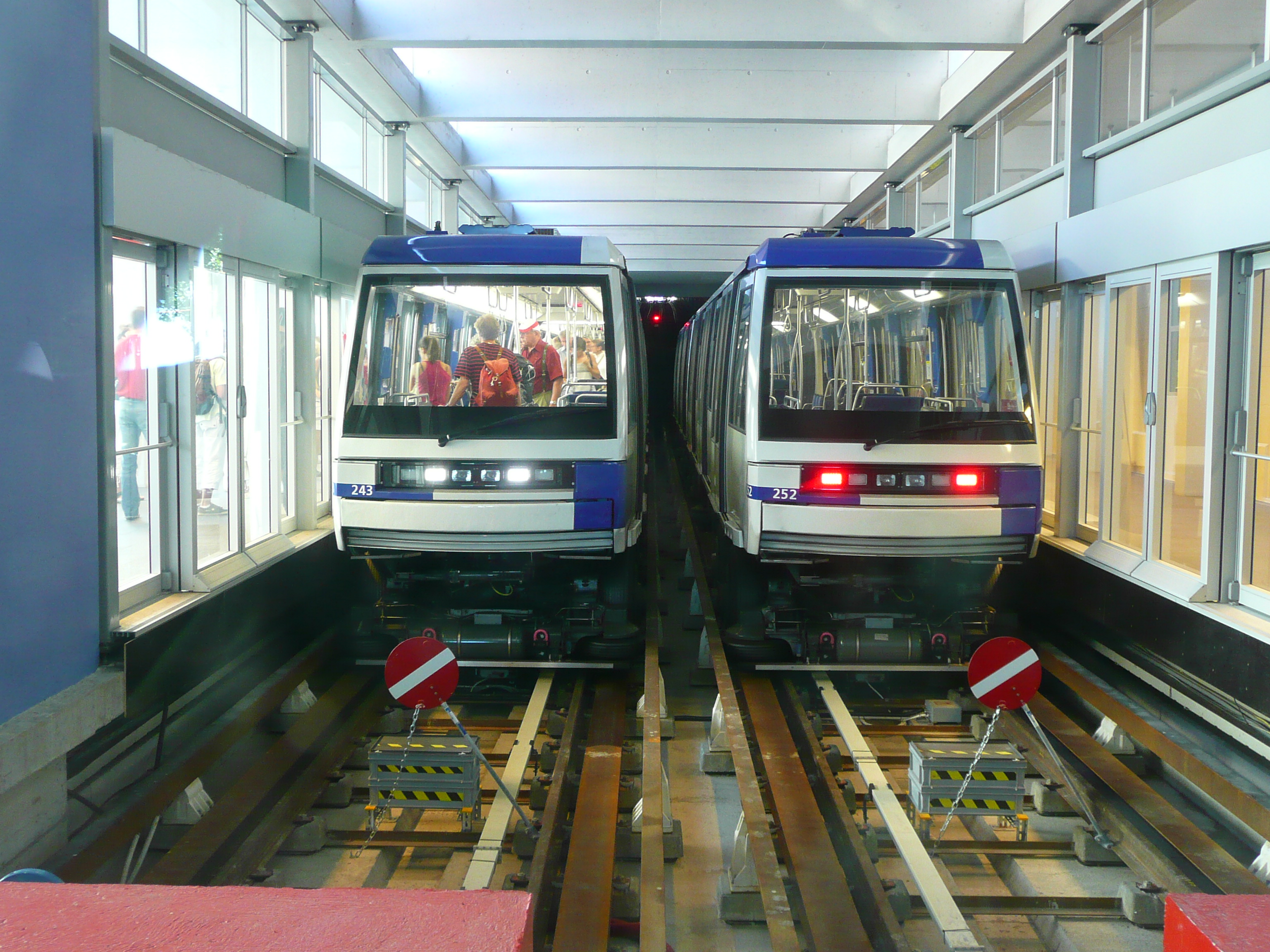

General information
- Location: Switzerland
- Coordinates: 46°30′25.9″N 6°37′35.6″E
- System: Lausanne Metro station
- Line: Line M2

History
- Opened: 27 October 2008

Services
Preceding station	Lausanne Metro	Following station
Terminus	M2	Jordils towards Croisettes
Location

Ouchy–Olympique is a Lausanne Metro station and the southern terminus of Line M2. It was opened on 27 October 2008 as part of the inaugural section of the line, from Croisettes to Ouchy-Olympique. The adjacent station is Jordils.

In 1877, a funicular between Lausanne and Ouchy was opened, which terminated at Ouchy. In 1959 the funicular was rebuilt as a rack railway. In 2003, the railway was demolished to give way for construction of M2 line. In 2008 the station was reopened at the same location as Ouchy–Olympique.
