= Croisettes station =

Lausanne Metro station

Croisettes
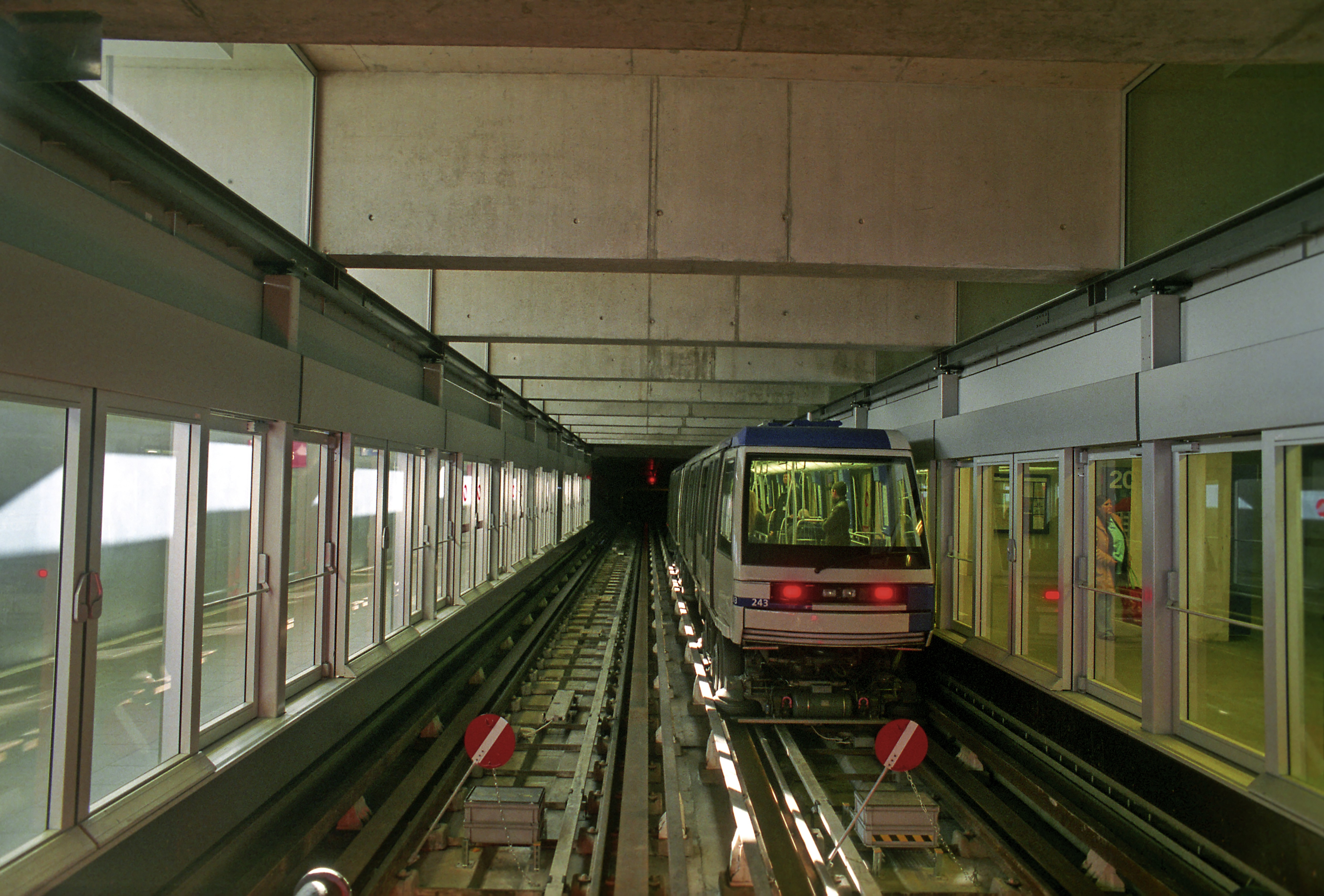
- Train at the station

General information
- Location: Épalinges; Switzerland
- Coordinates: 46°32′34″N 6°39′41″E
- System: Lausanne Metro station
- Owner: Transports publics de la région lausannoise (TL)
- Line: Lausanne Metro Line M2
- Train operators: Transports publics de la région lausannoise (TL)
- Connections: Transports publics de la région lausannoise bus lines

Other information
- Fare zone: 12 (mobilis)

History
- Opened: 27 October 2008

Services
Preceding station	Lausanne Metro	Following station
Vennes towards Ouchy-Olympique	M2	Terminus
Location

Croisettes is a Lausanne Metro station and the northern terminus of M2 line. It was opened on 27 October 2008 as part of the inaugural section of the line, from Croisettes to Ouchy–Olympique. It is located in the municipality of Épalinges. The adjacent station is Vennes.

The station has been designed to allow a future extension of the line to the north towards Epalinges-Village, or even Le Chalet-à-Gobet.
