= Métro Lausanne–Ouchy =

Railway line in Switzerland

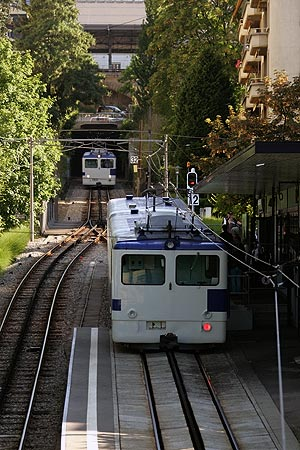
Former Lausanne-Ouchy metro photographed in June 2005.

The Métro Lausanne – Ouchy or Métro-Ouchy (LO) was a rack railway which linked the lakeside at Ouchy with Lausanne railway station and the core of the city at Flon. The system also included a parallel line between the railway station and Flon. After closure and modernisation, the line reopened in 2008 as the rubber-tired Line M2 of the Lausanne Metro which included an extension to Épalinges in the north.

== History ==
The line was opened in 1877 as the first funicular in Switzerland. The line was known as La Ficelle (The String) and used water balance as the means of raising and lowering the cars. In 1958 the funicular was rebuilt into a rack and pinion railway using the Strub system and intermediate stations at Jordils and Montriond were opened. The line became known by the name métro, although to the natives and its many regular users it was always La Ficelle.

Until 1954 there was no direct connection between the freight station of Sébeillon and the Flon valley and this line was used by freight trains from the main station to the storage area of the harbour (in Flon). The line was sold by the operating company to the town of Lausanne in 1984.

In January 2006, the line was shut down to be rebuilt into the new, fully automated, rubber-tired M2. Since the line was being rebuilt, the rack equipment was no longer needed. The trains were still in excellent condition and were sold to the French town of Villiard-de-Lans for use on their new (planned) rack railway, 'La Patache'. The trains were moved to a storage location to be overhauled for the French railway, including asbestos removal. "La Patache" was ultimately cancelled, and a new use had to be found for the trains. An idea that the locomotives and passenger cars could be used as snack booths in downtown Lausanne surfaced but even this fell through. The Swiss Transport Museum at Lucerne refused to preserve the trains. A final preservation effort by a group called "Save La Ficelle!" attempted to raise 600,000 Swiss francs, the amount needed to purchase the trains from Villiard-de-Lans. They fell several thousand francs short of the required amount. The equipment was sold to a Swiss scrap dealer and was cut up in early 2010.

The new M2 line of the Lausanne Metro opened in 2008, incorporating the original Métro Ouchy route, along with 8 entirely new stations on a new northern extension. The new line uses 15 two-car MP89CA trains, similar to those on Line 14 of the Paris Métro. The urban tunnel sections were built using "cut and cover" construction techniques, the disruption causing much anger amongst residents and commercial premises owners along its length, with much dispute and comment over the chosen route. The construction and trackwork was completed in February 2007.

Nothing remains of the original Métro-Ouchy today. The new M2 uses part of the open cut near Montriond station formerly used by the Ouchy line. Montriond station no longer exists, it was replaced with two new stations, Délices and Grancy. M2 runs above-ground between these stations. The rest of the cutting has been decked over and developed into a park, with the yard at Ouchy being redeveloped. The new line has a short single-track section between Gare CFF and Grancy where it runs through the 1877-built tunnel used by the Métro-Ouchy, before transitioning to a newly built tunnel north of Flon.

=== Timeline ===
- 1877, creation of the funicular Ouchy - CFF Station - Flon
- 1879, creation of the funicular CFF Station - Flon, parallel to the initial one
- Traction cables driven by water turbines in the top station
- 1954-1958, transformation of the line to the rack mode
- 1984, sold to the city of Lausanne
- 21 January 2006, end of the operations to allow the conversion into Metro M2 and extension to Epalinges
- 19 September 2008, inauguration of the M2 line

== Network ==
The Métro-Ouchy railway was made up of two parallel lines:

- Ouchy - Jordils - Montriond - CFF Station - Flon (Métro-Ouchy)
- CFF Station - Flon (Métro-Gare)

=== Line characteristics ===
- Ouchy - Flon
  - length 1568 yards (1482m)
  - altitude differential 106 m
  - slope 11,6%
  - train every 8 minutes
- CFF Station - Flon
  - length 318 m
  - altitude differential 37 m
  - slope 12%
  - continuous circulation without timetable

=== Technical details ===
The system consists of two lines, both single-track. The first line ran from Ouchy, through Jordils, Montriond and the SBB-CFF-FFS railway station (Gare CFF) to Flon. This is known as “Metro – Ouchy”. A second line paralleled the Métro-Ouchy from Gare CFF to Flon stations, using its own separate to one side of a double-track tunnel. This service was known as “Metro – Gare”.

The line between Ouchy and Flon is 1482 m. in length, and rises 106 m. at a maximum gradient of 11.6% ( 1 in 8.66 ). This journey is completed in 8 minutes. The system is single track with a passing track at Montriond station to allow trains to meet (See photograph). The second line from the Gare CFF to Flon is just 318 m. in length, rises 37 m. at a maximum gradient of 12% (1 in 8.33 ). The trains were two 2-car units and offered a fast service, with trains every 6 to 10 minutes. The line is now referred to as Métro-Ouchy or M2.

Ouchy station was the southern terminal of the Ouchy line. It contained 3 tracks with one platform to the east side of the easternmost track. The 2 additional tracks were used as a stabling point for trains. A switchback allowed trains to enter the maintenance facility, located in a building to the north and sightly to the west of the station. The station itself was level, as it was just before the start of the stiff 11% grade that took the mainline into the city.

Jordils station was a relatively simple affair. It consisted of a single track and a single platform to the east of the mainline. Fare control was located inside a building to the east of the platform dating back to the days of the Ouchy funicular.

Montriond station was at the halfway point of the line and contained 2 tracks and 2 platforms. The platforms and tracks were positioned rather unconventionally. Northbound (uphill) trains stopped at a proper platform, but the northbound track at the station was built into the surface of the platform to the south of the northbound platform which southbound trains stopped at. The rolling stock only had doors on the east side so this arrangement was necessary to accommodate both the passing track and the station. Such an arrangement also required the northbound train to arrive at the station before its southbound counterpart as it would block the southbound platform. On late evenings and weekends when only 1 train was service it used the northbound platform for both directions of travel. The line entered the tunnel under Lausanne just to the north of the station.

Gare CFF was the first underground station on the line. The station had 2 tracks and 2 platforms. The platform on the east side was for Lausanne-Ouchy trains and was located on the steep grade of that line. The platform on the west side of the station was used trains running the Métro-Gare service. The cars for this line only had doors on the west side and thus could not be used on the Lausanne-Ouchy. The Lausanne-Gare platform and track were not located on the steep grade of the Ouchy line, creating a level shelf next to the Ouchy track and what was essentially a 2-level station. Both tracks ascended the grade inside the 1877-built tunnel to Flon. The two lines were connected via a single crossover roughly at the halfway point of the tunnel.

==== Flon station ====
Flon was the northern terminal for both Métro Ouchy and Métro Gare trains. The underground station contained 2 tracks with 2 platforms to either side of the tracks. This station facilitated transfer to the Tramway Sud-Ouest de Lausanne (which later became Line M1 of the Lausanne Metro).

== Rolling stock and equipment ==
The trains for the Lausanne-Ouchy line consisted of 2 unpowered passenger cars and a locomotive in push-pull configuration. There were 3 rack locomotives numbered 121-123, designated He 2/2, rated at 622 hp, 6.25 m in length and weighing 18.1 tons, with a top speed of 32 km/h. They were built by Swiss Lokomotivfabirk Winterthur using electrical components from Maschienefabrik Oerlikon in 1958.

There were five unpowered passenger cars numbered 1-5, model Bt. All cars had driving controls. 3 of the cars contained segregated operator's cabs used when the locomotives were in push mode, at the rear of the train. The passenger cars, like the locomotives, were built in 1958. None of the passenger cars were equipped with pinions. The Lausanne-Gare line was always operated by a single electric railcar built to the same specifications as the locomotives but with a length of 11.9 m and a weight of 18.5 tons. The two original cars were built in 1958 and numbered 101-102. In 1975 these cars were replaced by 2 newer cars built by SIG-Oerlikon numbered 111-112, built, again, to the same specifications as the locomotives. Both locomotives and railcars collected power from overhead wires with a scheren (rhombus-shaped) pantograph.

Trains on the Ouchy line were made up of 2 passenger cars and a locomotive. The locomotives were on always the south (downhill) end of the train to prevent runaway trains. There were 2 trains on the line requiring 2 locomotives and 4 passenger cars, with 1 locomotive and passenger car held as spares. The Flon-Gare line was operated by one railcar with the other held at the yard as a spare.

In addition, there were 2 flat cars and a line car used to maintain the overhead wires. The locomotives were used to propel these cars.

== See also ==
- Lausanne Metro
