= Lausanne Metro =

Transit system of Lausanne, Switzerland

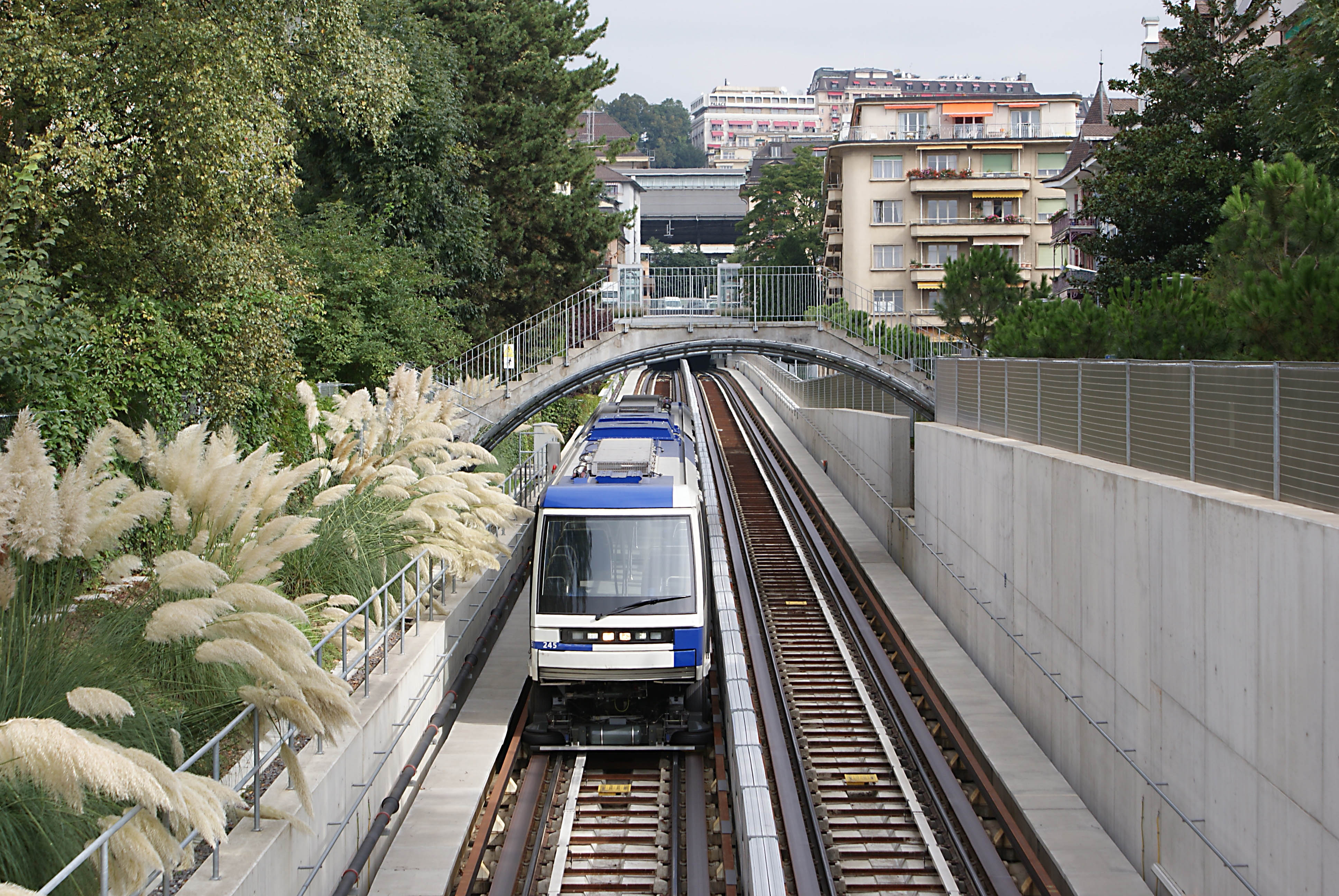
- Line M2 near Grancy station

Overview
- Native name: Métro de Lausanne (French)
- Locale: Lausanne, Vaud, Switzerland
- Transit type: Light rail (Line M1); Rapid transit (Line M2)
- Number of lines: 2
- Number of stations: 28
- Annual ridership: 45.4 million (2013)

Operation
- Began operation: June 2, 1991; 35 years ago
- Operator: Transports publics de la région lausannoise (TL)
- Number of vehicles: 40

Technical
- System length: M1: 7.8 km (4.8 mi); M2: 5.9 km (3.7 mi); Total: 13.7 km (8.5 mi)
- Track gauge: 1,435 mm (4 ft 8 1/2 in) standard gauge
- Electrification: yes
Map of Métro, suburban rail and trolleybus services in Lausanne
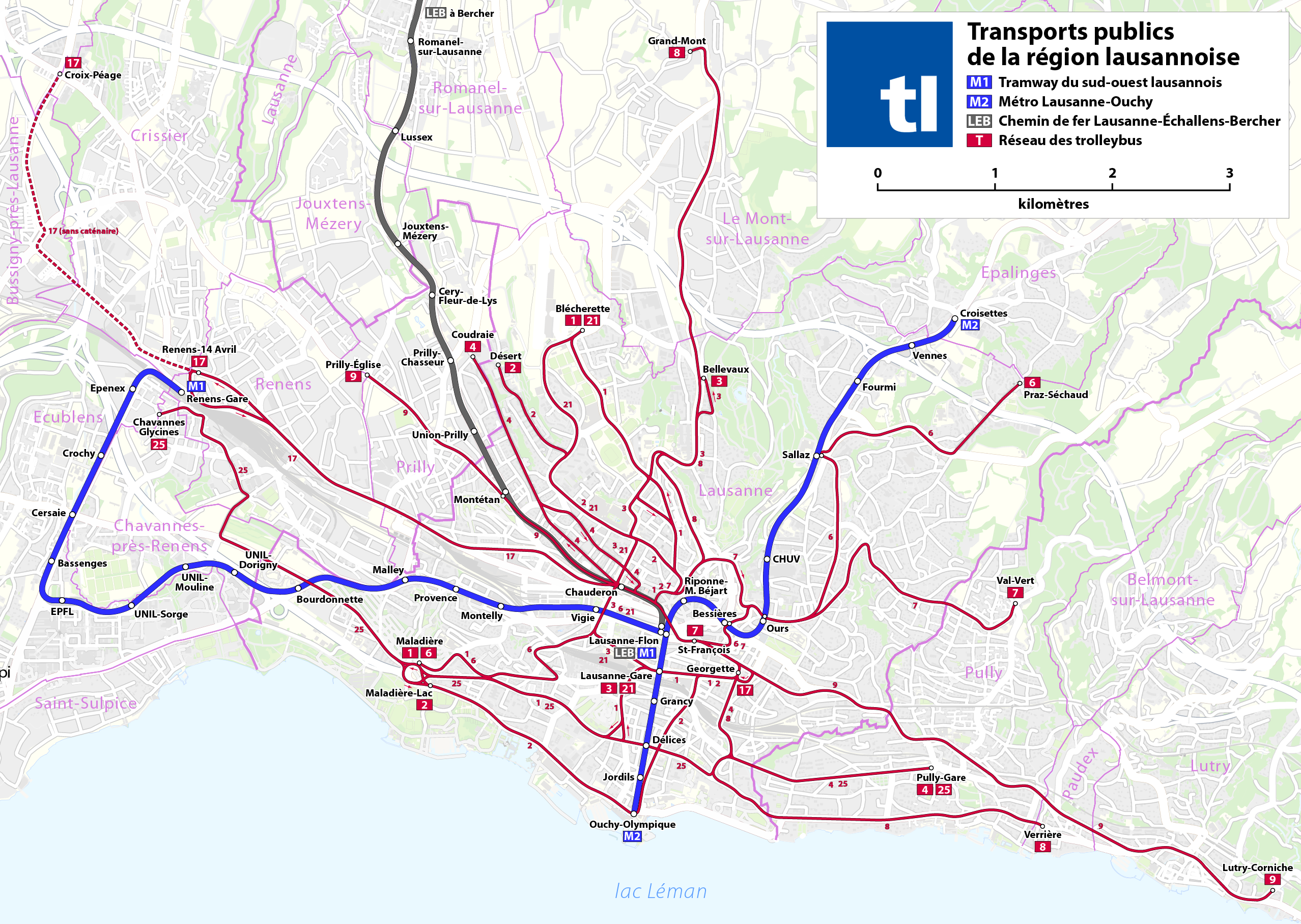

The Lausanne Metro (French: Métro de Lausanne, [metʁo d(ə) lozan]) is a two-line urban rail transport system in Lausanne, Vaud, Switzerland. Around a quarter of the system has been used for urban rail transport since 1877, when the route between the city centre and Ouchy on Lake Geneva opened as Switzerland's first public funicular railway. The network is owned by two distinct companies and operated by a third. It is Switzerland’s only metro railway network (Line M2).

Of the operating lines, only Line M2 can be considered a true, grade-separated rapid transit line. It is a fully automated, rubber-tyred metro line based on the technology of the Paris Métro and opened on 27 October 2008. Upon the opening of Line M2, Lausanne replaced Rennes, France, as the smallest city in the world to have a full metro system. A third line (Line M3) is now planned, based on the same rubber-tyred metro technology as Line M2.

== History ==
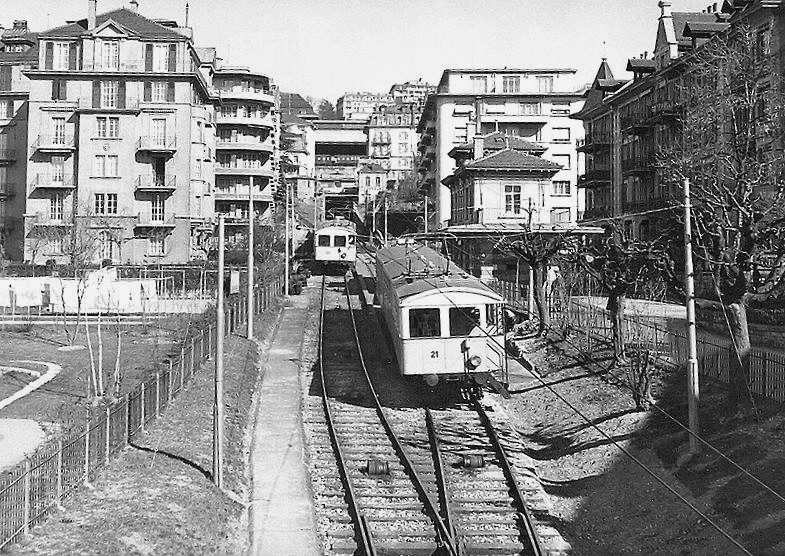
Former Métro Lausanne–Ouchy

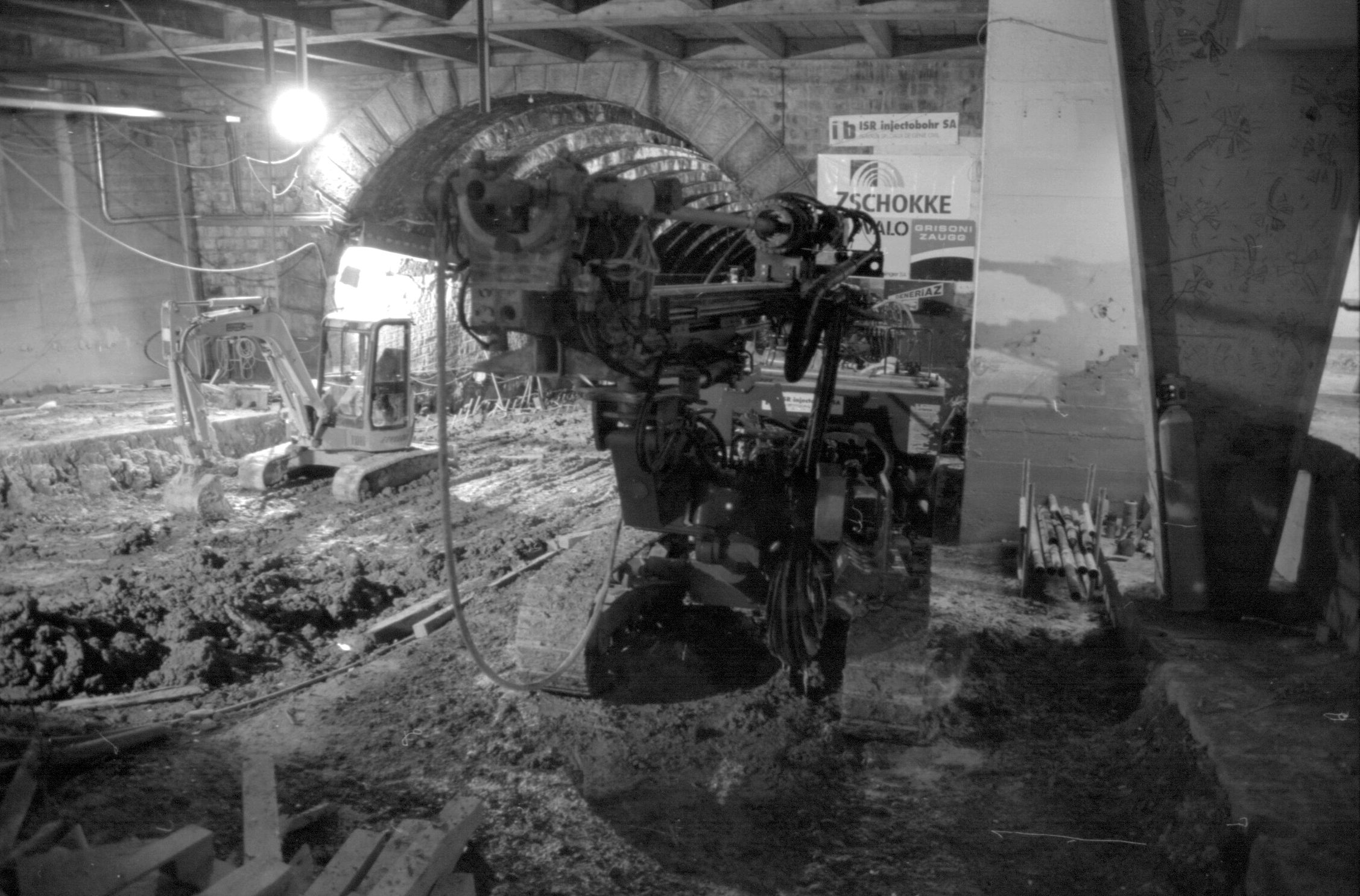
The M2 under construction on the stretch of the former Métro-Ouchy

The Lausanne-Ouchy railway, the precursor to the M2 Line of the Lausanne Métro, was inaugurated in 1877 as a funicular. In 1959 the first overhaul took place by transforming the funicular into a rack railway under the name "métro". At that time, Flon and Gare CFF stations were demolished and replaced by concrete underground equivalents. The line was however always nicknamed La Ficelle (literal translation: "The String") by its users due to its funicular past and circulation above ground in the greenery for more than half of its run.

Connected to the Flon facilities, the freight trains from the main station to the storage area of the harbour (in Flon) travelled on this line until the construction of a direct connection between the freight station of Sébeillon and the Flon Valley in 1954.

The line was finally closed to all traffic on 21 January 2006. The rolling stock was originally sold to the French city of Villard-de-Lans which planned the construction in 2008 of its own rack railway, La Patache, to ensure a link between the centre of Villard and Le Balcon de Villard.

A bus service was put into operation to replace the then-closed "La Ficelle" until the opening of the new metro M2 Line. This service was called Métrobus (MB): the south loop linked Ouchy to the CFF station and the north loop linked the station to Montbenon (which is located right above the Flon area).

Line M2 opened on 27 October 2008. This makes Lausanne the only city in Switzerland to have a full metro system; Zürich once proposed a U-Bahn system in the 1960s and 1970s, which failed in the face of massive political and public opposition, though Zürich does have sections of its S-Bahn network that see frequencies comparable to metro services. Line M1, however, is considered light rail albeit underground for a short section in the city centre.

== Current service ==
=== Line M1 ===
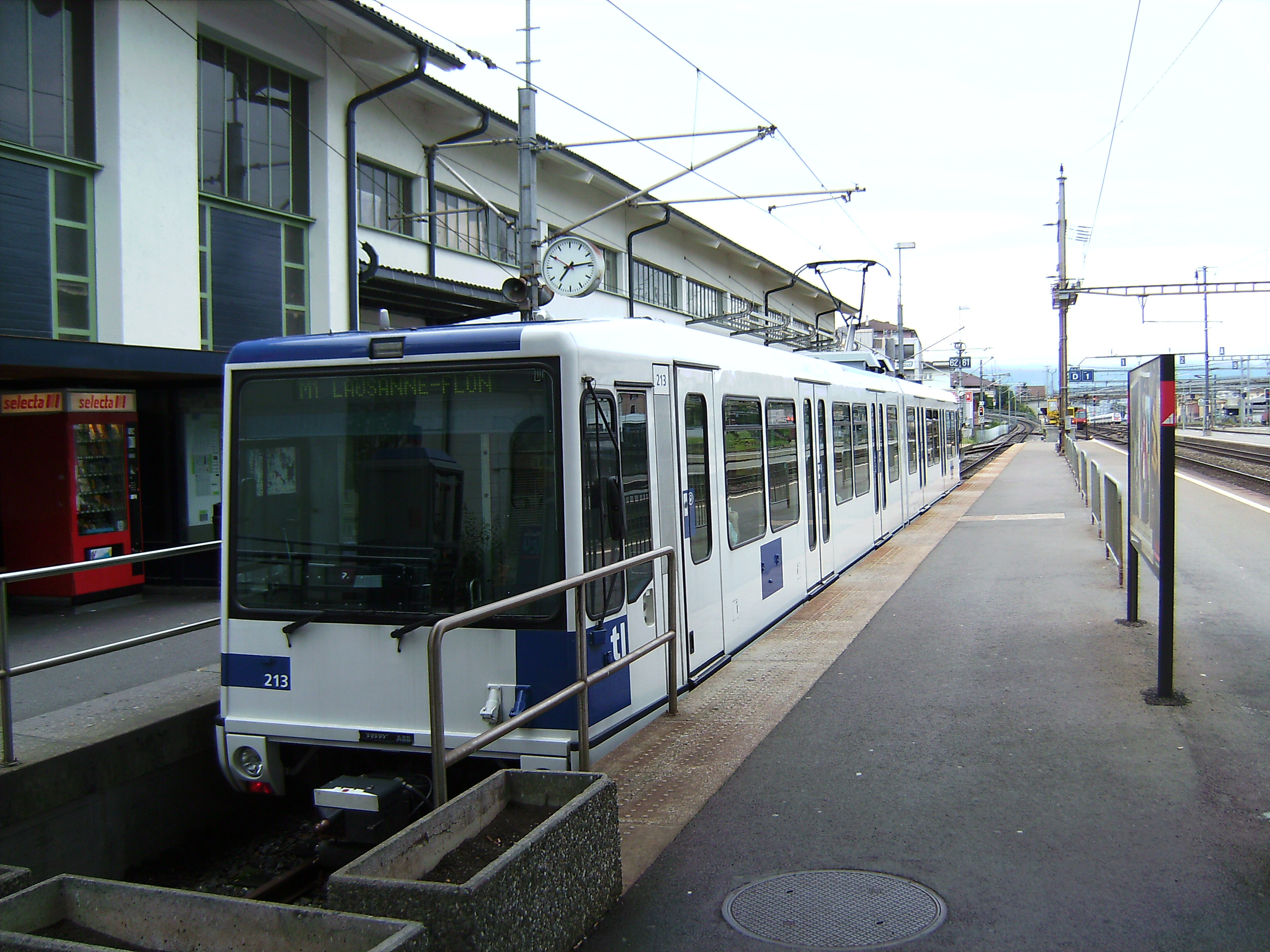
Line M1 standing at Renens terminus, adjacent to regional rail station

Line M1 or m1 is a 7.8 kilometres (4.8 mi) long light rail line and links Lausanne-Flon, in the centre of Lausanne, to Renens, to the west of the agglomeration. It serves an important purpose as it goes through the Lausanne campus, making it a crucial method of transportation for students accessing their university. Opened in 1991, the line was branded TSOL (Tramway du sud-ouest Lausannois) until 2000 when it was rebranded to its current name.

=== Line M2 ===
Line M2 is 5.9 kilometres (3.7 mi) long and uses the alignment of the former Lausanne-Ouchy railway, plus a new route towards Epalinges, crossing the whole city of Lausanne from north to south. Construction work (including enabling works) took around 4 years, and brought significant rebuilds of all former Métro Lausanne-Ouchy stations, plus involved moving the platforms at Lausanne-Flon station a short distance further north to give cross-platform interchange from northbound M2 to the Lausanne-Echallens-Bercher railway. The new line opened in autumn 2008. At points it climbs a gradient of 12%, the steepest slope for a metro line in the world.

== Future service ==
=== Line M3 ===
A Line M3 is proposed to serve the new development area of La Blécherette and the west of Lausanne (Malley, Renens Bussigny). Line M3 is planned to use metro technology compatible with the M2 and would be in correspondence with M1, M2 and LEB railway at the station Lausanne-Flon. The press theorised that the M3 could take over the M2 line from Ouchy to Lausanne Gare and a new terminus for the M2 would be established. However, this issue has subsequently been clarified: while new platforms will be built at Lausanne Gare, a second tunnel will be constructed from there to Grancy, underneath the main railway station. Under these proposals, both lines 2 and 3 will share the physical track onwards to Ouchy. This additional tunnel would bring the immediate benefit of allowing more frequent métro services to the railway station. The proposals were put to a referendum in February 2014, and having won public approval in the vote, work on the new line was projected to start in 2018, and a managerial position for the project has been advertised.

In 2014, it was reported that the first stage of construction would be between Lausanne-Chauderon station, Lausanne-Gare and Ouchy, as a total of 47 million francs have been given to the project by the Federal Council. It is expected the second phase of work, between Chauderon and La Blécherette, will cost a further 72 million francs. Public inquiries into the first construction project have now opened, covering the initial stretch to reroute line 2 between Grancy and the current Lausanne-Gare platforms.

== Network map ==
Schematic network map

== See also ==
- Lausanne tramway
- Trolleybuses in Lausanne
- Public transport in the Lausanne Region
