= Etagnières railway station =

Railway station in Étagnières, Switzerland

Etagnières
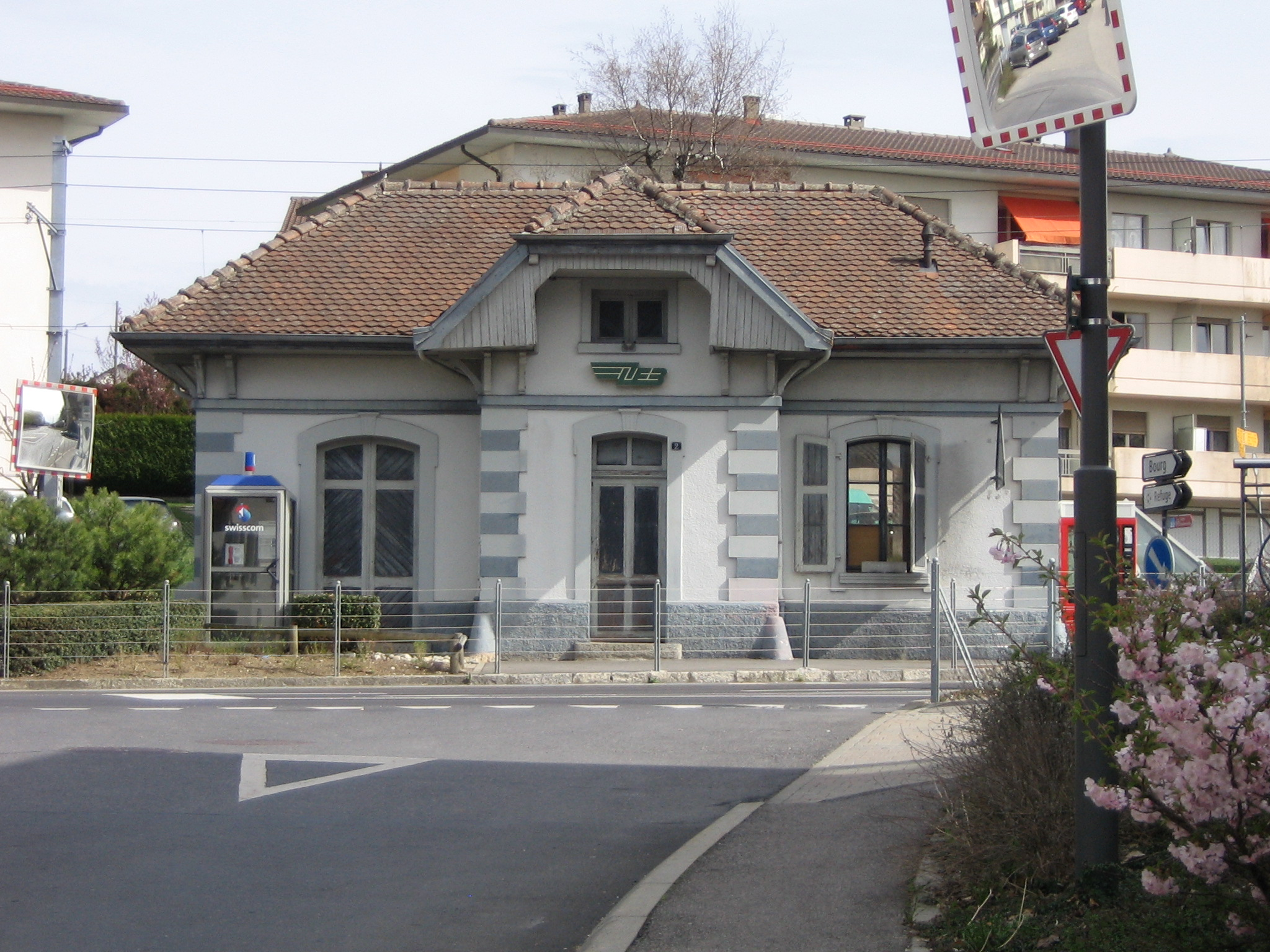
- The station building in 2011

General information
- Location: Étagnières, Vaud; Switzerland
- Coordinates: 46°36′00″N 6°36′47″E
- Elevation: 631 m (2,070 ft)
- Owner: Chemin de fer Lausanne-Échallens-Bercher
- Line: Lausanne–Bercher line
- Distance: 10.1 km (6.3 mi) from Lausanne-Flon
- Platforms: 1 side platform
- Tracks: 1
- Train operators: Chemin de fer Lausanne-Échallens-Bercher

Construction
- Accessible: Yes

Other information
- Station code: 8501171 (ETA)
- Fare zone: 16 and 50 (mobilis)

History
- Opened: 1874
- Rebuilt: 1912–3 (new station building); 2024 (relocated to temporary site)
- Electrified: 7 December 1935

Services
Preceding station	LEB	Following station
Assens towards Echallens or Bercher	R20	Les Ripes towards Lausanne-Flon
Location

Etagnières railway station (French: Halte d'Etagnières) is a railway station in the municipality of Étagnières, in the Swiss canton of Vaud. It is located on the 1,000 mm (3 ft 3 3/8 in) Lausanne–Bercher line of the Chemin de fer Lausanne-Échallens-Bercher (LEB). The station has a single track and platform.

Etagnières station opened to service in 1874, as an intermediate station on the line between Lausanne-Chauderon and Échallens stations. In 1912–3, the original wooden building was replaced by a masonry structure, which still exists. The line was electrified in 1935.

In 2024, the original station was replaced by a temporary stop just to the north. This is in preparation for the planned 1-kilometre (0.62 mi) long tunnel under Étagnières, which will include a new Etagnières station, and a new double-track section towards Assens station. The temporary stop is fully accessible.

== Services ==
As of the December 2023 timetable change, the following services stop at Etagnières:

- Regio: service every fifteen minutes between Lausanne-Flon and Echallens, with every other train continuing from Echallens to Bercher.

== Gallery ==
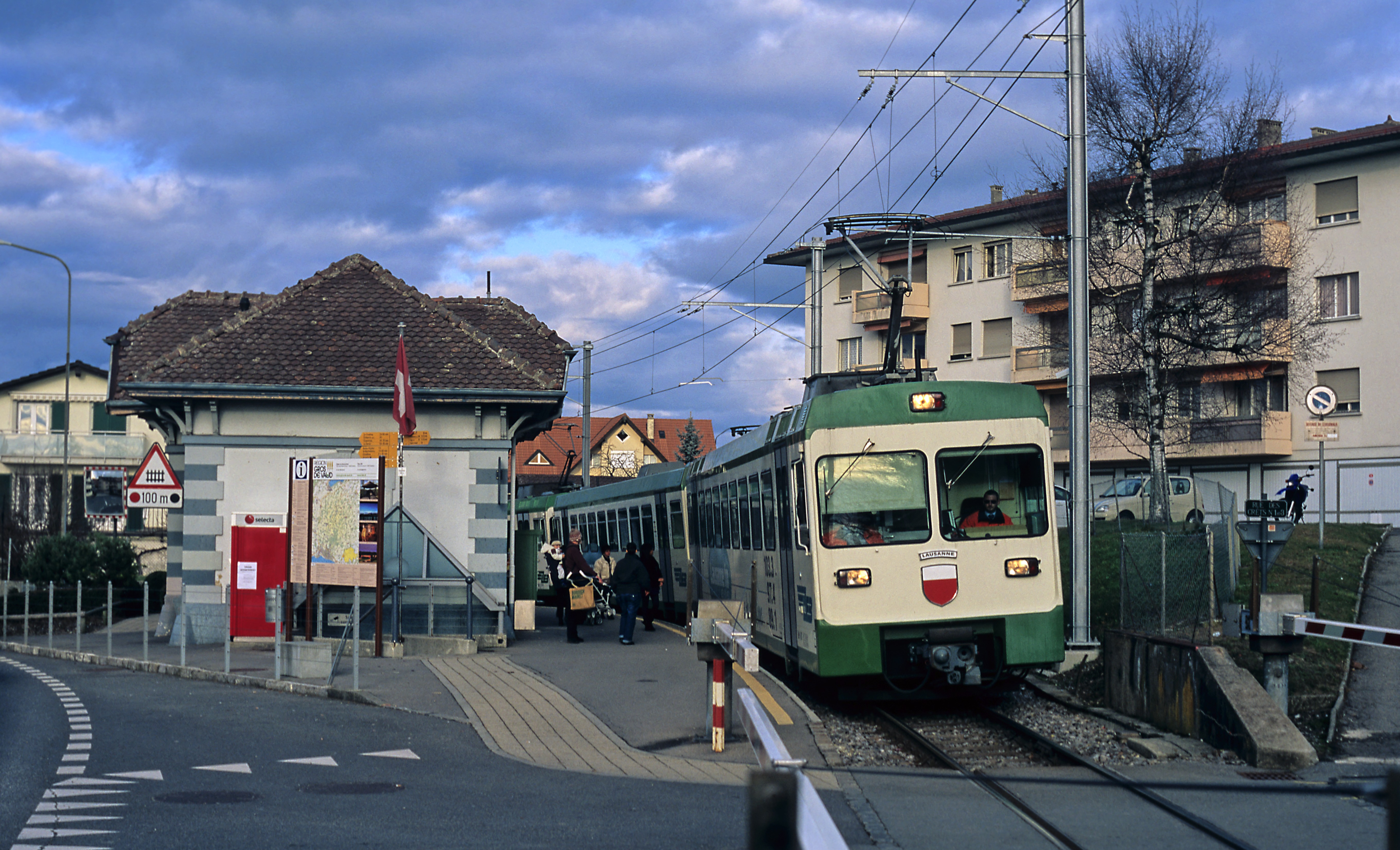
Station building with platform to right and road to left

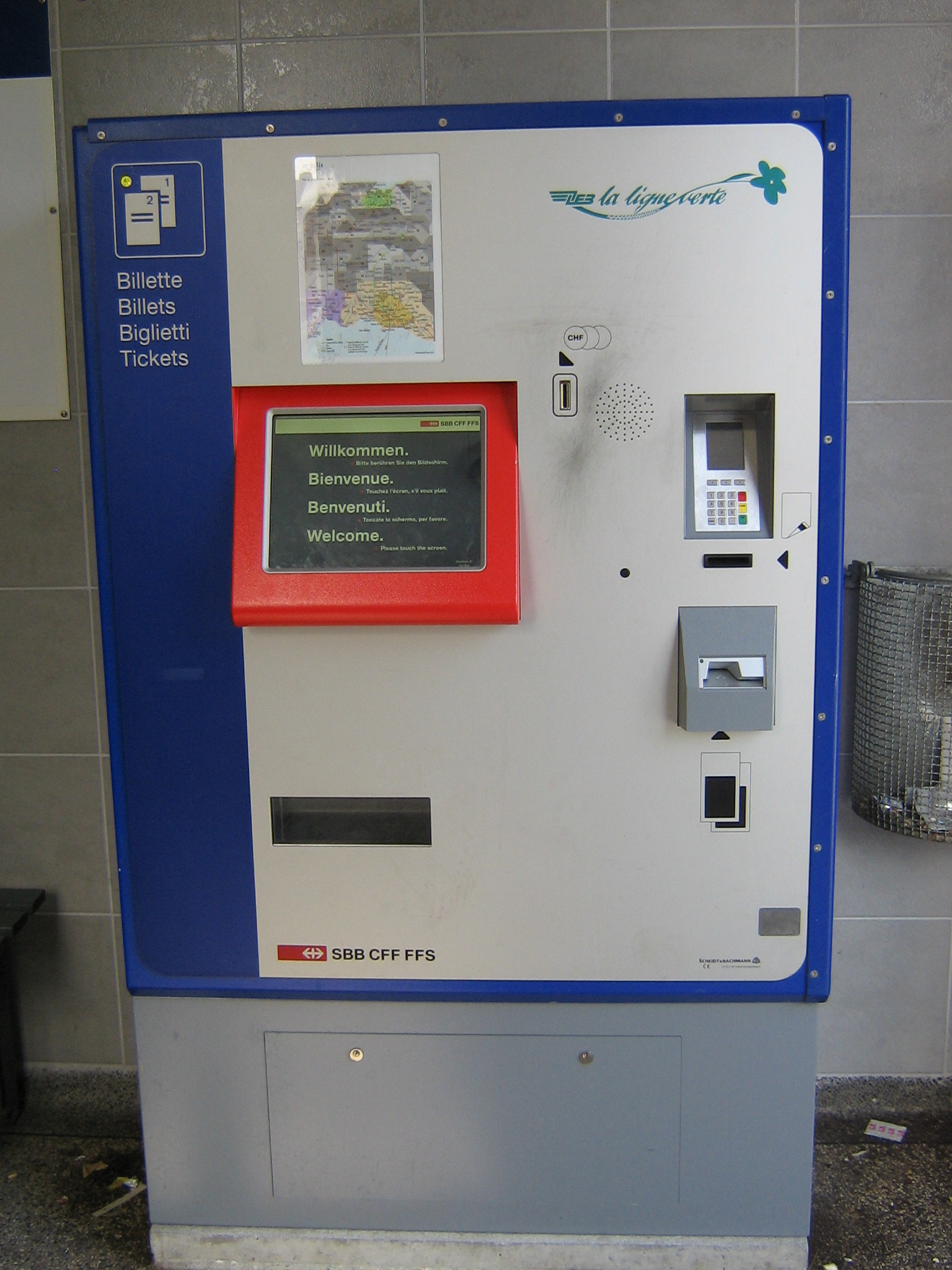
Ticket machine

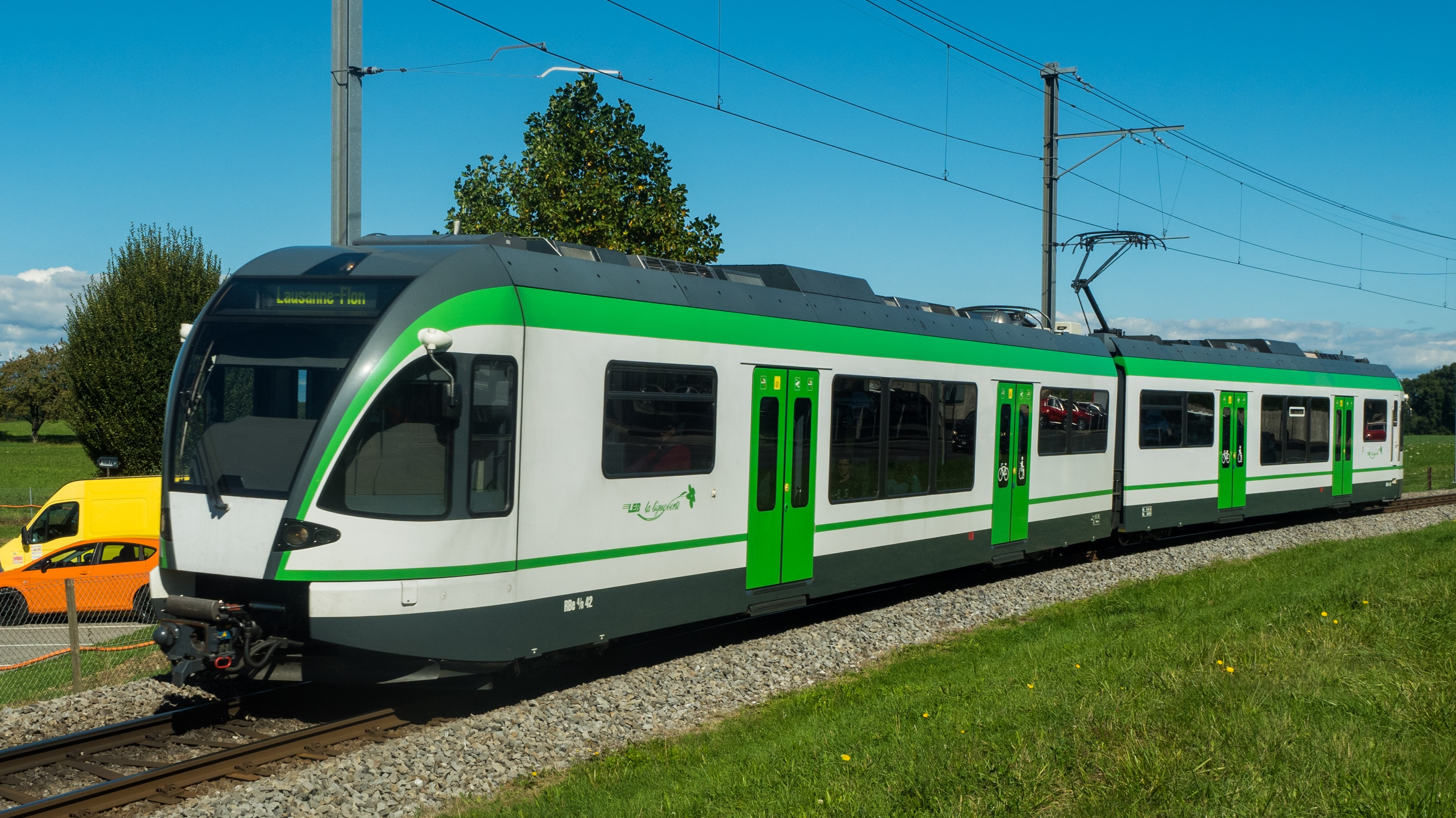
Train at the approximate location of the current temporary halt
