= Montétan railway station =

Railway station in Switzerland

Montétan
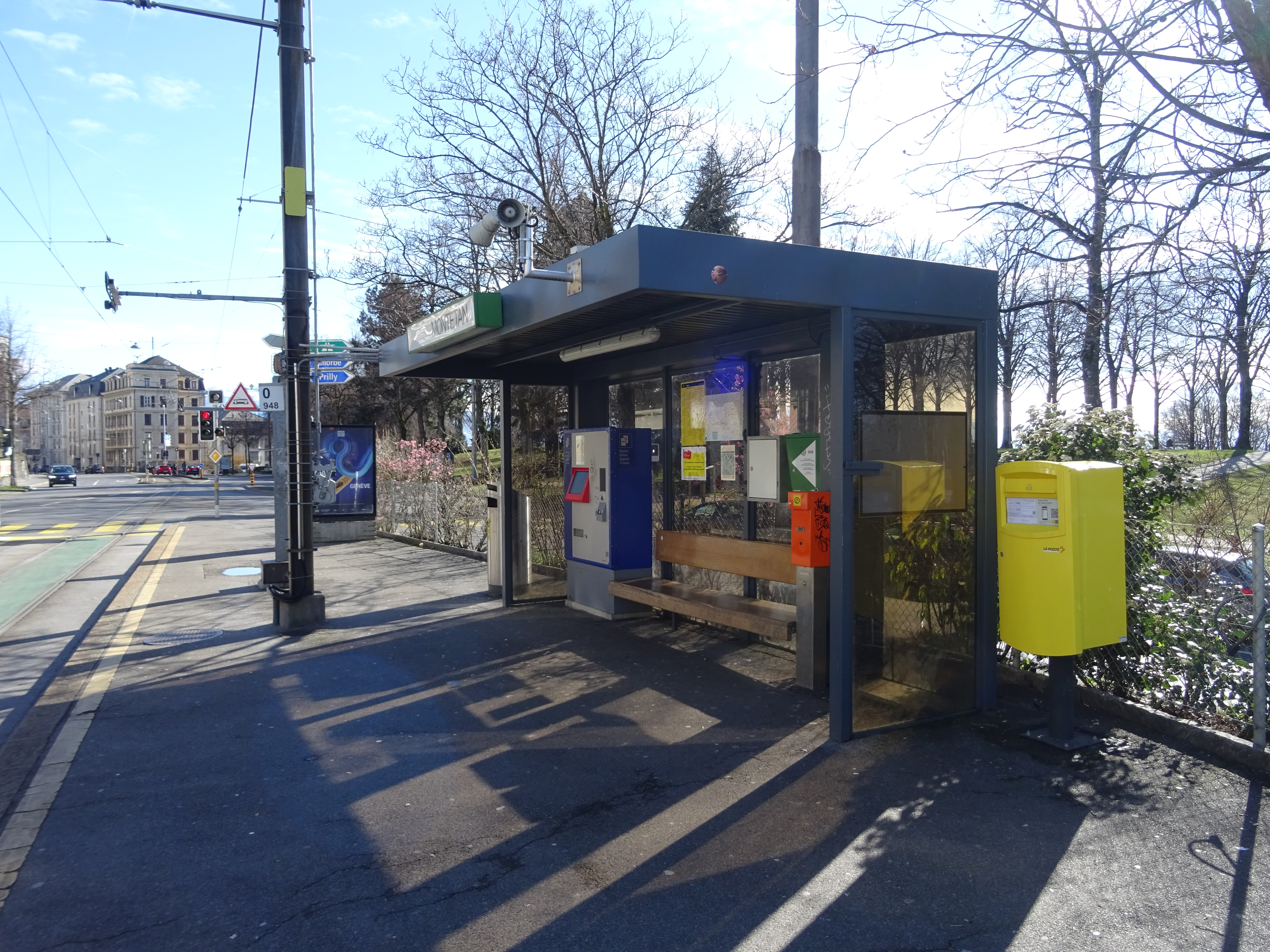
- The station shelter in 2020

General information
- Location: Lausanne, Vaud; Switzerland
- Coordinates: 46°31′49″N 6°36′47″E
- Elevation: 502 m (1,647 ft)
- Owner: Chemin de fer Lausanne-Échallens-Bercher
- Line: Lausanne–Bercher line
- Distance: 1.9 km (1.2 mi) from Lausanne-Flon
- Platforms: At-street boarding
- Tracks: 1
- Train operators: Chemin de fer Lausanne-Échallens-Bercher
- Connections: tl bus and trolleybus lines

Other information
- Fare zone: 11 (mobilis)

History
- Closed: 25 September 2021
Location

Montétan railway station (French: Gare de Montétan) was a railway station in the municipality of Lausanne, in the Swiss canton of Vaud. It was located on the 1,000 mm (3 ft 3 3/8 in) Lausanne–Bercher line of the Chemin de fer Lausanne-Échallens-Bercher (LEB).

Montétan was on the original street running section of the LEB between Lausanne-Chauderon and Union-Prilly stations, opened in 1873. Between 1899 and 1964, the track between Chauderon and Montétan were shared with the Lausanne Tramway Company (TL) electric tramway to Prilly, which diverged at a junction adjacent to the station.

In 2021 the station was closed and demolished due to the construction of a tunnel, replacing the street running section of the railway. There is no equivalent station in the tunnel, and trains now run non-stop between Chauderon and Union-Prilly.

== Former Services ==
As of the December 2020 timetable change, the following services stopped at Montétan:

- Regio: service every fifteen minutes between Lausanne-Flon and Echallens, with every other train continuing from Echallens to Bercher.

== Gallery ==
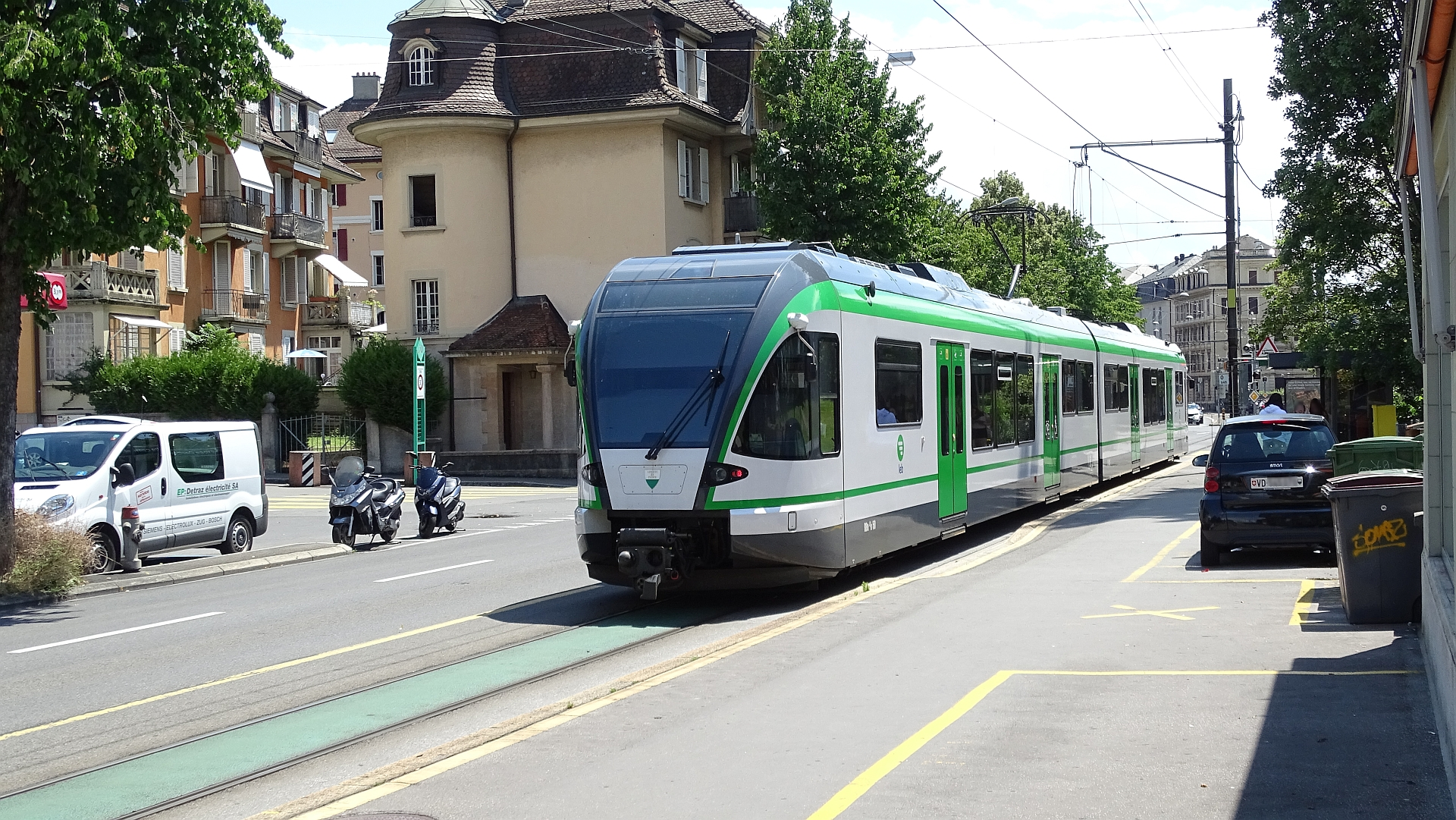
Train at the station, looking towards the city centre

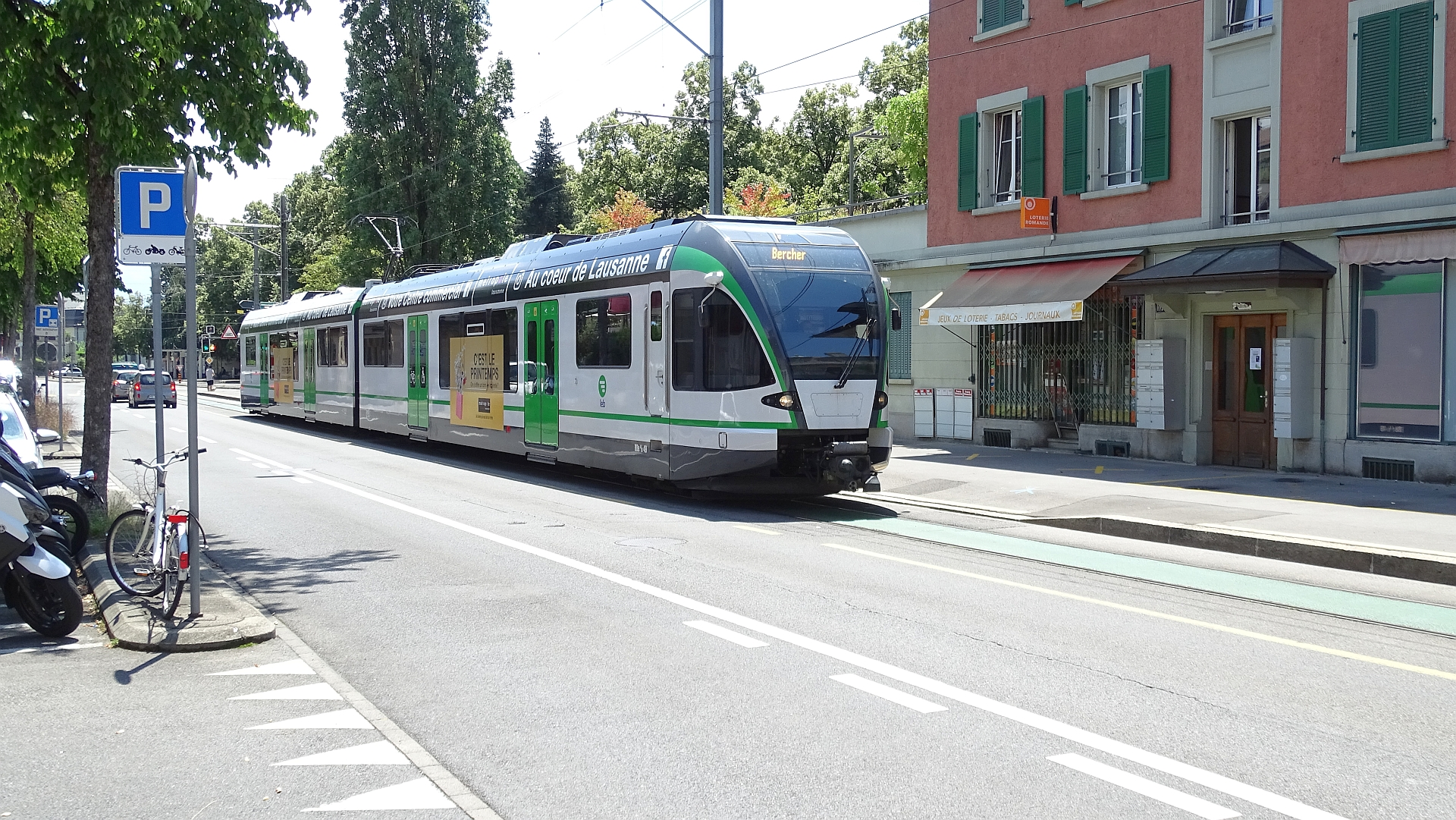
Train at the station, viewed from across the street

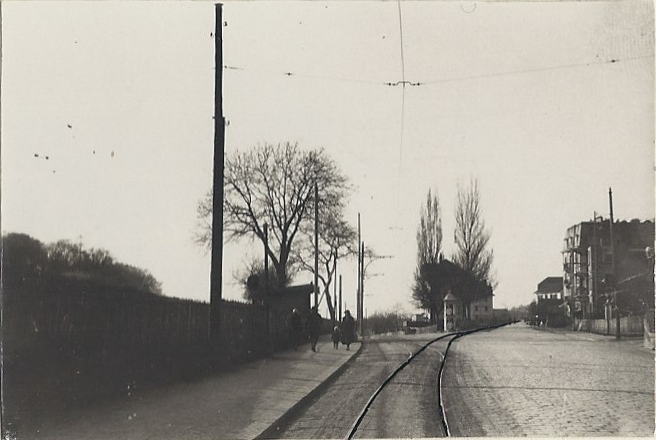
Junction in 1923, between TL tramway and LEB railway
