= Les Ripes railway station =

Railway station in Étagnières, Switzerland

Les Ripes
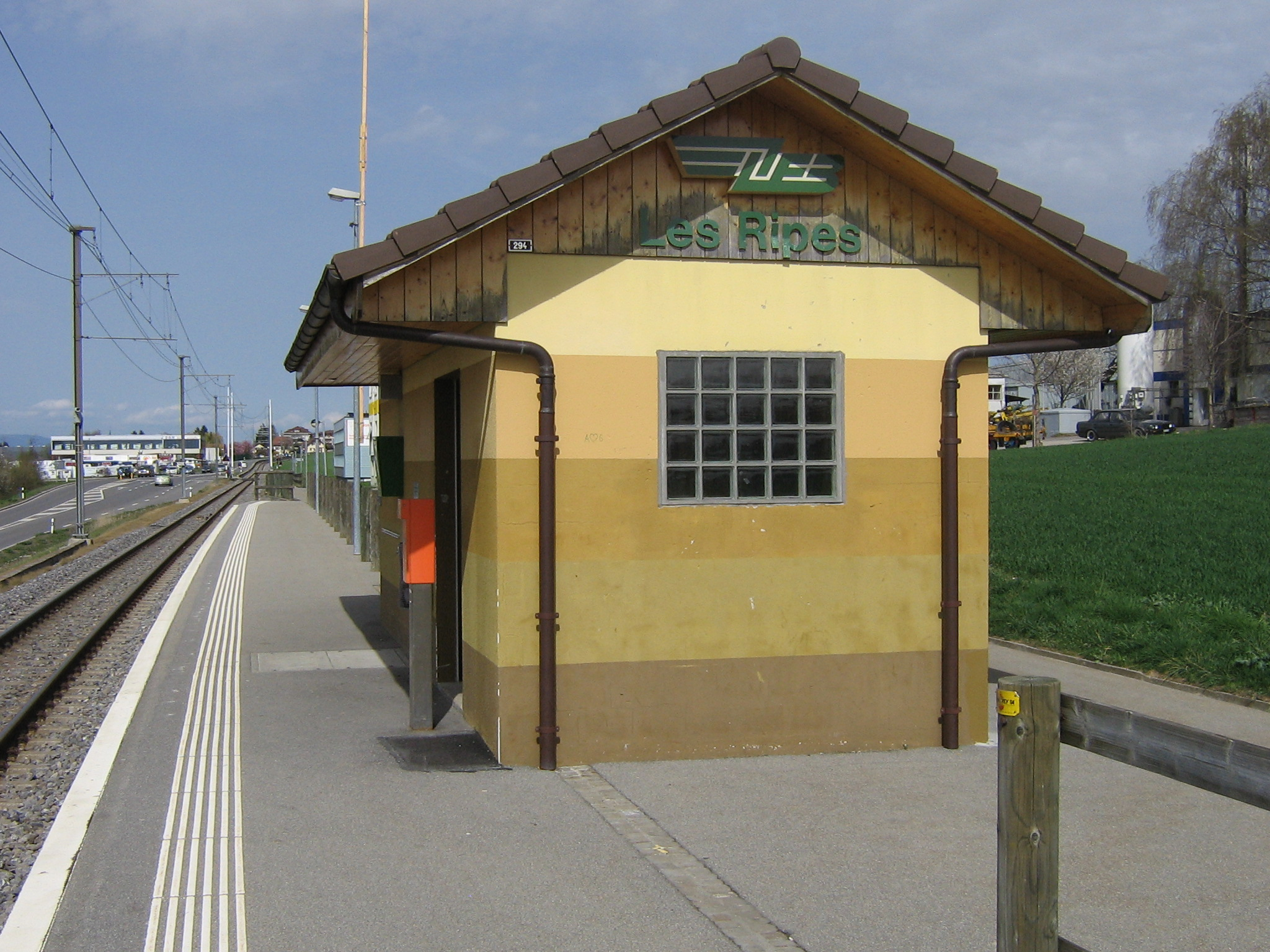
- The station platform in 2011

General information
- Location: Étagnières, Vaud; Switzerland
- Coordinates: 46°35′32″N 6°36′29″E
- Elevation: 623 m (2,044 ft)
- Owner: Chemin de fer Lausanne-Échallens-Bercher
- Line: Lausanne–Bercher line
- Distance: 9.1 km (5.7 mi) from Lausanne-Flon
- Platforms: 2 side platforms
- Tracks: 2
- Train operators: Chemin de fer Lausanne-Échallens-Bercher

Construction
- Accessible: Yes

Other information
- Station code: 8587727 (RIPE)
- Fare zone: 16 (mobilis)

History
- Opened: 31 May 1999
- Rebuilt: 2015

Services
Preceding station	LEB	Following station
Etagnières towards Echallens or Bercher	R20	Cheseaux towards Lausanne-Flon
Location

Les Ripes railway station (French: Halte Les Ripes) is a railway station in the municipality of Étagnières, in the Swiss canton of Vaud. It is located on the 1,000 mm (3 ft 3 3/8 in) Lausanne–Bercher line of the Chemin de fer Lausanne-Échallens-Bercher (LEB).

The station opened on 31st May 1999. As built, it had a station building and a single track and platform. In 2015, the station was rebuilt, with the construction of a dynamic passing loop and a second platform, and the relocation of the station building to the north. A nearby level crossing was replaced by a railway bridge.

== Services ==
As of the December 2023 timetable change, the following services stop at Les Ripes:

- Regio: service every fifteen minutes between Lausanne-Flon and Echallens, with every other train continuing from Echallens to Bercher.
