= Sur Roche railway station =

Railway station in Échallens, Vaud, Switzerland

Sur Roche
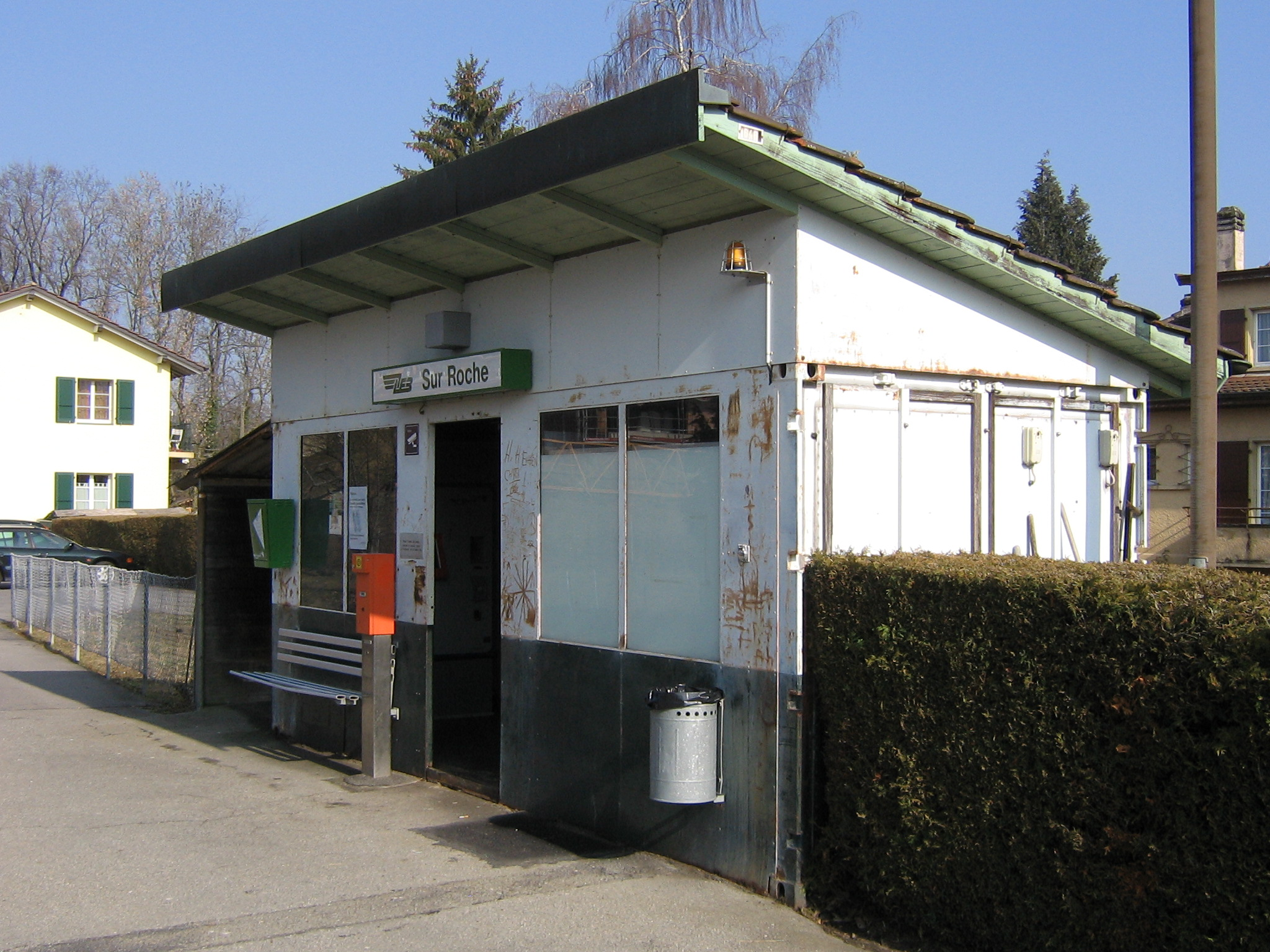
- The station in 2011

General information
- Location: Échallens, Vaud; Switzerland
- Coordinates: 46°38′26″N 6°38′20″E
- Elevation: 625 m (2,051 ft)
- Owner: Chemin de fer Lausanne-Échallens-Bercher
- Line: Lausanne–Bercher line
- Distance: 15.7 km (9.8 mi) from Lausanne-Flon
- Platforms: 1 side platform
- Tracks: 1
- Train operators: Chemin de fer Lausanne-Échallens-Bercher

Construction
- Accessible: Yes

Other information
- Station code: 8501174 (SROC)
- Fare zone: 50 and 51 (mobilis)

History
- Opened: 1946

Services
Preceding station	LEB	Following station
Grésaley towards Bercher	R20	Echallens towards Lausanne-Flon
Location

Sur Roche railway station (French: Halte de Sur Roche) is a railway station in the municipality of Échallens, in the Swiss canton of Vaud. It is located on the 1,000 mm (3 ft 3 3/8 in) Lausanne–Bercher line of the Chemin de fer Lausanne-Échallens-Bercher (LEB). The station opened in 1946, and has a single track and platform.

== Services ==
As of the December 2023 timetable change, the following services stop at Sur Roche:

- Regio: half-hourly service between Lausanne-Flon and Bercher.
