= Prilly-Chasseur railway station =

Railway station in Prilly, Switzerland

Prilly-Chasseur
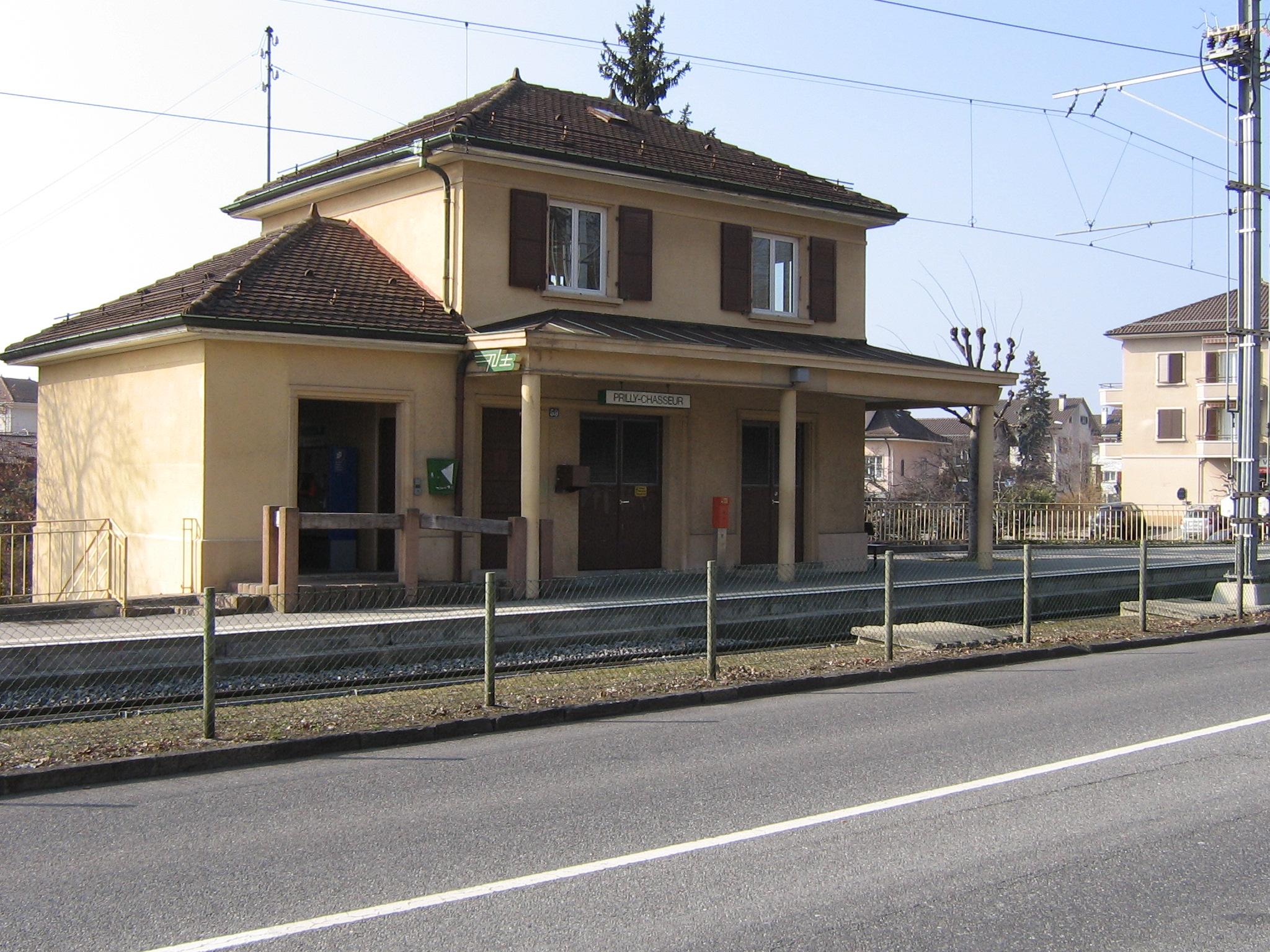
- The station building in 2011

General information
- Location: Prilly, Vaud; Switzerland
- Coordinates: 46°32′23″N 6°36′27″E
- Elevation: 525 m (1,722 ft)
- Owner: Chemin de fer Lausanne-Échallens-Bercher
- Line: Lausanne–Bercher line
- Distance: 3.1 km (1.9 mi) from Lausanne-Flon
- Platforms: 1 side platform
- Tracks: 1
- Train operators: Chemin de fer Lausanne-Échallens-Bercher
- Connections: TL bus route 33

Construction
- Accessible: Yes

Other information
- Station code: 8501163 (PRCH)
- Fare zone: 12 (mobilis)

Services
Preceding station	LEB	Following station
Cery-Fleur-de-Lys towards Echallens or Bercher	R20	Union-Prilly towards Lausanne-Flon
Location

Prilly-Chasseur railway station (French: Halte de Prilly-Chasseur) is a railway station in the municipality of Prilly, in the Swiss canton of Vaud. It is located on the 1,000 mm (3 ft 3 3/8 in) Lausanne–Bercher line of the Chemin de fer Lausanne-Échallens-Bercher (LEB). The station has a single track and platform.

== Services ==
As of the December 2023 timetable change, the following services stop at Prilly-Chasseur:

- Regio: service every fifteen minutes between Lausanne-Flon and Echallens, with every other train continuing from Echallens to Bercher.
