= Assens railway station (Switzerland) =

Railway station in Assens, Switzerland

Assens
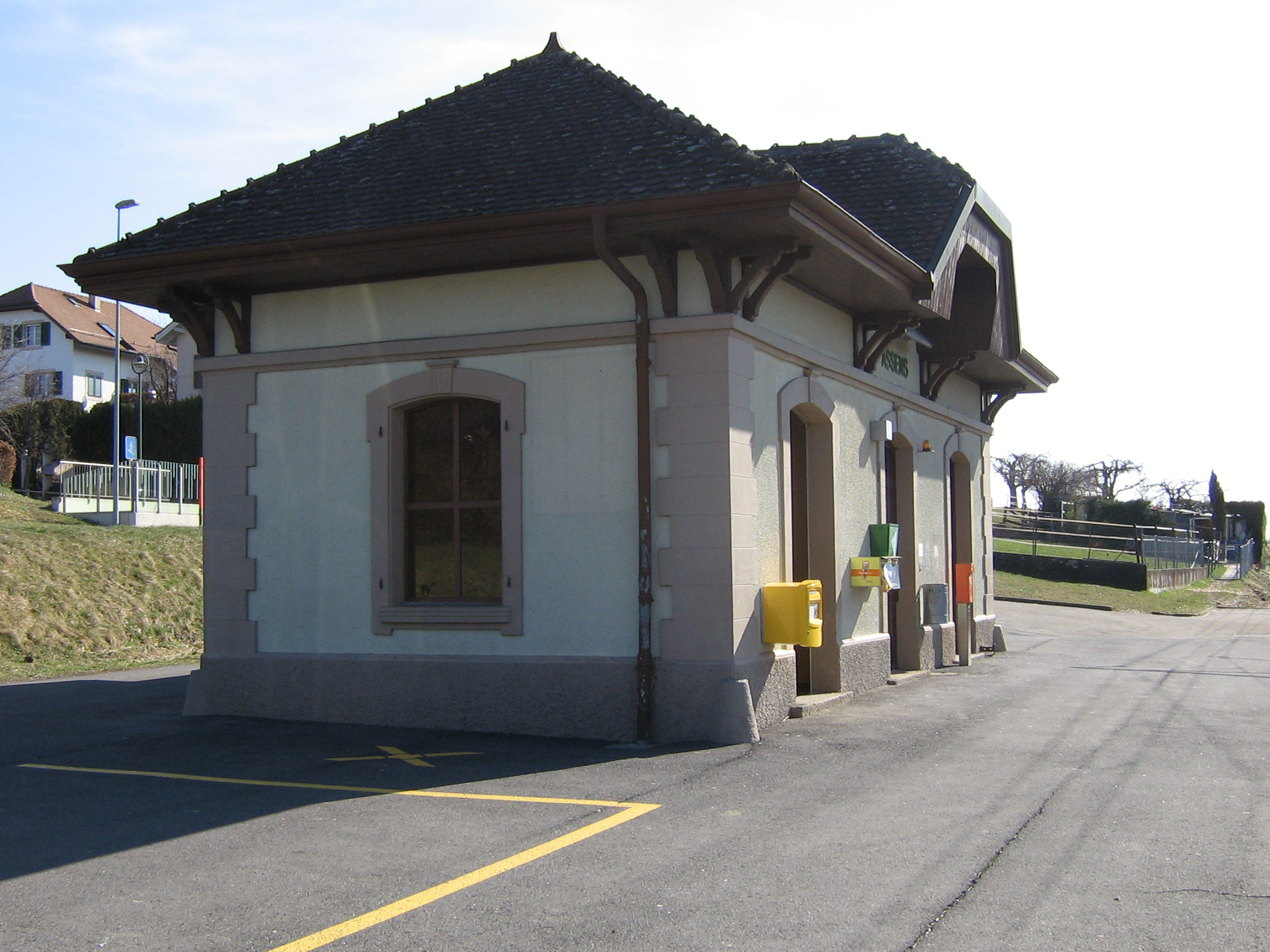
- The station building in 2011

General information
- Location: Assens, Vaud; Switzerland
- Coordinates: 46°36′47″N 6°37′14″E
- Elevation: 625 m (2,051 ft)
- Owner: Chemin de fer Lausanne-Échallens-Bercher
- Line: Lausanne–Bercher line
- Distance: 11.7 km (7.3 mi) from Lausanne-Flon
- Platforms: 2 side platforms
- Tracks: 2
- Train operators: Chemin de fer Lausanne-Échallens-Bercher

Construction
- Accessible: Yes

Other information
- Station code: 8501172 (ASNS)
- Fare zone: 50 (mobilis)

History
- Opened: 1874
- Rebuilt: 1903 (passing loop added); 2016
- Electrified: 7 December 1935

Services
Preceding station	LEB	Following station
Echallens towards Echallens or Bercher	R20	Etagnières towards Lausanne-Flon
Echallens Terminus	R20	Etagnières towards Lausanne-Flon
Location

Assens railway station (French: Gare de Assens) is a railway station in the municipality of Assens, in the Swiss canton of Vaud. It is located on the 1,000 mm (3 ft 3 3/8 in) Lausanne–Bercher line of the Chemin de fer Lausanne-Échallens-Bercher (LEB).

Assens station opened to service in 1874, as an intermediate station on the line between Lausanne-Chauderon and Échallens stations. As originally built, the line followed the road from Assens to Echallens station. A passing loop was added in 1903 and, in 1908, the line between Assens and Echallens was diverted to the west. The line was electrified in 1935.

In 2016, the station was rebuilt to allow for a 15-minute interval service. The passing loop was extended 200 metres (660 ft) to the south of the station, new 130-metre (430 ft) long side platforms were constructed with a platform height of 55 centimetres (22 in), and the station building was raised by 20 centimetres (7.9 in) to be level with them. The existing underpass was improved and a new park-and-ride facility built to replace the old one.

== Services ==
As of the December 2023 timetable change, the following services stop at Assens:

- Regio: service every fifteen minutes between Lausanne-Flon and Echallens, with every other train continuing from Echallens to Bercher.
