= Grésaley railway station =

Railway station in Échallens, Switzerland

Grésaley
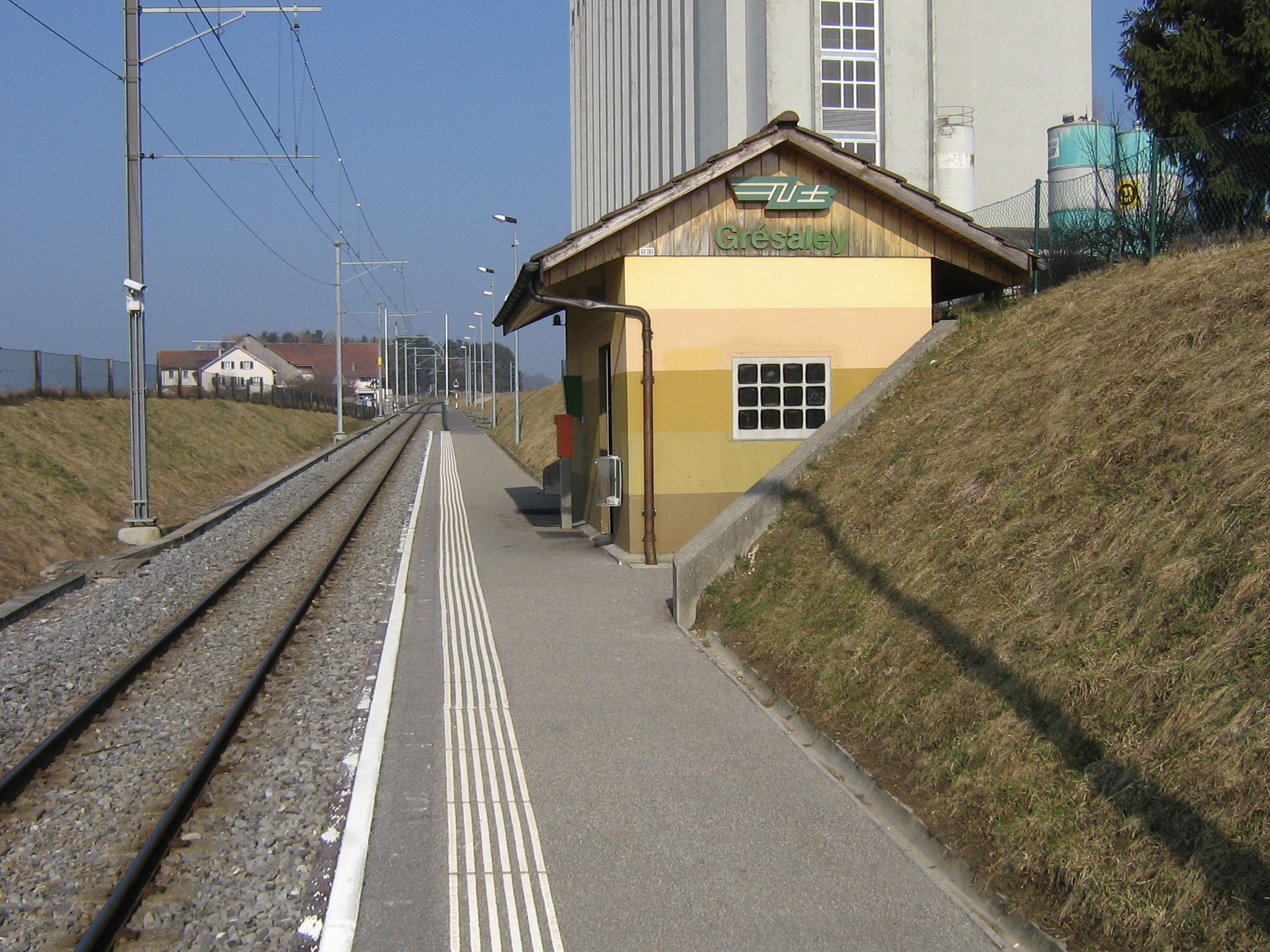
- The station in 2011

General information
- Location: Échallens, Vaud; Switzerland
- Coordinates: 46°38′35″N 6°38′32″E
- Elevation: 620 m (2,030 ft)
- Owner: Chemin de fer Lausanne-Échallens-Bercher
- Line: Lausanne–Bercher line
- Distance: 16.1 km (10.0 mi) from Lausanne-Flon
- Platforms: 1 side platform
- Tracks: 1
- Train operators: Chemin de fer Lausanne-Échallens-Bercher

Construction
- Accessible: Yes

Other information
- Station code: 8501178 (GRES)
- Fare zone: 50 and 51 (mobilis)

History
- Opened: 1977

Services
Preceding station	LEB	Following station
Sugnens towards Bercher	R20	Sur Roche towards Lausanne-Flon
Location

Grésaley railway station (French: Halte du Grésaley) is a railway station in the municipality of Échallens, in the Swiss canton of Vaud. It is located on the 1,000 mm (3 ft 3 3/8 in) Lausanne–Bercher line of the Chemin de fer Lausanne-Échallens-Bercher (LEB). The station opened in 1977, and has a single track and platform.

== Services ==
As of the December 2023 timetable change, the following services stop at Grésaley:

- Regio: half-hourly service between Lausanne-Flon and Bercher.
