= Union-Prilly railway station =

Railway station in Prilly, Switzerland

Union-Prilly
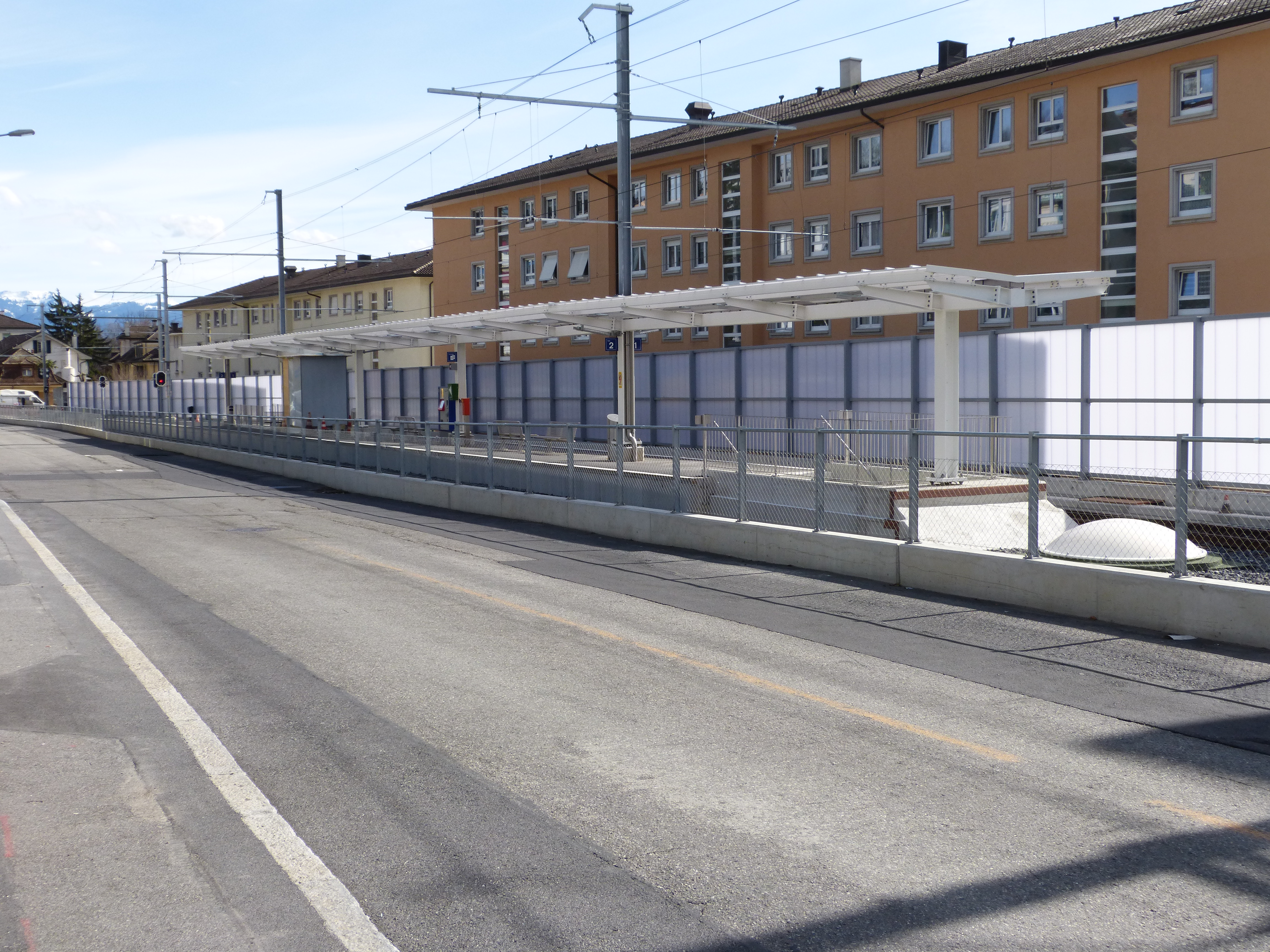
- The rebuilt station in 2013

General information
- Location: Prilly, Vaud; Switzerland
- Coordinates: 46°32′05″N 6°36′35″E
- Elevation: 508 m (1,667 ft)
- Owner: Chemin de fer Lausanne-Échallens-Bercher
- Line: Lausanne–Bercher line
- Distance: 2.5 km (1.6 mi) from Lausanne-Flon
- Platforms: 1 island platform
- Tracks: 2
- Train operators: Chemin de fer Lausanne-Échallens-Bercher

Construction
- Accessible: Yes

Other information
- Station code: 8501162 (UPRI)
- Fare zone: 11 and 12 (mobilis)

History
- Opened: 1935

Services
Preceding station	LEB	Following station
Prilly-Chasseur towards Echallens or Bercher	R20	Lausanne-Chauderon towards Lausanne-Flon
Location

Union-Prilly railway station (French: Gare d'Union-Prilly) is a railway station in the municipality of Prilly, in the Swiss canton of Vaud. It is located on the 1,000 mm (3 ft 3 3/8 in) Lausanne–Bercher line of the Chemin de fer Lausanne-Échallens-Bercher (LEB).

The station opened in 1935, after the completion of the electrification of the railway.

== Services ==
As of the December 2023 timetable change, the following services stop at Union-Prilly:

- Regio: service every fifteen minutes between Lausanne-Flon and Echallens, with every other train continuing from Echallens to Bercher.
