= LEB Be 4/8 61–66 =

Class of Swiss multiple units

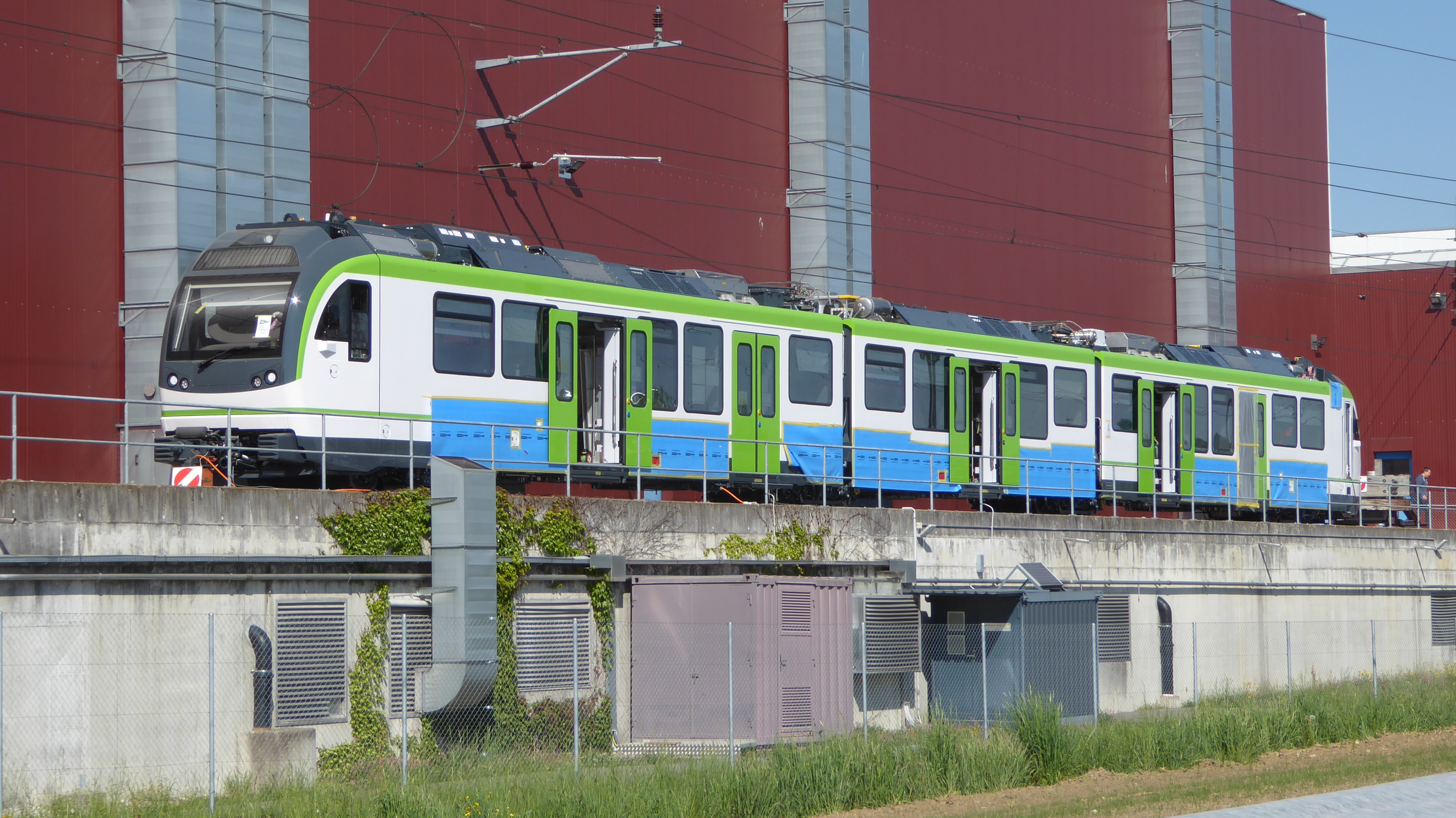
- A member of the class awaiting delivery from Bussnang.
- Manufacturer: Stadler Rail
- Entered service: 2019
- Number built: 6
- Fleet numbers: 61–66
- Operator: Chemin de fer Lausanne-Échallens-Bercher

Specifications
- Train length: 44,800 mm (146 ft 11 3/4 in)
- Maximum speed: 90 km/h (56 mph)
- Electric system: 1500 V DC Overhead
- Current collection: Pantograph
- Track gauge: 1,000 mm (3 ft 3 3/8 in) metre gauge

LEB Be 4/8 61–66 is a class of six metre gauge three-section low-floor articulated railcars, with a further four on order, operated by the Chemin de fer Lausanne-Échallens-Bercher and used on their Lausanne–Échallens–Bercher railway line.

The units were ordered in 2017 from Stadler Rail, and are to a design derived from the Worbla units supplied to Regionalverkehr Bern-Solothurn. The new units were built at Stadler Rail's plant in Bussnang, and were delivered in 2019 and 2020. They measure 44.8 metres (147 ft) in length, have five doors on each side, can seat 106 passengers, and have a maximum speed of 90 kilometres per hour (56 mph).

This class, together with ten two-car low-floor multiple units (RBe 4/8 41-50) delivered by Stadler Rail between 2010 and 2017, have replaced all previous classes in normal service.

A further four similar units were ordered in 2024, to be delivered in 2027. The ordered units are intended to supplement capacity on the line, and allow the introduction of a peak 10-minute interval service between Lausanne-Flon and Echallens stations.
