= LEB G 3/3 8 =

LEB G 3/3 8 Échallens
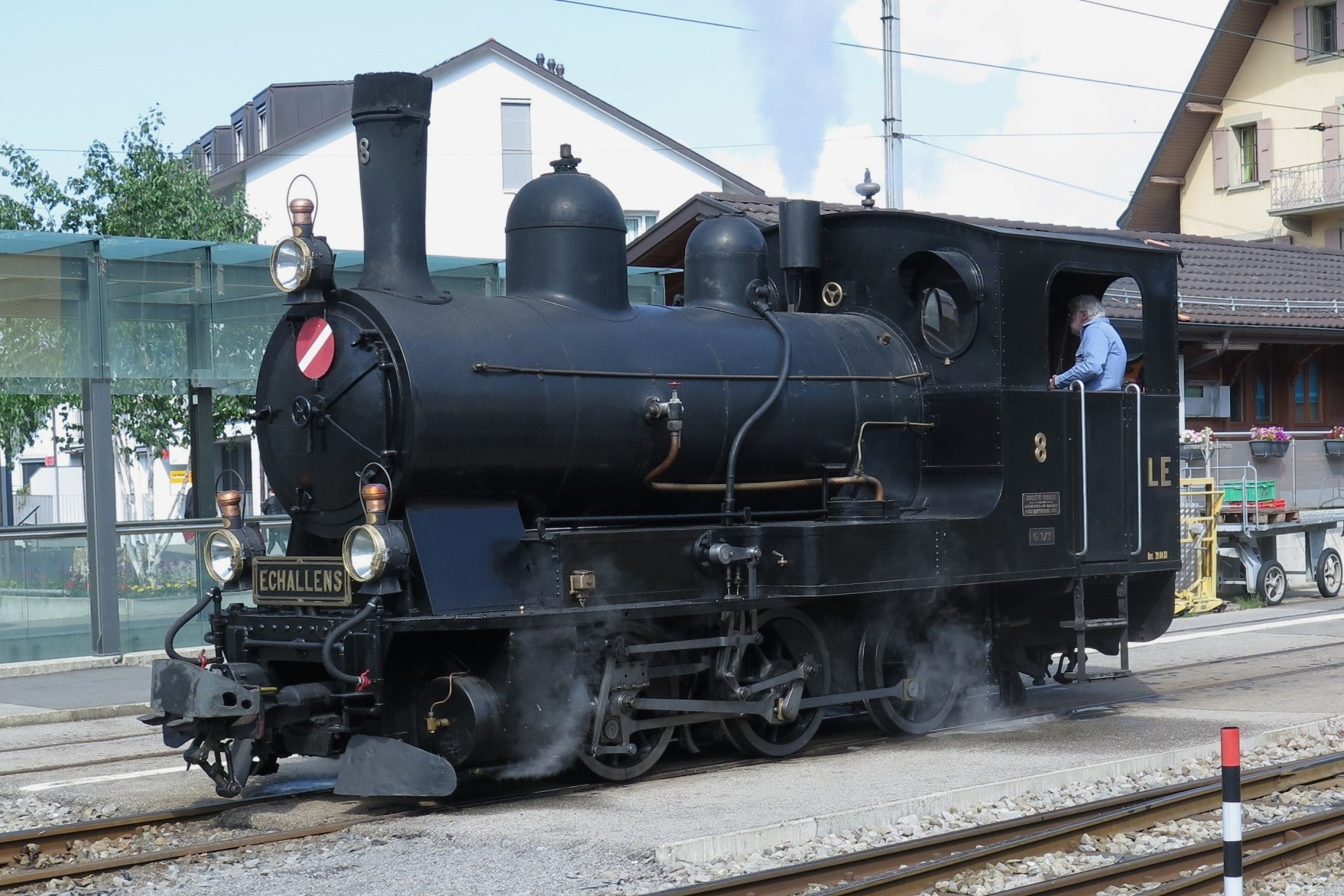
- Locomotive G 3/3 8 Échallens in 2015
Type and origin
- Power type: Steam
- Builder: SLM
- Serial number: 2095
- Build date: 1910
- Total produced: 1
Specifications
- Configuration
  - Whyte: 0-6-0T
- Gauge: 1,000 mm (3 ft 3 3/8 in)
- Driver dia.: 850 mm (2 ft 9 1/2 in)
- Length: 6,590 mm (21 ft 7 1/2 in)
- Boiler pressure: 13 standard atmospheres (1,300 kPa)
- Cylinders: 2
- Cylinder size: 420 mm × 310 mm (16.54 in × 12.20 in)
Performance figures
- Maximum speed: 30 kilometres per hour (19 mph)
Career
- Operators: LEB

LEB G 3/3 8 is a three-axle steam tank locomotive, supplied in 1910 by the Swiss Locomotive and Machine Works (SLM) in Winterthur for the Chemin de fer Lausanne-Échallens-Bercher (LEB). It carries the manufacturer's serial number 2095 and the name Échallens. It belongs to a sui generis class, but is based on a pair of locomotives (G 3/3 6-7) supplied to the LEB by the same builder in 1903 and 1905.

The locomotive is of metre gauge and is equipped with Walschaerts valve gear, Hardy vacuum brakes and screw brakes. Its boiler pressure is 13 standard atmospheres (1,300 kPa), and has two cylinders that measure 420 millimetres (17 in) in length with a diameter of 310 millimetres (12 in). It is 6.59 metres (21.6 ft) in length, and has a wheel diameter of 850 millimetres (33 in). It has a maximum speed of 30 kilometres per hour (19 mph).

Following the electrification of the LEB in 1936, the steam locomotive became surplus and was stored at Échallens. From 1941 to 1945, as a consequence of the Second World War, it was stationed at Montbovon station as a war reserve. From 1945 to 1977, it was owned and operated by the Renfer timber works, and used by them on the Biel Mett–Bözingen industrial railway near Biel.

In 1973, the locomotive briefly hauled steam trains on the LEB to celebrate the railway's 100th anniversary. It was returned permanently to the LEB in 1977, is based at Échallens, and used for special trains on the Lausanne–Échallens–Bercher railway line. It normally hauls a train made up of restored vintage rolling stock, including four wheel carriages C 10, B 11 and C 12, as well as the former postal van Zi 5, which has been converted into a bar car.

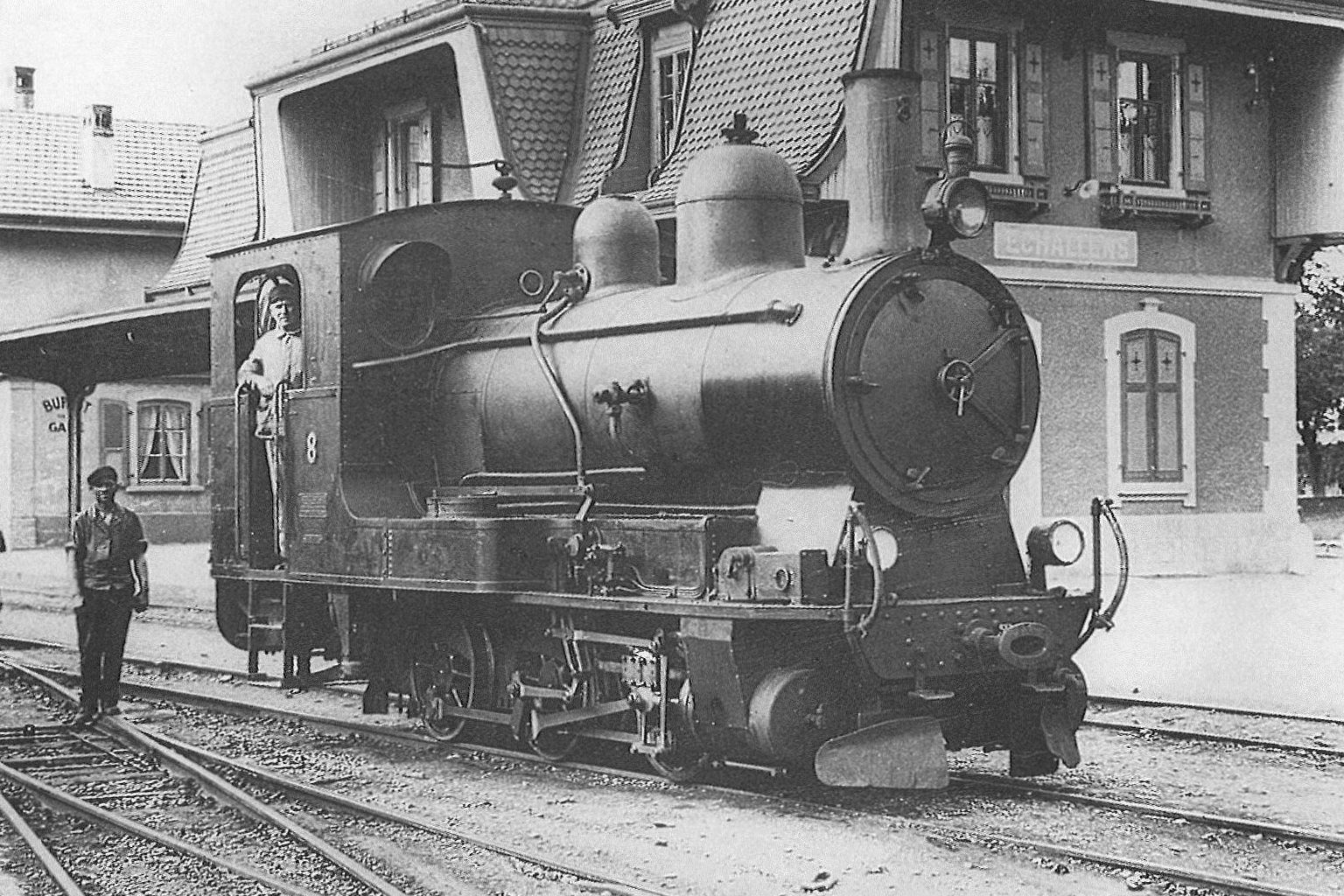
G 3/3 8 at Échallens in 1920

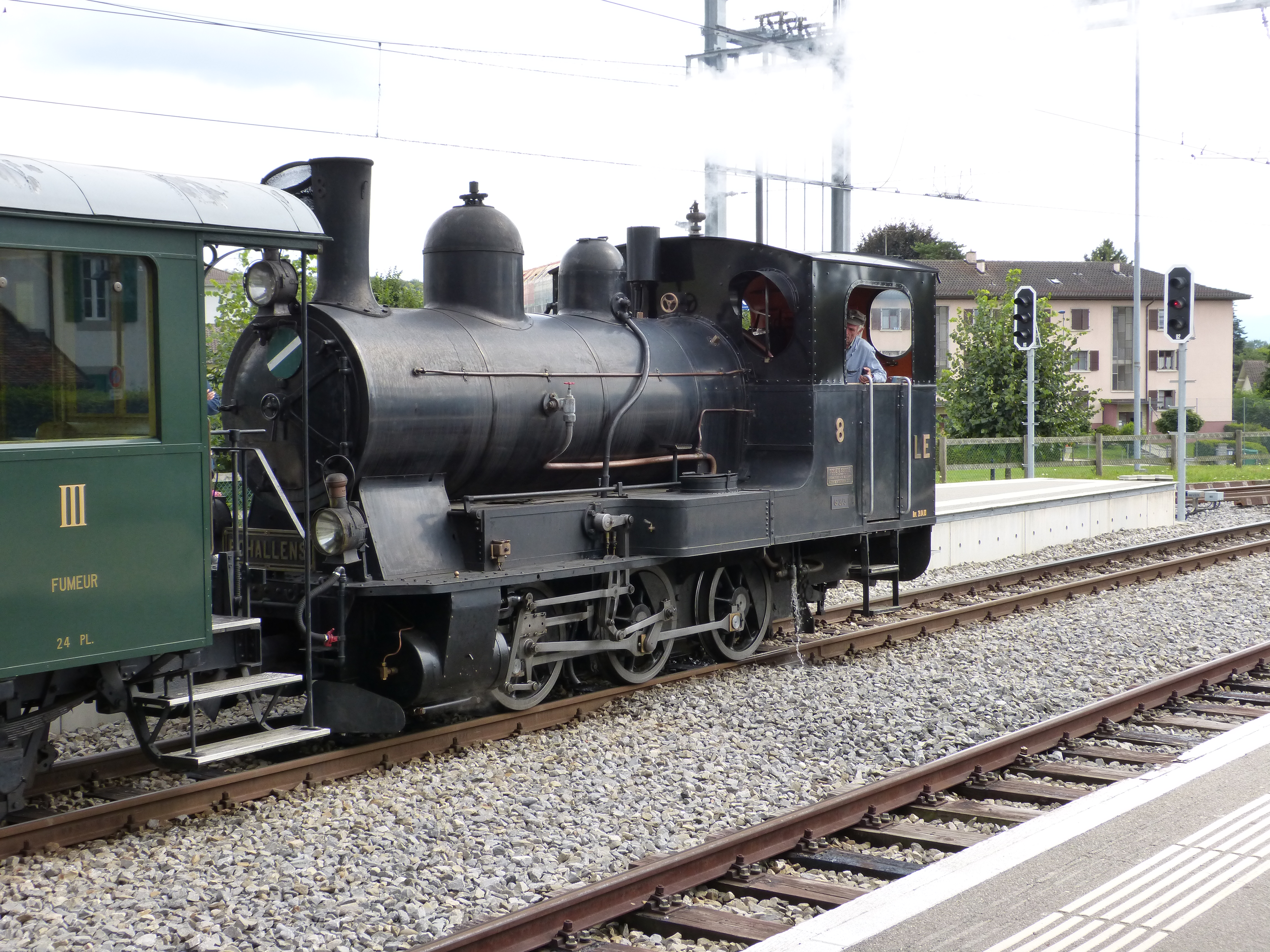
G 3/3 8 with a heritage train in 2013

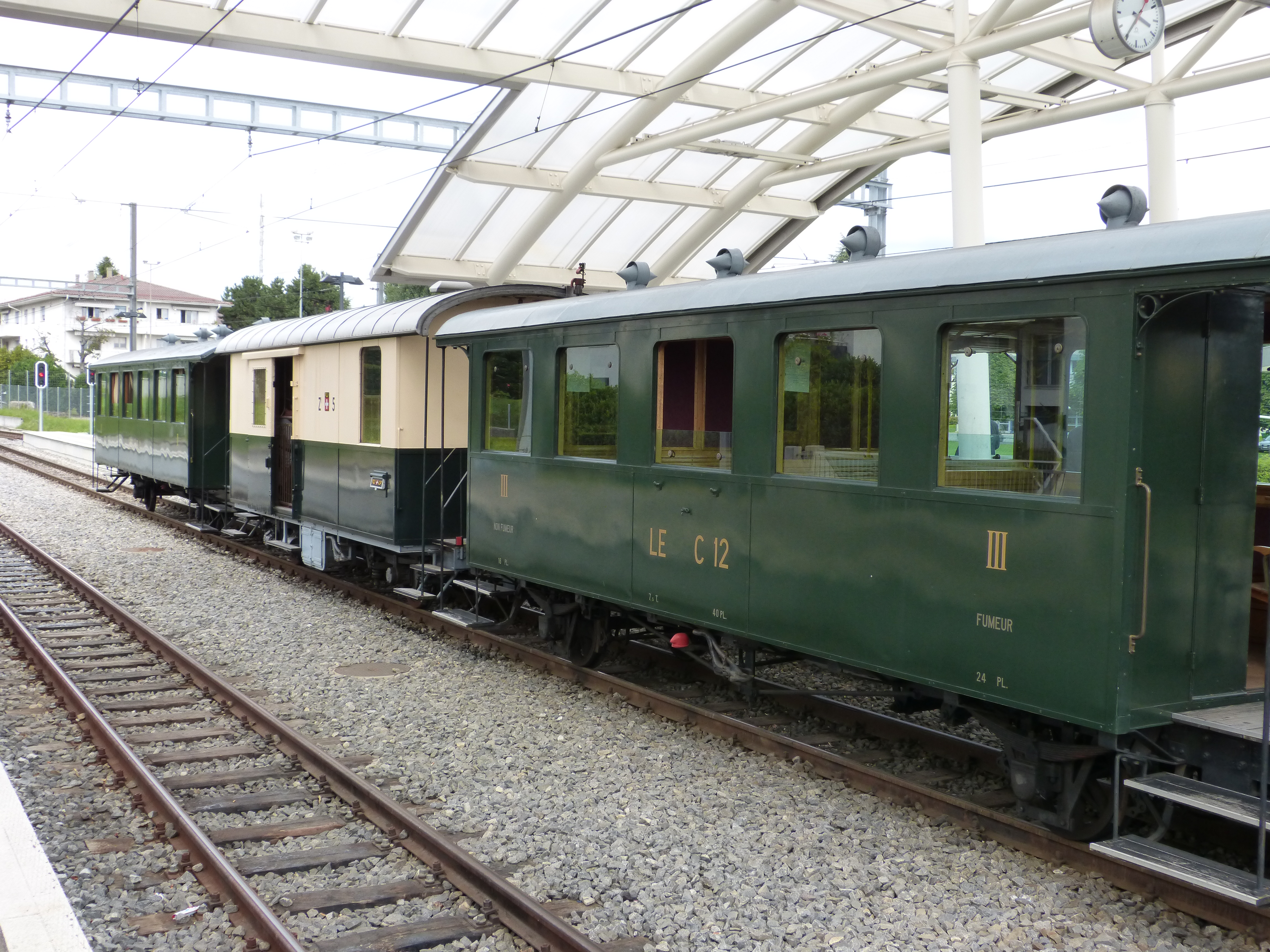
The historic train hauled by G 3/3 8 in 2013
