= LEB RBe 4/8 41–50 =

Class of Swiss multiple units

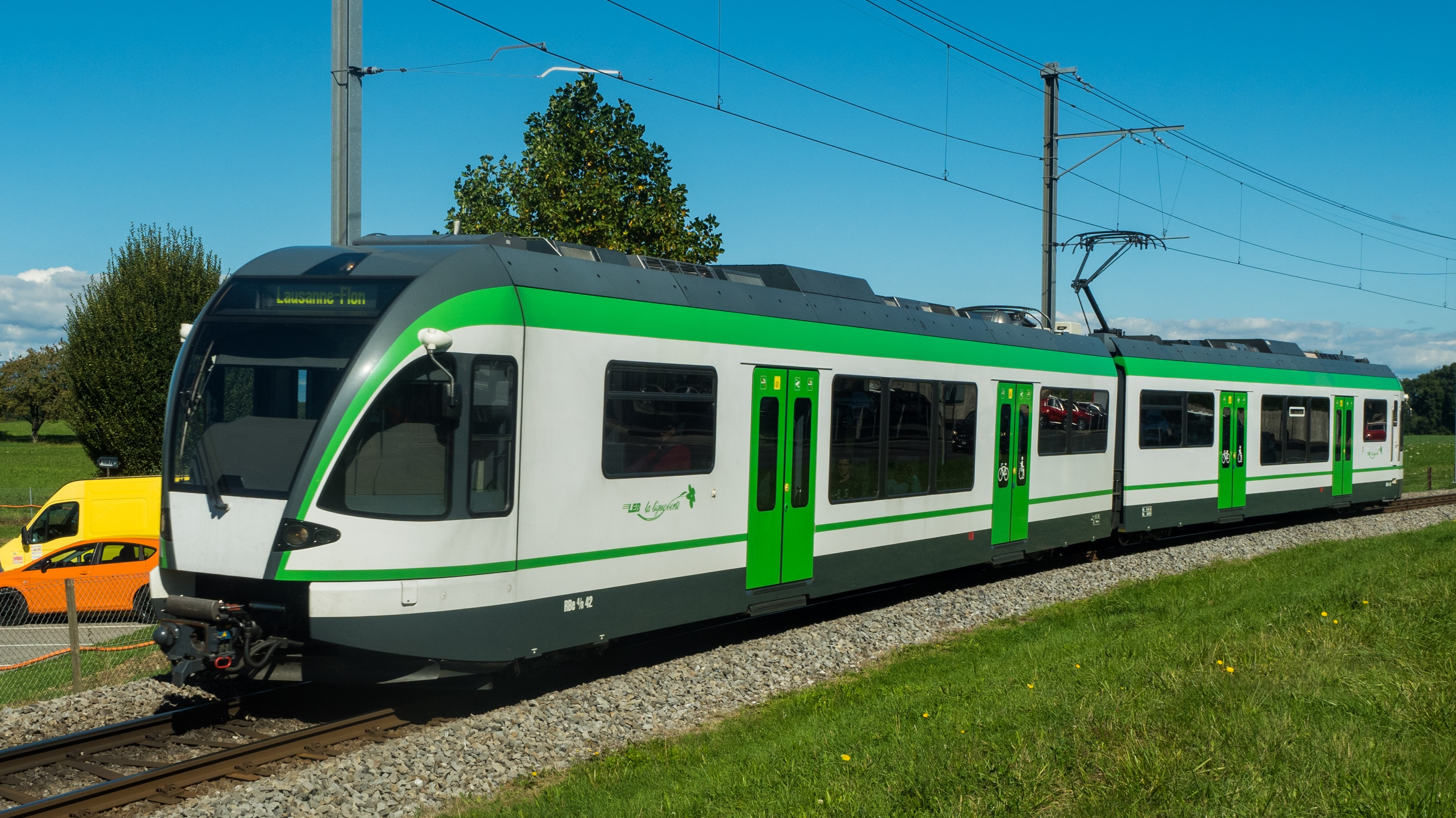
- RBe 4/4 42 near Etagnières station
- Manufacturer: Stadler Rail
- Built at: Altenrhein, Thal, St. Gallen
- Family name: FLIRT
- Constructed: 2010–2017
- Formation: 2-car sets
- Fleet numbers: 41–50
- Capacity: 306 passengers (118 seated)
- Operator: Chemin de fer Lausanne-Échallens-Bercher

Specifications
- Train length: 42.1 m (138 ft 1 1/2 in)
- Car length: 21.05 m (69 ft 3/4 in)
- Width: 2.65 m (8 ft 8 3/8 in)
- Height: 3.96 m (12 ft 11 7/8 in)
- Floor height: 580–1,000 mm (1 ft 10 7/8 in – 3 ft 3 3/8 in)
- Maximum speed: 120 km/h (75 mph)
- Electric systems: 1,500 V DC (nominal) from overhead catenary
- Current collection: Pantograph
- UIC classification: Bo′2′+2′Bo′
- Track gauge: 1,000 mm (3 ft 3 3/8 in) metre gauge

LEB RBe 4/8 41–50 is a class of ten two-car low-floor metre gauge multiple units, operated by the Chemin de fer Lausanne-Échallens-Bercher (LEB) and used on their Lausanne–Échallens–Bercher railway line.

The units were built by Stadler Rail, at their Altenrhein factory, to a non-articulated design unique to the LEB, albeit with some similarities to the articulated FLIRT. The units were ordered and delivered in two tranches, with the first six units (41–46) ordered in 2008 and delivered in 2010; the second tranche (46–50) was delivered in 2017.

The units are 42.1 metres (138 ft) long, 2.655 metres (8 ft 8.5 in) wide, and accommodate 306 passengers, of whom 118 are seated. The low-floor area makes up more than 60% of the car's total floor area, and their four doors on each side are within this area, with an entrance height of 580 millimetres (23 in). They have a maximum speed of 120 kilometres per hour (75 mph), although that speed is not currently attainable on the LEB.

This class, together with six three-section low-floor articulated railcars (Be 4/8 61-66) delivered by Stadler Rail between 2019 and 2020, have replaced all previous classes in normal service.
