= Lausanne-Chauderon railway station =

Railway station in Lausanne, Switzerland

Lausanne-Chauderon
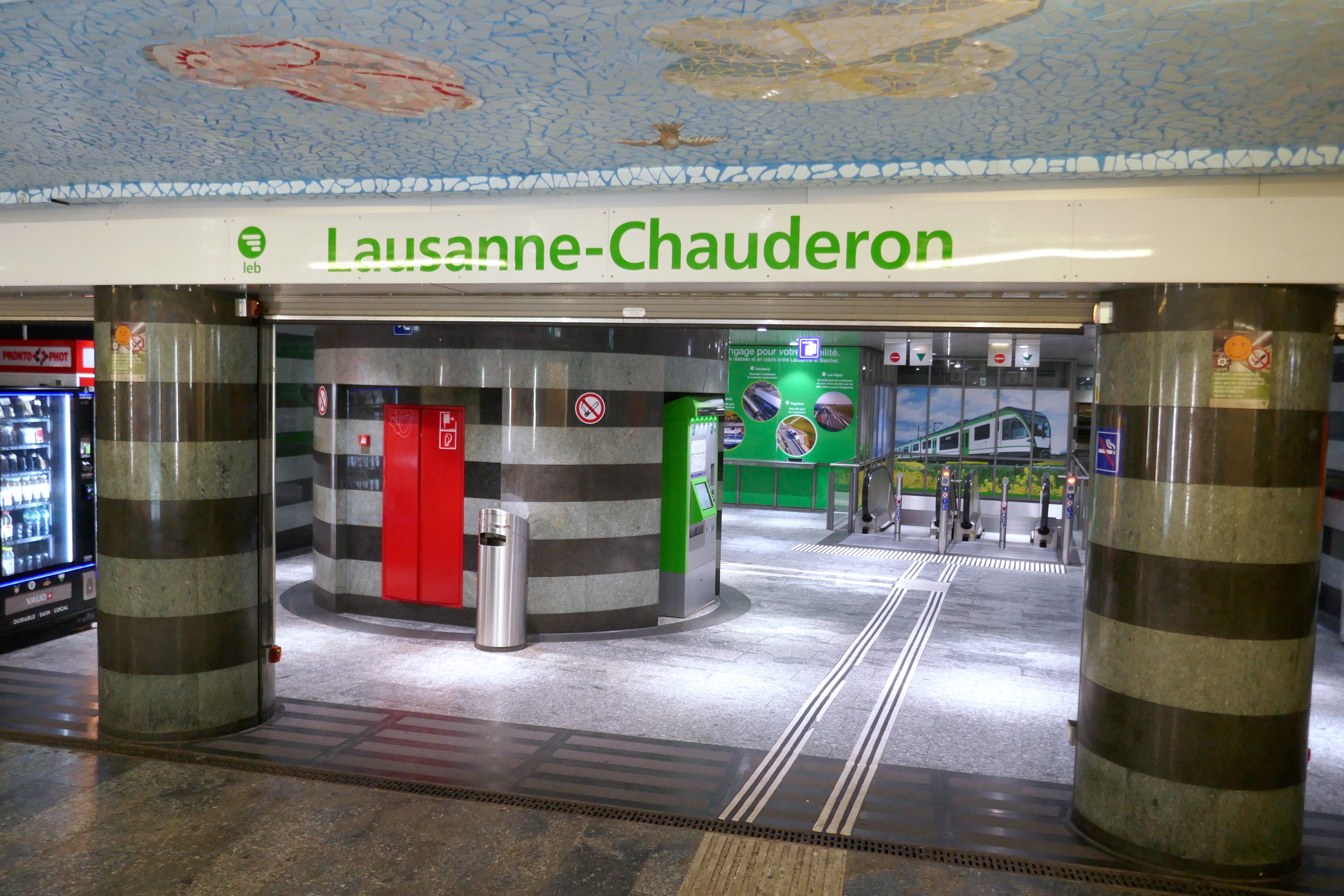
- The station entrance in 2024

General information
- Location: Lausanne, Vaud; Switzerland
- Coordinates: 46°31′24″N 6°37′34″E
- Elevation: 471 m (1,545 ft)
- Owner: Chemin de fer Lausanne-Échallens-Bercher
- Line: Lausanne–Bercher line
- Distance: 0.5 km (0.31 mi) from Lausanne-Flon
- Platforms: 1 island platform
- Tracks: 2
- Train operators: Chemin de fer Lausanne-Échallens-Bercher
- Connections: tl bus and trolleybus lines

Construction
- Accessible: Yes

Other information
- Station code: 8501160 (LSCH)
- Fare zone: 11 (mobilis)

History
- Opened: 5 November 1873
- Rebuilt: 28 May 1995 (placed underground)
- Electrified: 10 February 1899 (for TL trams} 7 December 1935 (for LEB trains)

Services
Preceding station	LEB	Following station
Union-Prilly towards Echallens or Bercher	R20	Lausanne-Flon Terminus
Location

Lausanne-Chauderon railway station (French: Gare de Lausanne-Chauderon) is an underground railway station in the centre of the municipality of Lausanne, in the Swiss canton of Vaud. It is located on the 1,000 mm (3 ft 3 3/8 in) Lausanne–Bercher line of the Chemin de fer Lausanne-Échallens-Bercher (LEB).

The station is situated under the Place Chauderon, and it is accessed from a public pedestrian subway that connects the north and south side of the square. The subway is decorated with colorful murals created between 2013 and 2015 by the "Embellimur" association, with support from the Vaud Establishment for the Reception of Migrants (EVAM) as part of a public works project.

== History ==
Chauderon station opened to service on 5 November 1873, as the Lausanne terminus of the first section of the LEB to Cheseaux station. The outer terminus was extended to Échallens station in 1874, and to Bercher station in 1889, but Chauderon remained the inner terminus until 2000.

As originally built, Chauderon was a surface station, with a wooden station building. It was situated about 350 metres (1,150 ft) to the west of the current station site, on the site of what is now the Parc de la Brouette. The line's depot was also originally sited here, but it was destroyed in a fire in 1907 and never rebuilt, being relocated to Échallens station instead.

In 1899, the Lausanne Tramway Company (TL) opened an electric tramway to Prilly that shared the LEB's tracks on the section between the Chauderon and the former Montétan stations. LEB's trains in the station were electrified in 1935. TL's trams continued to use the station until 1964, when the tram service was discontinued.

The surface station, and its wooden building, survived until 1995, when the station was moved underground and the original station razed. In 2000, a tunnelled extension to a new inner terminus at Flon station opened, permitting interchange with the Lausanne Metro. In 2022, the line in the opposite direction was placed into tunnel as far as Union-Prilly station.

== Services ==
As of the December 2023 timetable change, the following services stop at Lausanne-Chauderon:

- Regio: service every fifteen minutes between Lausanne-Flon and Echallens, with every other train continuing from Echallens to Bercher.

== Gallery ==
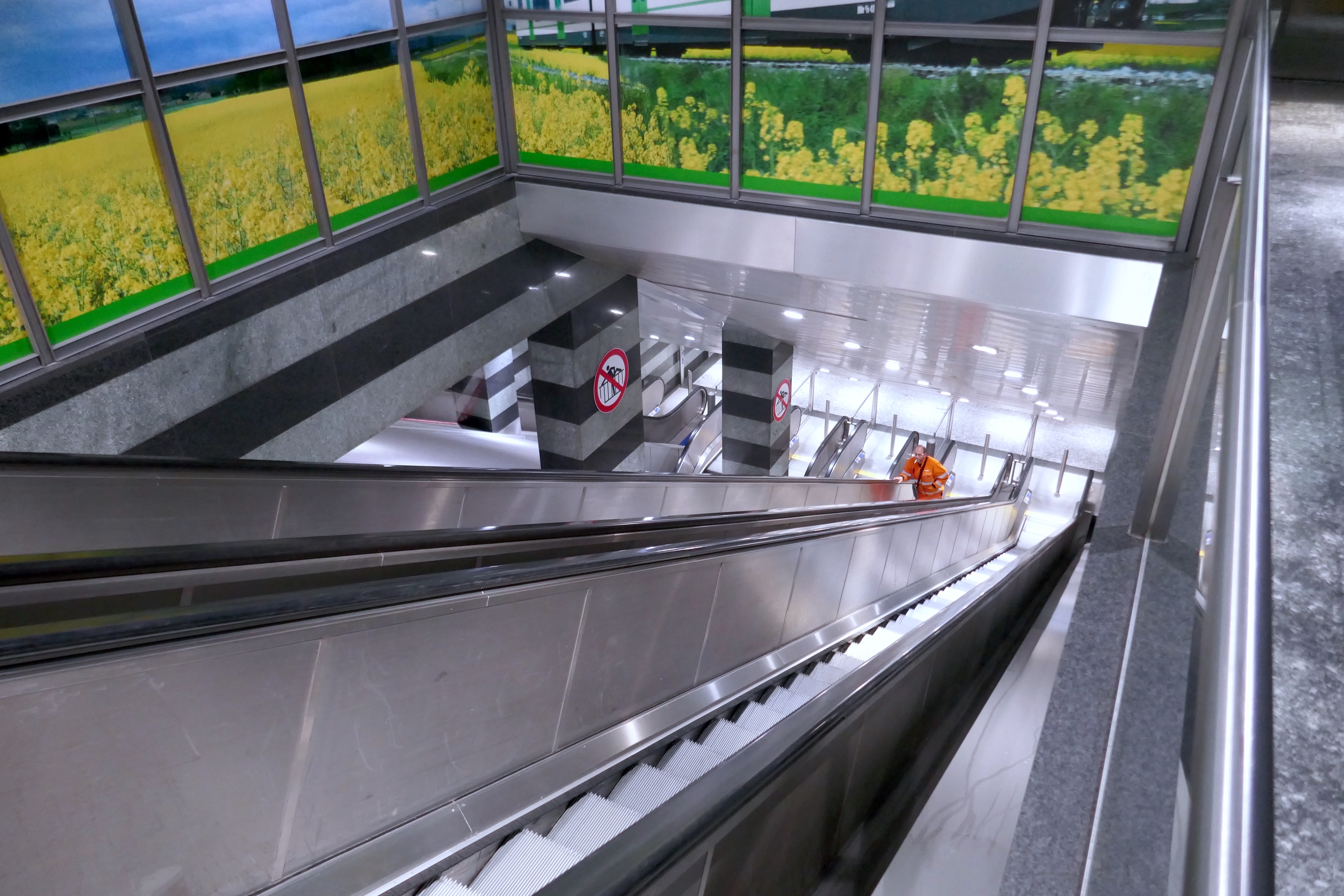
The escalators

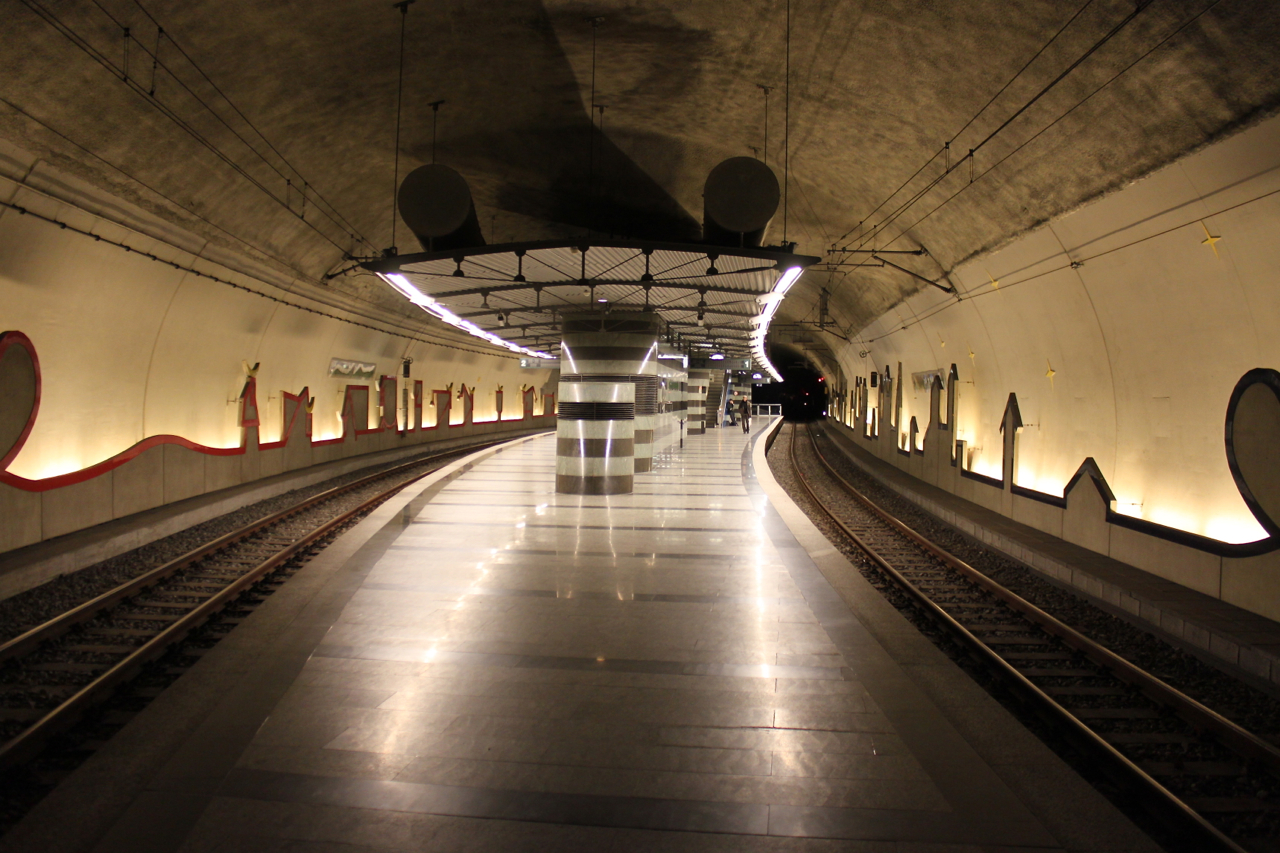
The platforms

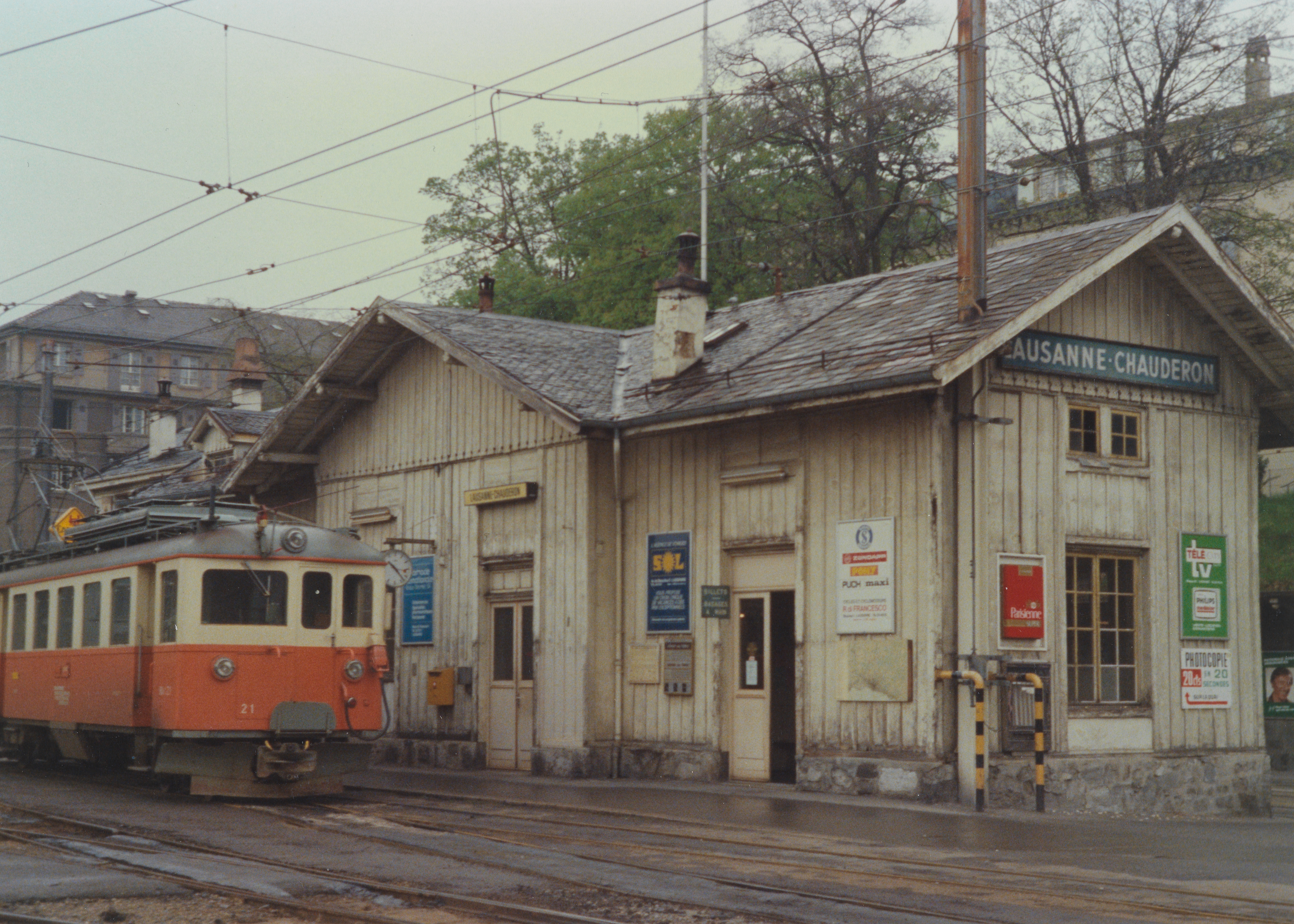
The old station in 1981
