= Lausanne–Échallens–Bercher line =

Narrow gauge railway line in canton of Vaud, Switzerland

Coordinates: 46°38′22″N 6°37′59″E

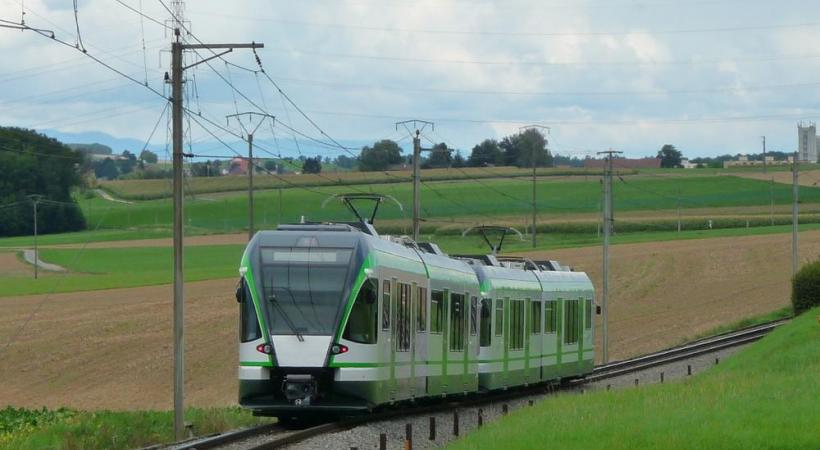

Overview
- Owner: Chemin de fer Lausanne-Échallens-Bercher
- Locale: Vaud
- Termini: Lausanne-Flon; Bercher
- Stations: 19
- Website: https://www.leb.ch

Service
- Type: narrow gauge commuter rail

History
- Opened: 4 November 1873

Technical
- Track length: 23.6 km (14.7 mi)
- Track gauge: 1,000 mm (3 ft 3 3/8 in)
- Electrification: 1500 V DC
- Maximum incline: 6%

The Lausanne–Échallens–Bercher line is a railway line in the canton of Vaud in Switzerland. The line connects the city of Lausanne with Bercher via Echallens. It is owned and operated by the Chemin de fer Lausanne-Échallens-Bercher (LEB) company, which was the result of a merger of the separate Chemin de fer Lausanne-Échallens (LE) and Compagnie du Central Vaudois. It is under the operational management of Transports publics de la région lausannoise.

The line is notable as it was the first metre gauge railway to built in Switzerland, in 1873, and the forerunner of many later such lines.

== History ==
Old logo.

=== The initial line ===
In 1860, an abortive plan was put forward for a standard gauge railway from Lausanne to Payerne via Cheseaux-sur-Lausanne, Échallens, Bercher and Demoret. In 1871, an application was made for a concession to build a line from Lausanne to Échallens using a monorail system designed by Jean Larmanjat. The following year, the concession was granted to the Lausanne-Échallens company on the condition that the line should be built as a conventional two-rail railway.

The line was the first metre gauge railway to be built in Switzerland. It was built using equipment from the temporary Mont Cenis Pass Railway that crossed the Mont Cenis Pass between France and Italy until the opening of the Mont Cenis Tunnel in 1871. After an initial test train ran between Chauderon and Prilly-Chasseur stations on 3 October 1873, the first section of line came into service from Lausanne to Cheseaux on 5 November 1873. The line through to Échallens station opened in June 1874, with the line reaching its terminal station via a roadside alignment from the east.

The line was operated by steam locomotives, the first two of which (G 2/2 1&2) were British built four wheeled tank locomotives that came from the Mont Cenis Pass Railway. These proved to be less than successful, with 1 sold in 1874 and 2 in 1880. Further locomotives to the same layout were supplied in 1874 by Krauss (G 2/2 1) and Schneider-Creusot (G 2/2 3&4). These survived until 1895, 1909 and 1912 respectively.

=== Extension to Bercher ===
In 1886, an application was made for a concession to build a line from Échallens to Bercher, principally to serve a condensed milk plant that Nestlé had opened in the latter town. The concession was awarded to a legally separate entity, the Compagnie du Central Vaudois. The extension opened on 24 November 1889, and operations were managed by the LE company. The Nestlé plant was linked to Bercher station by an aerial cableway. Like the LE, the new line entered Échallens station from the east, requiring any through trains to reverse direction.

In 1899, the Lausanne Tramway Company (TL) opened an electric tramway to Prilly that shared the LE's tracks on the section between the Chauderon and Montétan stations, with the common section electrified at 550/600 V DC using overhead lines to power the TL trams. In 1908, the line between Assens and Échallens stations was diverted so as to enter the latter station from the west, thus obviating the need to reverse through trains. By 1913, the finances of the Compagnie du Central Vaudois were causing concern, and it was merged into the LE, which thus became today's LEB.

Despite the electrification of part of the line, LEB trains continued to be steam hauled throughout their journey. Two six-wheel tank locomotives (G 3/3 2&5) were supplied in 1888 and 1890 by SACM, and named Échallens and Bercher respectively. These were followed by G 3/3 6-7, supplied by SLM in 1903 and 1905, and named Gros-de-Vaud and Talent respectively, and by the more powerful G 3/3 8, also supplied by SLM and named Échallens. In 1920/1, the LEB bought Mallets G 2×2/2 1-3, built in 1893 for the Yverdon–Ste-Croix railway. Locomotive 5 survives on the Blonay–Chamby museum railway, whilst 8 survives on the LEB for use on special trains.

=== Electrification ===
In 1933, plans were submitted to electrify the LEB. By December 1935, the first electric trains were running and steam locomotives were withdrawn from regular service by the end of that year. The superior acceleration of the electric trains enabled the opening of a number of new stations on the line. Electrification was undertaken at 1500 V DC using overhead lines, with trains able to operate on both that voltage and the lower voltage of the section shared with TL. However the TL trams ceased operating in 1964.

For the electrification, SWS supplied four new railcars (CFe 4/4 21-24), with a fifth (25) in 1947; these were subsequently renumbered as BDe 4/4 21-25. Initially the railcars hauled steam-era four-wheeled coaches, but these were replaced by bogie trailers between 1944 and 1957. In 1966, SWS supplied railcars Be 4/4 26-27 together with matching trailers and driving trailers. In 1985, three new two-car multiple units (Be 4/8 31-33) entered service, followed by three more in 1991 (34-36). All six were built by ACMV, for the mechanical parts, and ABB, for the electrical parts.

=== Tunnelling and modernisation ===
An extension of the line from Chauderon station further into Lausanne's city centre was first considered in 1957, but work did not get underway until the 1990s. Chauderon station was moved underground and the original station razed in 1995. Trains continued to terminate at Chauderon until 2000, when a tunnelled extension to Flon station opened, permitting interchange with the Lausanne Metro. In 2013, Transports publics de la région lausannoise took over operational management of the LEB.

In May 2022, a new tunnel section between Chauderon and Union-Prilly stations was opened, having being under construction for five years at a cost of SFr136m. The new tunnel replaced the street running line between the two stations, once shared with TL trams, and resulted in the closure of Montétan station on the old line. It completes a double-track alignment from Lausanne-Flon to Union-Prilly, and is intended to increase capacity and reliability and avoid road accidents.

In 2010, Stadler Rail delivered six two-car low-floor multiple units (RBe 4/8 41-46), with four more (47-50) delivered in 2017. In 2019/20, the same company delivered six three-section low-floor articulated units (Be 4/8 61-66), with a further four ordered in 2024. The two classes of Stadler units replaced all previous classes in normal service.

== Operation ==
=== Route ===
The line originates in the centre of Lausanne at Flon station, situated at an elevation of 472 metres (1,549 ft) above sea level. This station also serves as the terminus of Lausanne Metro Line M1 and an intermediate stop on Line M2. From Flon, the line proceeds northwest through a tunnel as far as Union-Prilly station, with an intermediate stop at Chauderon station within the tunnel. The line from Flon to just beyond Union-Prilly is double-track throughout.

From beyond Union-Prilly to, and including, Assens station, the route is predominantly roadside and single track, incorporating 10 stations and 5 passing loops. Between Union-Prilly and Cery–Fleur-de-Lys station, the line ascends at a gradient of 35‰. A steeper section follows between Jouxtens-Mézery station and the former Le Lussex station, where the gradient reaches 40‰ before continuing on a comparatively level alignment. Just before Cheseaux station, the line crosses the Mèbre river. Just north of Etagnières station, the line crosses from the river basin of the Rhone to that of the Rhine, and the surroundings become progressively more rural.

North of Assens station, the line diverges from the main road and runs on its own single track right of way. There are 6 further stations and 3 further loops. The line’s operational centre, including its depot and workshops, is located at Echallens station. Shortly thereafter, the route crosses the Talent river via a bridge and continues in a north-easterly direction. Its highest point, at 652 metres (2,139 ft) above sea level, lies between Sugnens and Fey stations. The line terminates at Bercher station, at an elevation of 627 metres (2,057 ft) above sea level.

=== Infrastructure ===
The line is 23.6 km (14.7 mi) long. It is equipped with metre gauge (1,000 mm / 3 ft 3 3/8 in gauge) track throughout, and is electrified at 1500 V DC, using an overhead line.

=== Rolling stock ===
The line uses the following powered rolling stock:

Image	Numbers	Notation	Year	Notes
	1	Tm 2/2	1966	A four wheel rail tractor built by Diema/Deutz for industrial use in Düsseldorf. Acquired by the LEB in 1984. Used in the line's Echallens depot.
	2	Tm 2/2	1988	A four wheel rail tractor built by Robert Aebi Gruppe/Cummins for the LEB. Used for infrastructure maintenance.
	8	G 3/3	1910	A three-axle steam tank locomotive, buit by SLM for the LEB. Retained for use on special trains.
	25	Are 4/4	1947	A bogie railcar, buit by SWS for the LEB. Originally classified as CFe 4/4 but subsequently reclassified BDe 4/4. After being retired from normal service, this car was rebuilt as a restaurant car and again reclassified Are 4/4. Retained for use on special trains.
	41–50	RBe 4/8	2010–17	A class of ten two-car low-floor multiple units, built by Stadler Rail to a design unique to the LEB. Delivered in two tranches, in 2010 (41–46) and 2017 (46–50).
	61–66	Be 4/8	2019–20	A class of six three-section low-floor articulated units, built by Stadler Rail to a design derived from the Worbla units supplied to Regionalverkehr Bern-Solothurn. A further four similar units were ordered in 2024, to be delivered in 2027.

=== Services ===
Trains run between Lausanne-Flon and Bercher every 30 minutes from early morning until late evening on every day of the week. This services is augmented to provide a 15 minute interval service between Lausanne-Flon and Échallens for most of the day on Mondays to Saturdays. Normal journey times are 27–28 minutes between Lausanne-Flon and Échallens, and 41–42 minutes between Lausanne-Flon and Bercher.

== Future ==
The tunnel between Lausanne-Flon and Union-Prilly stations is intended to permit the operation of up to eight trains per hour in each direction on the urban section as far as Cheseaux-sur-Lausanne, although currently the service only operates every 15 minutes on this section. It is planned that services will be increased to run every 10 min by 2035.

A new 1-kilometre (0.62 mi) long tunnel is planned to run under the village of Étagnières, which will incorporate a new Etagnières station, and a new double-track section towards Assens station. In preparation for this, the existing station has been relocated to a temporary site.
