= Echallens railway station =

Railway station in Échallens, Vaud, Switzerland

Echallens
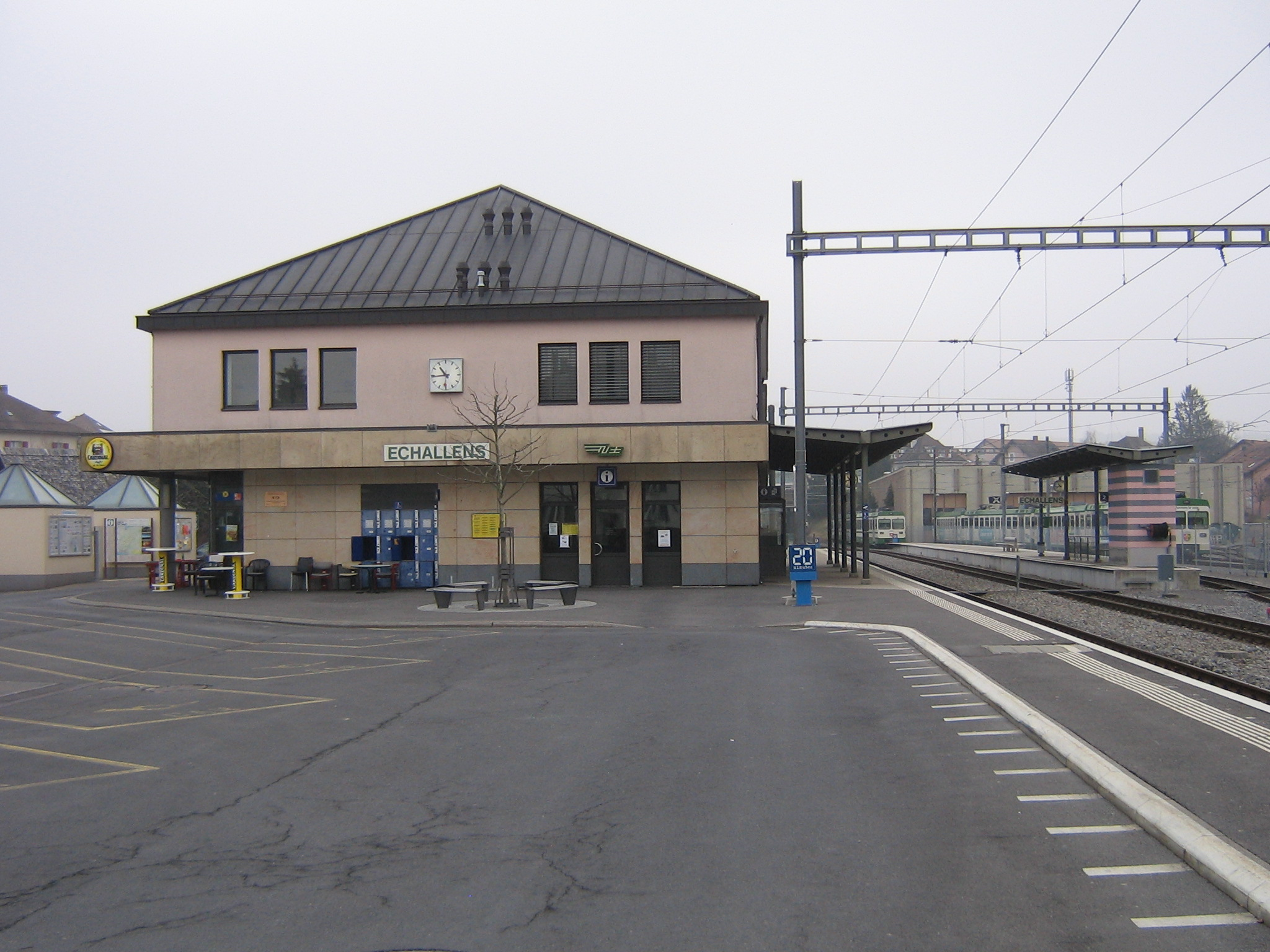
- The station in 2011

General information
- Location: Échallens, Vaud; Switzerland
- Coordinates: 46°38′22″N 6°37′57″E
- Elevation: 617 m (2,024 ft)
- Owner: Chemin de fer Lausanne-Échallens-Bercher
- Line: Lausanne–Bercher line
- Distance: 15.1 km (9.4 mi) from Lausanne-Flon
- Platforms: 1 island platform; 1 side platform
- Tracks: 3
- Train operators: Chemin de fer Lausanne-Échallens-Bercher
- Connections: CarPostal SA bus lines

Construction
- Accessible: Yes

Other information
- Station code: 8501173 (ECH)
- Fare zone: 50 and 51 (mobilis)

History
- Opened: 2 June 1874
- Rebuilt: 24 November 1889 (as a junction station); 10 October 1908 (as a through station); 1998 (complete rebuild)
- Electrified: 7 December 1935

Services
Preceding station	LEB	Following station
Sur Roche towards Bercher	R20	Assens towards Lausanne-Flon
Terminus	R20	Assens towards Lausanne-Flon
Location

Echallens railway station (French: Gare d'Echallens) is a railway station in the municipality of Échallens, in the Swiss canton of Vaud. It is located on the 1,000 mm (3 ft 3 3/8 in) Lausanne–Bercher line of the Chemin de fer Lausanne-Échallens-Bercher (LEB).

The depot for the LEB is located at the station and approximately half of all trains from Lausanne-Flon terminate here. There are two through tracks and one terminal track, each with a platform face provided by one side platform and one island platform. There are also a number of sidings within the depot.

== History ==
Echallens station opened to service on 2 June 1874, as the outer terminus of the Lausanne-Échallens line from Chauderon station. The line was built by the Chemin de fer Lausanne-Échallens company (LE) and, as originally built, the line followed the road from Assens station, reaching Echallens station from the east.

On 24 November 1889, the extension from Échallens to Bercher opened. This was built by a separate company, the Compagnie du Central Vaudois, although operations were managed by the LE company. Like the LE itself, the new line entered Échallens station from the east, requiring any through trains to reverse direction in what was still a terminal station.

In 1908, the line from Assens was diverted so as to enter Echallens station from the west, converting it into a through station and obviating the need to for trains to reverse. In 1913, the LE and the Central Vaudois were merged to create the LEB. The line through the station was electrified in 1935.

Construction of a new workshop building in the depot started in 1985, and it was inaugurated on 30 October 1986. In the late 1990s, the station was completely demolished and rebuilt, primarily for safety reasons. The station in its current form was inaugurated in 1998.

== Services ==
As of the December 2023 timetable change, the following services stop at Echallens:

- Regio: service every fifteen minutes to Lausanne-Flon and every half-hour to Bercher.

== Gallery ==
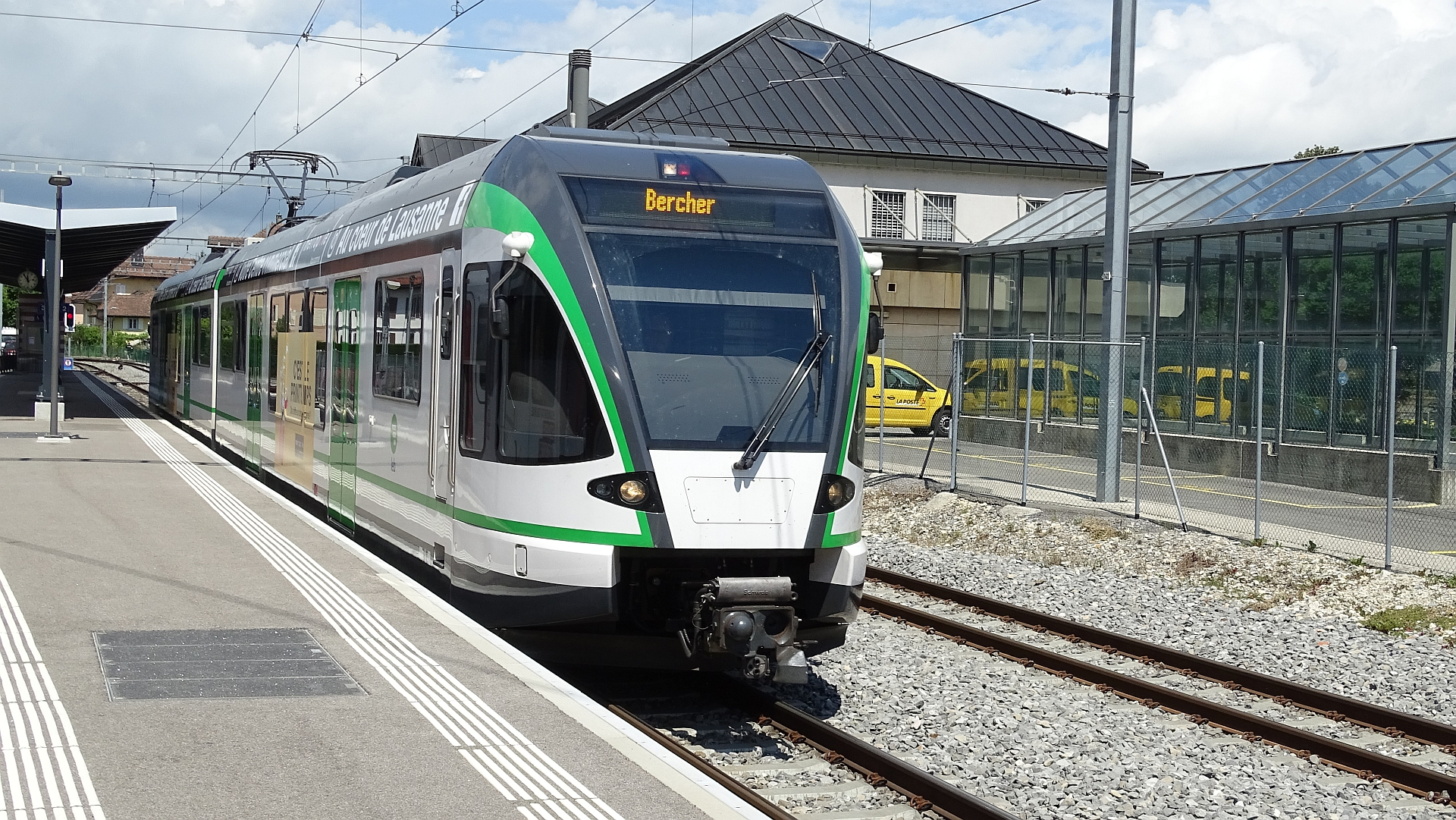
Train in the platforms

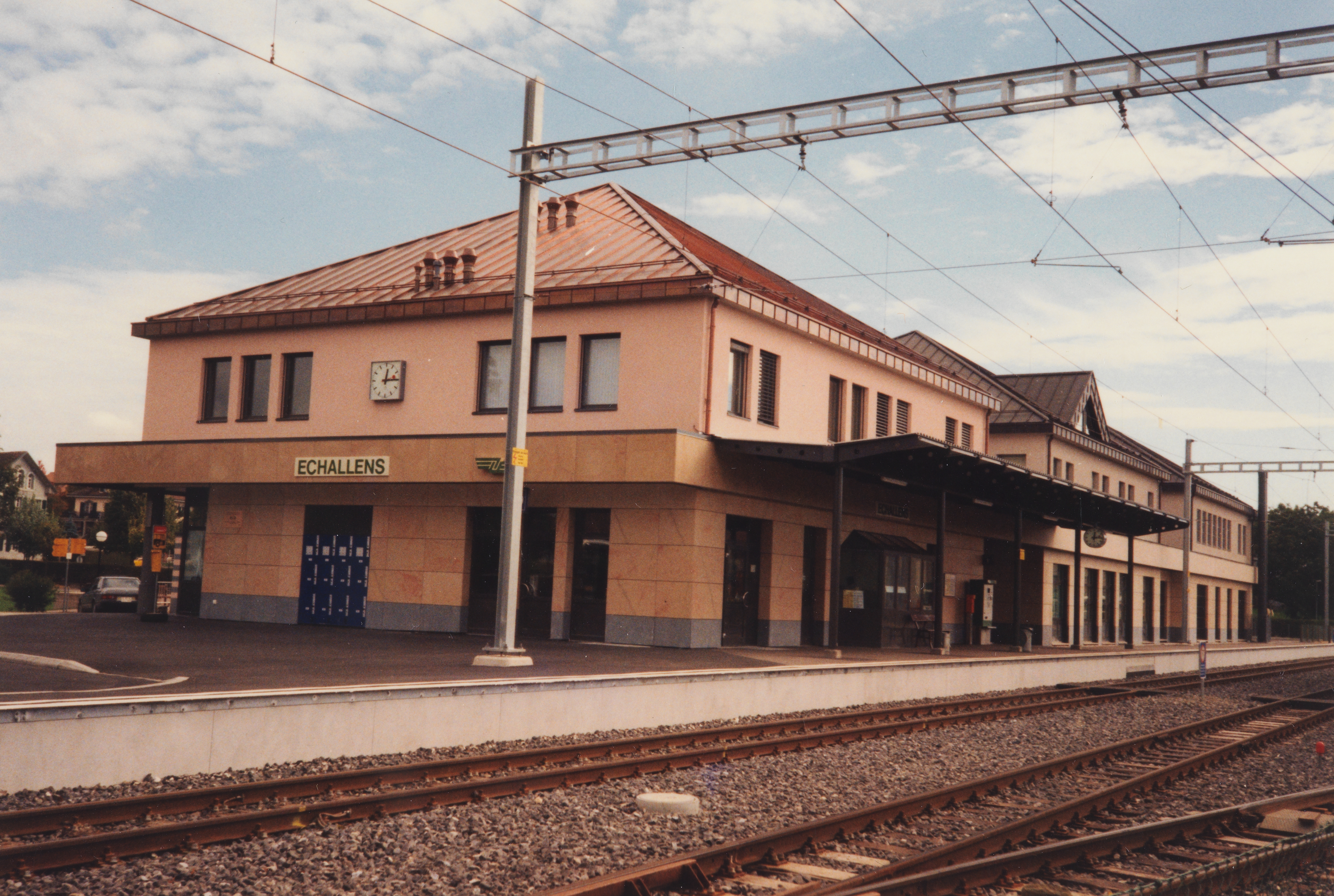
The newly built station building in 1998

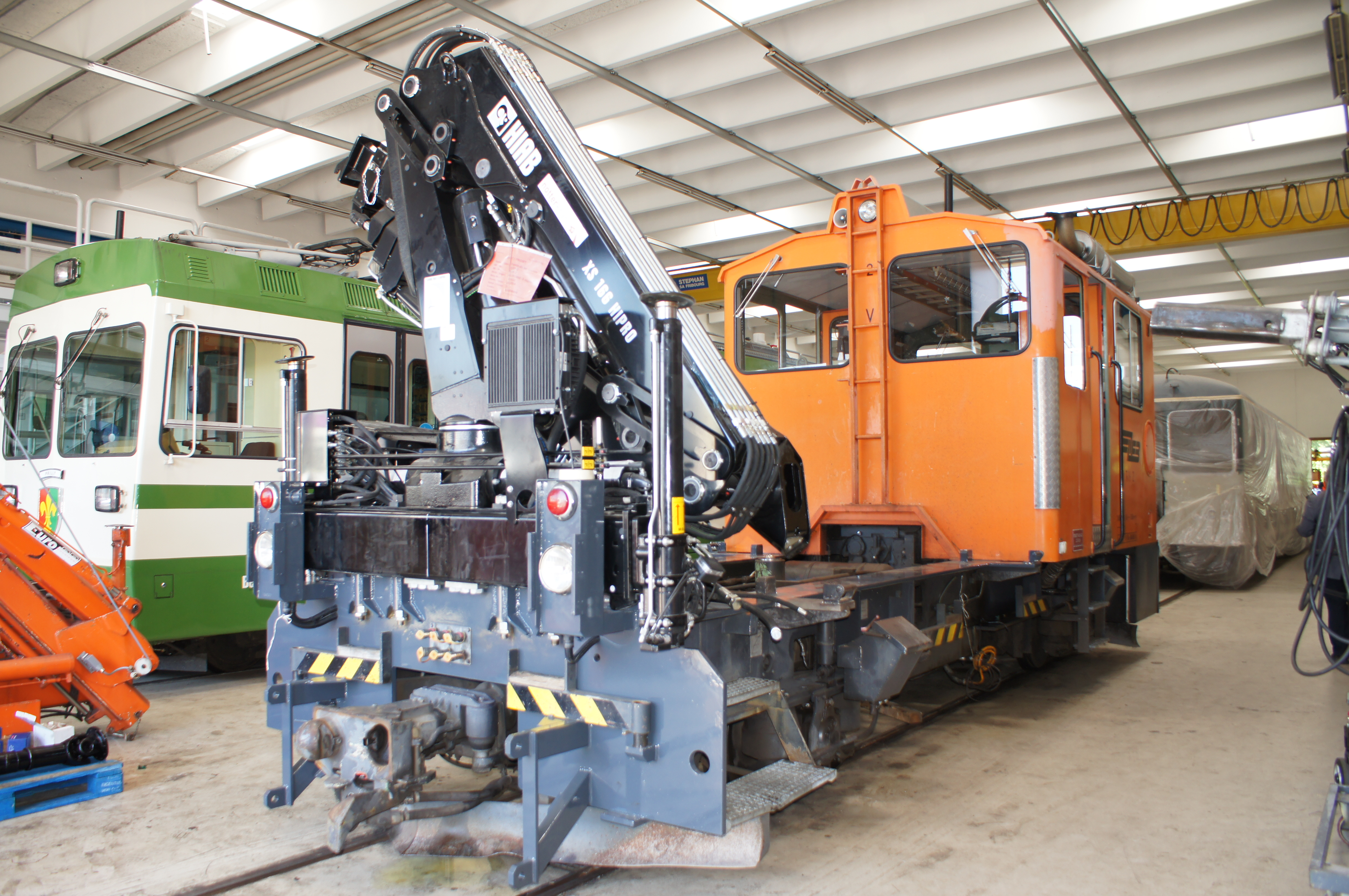
The interior of the workshop
