= Bercher railway station =

Railway station in Bercher, Switzerland

Bercher
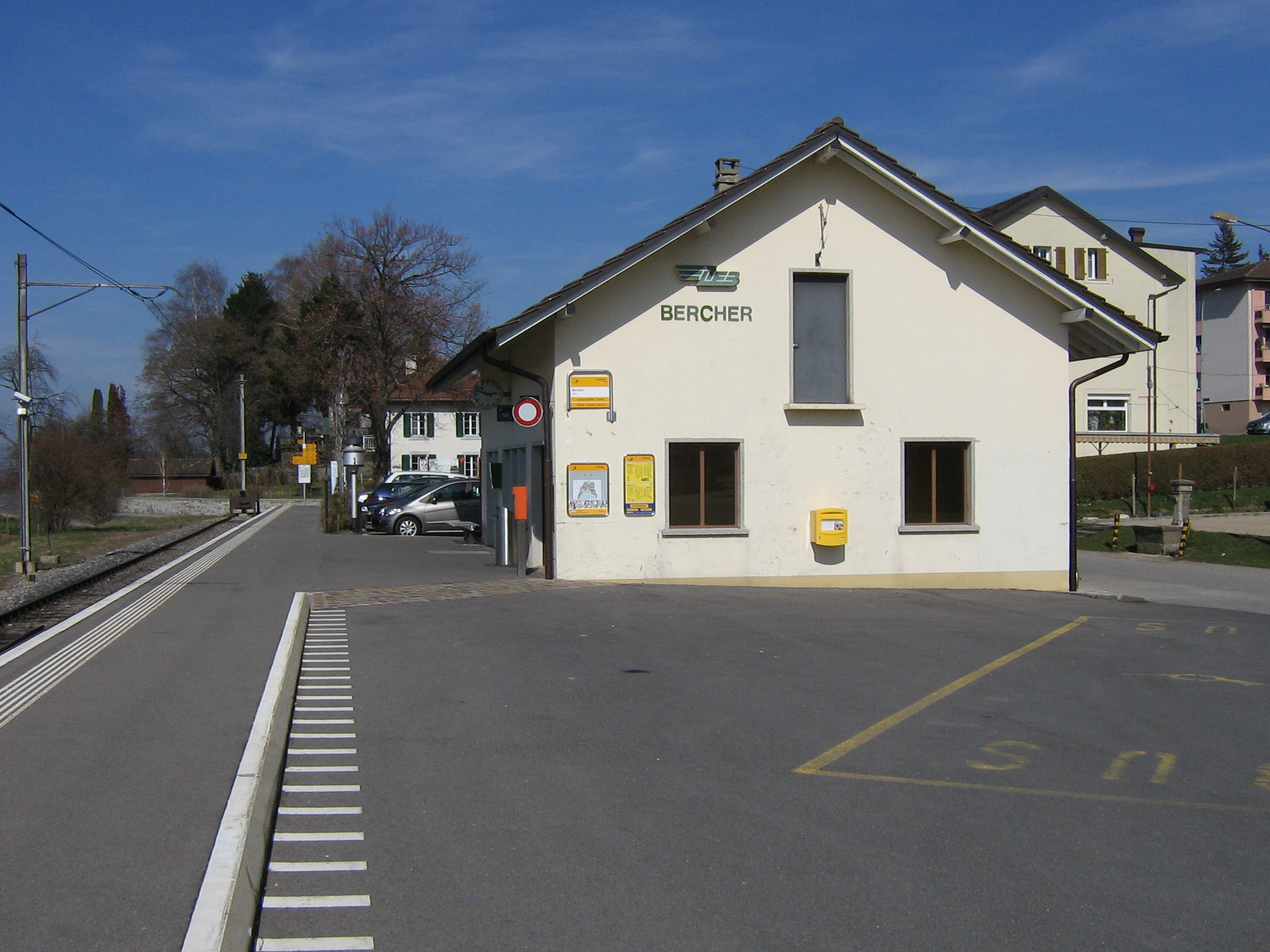
- The station in 2011

General information
- Location: Bercher, Vaud; Switzerland
- Coordinates: 46°41′34″N 6°42′13″E
- Elevation: 627 m (2,057 ft)
- Owner: Chemin de fer Lausanne-Échallens-Bercher
- Line: Lausanne–Bercher line
- Distance: 23.7 km (14.7 mi) from Lausanne-Flon
- Platforms: 2 side platforms
- Tracks: 2
- Train operators: Chemin de fer Lausanne-Échallens-Bercher
- Connections: PostBus routes 430, 662 and 665

Construction
- Accessible: Yes

Other information
- Station code: 8501177 (BERC)
- Fare zone: 52 (mobilis)

History
- Opened: 24 November 1889
- Electrified: 7 December 1935

Services
Preceding station	LEB	Following station
Terminus	R20	Fey towards Lausanne-Flon
Location

Bercher railway station (French: Gare de Bercher) is a railway station in the municipality of Bercher, in the Swiss canton of Vaud. It is the northern terminus of the 1,000 mm (3 ft 3 3/8 in) Lausanne–Bercher line of the Chemin de fer Lausanne-Échallens-Bercher (LEB). The station has two terminal tracks, each with a side platform, together with a passing loop and a siding.

Bercher station opened to service on 24 November 1889, as the outer terminus of the Compagnie du Central Vaudois line from Échallens station. Although the Central Vaudois was nominally an independent company, its line was operated by the Lausanne-Échallens line, with which it connected at Échallens. The two lines merged as the LEB in 1913, and were electrified in 1935.

The main reason for building the line to Bercher was the presence in the town of a condensed milk plant owned by Nestlé. This was linked to the station by an aerial cableway. However, in 1921, the plant closed, resulting in a sharp decline in freight traffic on the LEB railway.

== Services ==
As of the December 2023 timetable change, the following services stop at Bercher:

- Regio: half-hourly service to Lausanne-Flon.

== Gallery ==
The station and village from the air in 1963

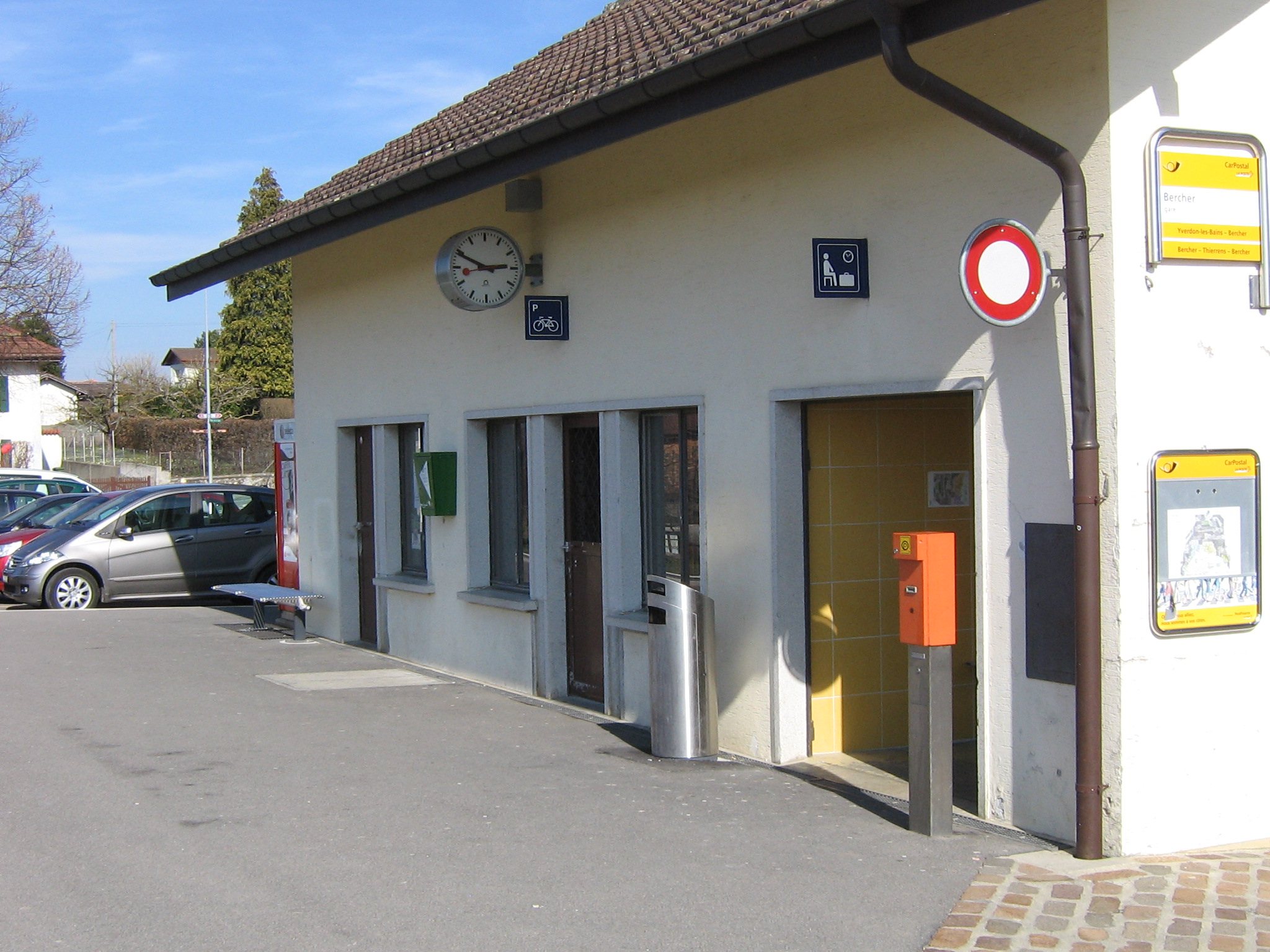
The track side of the station building

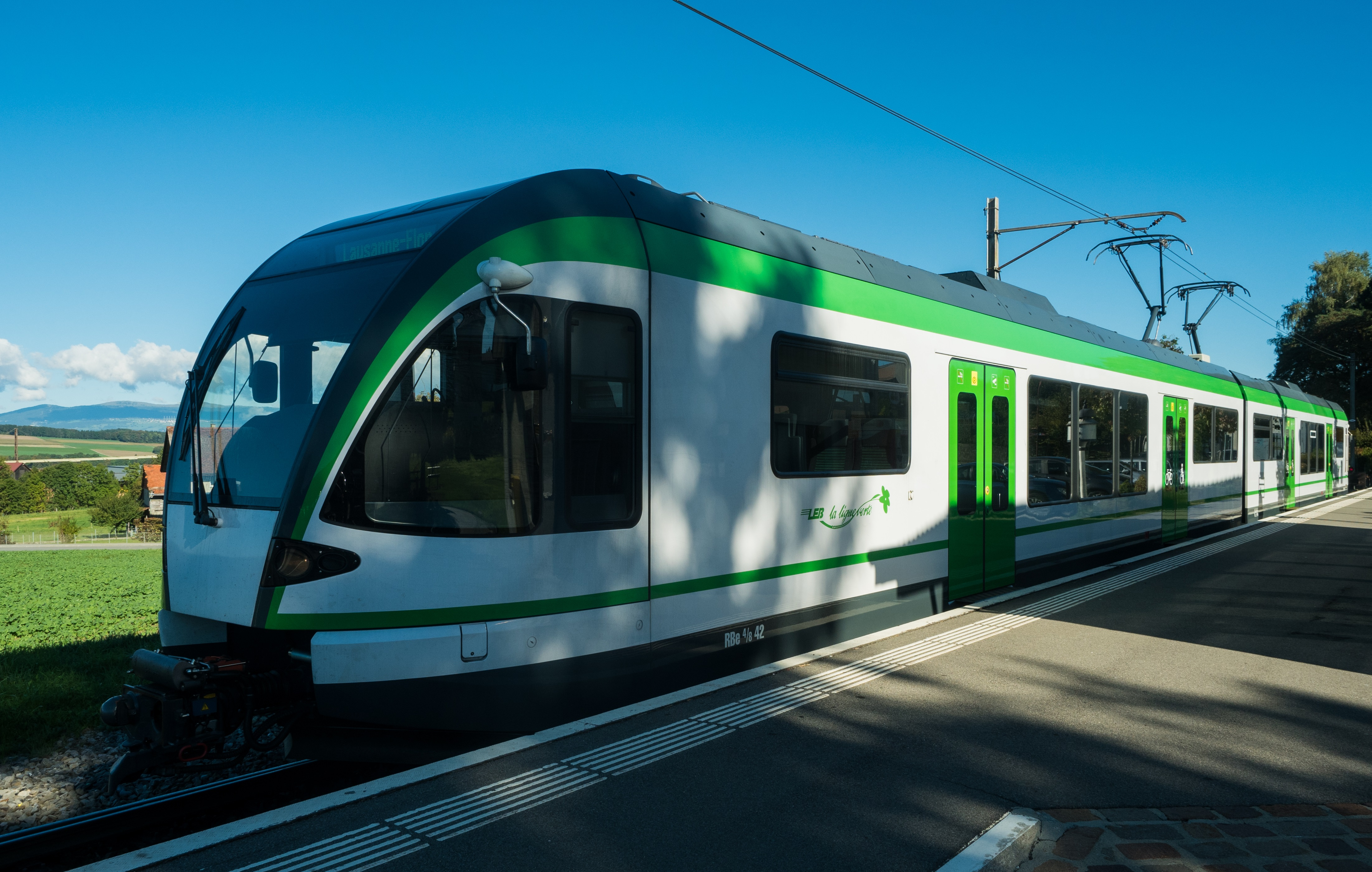
A train in the station platform
