= Le Lussex railway station =

Railway station in Switzerland

Le Lussex
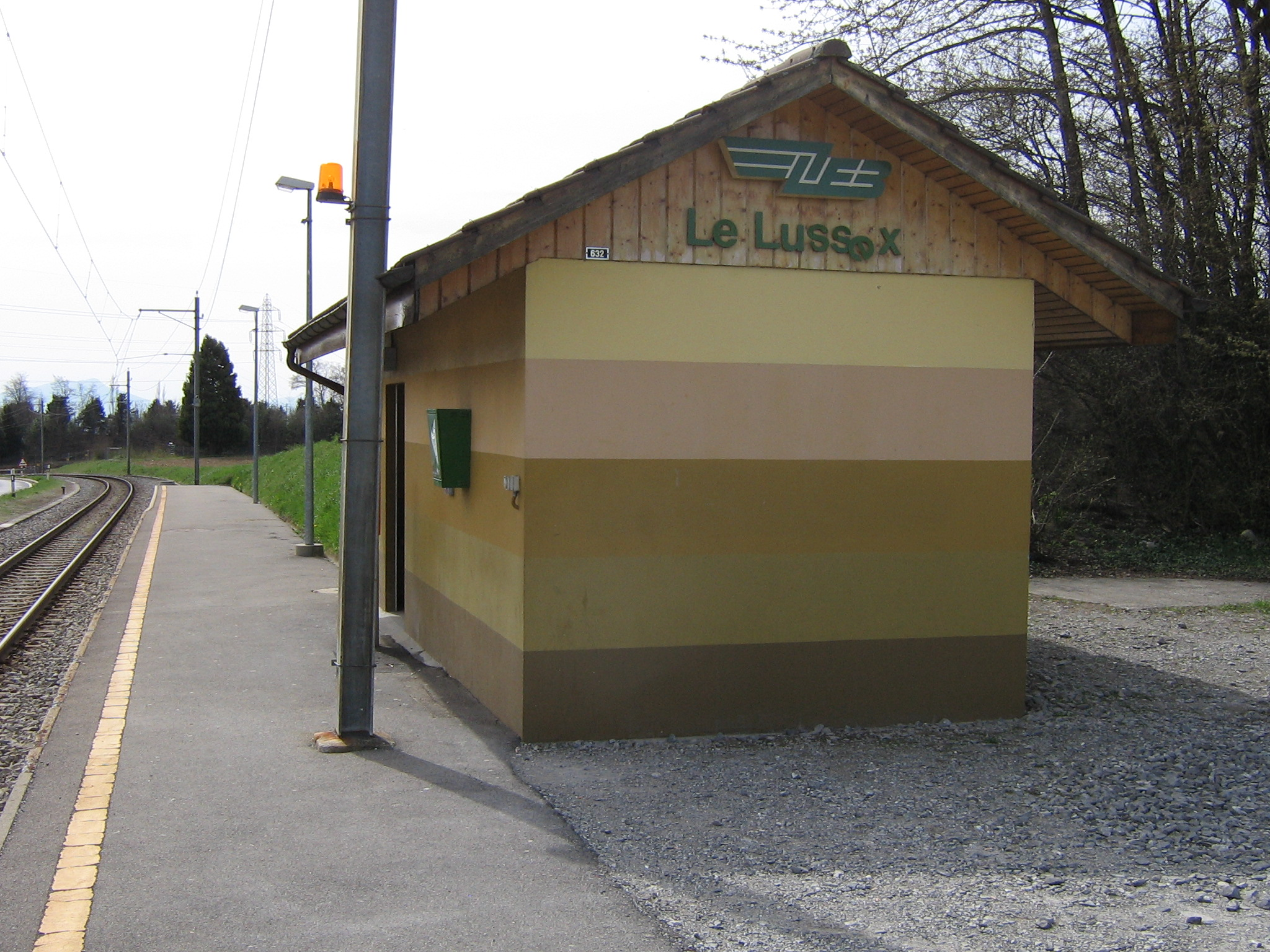
- The station in 2011

General information
- Location: Jouxtens-Mézery, Vaud; Switzerland
- Coordinates: 46°33′25″N 6°36′03″E
- Elevation: 592 m (1,942 ft)
- Owner: Chemin de fer Lausanne-Échallens-Bercher
- Line: Lausanne–Bercher line
- Distance: 5.1 km (3.2 mi) from Lausanne-Flon
- Platforms: 1 side platform
- Tracks: 1
- Train operators: Chemin de fer Lausanne-Échallens-Bercher

Other information
- Fare zone: 12 and 16 (mobilis)

History
- Opened: 1964
- Closed: 13 December 2020
Location

Le Lussex railway station (French: Halte de Le Lussex) was a railway station in the municipality of Jouxtens-Mézery, in the Swiss canton of Vaud. It was located on the 1,000 mm (3 ft 3 3/8 in) Lausanne–Bercher line of the Chemin de fer Lausanne-Échallens-Bercher (LEB).

The stop opened in 1964, and was eliminated with the 13 December 2020 timetable change in order to improve timekeeping over the line. The closure was unpopular with the local community, as the next stop north at Romanel-sur-Lausanne is in a different fare zone and has higher ticket prices for the commute to Lausanne.

As of October 2025, work is underway to construct a railway bridge and a grade-separated road that will eliminate the level crossing to the north of the Lussex station site. This work has resulted in the demolition of the closed station, but the railway company has stated that the work is designed to be compatible with its reconstruction.
