= Boxer Beer =

Brewery in Vaud, Switzerland

Bière du Boxer SA
- Location: Yverdon-les-Bains, Vaud, Switzerland
- Annual production volume: 3,000,000 L (660,000 imp gal; 790,000 US gal)
- Website: www.doppelleuboxer.ch/de

The Bière du Boxer SA is the successor company of the Brasserie du Boxer S.A, which was founded in 1960 in Lausanne. The brewery moved to its new location in Yverdon-les-Bains at the end of March 2012.

In 2018, Bière du Boxer SA was acquired by Doppelleu AG, resulting in the formation of Doppelleu Boxer AG, which was renamed Chopfab Boxer AG in 2023. The majority of production was relocated to Winterthur, while a bottling plant and a small brewing facility remained at the Yverdon-les-Bains site.

== History ==
The brewery was founded in 1960 in Lausanne under the name Brasserie du Boxer S.A. and began production in 1962 in Romanel-sur-Lausanne. In 1982, it was sold to a French owner, and in 1994 to an Indian group. After bankruptcy in 1997, new investors founded the successor company Bière du Boxer SA. With an annual production of about 30,000 hectoliters, it is the largest independent brewery in the French-speaking part of Switzerland. The operation was moved at the end of March 2012 to the site of the former mineral water source Arkina in Yverdon-les-Bains.

The Boxer dog named Aramis of the founder and first director of the brewery, Albert Heusser, was the namesake, and a picture still appears on the label.

== Position regarding the Swiss beer cartel ==
The owner of the newly established brewery was a declared opponent of the beer cartel. He deliberately opted for a different bottle size of 50 cl compared to the cartel's standard of 60 cl (later 58 cl) and used other containers. He also did not adhere to the specifications for the characteristics of the beer set by the then Swiss Brewer's Association (now Swiss Brewery Association). The products were freely marketed throughout Switzerland, providing retailers and restaurants with an alternative to the rigid allocation rules of the cartel breweries. Despite benefiting from the circumstances of free distribution channels, Boxer was still indirectly affected by the cartel. The cartel's customer protection agreement allowed publicans to carry a newcomer's beer, but threatened retailers with termination of their customer relationships if they supplemented their offerings in that direction. As a result, the West Swiss brewery was able to sell about 90% of its production in the German-speaking part of Switzerland.

Given the circumstances, it is remarkable that in 1974 the Zurich Brewery Hürlimann considered acquiring Boxer to strengthen its position in Romandy. However, they did not use the purchase option due to concerns about acquiring an outsider.

The changes following the collapse of the cartel in the early 1990s and the earlier market opening to foreign beers also affected Boxer's financial success. The shares of the sales areas changed significantly in the following years: In 2010, about 60% of the output remained in the French-speaking part of Switzerland, while the rest went to the German-speaking part.

== Product range ==
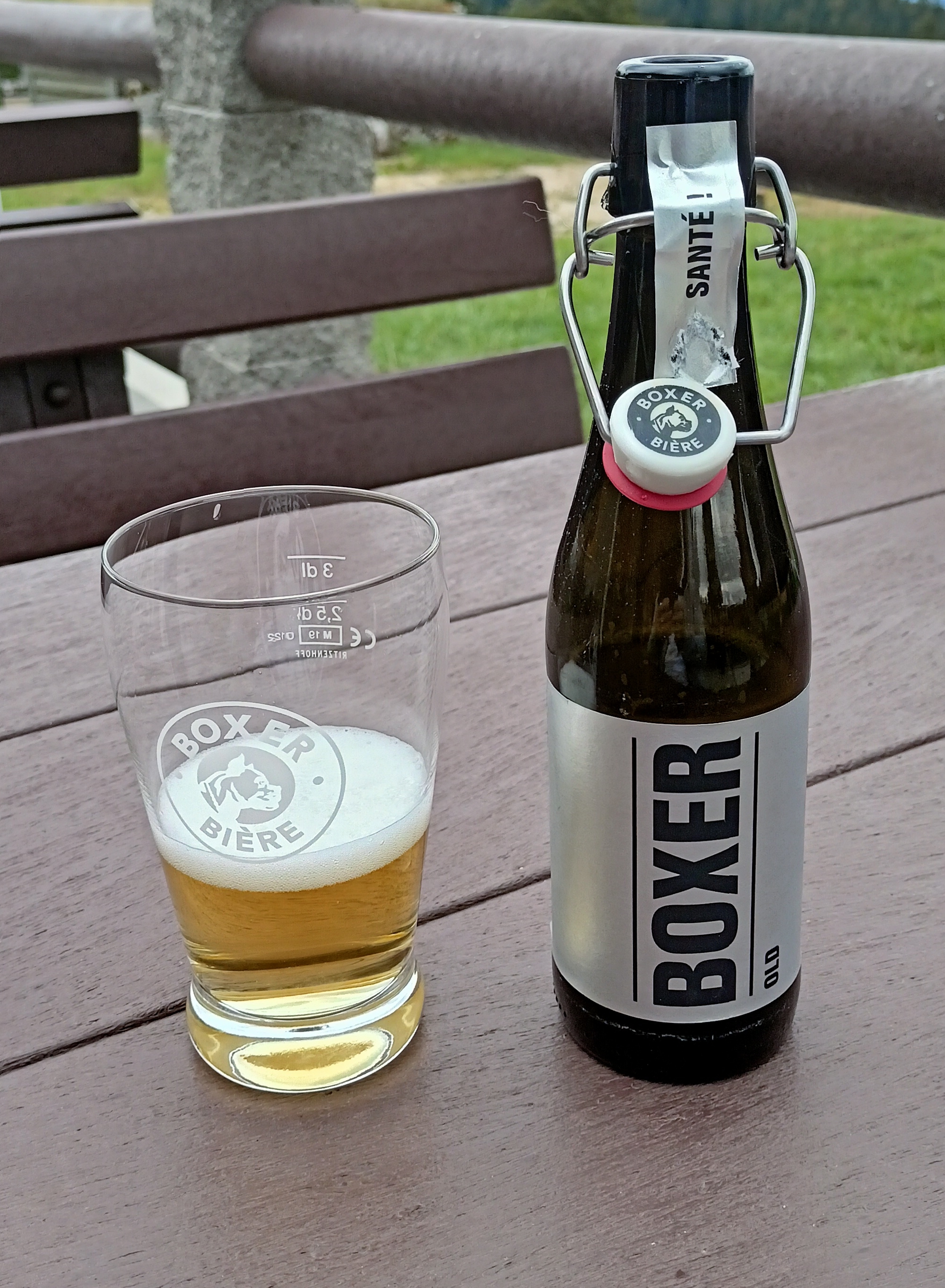
Bottle of Boxer

(Source:)

- Boxer Old, lager beer with 5.0% alcohol by volume
- Boxer Blanche, wheat beer in the Belgian style with 5.0% alcohol by volume
- Boxer Brunette, dark specialty beer with 5.2% alcohol by volume
- Boxer Pale Ale, amber-colored pale ale with 5.3% alcohol by volume
- Boxer Blonde, unfiltered lager beer with 4.8% alcohol by volume

== Literature ==
- Matthias Wiesmann: Beer and Us, History of Breweries and Beer Consumption in Switzerland. Verlag hier + jetzt, Baden 2011, ISBN 978-3-03919-193-2.
