= Jouxtens-Mézery railway station =

Railway station in Jouxtens-Mézery, Switzerland

Jouxtens-Mézery
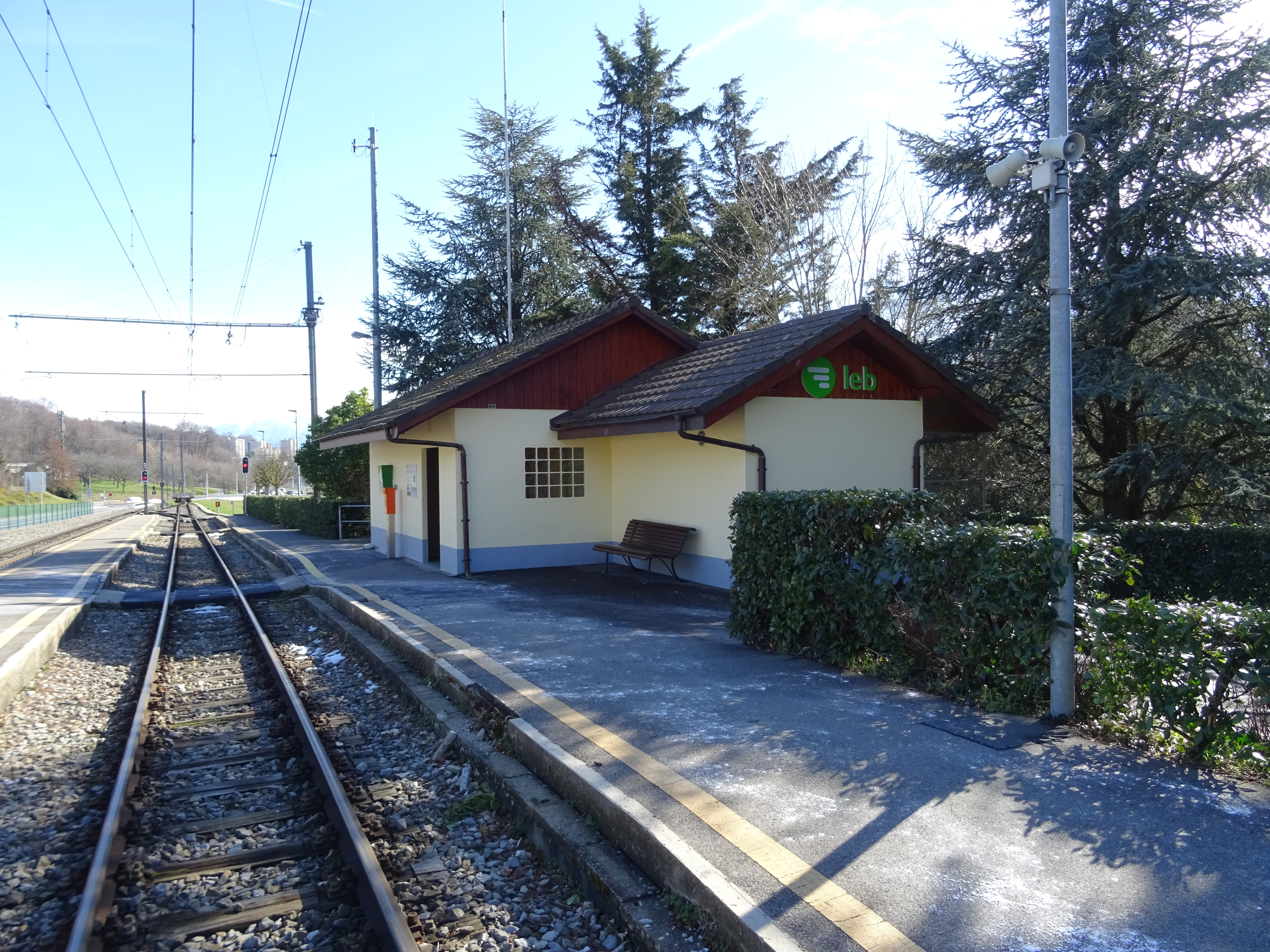
- The station in 2020

General information
- Location: Jouxtens-Mézery, Vaud; Switzerland
- Coordinates: 46°32′54″N 6°36′06″E
- Elevation: 555 m (1,821 ft)
- Owner: Chemin de fer Lausanne-Échallens-Bercher
- Line: Lausanne–Bercher line
- Distance: 3.6 km (2.2 mi) from Lausanne-Flon
- Platforms: 1 island platform; 1 side platform
- Tracks: 2
- Train operators: Chemin de fer Lausanne-Échallens-Bercher

Construction
- Accessible: No

Other information
- Station code: 8501165 (JOUM)
- Fare zone: 12 (mobilis)

Services
Preceding station	LEB	Following station
Romanel-sur-Lausanne towards Echallens or Bercher	R20	Cery-Fleur-de-Lys towards Lausanne-Flon
Location

Jouxtens-Mézery railway station (French: Gare de Jouxtens-Mézery), formerly known as Jouxtens-Cery, is a railway station in the municipality of Jouxtens-Mézery, in the Swiss canton of Vaud. It is located on the 1,000 mm (3 ft 3 3/8 in) Lausanne–Bercher line of the Chemin de fer Lausanne-Échallens-Bercher (LEB).

Jouxtens-Cery station opened to service in 1887, as a simple stop. It was renamed Jouxtens-Mézery around the year 1900. The line was electrified in 1935 and, two years later, a passing loop, centre platform and siding were added.

Work started in 2024 to renovate the station and replace the old platform arrangement with two raised side platforms compliant with accessibility standards. After about two and a half years of work on the line between Jouxtens-Mézery and Romanel-sur-Lausanne, the LEB held the official inauguration on 1 May 2026.

== Services ==
As of the December 2023 timetable change, the following services stop at Jouxtens-Mézery:

- Regio: service every fifteen minutes between Lausanne-Flon and Echallens, with every other train continuing from Echallens to Bercher.

== Gallery ==
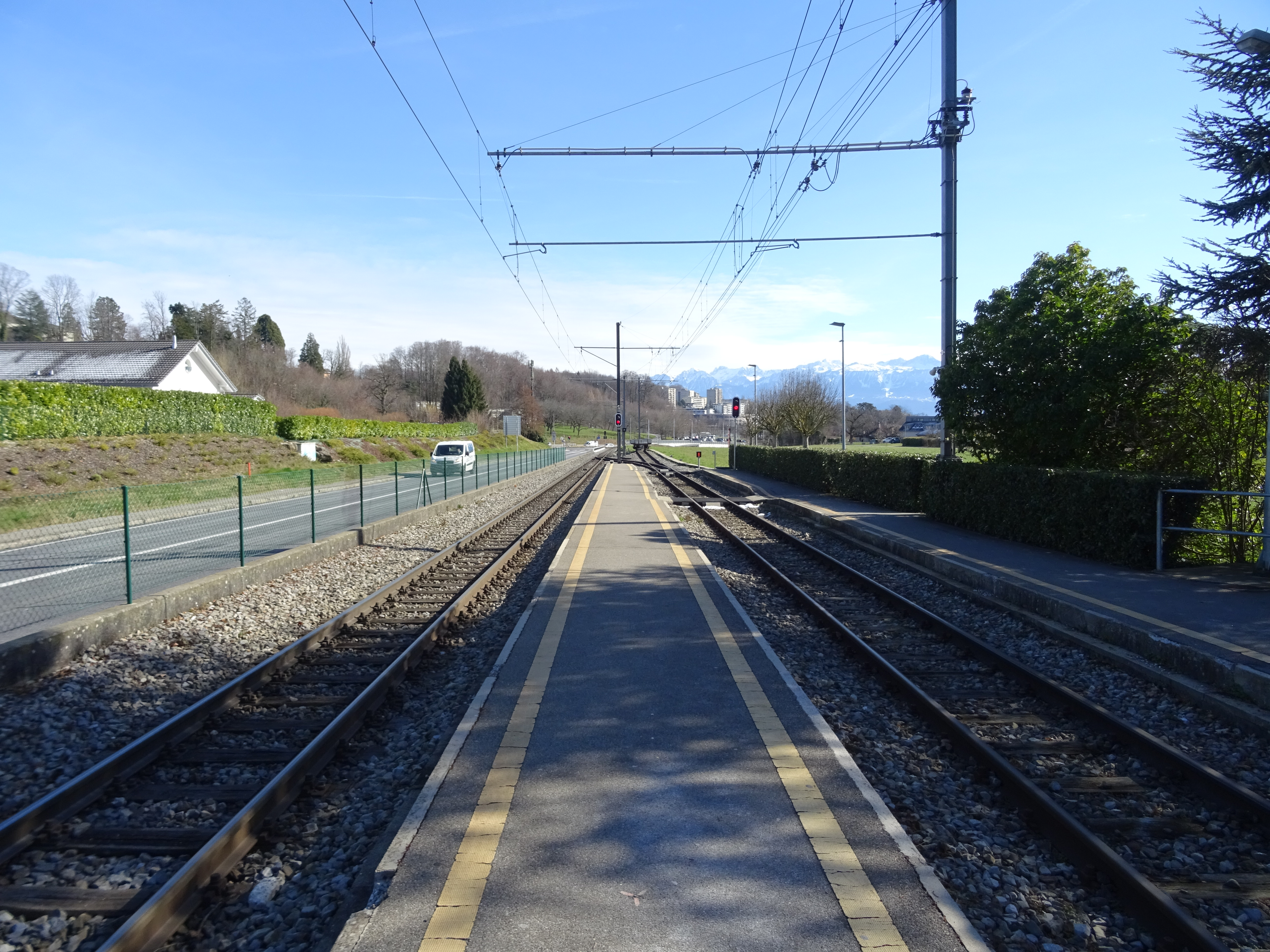
Center platform looking towards Lausanne

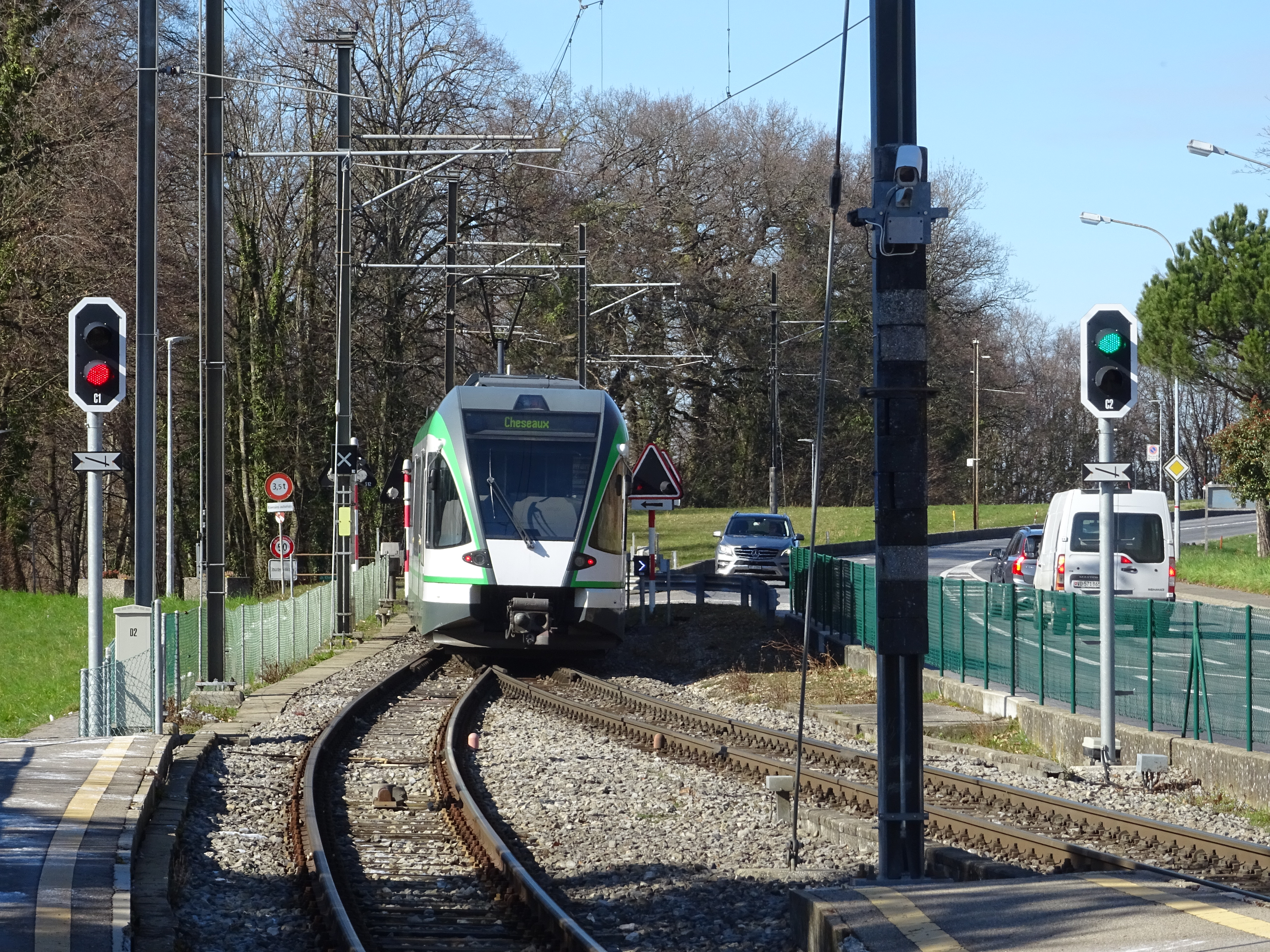
Train leaving the station towards Échallens

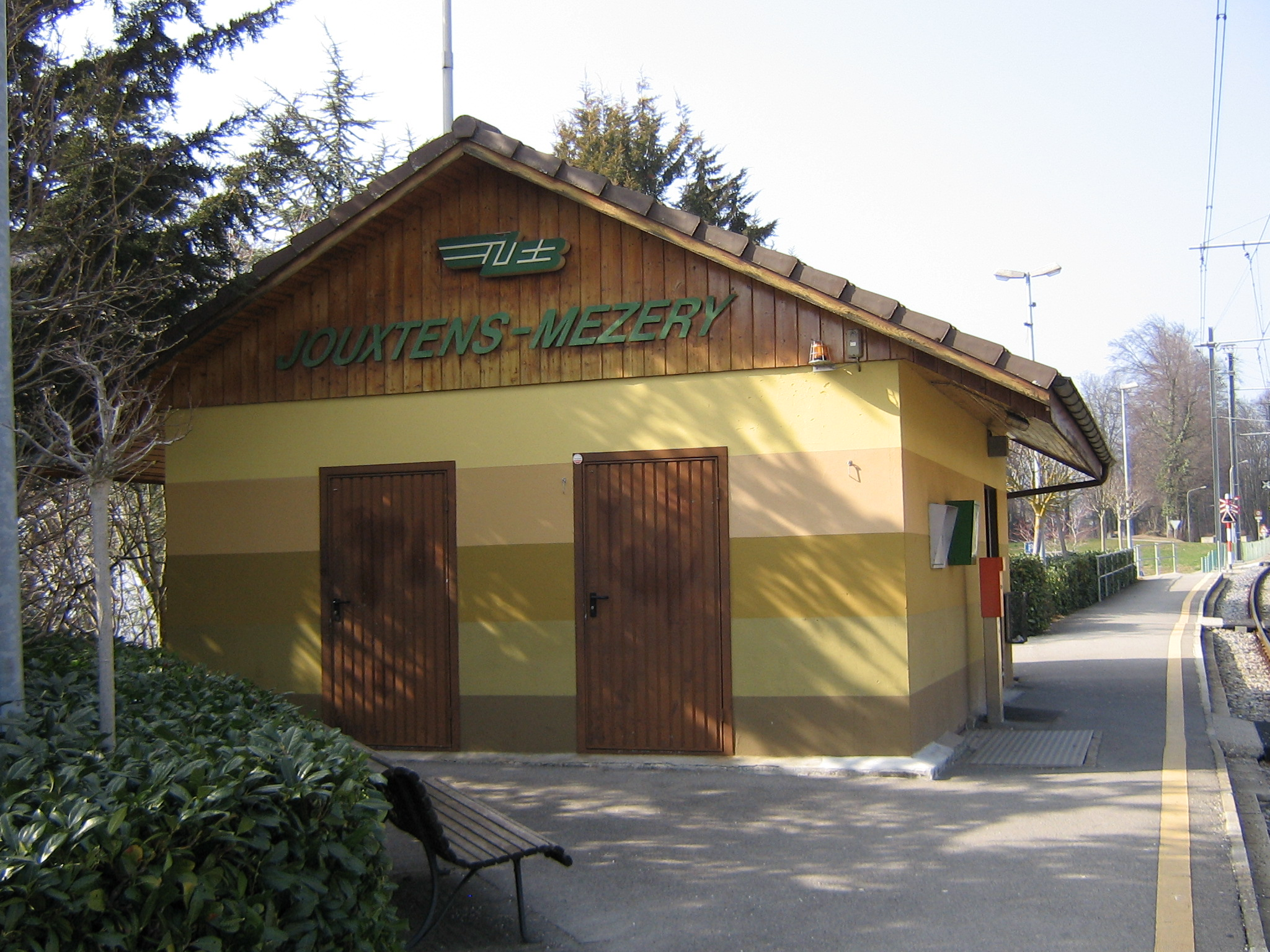
The station building
