= Raymond Burki =

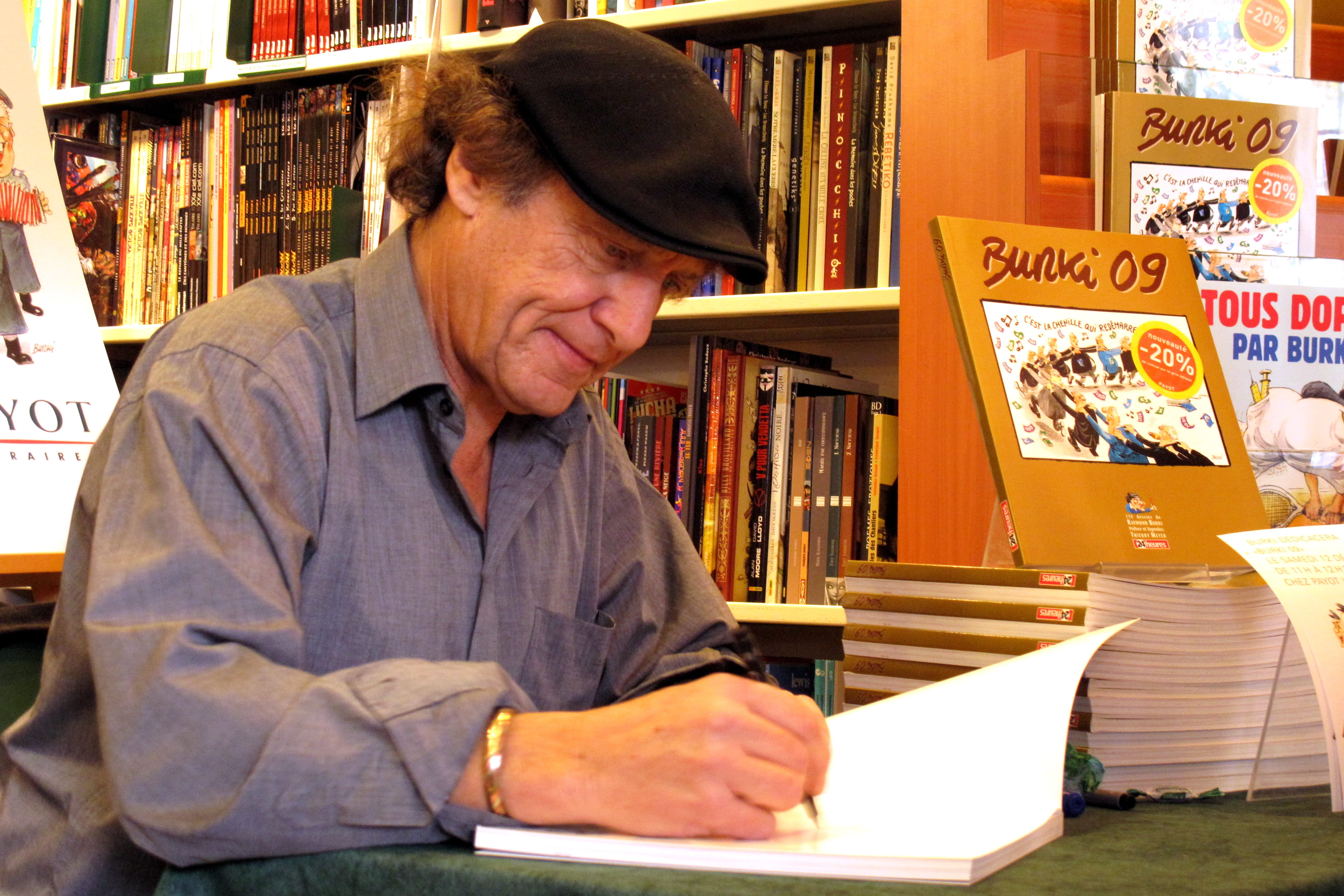
- Raymond Burki in 2009
- Born: 2 September 1949; Épalinges, Vaud, Switzerland
- Died: 29 December 2016 (aged 67)
- Occupation: Cartoonist

Raymond Burki (2 September 1949 – 29 December 2016) was a Swiss cartoonist. He did over 8,000 drawings over the course of his career, and spent four decades as a cartoonist for 24 heures.

== Early life ==
Raymond Burki was born on 2 September 1949 in Épalinges, Vaud, Switzerland. His father was a cook.

Burki was trained in photo manipulation in a rotogravure firm in Lausanne. He was an avid reader of Charlie Hebdo in his youth.

== Career ==
Burki started his career in Paris for a year, until he returned to Switzerland to work in rotogravure from 1971 to 1979.

Burki published his first cartoon in La Tribune de Lausanne in 1976. He subsequently worked as a cartoonist for 24 heures over four decades. He also published cartoons in Bilan and Die Sonntagszeitung. He was best known for his ironic cartoons of politicians, most of which contained no words, only drawings. He did over 8,000 drawings over the course of his career, and he retired in 2014. Many of his cartoons were published as books.

Burki won the Prix du meilleur dessin étranger in Epinal in 1988, the Prix du public in Morges 1989, the Prix Jean Dumur in 1990, the Prix du meilleur livre d'humour Juvignac in 1998, and the Prix de la Fondation vaudoise pour la promotion et la création artistiques in 2003.

== Personal life, death and legacy ==
Burki resided in his hometown of Épalinges. He enjoyed angling for mussels. He was left-wing.

Burki died of cancer on 29 December 2016. His funeral will be held at the Abbey of Montheron in Montheron near Lausanne.

Upon his death, Jacqueline de Quattro, a member of the Council of State of Vaud, "He was a very touching person, and I admired his free spirit. Even though his drawings could be vitriolic, they were also respectful and tender towards people. I was honored to be cartooned by him."

== Selected works ==
- Burki, Raymond (1983). Burki sonne le glas?. Lausanne: Editions du Sauvage. OCLC 83024349.
- Burki, Raymond; Dunand, Fabien (1988). L'effet Burki : 128 dessins. Lausanne. ISBN 9782826510598. OCLC 715136593.
- Burki, Raymond; Dunan, Fabien (1992). Couleur Burki : 150 dessins de Raymond Burki. Lausanne: Marketing 24 Heures. ISBN 9782826510956. OCLC 715194734.
- Burki, Raymond; Poget, Jacques (1999). Signé Burki : 150 dessins. Lausanne: Marketing 24 Heures. ISBN 9782826511304. OCLC 79667003.
- Burki, Raymond (2001). Dessinez, c'est facile!. Lausanne: Marketing 24 Heures. ISBN 9782826511373. OCLC 82767771.
- Burki, Raymond; Poget, Jacques (2001). Burki 01 : 152 dessins de Raymond Burki. Lausanne: Marketing 24 Heures. ISBN 9782826511410. OCLC 718098697.
- Burki, Raymond; Poget, Jacques (2002). Burki 02 : 151 dessins de Raymond Burki. Lausanne: Marketing 24 Heures. OCLC 716842923.
- Burki, Raymond; François, Silvant (2003). Sketches : une sélection des meilleurs sketches. Lausanne: Marketing 24 Heures. ISBN 9782826511472. OCLC 85315698.
- Burki, Raymond; Poget, Jacques (2003). Burki 03 : 152 dessins de Raymond Burki. Lausanne: Marketing 24 Heures. ISBN 9782826511489. OCLC 716613820.
- Burki, Raymond; Poget, Jacques (2004). Burki 04 : 152 dessins de Raymond Burki. Lausanne: Marketing 24 Heures. ISBN 9782826511656. OCLC 716915099.
- Burki, Raymond; Poget, Jacques (2005). Burki 05 : 152 dessins de Raymond Burki. Lausanne: Marketing 24 Heures. ISBN 9782826511694. OCLC 717877324.
- Burki, Raymond; Poget, Jacques (2006). Burki 06 : 162 dessins de Raymond Burki. Lausanne: Marketing 24 Heures. ISBN 9782826511816. OCLC 717244374.
- Burki, Raymond; Poget, Jacques (2007). Burki 07 : 182 dessins. Lausanne: Marketing 24 Heures. ISBN 9782826511847. OCLC 428126241.
- Burki, Raymond; Meyer, Thierry (2008). Burki 08 : 165 dessins. Lausanne: Marketing 24 Heures. ISBN 9782826511892. OCLC 428178949.
- Burki, Raymond; Meyer, Thierry (2009). Burki 09 : 170 dessins de Raymond Burki. Lausanne: Marketing 24 Heures. ISBN 9782826511908. OCLC 717465543.
- Burki, Raymond (2009). Tous dopés par Burki : le dopage vu par Raymond Burki. Nyon: Glénat. ISBN 9782723473644. OCLC 717390311.
- Burki, Raymond; Meyer, Thierry (2010). Burki 10 : 166 dessins. Lausanne: Marketing 24 Heures. ISBN 9782826511915. OCLC 718686325.
