= Le Mont-sur-Lausanne =

- Municipality
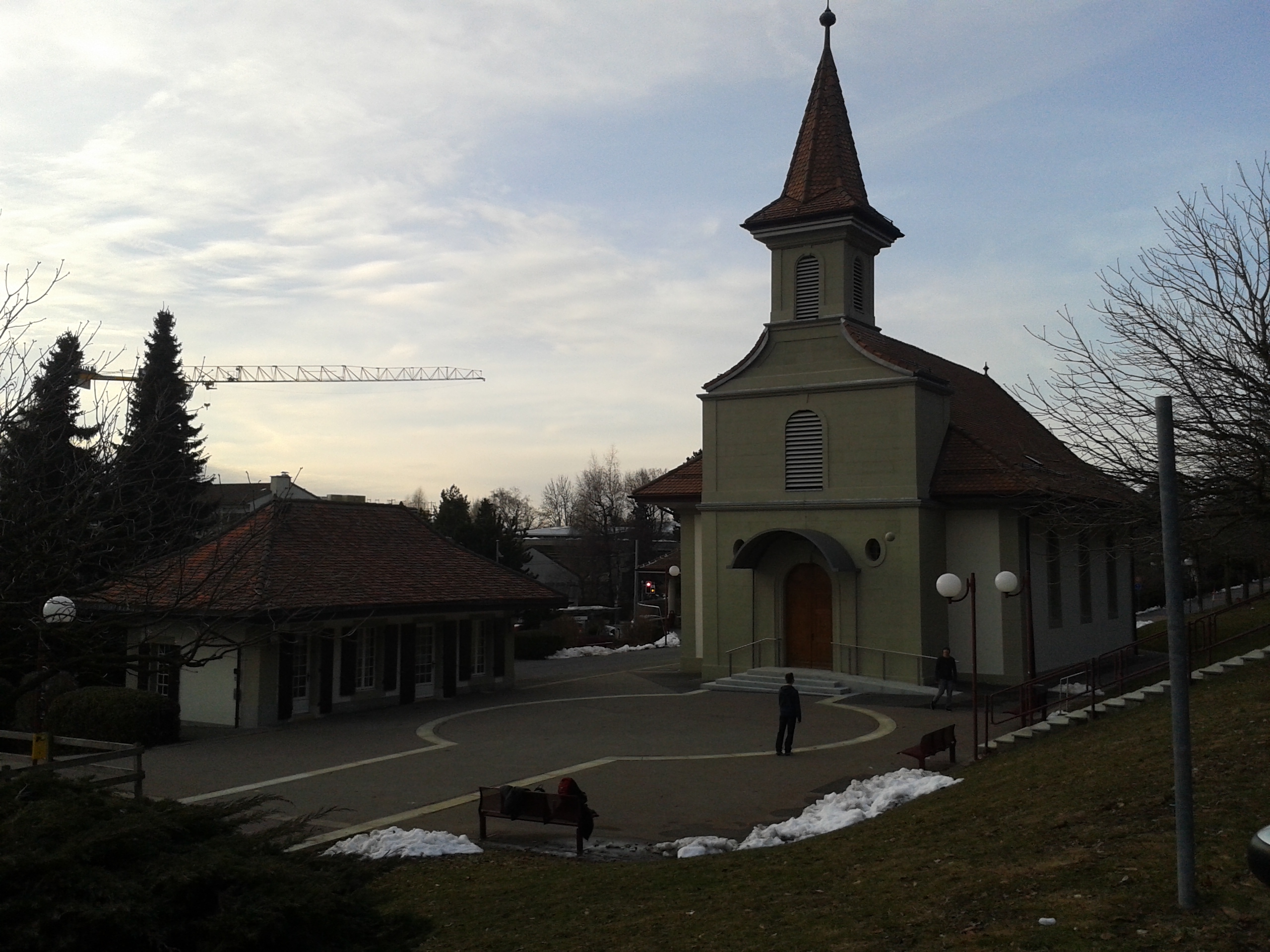

- Flag Coat of arms
- Location of Le Mont-sur-Lausanne
- Location within Switzerland Location within Canton of Vaud
- Coordinates: 46°33′N 06°38′E
- Country: Switzerland
- Canton: Vaud
- District: Lausanne

Government
  - Mayor: Syndic; Jean-Pierre Sueur

Area
  - Total: 9.82 km^{2} (3.79 sq mi)
- Elevation: 702 m (2,303 ft)

Population (2007)
  - Total: 5,343
  - Density: 544/km^{2} (1,410/sq mi)
- Time zone: UTC+01:00 (CET)
  - Summer (DST): UTC+02:00 (CEST)
- Postal code: 1052
- SFOS number: 5587
- ISO 3166 code: CH-VD
- Surrounded by: Cugy, Epalinges, Lausanne, Romanel-sur-Lausanne
- Twin towns: Samedan (Switzerland)
- Website: www.lemontsurlausanne.ch

Le Mont-sur-Lausanne (French pronunciation: [lə mɔ̃ syʁ lɔzan]; lit. 'The Mount-on-Lausanne'; Arpitan: Lo Mont) is a municipality in the district of Lausanne in the canton of Vaud in Switzerland. It is a suburb of the cantonal capital Lausanne, of which it is just north.

== History ==
Le Mont-sur-Lausanne is first mentioned in 1237 as Monte super Lausannam.

== Geography ==
Aerial view (1964)

Le Mont-sur-Lausanne has an area, as of 2009, of 9.82–9.75 square kilometers (3.79–3.76 mi^{2}) (depending on calculation method). Of this area, 5.01 km^{2} (1.93 mi^{2}) or 51.0% is used for agricultural purposes, while 1.79 km^{2} (0.69 mi^{2}) or 18.2% is forested. Of the rest of the land, 2.95 km^{2} (1.14 mi^{2}) or 30.0% is settled (buildings or roads).

Of the built up area, industrial buildings made up 3.8% of the total area while housing and buildings made up 17.1% and transportation infrastructure made up 7.3%. while parks, green belts and sports fields made up 1.4%. Out of the forested land, 16.5% of the total land area is heavily forested and 1.7% is covered with orchards or small clusters of trees. Of the agricultural land, 42.6% is used for growing crops and 6.4% is pastures, while 2.0% is used for orchards or vine crops.

The municipality was part of the Lausanne District until it was dissolved on 31 August 2006, and Le Mont-sur-Lausanne became part of the new district of Lausanne.

The municipality is located in the northern portion of the agglomeration of Lausanne and on the edge of the Jorat woods. It consists of the village sections of Le Petit-Mont, Le Grand-Mont and Les Planches.

== Coat of arms ==
The blazon of the municipal coat of arms is Gules, three Hills Argent, growing from the middle one a Horse Chestnut Tree; chief of the same.

== Demographics ==
Le Mont-sur-Lausanne has a population (as of December 2020) of 9,144. As of 2008, 18.1% of the population are resident foreign nationals. Over the last 10 years (1999–2009 ) the population has changed at a rate of 7.1%. It has changed at a rate of 5.6% due to migration and at a rate of 1.4% due to births and deaths.

Most of the population (as of 2000) speaks French (4,539 or 87.6%), with German being second most common (286 or 5.5%) and Italian being third (94 or 1.8%). There are 2 people who speak Romansh.

Of the population in the municipality 884 or about 17.1% were born in Le Mont-sur-Lausanne and lived there in 2000. There were 2,194 or 42.3% who were born in the same canton, while 965 or 18.6% were born somewhere else in Switzerland, and 1,036 or 20.0% were born outside of Switzerland.

In 2008 there were 34 live births to Swiss citizens and 6 births to non-Swiss citizens, and in same time span there were 45 deaths of Swiss citizens and 2 non-Swiss citizen deaths. Ignoring immigration and emigration, the population of Swiss citizens decreased by 11 while the foreign population increased by 4. There were 7 Swiss men and 7 Swiss women who emigrated from Switzerland. At the same time, there were 15 non-Swiss men and 25 non-Swiss women who immigrated from another country to Switzerland. The total Swiss population change in 2008 (from all sources, including moves across municipal borders) was a decrease of 9 and the non-Swiss population increased by 13 people. This represents a population growth rate of 0.1%.

The age distribution, as of 2009, in Le Mont-sur-Lausanne is; 576 children or 10.6% of the population are between 0 and 9 years old and 740 teenagers or 13.6% are between 10 and 19. Of the adult population, 580 people or 10.6% of the population are between 20 and 29 years old. 628 people or 11.5% are between 30 and 39, 917 people or 16.8% are between 40 and 49, and 730 people or 13.4% are between 50 and 59. The senior population distribution is 656 people or 12.0% of the population are between 60 and 69 years old, 381 people or 7.0% are between 70 and 79, there are 217 people or 4.0% who are between 80 and 89, and there are 31 people or 0.6% who are 90 and older.

As of 2000, there were 2,059 people who were single and never married in the municipality. There were 2,595 married individuals, 249 widows or widowers and 279 individuals who are divorced.

As of 2000, there were 1,963 private households in the municipality, and an average of 2.5 persons per household. There were 487 households that consist of only one person and 165 households with five or more people. Out of a total of 2,008 households that answered this question, 24.3% were households made up of just one person and there were 15 adults who lived with their parents. Of the rest of the households, there are 561 married couples without children, 775 married couples with children There were 99 single parents with a child or children. There were 26 households that were made up of unrelated people and 45 households that were made up of some sort of institution or another collective housing.

In 2000 there were 851 single family homes (or 67.5% of the total) out of a total of 1,261 inhabited buildings. There were 218 multi-family buildings (17.3%), along with 123 multi-purpose buildings that were mostly used for housing (9.8%) and 69 other use buildings (commercial or industrial) that also had some housing (5.5%). Of the single family homes 45 were built before 1919, while 100 were built between 1990 and 2000. The greatest number of single family homes (238) were built between 1971 and 1980. The most multi-family homes (55) were built between 1961 and 1970 and the next most (43) were built between 1981 and 1990. There were 4 multi-family houses built between 1996 and 2000.

In 2000 there were 2,004 apartments in the municipality. The most common apartment size was 4 rooms of which there were 466. There were 79 single room apartments and 881 apartments with five or more rooms. Of these apartments, a total of 1,880 apartments (93.8% of the total) were permanently occupied, while 97 apartments (4.8%) were seasonally occupied and 27 apartments (1.3%) were empty. As of 2009, the construction rate of new housing units was 0.4 new units per 1000 residents. The vacancy rate for the municipality, in 2010, was 0.05%.

The historical population is given in the following chart:

== Politics ==
In the 2007 federal election the most popular party was the SVP which received 21.54% of the vote. The next three most popular parties were the FDP (17.6%), the SP (17.17%) and the Green Party (12.72%). In the federal election, a total of 1,678 votes were cast, and the voter turnout was 49.6%.

== Economy ==
As of 2010, Le Mont-sur-Lausanne had an unemployment rate of 3.6%. As of 2008, there were 62 people employed in the primary economic sector and about 22 businesses involved in this sector. 1,103 people were employed in the secondary sector and there were 94 businesses in this sector. 4,670 people were employed in the tertiary sector, with 319 businesses in this sector. There were 2,544 residents of the municipality who were employed in some capacity, of which females made up 41.4% of the workforce.

In 2008 the total number of full-time equivalent jobs was 4,892. The number of jobs in the primary sector was 41, all of which were in agriculture. The number of jobs in the secondary sector was 1,037 of which 613 or (59.1%) were in manufacturing and 404 (39.0%) were in construction. The number of jobs in the tertiary sector was 3,814. In the tertiary sector; 972 or 25.5% were in wholesale or retail sales or the repair of motor vehicles, 139 or 3.6% were in the movement and storage of goods, 65 or 1.7% were in a hotel or restaurant, 212 or 5.6% were in the information industry, 47 or 1.2% were the insurance or financial industry, 415 or 10.9% were technical professionals or scientists, 174 or 4.6% were in education and 549 or 14.4% were in health care.

In 2000, there were 4,069 workers who commuted into the municipality and 1,924 workers who commuted away. The municipality is a net importer of workers, with about 2.1 workers entering the municipality for every one leaving. About 1.8% of the workforce coming into Le Mont-sur-Lausanne are coming from outside Switzerland. Of the working population, 14.2% used public transportation to get to work, and 68.4% used a private car.

== Religion ==
From the 2000 census, 1,678 or 32.4% were Roman Catholic, while 2,304 or 44.5% belonged to the Swiss Reformed Church. Of the rest of the population, there were 60 members of an Orthodox church (or about 1.16% of the population), there were 4 individuals (or about 0.08% of the population) who belonged to the Christian Catholic Church, and there were 267 individuals (or about 5.15% of the population) who belonged to another Christian church. There were 16 individuals (or about 0.31% of the population) who were Jewish, and 60 (or about 1.16% of the population) who were Islamic. There were 29 individuals who were Buddhist, 3 individuals who were Hindu and 9 individuals who belonged to another church. 673 (or about 12.99% of the population) belonged to no church, are agnostic or atheist, and 204 individuals (or about 3.94% of the population) did not answer the question.

== Education ==
In Le Mont-sur-Lausanne about 1,920 or (37.1%) of the population have completed non-mandatory upper secondary education, and 1,085 or (20.9%) have completed additional higher education (either university or a Fachhochschule). Of the 1,085 who completed tertiary schooling, 56.3% were Swiss men, 28.4% were Swiss women, 9.8% were non-Swiss men and 5.5% were non-Swiss women.

In the 2009/2010 school year there were a total of 666 students in the Le Mont-sur-Lausanne school district. In the Vaud cantonal school system, two years of non-obligatory pre-school are provided by the political districts. During the school year, the political district provided pre-school care for a total of 2,648 children of which 1,947 children (73.5%) received subsidized pre-school care. The canton's primary school program requires students to attend for four years. There were 315 students in the municipal primary school program. The obligatory lower secondary school program lasts for six years and there were 337 students in those schools. There were also 14 students who were home schooled or attended another non-traditional school.

As of 2000, there were 200 students in Le Mont-sur-Lausanne who came from another municipality, while 483 residents attended schools outside the municipality.

International School of Lausanne is in the city.

== Notable people ==
- Emma Pieczynska-Reichenbach (1854–1927)
- Mikołaj Bańka, photographer (2016-2020)
