= Jouxtens-Mézery =

- Municipality
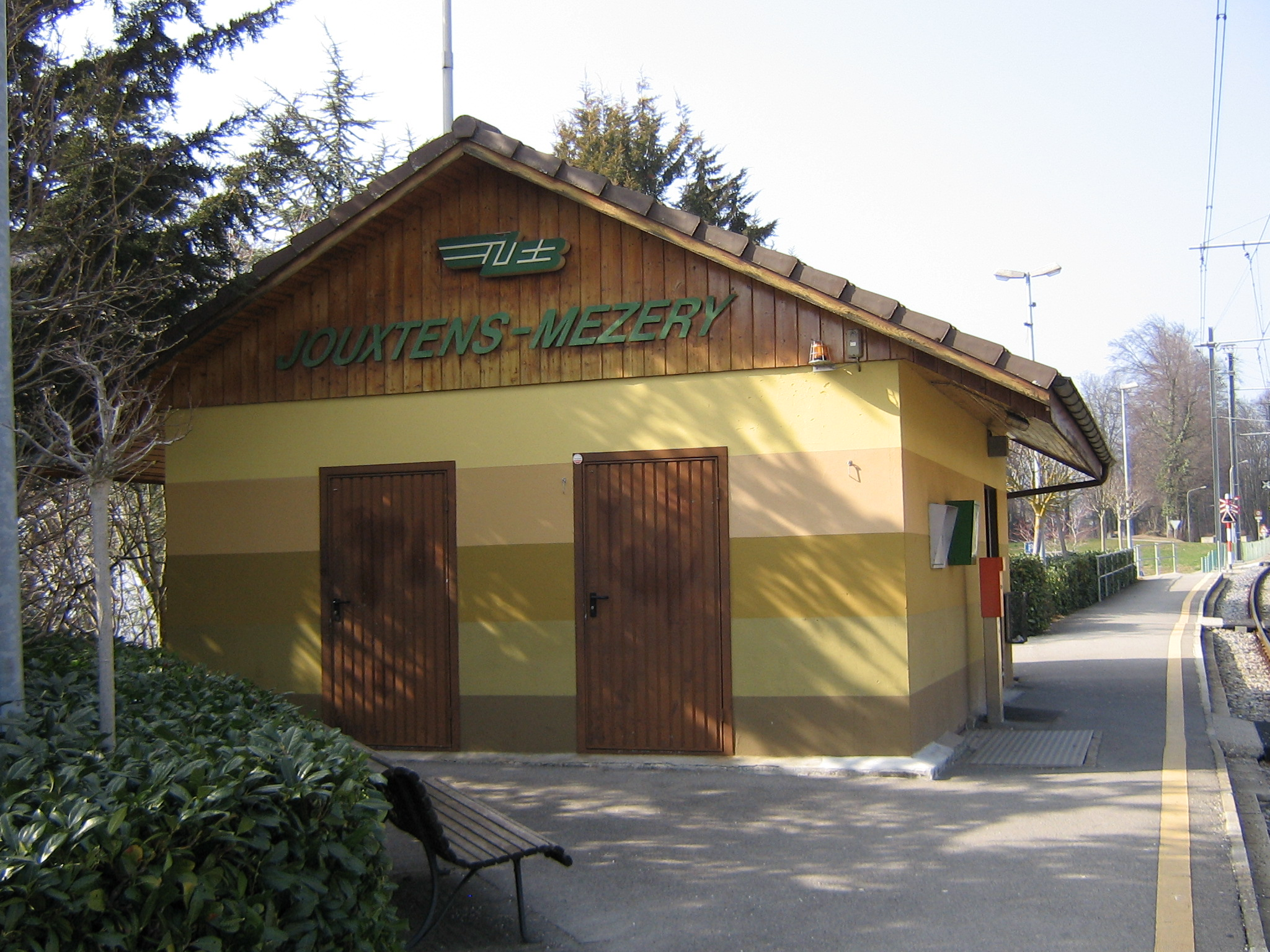
- Jouxtens-Mézery train station

- Flag Coat of arms
- Location of Jouxtens-Mézery
- Location within Switzerland Location within Canton of Vaud
- Coordinates: 46°33′N 06°36′E
- Country: Switzerland
- Canton: Vaud
- District: Lausanne

Government
  - Mayor: Syndic; M. Serge Roy

Area
  - Total: 1.93 km^{2} (0.75 sq mi)
- Elevation: 525 m (1,722 ft)

Population (2003)
  - Total: 1,278
  - Density: 662/km^{2} (1,720/sq mi)
- Time zone: UTC+01:00 (CET)
  - Summer (DST): UTC+02:00 (CEST)
- Postal code: 1008
- SFOS number: 5585
- ISO 3166 code: CH-VD
- Surrounded by: Lausanne, Prilly, Renens, Romanel-sur-Lausanne
- Website: www.jouxtens-mezery.ch

Jouxtens-Mézery is a municipality in the district of Lausanne in the canton of Vaud in Switzerland. It is a suburb of the city of Lausanne, comprising the neighbourhoods of Jouxtens and Mézery.

== History ==
Jouxtens is first mentioned in 1185 as Jotens. Mézery is first mentioned in 929 as Masiriaco. The remains of a large roman villa have been found in Mézery, complete with baths and coins from the reigns of Augustus to Constantine. Viticulture has been practised since the 10th century.

A railway station opened in the municipality in 1887, as a simple stop on the Lausanne–Échallens–Bercher line. The station was originally known as Jouxtens-Cery, but was renamed Jouxtens-Mézery around 1900. Between 1964 and 2020, there was a second station in the municipality, on the same line, with the name Le Lussex.

Jouxtens-Mézery was unaffected by the changes to the composition of the district of Lausanne on 31 August 2006, remaining part of that district.

== Geography ==
Jouxtens-Mézery is located in the suburbs of the city of Lausanne and consists of the neighbourhoods of Jouxtens (525 metres or 1,722 feet above sea level) and Mézery (555 metres or 1,821 feet above sea level) on the slope above Renens. It lies some 4 kilometres (2.5 mi) north-west of the centre of the city. Neighboring municipalities of Jouxtens-Mézery are Romanel-sur-Lausanne, Prilly, Renens, Crissier and an exclave of Lausanne.

The municipality has an area, as of 2009, of 1.93–1.92 square kilometers (0.75–0.74 mi^{2}) (depending on calculation method). Of this area, 0.79 km^{2} (0.31 mi^{2}) or 40.9% is used for agricultural purposes, while 0.21 km^{2} (0.081 mi^{2}) or 10.9% is forested. Of the rest of the land, 0.92 km^{2} (0.36 mi^{2}) or 47.7% is settled (buildings or roads).

Of the built up area, housing and buildings made up 35.2% and transportation infrastructure made up 8.8%. Power and water infrastructure as well as other special developed areas made up 2.1% of the area Out of the forested land, 7.8% of the total land area is heavily forested and 3.1% is covered with orchards or small clusters of trees. Of the agricultural land, 33.7% is used for growing crops and 3.6% is pastures, while 3.6% is used for orchards or vine crops.

== Government ==
=== Politics ===
In the 2007 federal election the most popular party was the Green Party which received 23.34% of the vote. The next three most popular parties were the SVP (16.55%), the SP (13.87%) and the FDP (13.67%). In the federal election, a total of 503 votes were cast, and the voter turnout was 61.5%.

=== Coat of arms ===
The blazon of the municipal coat of arms is Per pale Argent and Gules, on a bend counterchanged three Fleurs-de-lys Or.

== Demographics ==
Jouxtens-Mézery has a population (as of December 2020) of 1,412. As of 2008, 17.7% of the population are resident foreign nationals. Over the last 10 years (1999–2009 ) the population has changed at a rate of 14.7%. It has changed at a rate of 11.2% due to migration and at a rate of 3.9% due to births and deaths.

Most of the population (as of 2000) speaks French (999 or 87.2%), with German being second most common (65 or 5.7%) and Portuguese being third (18 or 1.6%). There are 14 people who speak Italian.

Of the population in the municipality 157 or about 13.7% were born in Jouxtens-Mézery and lived there in 2000. There were 490 or 42.8% who were born in the same canton, while 214 or 18.7% were born somewhere else in Switzerland, and 257 or 22.4% were born outside of Switzerland.

In 2008 there were 2 live births to Swiss citizens and 2 births to non-Swiss citizens, and in same time span there were 5 deaths of Swiss citizens and 1 non-Swiss citizen death. Ignoring immigration and emigration, the population of Swiss citizens decreased by 3 while the foreign population increased by 1. There were 3 Swiss women who immigrated back to Switzerland. At the same time, there were 5 non-Swiss men who emigrated from Switzerland to another country and 2 non-Swiss women who immigrated from another country to Switzerland. The total Swiss population change in 2008 (from all sources, including moves across municipal borders) was an increase of 37 and the non-Swiss population decreased by 8 people. This represents a population growth rate of 2.2%.

The age distribution, as of 2009, in Jouxtens-Mézery is; 133 children or 9.9% of the population are between 0 and 9 years old and 200 teenagers or 14.9% are between 10 and 19. Of the adult population, 141 people or 10.5% of the population are between 20 and 29 years old. 126 people or 9.4% are between 30 and 39, 222 people or 16.6% are between 40 and 49, and 213 people or 15.9% are between 50 and 59. The senior population distribution is 188 people or 14.0% of the population are between 60 and 69 years old, 81 people or 6.0% are between 70 and 79, there are 30 people or 2.2% who are between 80 and 89, and there are 6 people or 0.4% who are 90 and older.

As of 2000, there were 483 people who were single and never married in the municipality. There were 592 married individuals, 33 widows or widowers and 37 individuals who are divorced.

As of 2000, there were 391 private households in the municipality, and an average of 2.9 persons per household. There were 72 households that consist of only one person and 49 households with five or more people. Out of a total of 399 households that answered this question, 18.0% were households made up of just one person and there were 2 adults who lived with their parents. Of the rest of the households, there are 97 married couples without children, 203 married couples with children There were 14 single parents with a child or children. There were 3 households that were made up of unrelated people and 8 households that were made up of some sort of institution or another collective housing.

In 2000 there were 264 single family homes (or 81.0% of the total) out of a total of 326 inhabited buildings. There were 47 multi-family buildings (14.4%), along with 13 multi-purpose buildings that were mostly used for housing (4.0%) and 2 other use buildings (commercial or industrial) that also had some housing (0.6%). Of the single family homes 16 were built before 1919, while 70 were built between 1990 and 2000. The greatest number of single family homes (106) were built between 1981 and 1990. The greatest number of multi-family homes (11) were built before 1919 and again between 1971 and 1980.

In 2000 there were 416 apartments in the municipality. The most common apartment size was 5 rooms of which there were 106. There were 11 single room apartments and 251 apartments with five or more rooms. Of these apartments, a total of 376 apartments (90.4% of the total) were permanently occupied, while 28 apartments (6.7%) were seasonally occupied and 12 apartments (2.9%) were empty. As of 2009, the construction rate of new housing units was 0 new units per 1000 residents. The vacancy rate for the municipality, in 2010, was 0%.

The historical population is given in the following chart:

== Sights ==
The entire region of Jouxtens-Mézery is designated as part of the Inventory of Swiss Heritage Sites.

== Economy ==
As of 2010, Jouxtens-Mézery had an unemployment rate of 3.3%. As of 2008, there were 12 people employed in the primary economic sector and about 3 businesses involved in this sector. 35 people were employed in the secondary sector and there were 7 businesses in this sector. 67 people were employed in the tertiary sector, with 23 businesses in this sector. There were 553 residents of the municipality who were employed in some capacity, of which females made up 40.5% of the workforce.

In 2008 the total number of full-time equivalent jobs was 102. The number of jobs in the primary sector was 9, all of which were in agriculture. The number of jobs in the secondary sector was 34 of which 3 or (8.8%) were in manufacturing and 29 (85.3%) were in construction. The number of jobs in the tertiary sector was 59. In the tertiary sector; 7 or 11.9% were in wholesale or retail sales or the repair of motor vehicles, 8 or 13.6% were in the information industry, 1 was the insurance or financial industry, 8 or 13.6% were technical professionals or scientists, 10 or 16.9% were in education.

In 2000, there were 59 workers who commuted into the municipality and 467 workers who commuted away. The municipality is a net exporter of workers, with about 7.9 workers leaving the municipality for every one entering. Of the working population, 11.9% used public transportation to get to work, and 68.9% used a private car.

== Religion ==
From the 2000 census, 387 or 33.8% were Roman Catholic, while 430 or 37.6% belonged to the Swiss Reformed Church. Of the rest of the population, there were 18 members of an Orthodox church (or about 1.57% of the population), there was 1 individual who belongs to the Christian Catholic Church, and there were 104 individuals (or about 9.08% of the population) who belonged to another Christian church. There were 16 individuals (or about 1.40% of the population) who were Jewish, and 8 (or about 0.70% of the population) who were Islamic. There was 1 person who was Buddhist and 2 individuals who belonged to another church. 167 (or about 14.59% of the population) belonged to no church, are agnostic or atheist, and 55 individuals (or about 4.80% of the population) did not answer the question.

== Transport ==
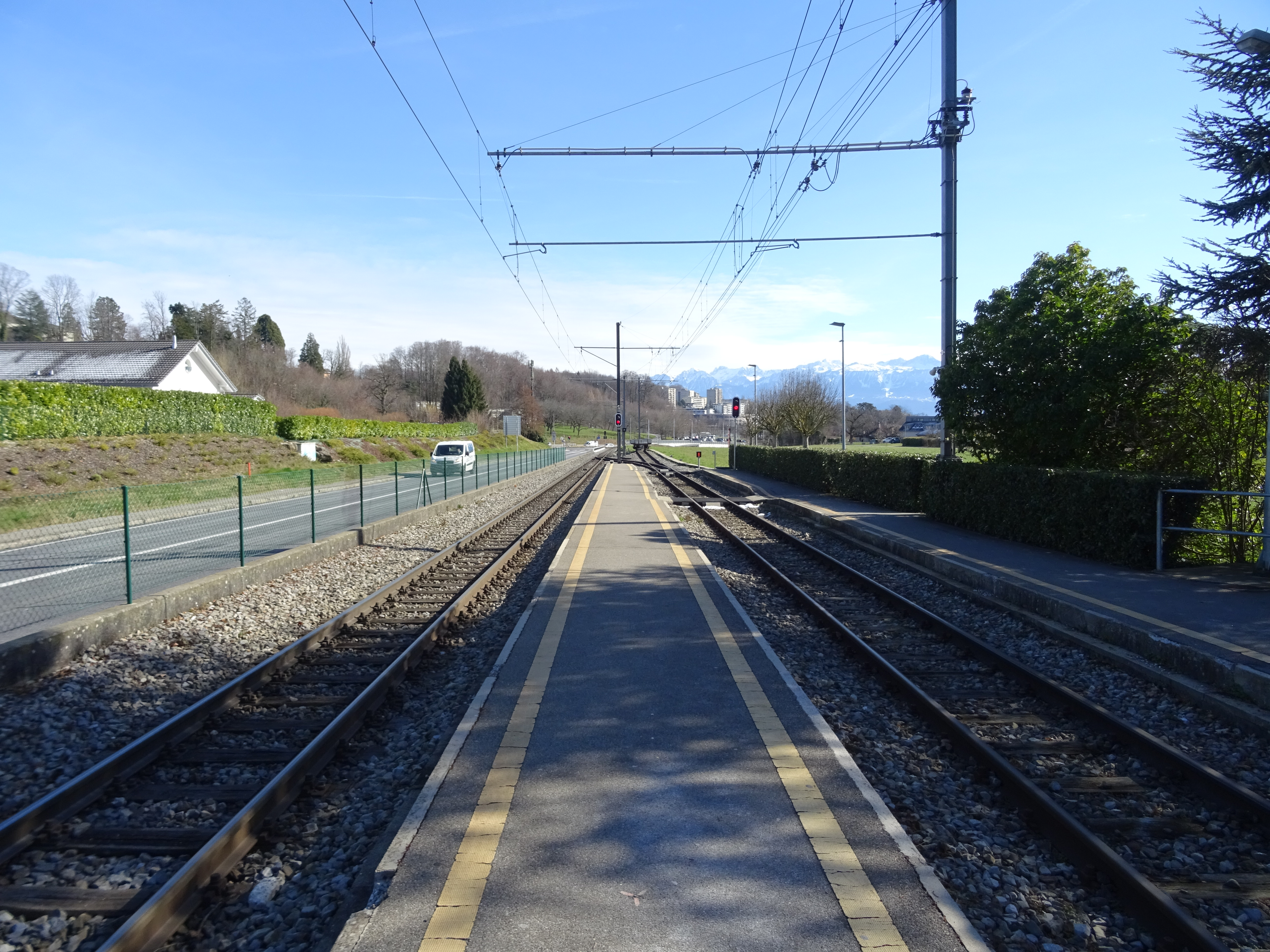
Jouxtens-Mézery station and the Lausanne to Neuchâtel road

=== Railway ===
The municipality has a railway station, Jouxtens-Mézery, on the suburban Lausanne–Échallens–Bercher line. The station provides a service every fifteen minutes between Jouxtens-Mézery and Lausanne, and between Jouxtens-Mézery and Échallens, with every other train continuing from Échallens to Bercher.

=== Road ===
Jouxtens-Mézery is situated on the main road (route 5) that, prior to the construction of the Swiss motorway network, linked Lausanne with Échallens, Yverdon, Neuchâtel and points north. It is now located near the A1 and A9 motorways that provide links throughout, and beyond, Switzerland.

== Education ==
In Jouxtens-Mézery about 363 or (31.7%) of the population have completed non-mandatory upper secondary education, and 310 or (27.1%) have completed additional higher education (either university or a Fachhochschule). Of the 310 who completed tertiary schooling, 51.6% were Swiss men, 31.3% were Swiss women, 10.0% were non-Swiss men and 7.1% were non-Swiss women.

In the 2009/2010 school year there were a total of 157 students in the Jouxtens-Mézery school district. In the Vaud cantonal school system, two years of non-obligatory pre-school are provided by the political districts. During the school year, the political district provided pre-school care for a total of 2,648 children of which 1,947 children (73.5%) received subsidized pre-school care. The canton's primary school program requires students to attend for four years. There were 76 students in the municipal primary school program. The obligatory lower secondary school program lasts for six years and there were 79 students in those schools. There were also 2 students who were home schooled or attended another non-traditional school.

As of 2000, there were 28 students in Jouxtens-Mézery who came from another municipality, while 186 residents attended schools outside the municipality.
