= Épalinges =

- Municipality
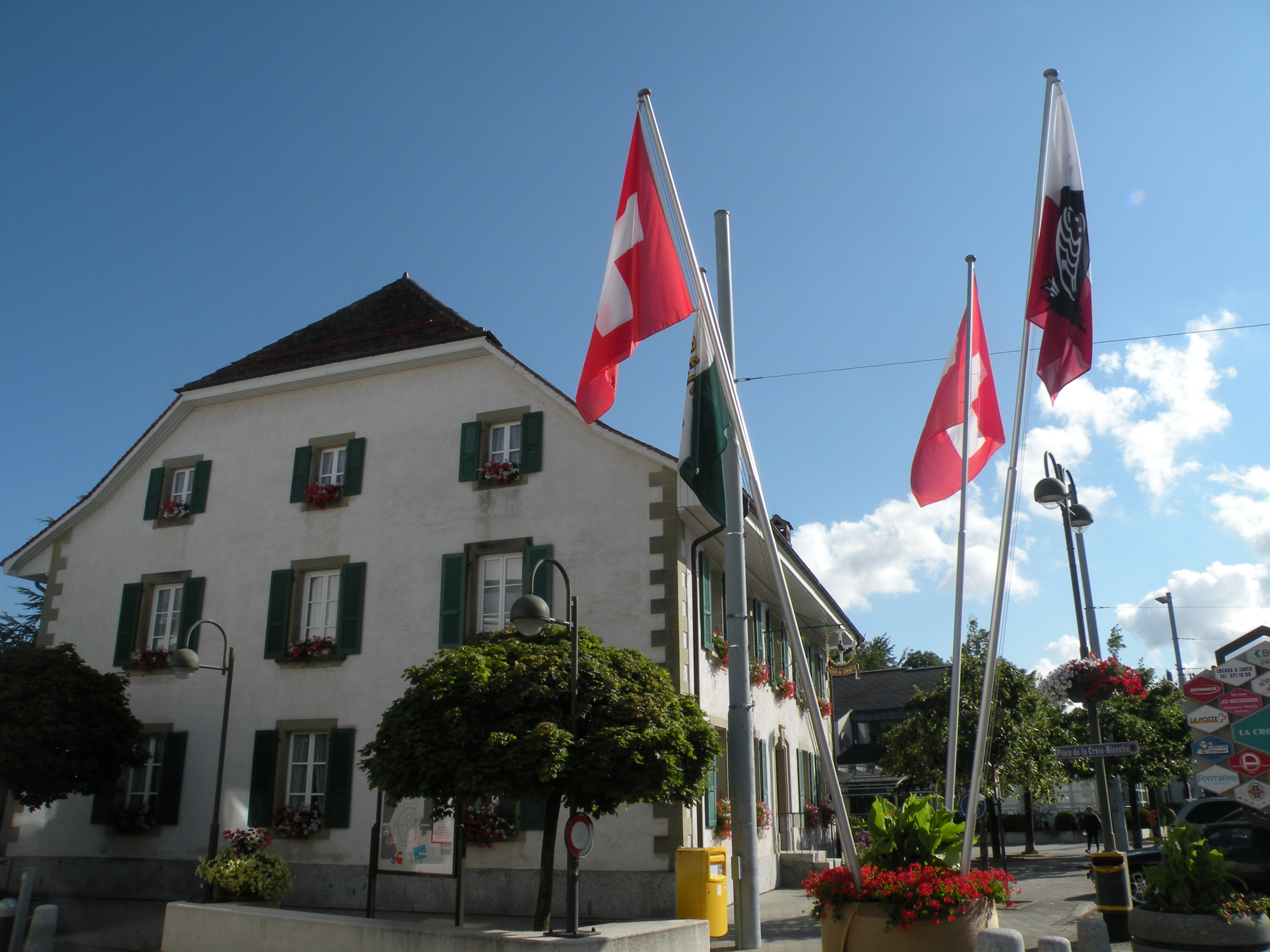
- Epalinges town hall

- Flag Coat of arms
- Location of Épalinges
- Location within Switzerland Location within Canton of Vaud
- Coordinates: 46°33′N 06°40′E
- Country: Switzerland
- Canton: Vaud
- District: Lausanne

Government
  - Mayor: Syndic; Alain Monod

Area
  - Total: 4.57 km^{2} (1.76 sq mi)
- Elevation: 785 m (2,575 ft)

Population (2003)
  - Total: 7,601
  - Density: 1,660/km^{2} (4,310/sq mi)
- Time zone: UTC+01:00 (CET)
  - Summer (DST): UTC+02:00 (CEST)
- Postal code: 1066
- SFOS number: 5584
- ISO 3166 code: CH-VD
- Surrounded by: Le Mont-sur-Lausanne, Lausanne
- Website: www.epalinges.ch

Épalinges (French pronunciation: [epalɛ̃ʒ]; Arpitan: Epalinjo) is a municipality in the district of Lausanne in the canton of Vaud in Switzerland.

It is a suburb of the city of Lausanne.

== History ==
Épalinges is first mentioned in 1182 as de Spanengis.

== Geography ==
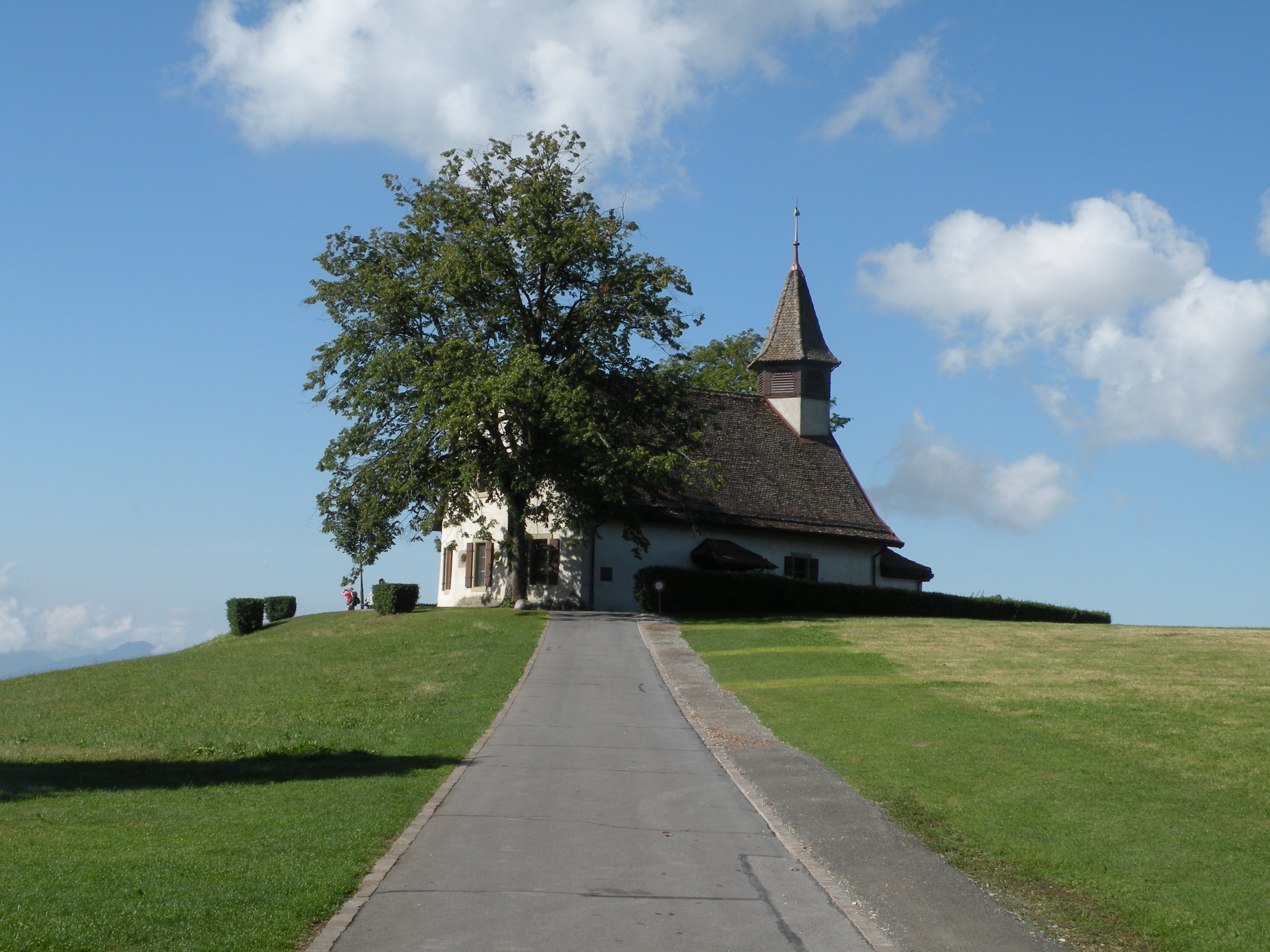
A church in Épalinges

Aerial view (1964)

Épalinges has an area, as of 2009, of 4.57 square kilometres (1.76 mi^{2}). Of this area, 0.86 km^{2} (0.33 mi^{2}) or 18.8% is used for agricultural purposes, while 1.17 km^{2} (0.45 mi^{2}) or 25.6% is forested. Of the rest of the land, 2.59 km^{2} (1.00 mi^{2}) or 56.7% is settled (buildings or roads).

Of the built up area, housing and buildings made up 42.7% and transportation infrastructure made up 8.3%. Power and water infrastructure as well as other special developed areas made up 1.3% of the area while parks, green belts and sports fields made up 3.5%. Out of the forested land, 24.1% of the total land area is heavily forested and 1.5% is covered with orchards or small clusters of trees. Of the agricultural land, 10.7% is used for growing crops and 6.8% is pastures, while 1.3% is used for orchards or vine crops.

The municipality was part of the Lausanne District until it was dissolved on 31 August 2006, and Épalinges became part of the new district of Lausanne.

The municipality is surrounded by Lausanne. It consists of the villages of Épalinges-Village, Les Croisettes, La Croix-Blanche and multiple hamlets.

== Coat of arms ==
The blazon of the municipal coat of arms is Per fess Argent and Gules, a Gander Sable lined of the first and beaked of the second overall.

== Demographics ==
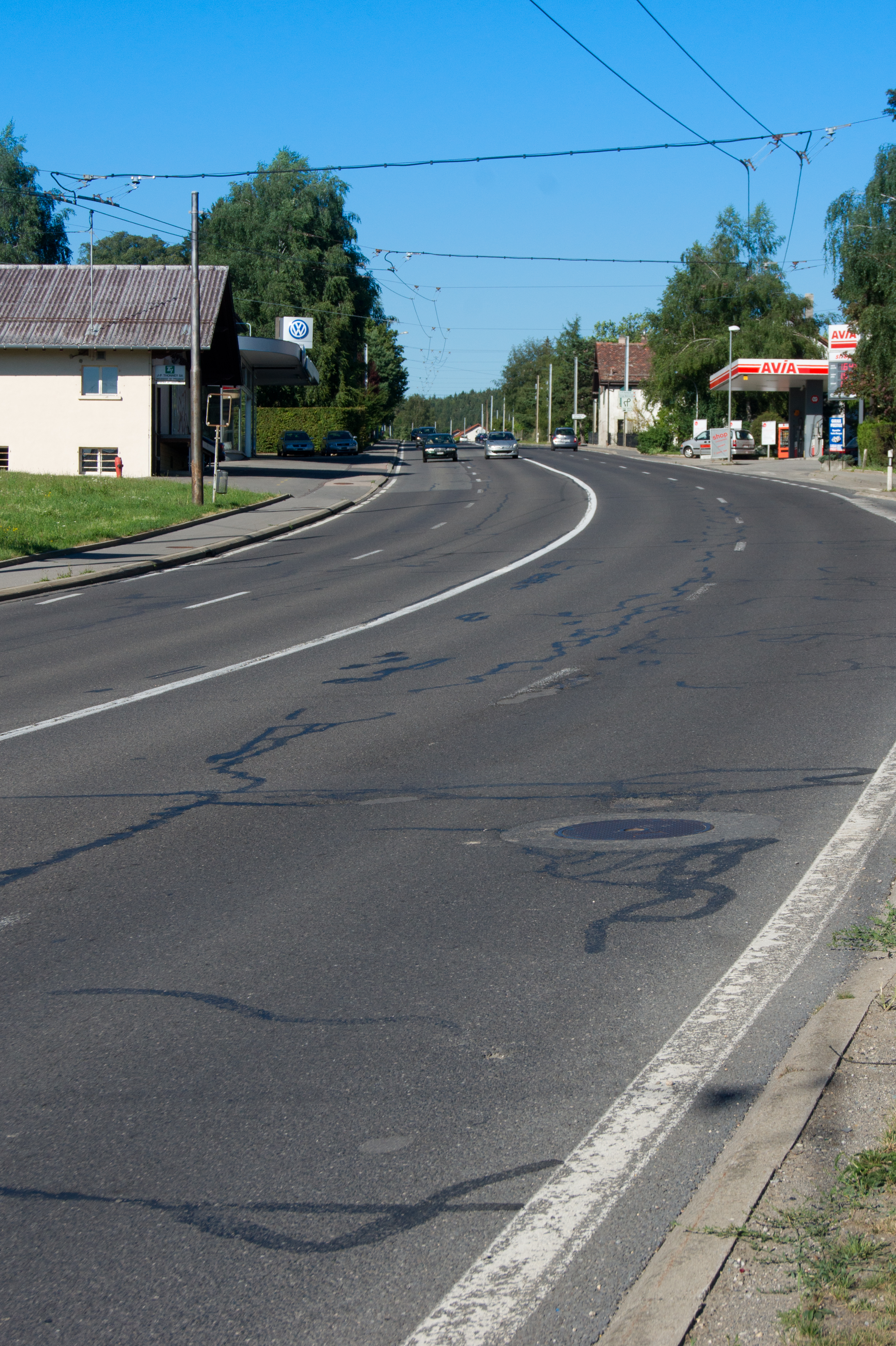
Road between Bern and Lausanne at Épalinges

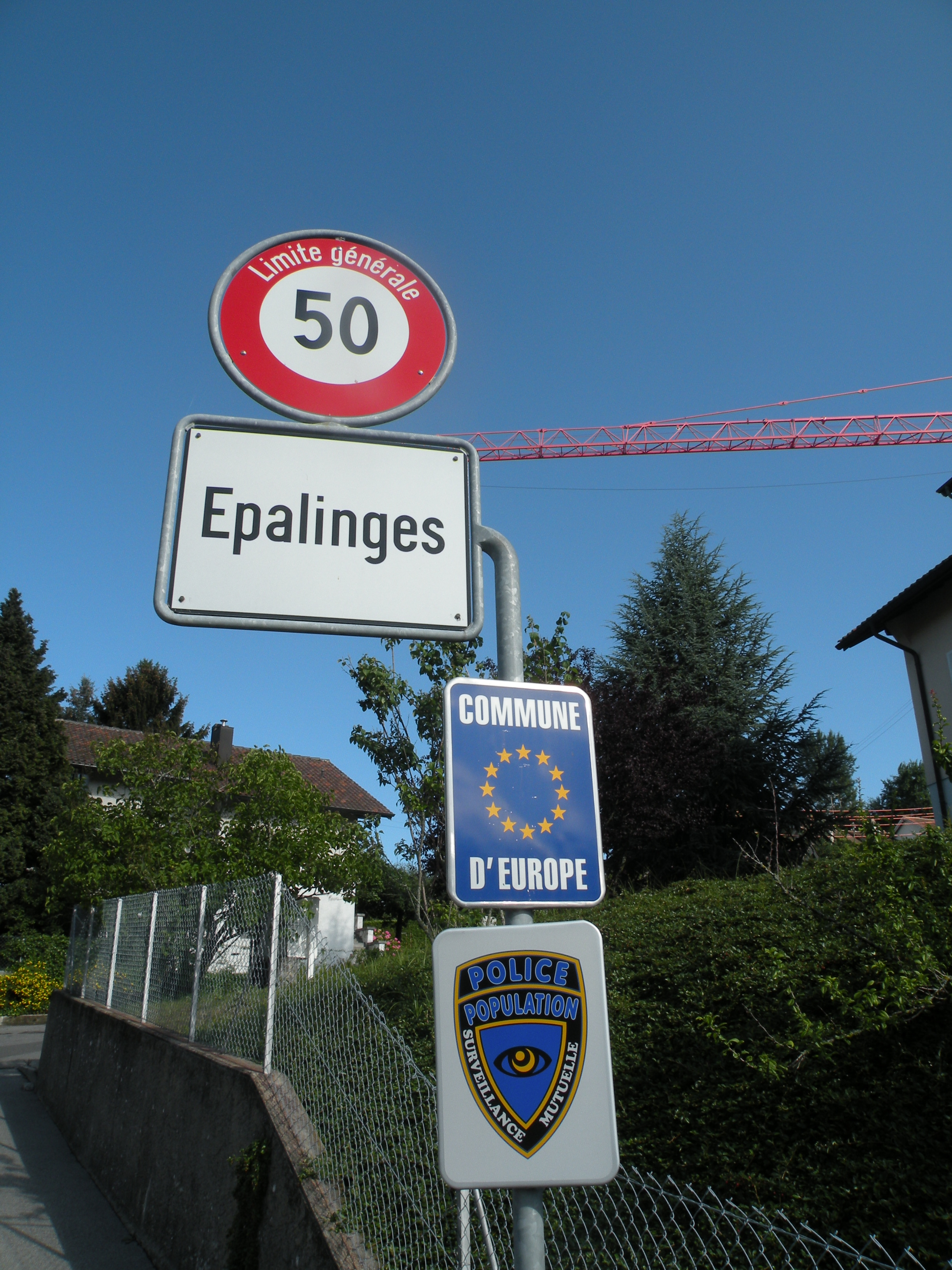
Entrance to the municipality

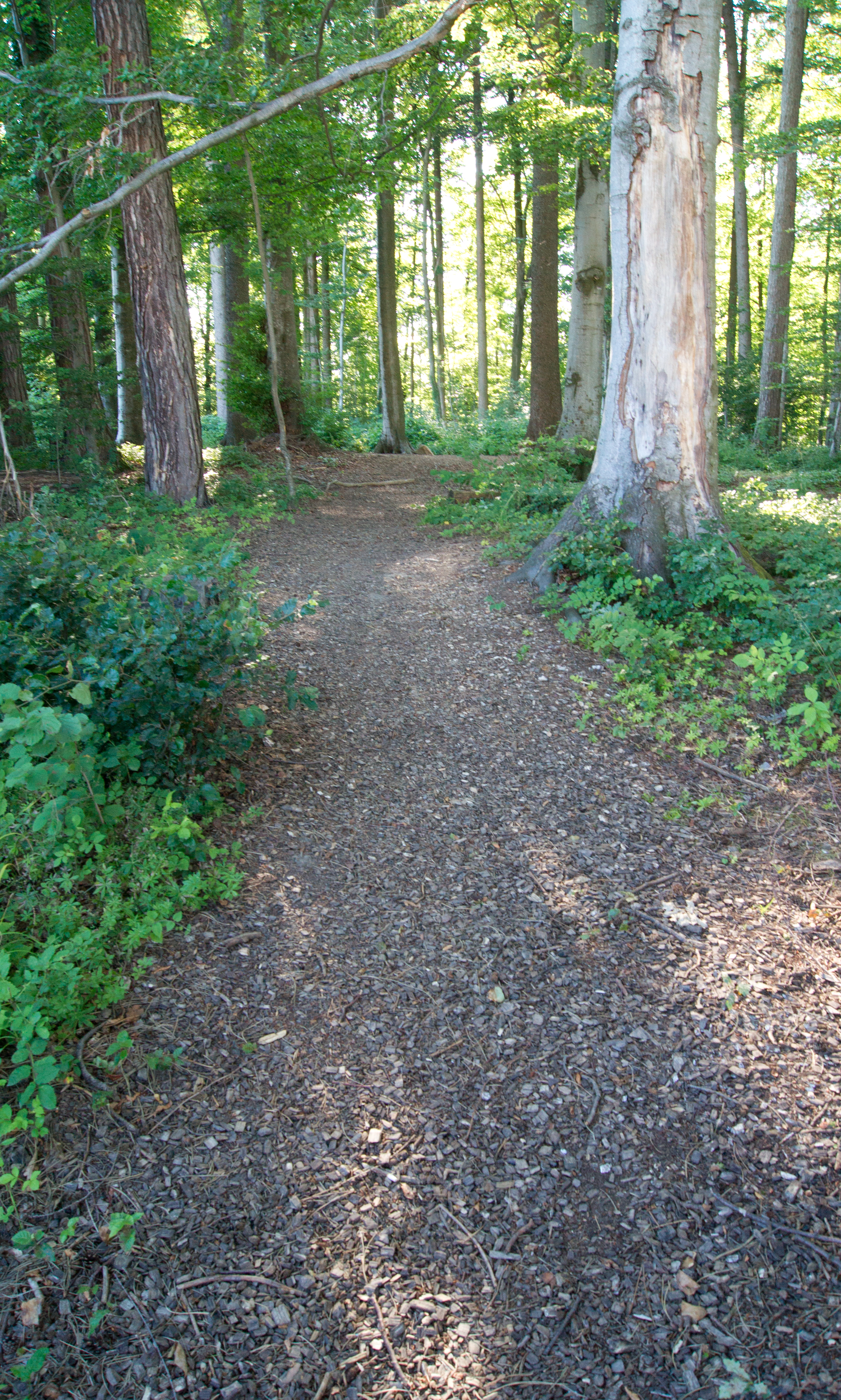
Forest in Épalinges

People from Épalinges are known as Palinsards.

Épalinges has a population (as of December 2020) of 9,769. As of 2008, 23.2% of the population are resident foreign nationals. Over the last 10 years (1999–2009) the population has changed at a rate of 12.4%. It has changed at a rate of 7.6% due to migration and at a rate of 5.2% due to births and deaths.

Most of the population (as of 2000) speaks French (6,386 or 85.0%), with German being second most common (410 or 5.5%) and English being third (149 or 2.0%). There are 148 people who speak Italian and 5 people who speak Romansh.

Of the population in the municipality 1,190 or about 15.8% were born in Épalinges and lived there in 2000. There were 2,824 or 37.6% who were born in the same canton, while 1,358 or 18.1% were born somewhere else in Switzerland, and 1,971 or 26.2% were born outside of Switzerland.

In 2008 there were 44 live births to Swiss citizens and 26 births to non-Swiss citizens, and in same time span there were 35 deaths of Swiss citizens and 4 non-Swiss citizen deaths. Ignoring immigration and emigration, the population of Swiss citizens increased by 9 while the foreign population increased by 22. There were 4 Swiss men who immigrated back to Switzerland and 7 Swiss women who emigrated from Switzerland. At the same time, there were 51 non-Swiss men and 45 non-Swiss women who immigrated from another country to Switzerland. The total Swiss population change in 2008 (from all sources, including moves across municipal borders) was an increase of 99 and the non-Swiss population increased by 111 people. This represents a population growth rate of 2.6%.

The age distribution, as of 2009, in Épalinges is; 953 children or 11.4% of the population are between 0 and 9 years old and 1,072 teenagers or 12.8% are between 10 and 19. Of the adult population, 1,043 people or 12.5% of the population are between 20 and 29 years old. 1,086 people or 13.0% are between 30 and 39, 1,295 people or 15.5% are between 40 and 49, and 1,078 people or 12.9% are between 50 and 59. The senior population distribution is 910 people or 10.9% of the population are between 60 and 69 years old, 595 people or 7.1% are between 70 and 79, there are 271 people or 3.2% who are between 80 and 89, and there are 43 people or 0.5% who are 90 and older.

As of 2000, there were 3,114 people who were single and never married in the municipality. There were 3,680 married individuals, 333 widows or widowers and 389 individuals who are divorced.

As of 2000, there were 3,160 private households in the municipality, and an average of 2.3 persons per household. There were 983 households that consist of only one person and 183 households with five or more people. Out of a total of 3,216 households that answered this question, 30.6% were households made up of just one person and there were 11 adults who lived with their parents. Of the rest of the households, there are 888 married couples without children, 1,032 married couples with children. There were 194 single parents with a child or children. There were 52 households that were made up of unrelated people and 56 households that were made up of some sort of institution or another collective housing.

In 2000 there were 852 single family homes (or 68.5% of the total) out of a total of 1,244 inhabited buildings. There were 269 multi-family buildings (21.6%), along with 92 multi-purpose buildings that were mostly used for housing (7.4%) and 31 other use buildings (commercial or industrial) that also had some housing (2.5%). Of the single family homes 49 were built before 1919, while 118 were built between 1990 and 2000. The greatest number of single family homes (227) were built between 1981 and 1990. The most multi-family homes (54) were built between 1981 and 1990 and the next most (41) were built between 1961 and 1970. There were 38 multi-family houses built between 1996 and 2000.

In 2000 there were 3,468 apartments in the municipality. The most common apartment size was 4 rooms of which there were 896. There were 207 single room apartments and 1,083 apartments with five or more rooms. Of these apartments, a total of 3,106 apartments (89.6% of the total) were permanently occupied, while 310 apartments (8.9%) were seasonally occupied and 52 apartments (1.5%) were empty. As of 2009, the construction rate of new housing units was 11.1 new units per 1000 residents. The vacancy rate for the municipality, in 2010, was 0.96%.

The historical population is given in the following chart:

== Politics ==
In the 2007 federal election the most popular party was the SP which received 22.87% of the vote. The next three most popular parties were the SVP (17.28%), the Green Party (15.89%) and the FDP (15.44%). In the federal election, a total of 2,387 votes were cast, and the voter turnout was 49.5%.

== Economy ==
Épalinges hosts the Swiss Institute for Experimental Cancer Research (ISREC), a private not-for-profit foundation founded in 1964, as well as the Health Sciences eTraining Foundation (HSeT), a non-profit organization dedicated to web-based learning and teaching activities in the field of health sciences.

As of 2010, Épalinges had an unemployment rate of 4%. As of 2008, there were 6 people employed in the primary economic sector and about 3 businesses involved in this sector. 212 people were employed in the secondary sector and there were 31 businesses in this sector. 1,697 people were employed in the tertiary sector, with 201 businesses in this sector. There were 3,781 residents of the municipality who were employed in some capacity, of which females made up 45.8% of the workforce.

In 2008 the total number of full-time equivalent jobs was 1,591. The number of jobs in the primary sector was 3, all of which were in agriculture. The number of jobs in the secondary sector was 198 of which 71 or (35.9%) were in manufacturing and 127 (64.1%) were in construction. The number of jobs in the tertiary sector was 1,390. In the tertiary sector; 255 or 18.3% were in wholesale or retail sales or the repair of motor vehicles, 35 or 2.5% were in the movement and storage of goods, 70 or 5.0% were in a hotel or restaurant, 24 or 1.7% were in the information industry, 18 or 1.3% were the insurance or financial industry, 416 or 29.9% were technical professionals or scientists, 137 or 9.9% were in education and 278 or 20.0% were in health care.

In 2000, there were 1,241 workers who commuted into the municipality and 3,057 workers who commuted away. The municipality is a net exporter of workers, with about 2.5 workers leaving the municipality for every one entering. About 1.9% of the workforce coming into Épalinges are coming from outside Switzerland. Of the working population, 24.7% used public transportation to get to work, and 60% used a private car.

== Religion ==
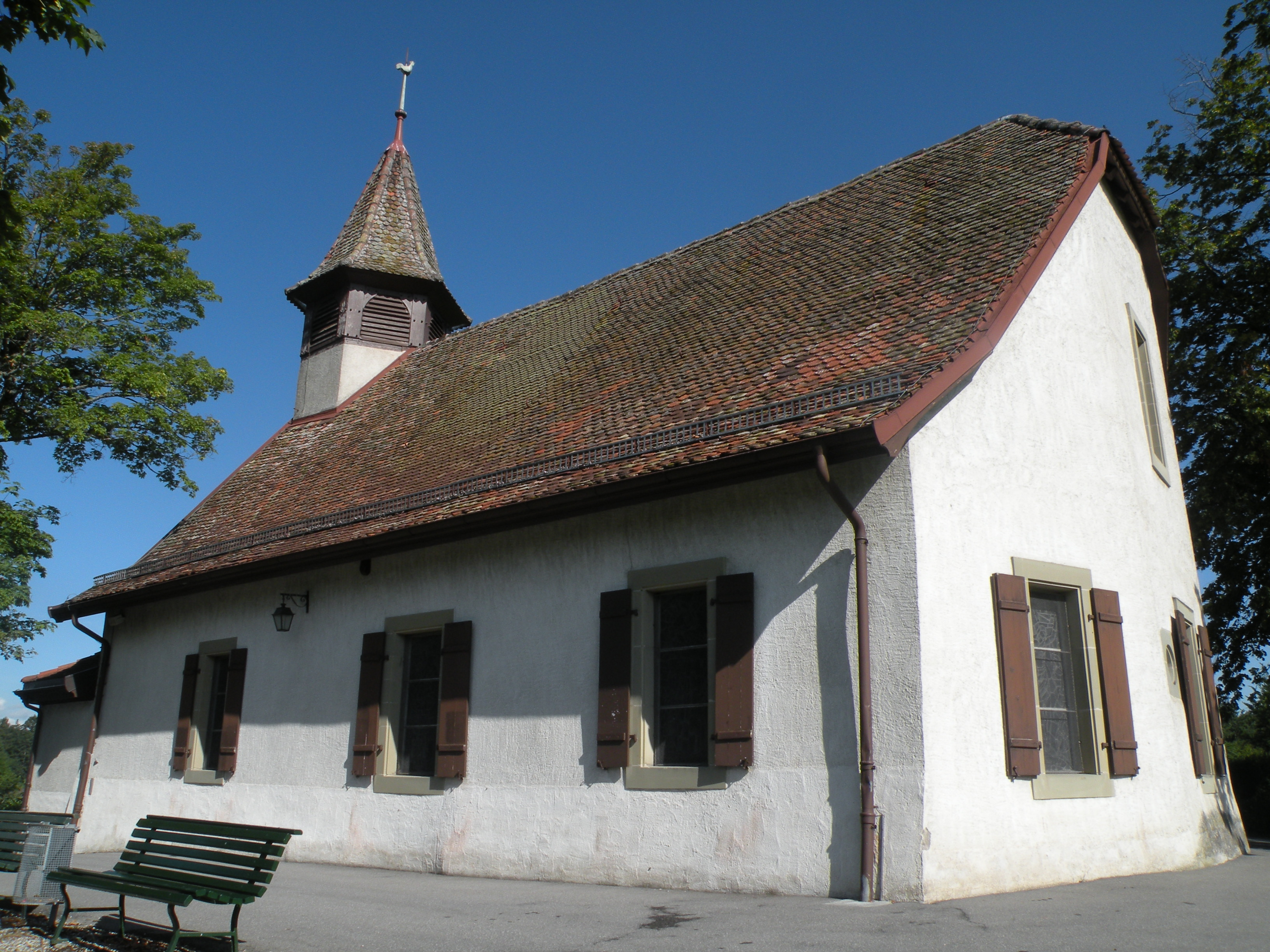
The church of Épalinges

From the 2000 census, 2,666 or 35.5% were Roman Catholic, while 2,845 or 37.9% belonged to the Swiss Reformed Church. Of the rest of the population, there were 69 members of an Orthodox church (or about 0.92% of the population), there were 4 individuals (or about 0.05% of the population) who belonged to the Christian Catholic Church, and there were 435 individuals (or about 5.79% of the population) who belonged to another Christian church. There were 43 individuals (or about 0.57% of the population) who were Jewish, and 199 (or about 2.65% of the population) who were Islamic. There were 22 individuals who were Buddhist, 11 individuals who were Hindu and 15 individuals who belonged to another church. 1,100 (or about 14.64% of the population) belonged to no church, are agnostic or atheist, and 315 individuals (or about 4.19% of the population) did not answer the question.

== Education ==
In Épalinges about 2,685 or (35.7%) of the population have completed non-mandatory upper secondary education, and 1,738 or (23.1%) have completed additional higher education (either university or a Fachhochschule). Of the 1,738 who completed tertiary schooling, 49.0% were Swiss men, 29.3% were Swiss women, 12.7% were non-Swiss men and 9.0% were non-Swiss women.

In the 2009/2010 school year there were a total of 976 students in the Épalinges school district. In the Vaud cantonal school system, two years of non-obligatory pre-school are provided by the political districts. During the school year, the political district provided pre-school care for a total of 2,648 children of which 1,947 children (73.5%) received subsidized pre-school care. The canton's primary school program requires students to attend for four years. There were 544 students in the municipal primary school program. The obligatory lower secondary school program lasts for six years and there were 405 students in those schools. There were also 27 students who were home schooled or attended another non-traditional school.

As of 2000, there were 77 students in Épalinges who came from another municipality, while 679 residents attended schools outside the municipality.

== Sports ==
The General Secretariat of the European Golf Association (EGA) is located in Épalinges. Golf Club de Lausanne, the site of 1982 Eisenhower Trophy, 1997 Ladies Swiss Open and several Swiss Amateur Championships, is also partly located in the municipality.

== Notable residents ==
- Thomas "Loel" Guinness and Gloria Guinness lived at Villa Zanroc on Chemin de Ballègue 58.
- Dolores Guinness, Socialite
- Loel Patrick Guinness
- Jean Marie Pierre Hubert Taittinger from 1923 to 2012
- Georges Simenon, from 1962 to 1973, Writer
- Ingvar Kamprad, from 1976 to 2014, Founder of IKEA
- Derek Quinlan, Businessman
- Raymond Burki, a satirical drawer for daily newspaper 24 Heures was born in Épalinges
- Jean Tschabold, Gymnast
