= International School of Lausanne =

Location
- Chemin de la Grangette 2, 1052 Le Mont-sur-Lausanne; Switzerland
- Coordinates: 46.5447°N 6.6377°E

Information
- Type: Private, international school
- Founded: 1962
- Director: Frazer Cairns
- Grades: Reception 3 - Year 13
- Campus type: Urban
- Colors: Red, White, Blue
- Mascot: Wolfie
- Team name: ISL Wolves
- Website: https://www.isl.ch

The International School of Lausanne (ISL) is a luxury English-language private school located in the village of Le Mont-sur-Lausanne, just north of Lausanne, Switzerland. ISL was established as the English School of Lausanne in 1962, serving the needs of international and local families for an international primary or secondary education.

In 1963 it was renamed the Commonwealth-American School and in 1997 it became the International School of Lausanne.

In 2005 ISL moved from their campuses in Pully into a newly built campus. In September 2015 the school opened a 'South Campus' on adjoining land to facilitate an expansion of the school from approximately 630 students to 900 students. The South Campus, designed by Hannes Ehrensperger of CCHE Architecture et Design SA, doubled the total area of ISL and includes an auditorium with 400 seats. It had a price tag of 46 million francs (US$48 million).

The school offers the complete IB program (PYP, MYP and IBDP) from Reception 3 to Year 13. Tuition fees for the different programmes vary but the average tuition fee is around $50,000(USD) per year.

== Accreditation ==
ISL's (upper) secondary education (Middle and High School) is not approved as a Mittelschule/Collège/Liceo by the Swiss Federal State Secretariat for Education, Research and Innovation (SERI).

== Student body ==
As of 2024 the school has 863 students from 70 countries.

== IB Programme ==
The International School of Lausanne has followed the IB system since September 2000. Since then 19 graduating classes have gone through the IB resulting in 91 graduating students. These students had an average of 98% pass rate and a mean score of 36.3 points, with 38% of the students receiving a bilingual diploma and 28% of the students achieving a grade between 40 and 45 points.
