= Lausanne District =

Coordinates: 46°31′16″N 6°38′28″E

Lausanne District District de Lausanne
- District
- Country: Switzerland
- Canton: Vaud
- Capital: Lausanne

Area
  - Total: 65.17 km^{2} (25.16 sq mi)

Population (2020)
  - Total: 168,127
  - Density: 2,580/km^{2} (6,682/sq mi)
- Time zone: UTC+1 (CET)
  - Summer (DST): UTC+2 (CEST)
- Municipalities: 6

Lausanne District (French: District de Lausanne) is a district in the canton of Vaud, Switzerland. The seat of the district is the city of Lausanne.

== Geography ==
Lausanne has an area, as of 2009, of 65.17 square kilometers (25.16 sq mi). Of this area, 17.79 km^{2} (6.87 sq mi) or 27.3% is used for agricultural purposes, while 20.13 km^{2} (7.77 sq mi) or 30.9% is forested. Of the rest of the land, 27.1 km^{2} (10.5 sq mi) or 41.6% is settled (buildings or roads) and 0.09 km^{2} (22 acres) or 0.1% is unproductive land.

== Demographics ==
Lausanne has a population (as of December 2020) of 168,127.

Most of the population (as of 2000) speaks French (159,559 or 79.6%), with German being second most common (8,534 or 4.3%) and Italian being third (7,942 or 4.0%). There are 99 people who speak Romansh.

Of the population in the district 46,742 or about 23.3% were born in Lausanne and lived there in 2000. There were 43,411 or 21.7% who were born in the same canton, while 34,479 or 17.2% were born somewhere else in Switzerland, and 68,966 or 34.4% were born outside of Switzerland.

In 2008 there were 978 live births to Swiss citizens and 671 births to non-Swiss citizens, and in same time span there were 976 deaths of Swiss citizens and 141 non-Swiss citizen deaths. Ignoring immigration and emigration, the population of Swiss citizens increased by 2 while the foreign population increased by 530. There were 15 Swiss men and 70 Swiss women who emigrated from Switzerland. At the same time, there were 2323 non-Swiss men and 1903 non-Swiss women who immigrated from another country to Switzerland. The total Swiss population change in 2008 (from all sources, including moves across municipal borders) was an increase of 1108 and the non-Swiss population increased by 2428 people. This represents a population growth rate of 2.5%.

The age distribution, as of 2009, in Lausanne is; 14,278 children or 9.7% of the population are between 0 and 9 years old and 14,983 teenagers or 10.1% are between 10 and 19. Of the adult population, 23,858 people or 16.2% of the population are between 20 and 29 years old. 25,113 people or 17.0% are between 30 and 39, 21,574 people or 14.6% are between 40 and 49, and 16,877 people or 11.4% are between 50 and 59. The senior population distribution is 13,513 people or 9.1% of the population are between 60 and 69 years old, 9,651 people or 6.5% are between 70 and 79, there are 6,567 people or 4.4% who are 80 and 89, and there are 1,275 people or 0.9% who are 90 and older.

As of 2000, there were 88,420 people who were single and never married in the district. There were 85,473 married individuals, 11,797 widows or widowers and 14,807 individuals who are divorced.

There were 43,415 households that consist of only one person and 3,821 households with five or more people. Out of a total of 97,876 households that answered this question, 44.4% were households made up of just one person and there were 476 adults who lived with their parents. Of the rest of the households, there are 21,984 married couples without children, 21,225 married couples with children There were 5,781 single parents with a child or children. There were 2,722 households that were made up of unrelated people and 2,273 households that were made up of some sort of institution or another collective housing.

The historical population is given in the following chart:

== Mergers and name changes ==
On 1 September 2006 the municipalities of Cheseaux-sur-Lausanne, Epalinges, Jouxtens-Mézery, Lausanne, Le Mont-sur-Lausanne and Romanel-sur-Lausanne came from the old Lausanne district to the new Lausanne district.

The municipalities of Belmont-sur-Lausanne, Paudex and Pully went to the new District de Lavaux-Oron.

The municipalities of Crissier, Prilly and Renens went to the new District de l'Ouest lausannois.

== Politics ==
In the 2007 federal election the most popular party was the SP which received 25.88% of the vote. The next three most popular parties were the Green Party (18.11%), the SVP (17.41%) and the FDP (11.33%). In the federal election, a total of 32,749 votes were cast, and the voter turnout was 43.9%.

== Religion ==
From the 2000 census, 76,732 or 38.3% were Roman Catholic, while 58,655 or 29.3% belonged to the Swiss Reformed Church. Of the rest of the population, there were 4,401 members of an Orthodox church (or about 2.20% of the population), there were 138 individuals (or about 0.07% of the population) who belonged to the Christian Catholic Church, and there were 4,043 individuals (or about 2.02% of the population) who belonged to another Christian church. There were 1,257 individuals (or about 0.63% of the population) who were Jewish, and 10,973 (or about 5.47% of the population) who were Islamic. There were 667 individuals who were Buddhist, 1,063 individuals who were Hindu and 489 individuals who belonged to another church. 30,469 (or about 15.20% of the population) belonged to no church, are agnostic or atheist, and 11,610 individuals (or about 5.79% of the population) did not answer the question.

== Education ==
In Lausanne about 66,152 or (33.0%) of the population have completed non-mandatory upper secondary education, and 35,615 or (17.8%) have completed additional higher education (either University or a Fachhochschule). Of the 35,615 who completed tertiary schooling, 42.1% were Swiss men, 30.1% were Swiss women, 16.1% were non-Swiss men and 11.7% were non-Swiss women.

In the 2009/2010 school year there were a total of 14,923 students in the local and district school systems. In the Vaud cantonal school system, two years of non-obligatory pre-school are provided by the political districts. During the school year, the district provided pre-school care for a total of 2,648 children. There were 1,947 (73.5%) children who received subsidized pre-school care. There were 8,024 students in the primary school program, which last four years. The obligatory lower secondary school program lasts for six years and there were 6,449 students in those schools. There were also 450 students who were home schooled or attended another non-traditional school.

== Municipalities ==
The following municipalities are located within the district:

Municipality	Population (31 December 2020)	Area km^{2}
Cheseaux-sur-Lausanne	4,360	4.59
Epalinges	9,769	4.57
Jouxtens-Mézery	1,412	1.93
Lausanne	140,202	41.38
Le Mont-sur-Lausanne	9,144	9.82
Romanel-sur-Lausanne	3,240	2.88
Total	168,127	65.17
