= Romanel-sur-Lausanne railway station =

Railway station in Romanel-sur-Lausanne, Switzerland

Romanel-sur-Lausanne
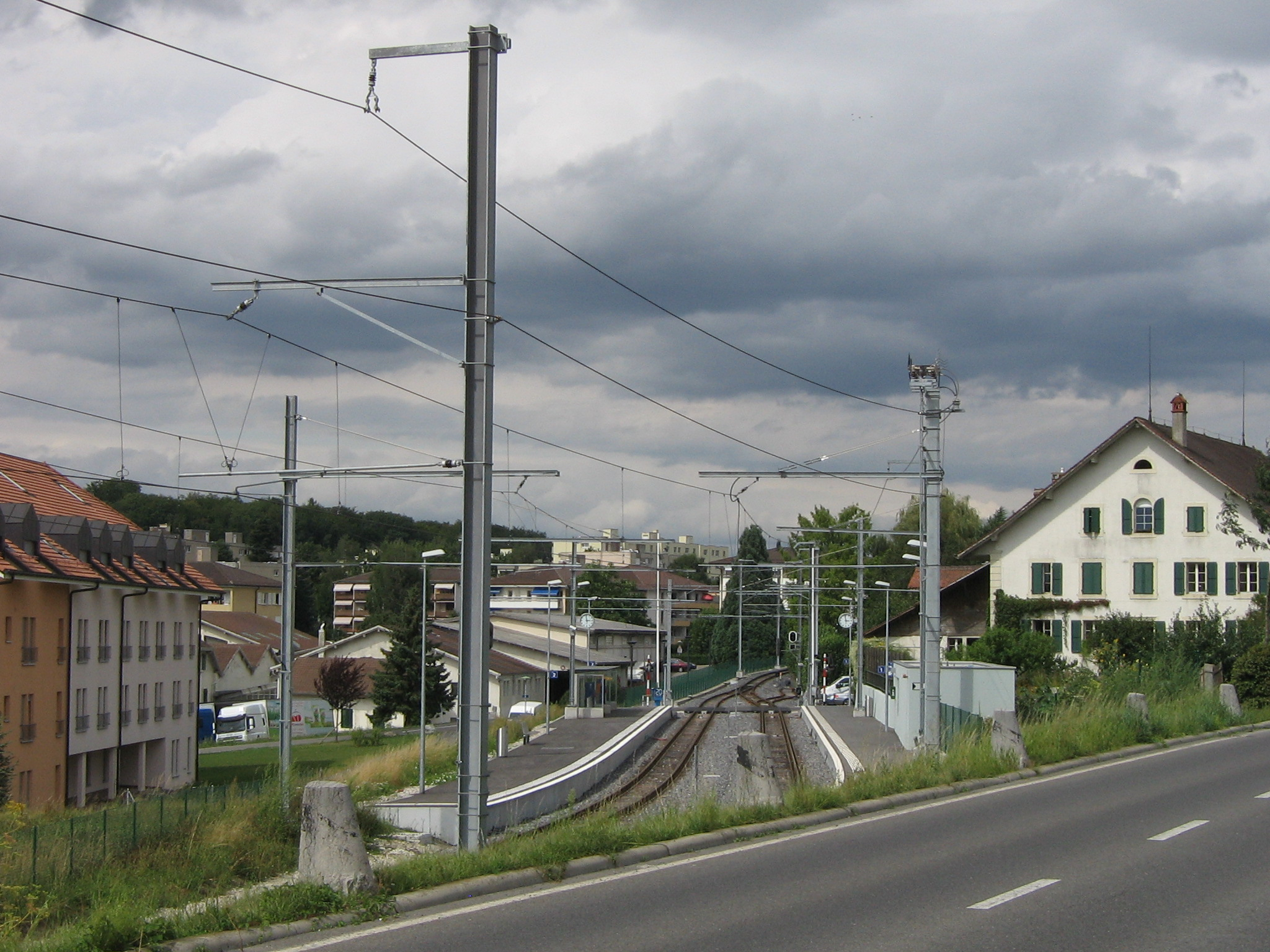
- View of the station after the rebuild in 2012

General information
- Location: Romanel-sur-Lausanne, Vaud; Switzerland
- Coordinates: 46°33′45″N 6°36′11″E
- Elevation: 591 m (1,939 ft)
- Owner: Chemin de fer Lausanne-Échallens-Bercher
- Line: Lausanne–Bercher line
- Distance: 5.9 km (3.7 mi) from Lausanne-Flon
- Platforms: 2 side platforms
- Tracks: 2
- Train operators: Chemin de fer Lausanne-Échallens-Bercher

Construction
- Accessible: Yes

Other information
- Station code: 8501166 (ROSL)
- Fare zone: 16 (mobilis)

History
- Opened: 1873
- Rebuilt: 1986-8; 2011-2
- Electrified: 7 December 1935

Services
Preceding station	LEB	Following station
Vernand-Camarès towards Echallens or Bercher	R20	Jouxtens-Mézery towards Lausanne-Flon
Location

Romanel-sur-Lausanne railway station (French: Gare de Romanel-sur-Lausanne), formerly known as Romanel-La Naz, is a railway station in the municipality of Romanel-sur-Lausanne, in the Swiss canton of Vaud. It is located on the 1,000 mm (3 ft 3 3/8 in) Lausanne–Bercher line of the Chemin de fer Lausanne-Échallens-Bercher (LEB).

== History ==
Romanel−La Naz station opened to service in 1873, as an intermediate station on the first section of the LEB between Chauderon and Cheseaux stations. The station had two tracks, but only one platform, with passengers being required to cross the tracks to reach trains on the further track. The line was electrified in 1935.

Between 1986 and 1988, the station was rebuilt, with the addition of a second plaform and a new platform shelter, and the demolition of the earlier station building. Between 2011 and 2012, the station underwent further major renovations, with tracks and overhead contact line replaced, and new platforms and shelters constructed.

As of October 2025, work is underway to extend the platforms to 130 metres (430 ft) in length, and to provide an underpass, ramps and stairs compliant with accessibility standards. Work started in 2024 and is expected to be complete in early 2026.

== Services ==
As of the December 2023 timetable change, the following services stop at Romanel-sur-Lausanne:

- Regio: service every fifteen minutes between Lausanne-Flon and Echallens, with every other train continuing from Echallens to Bercher.

== Gallery ==
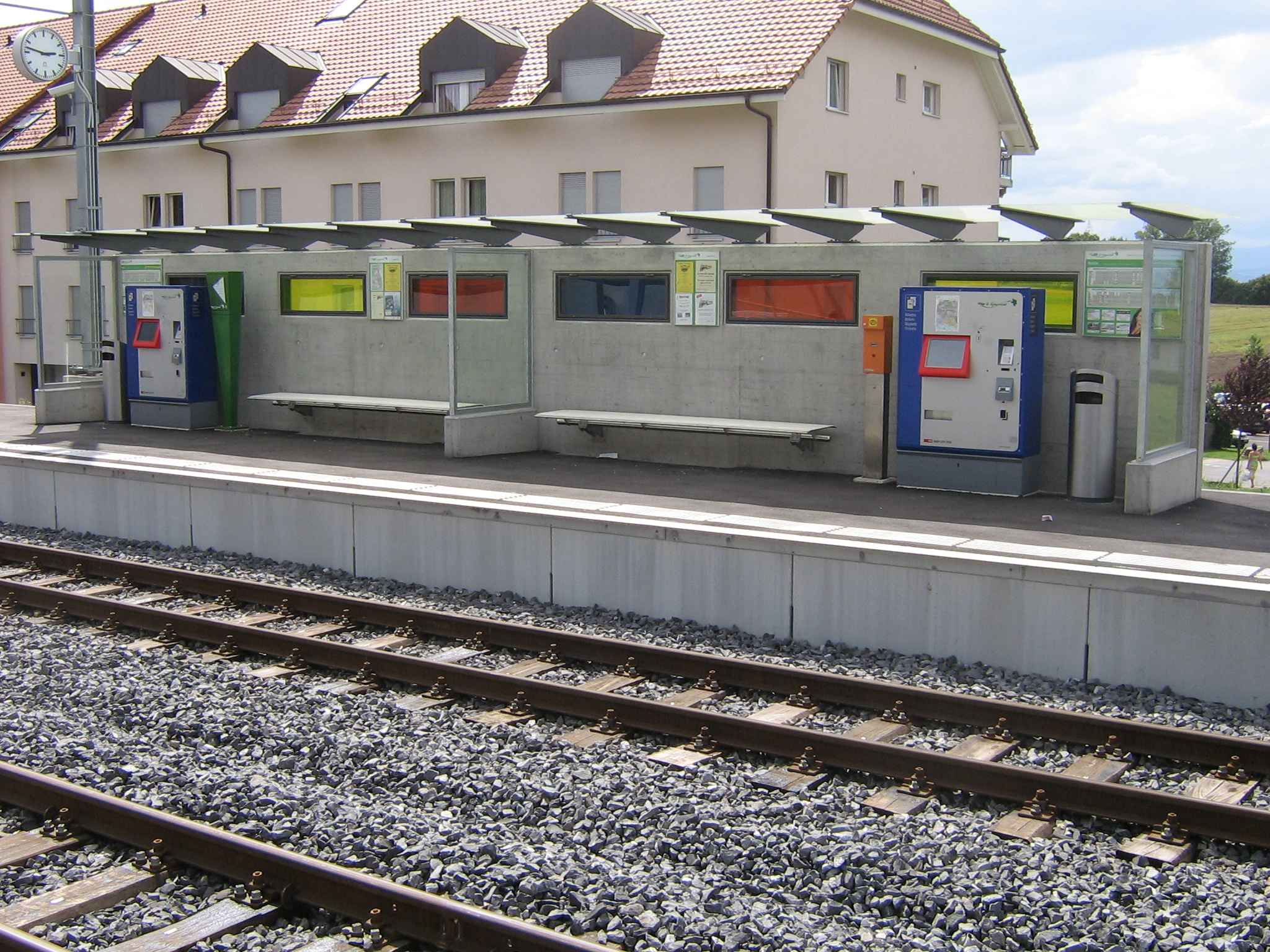
Shelter on platform to Lausanne

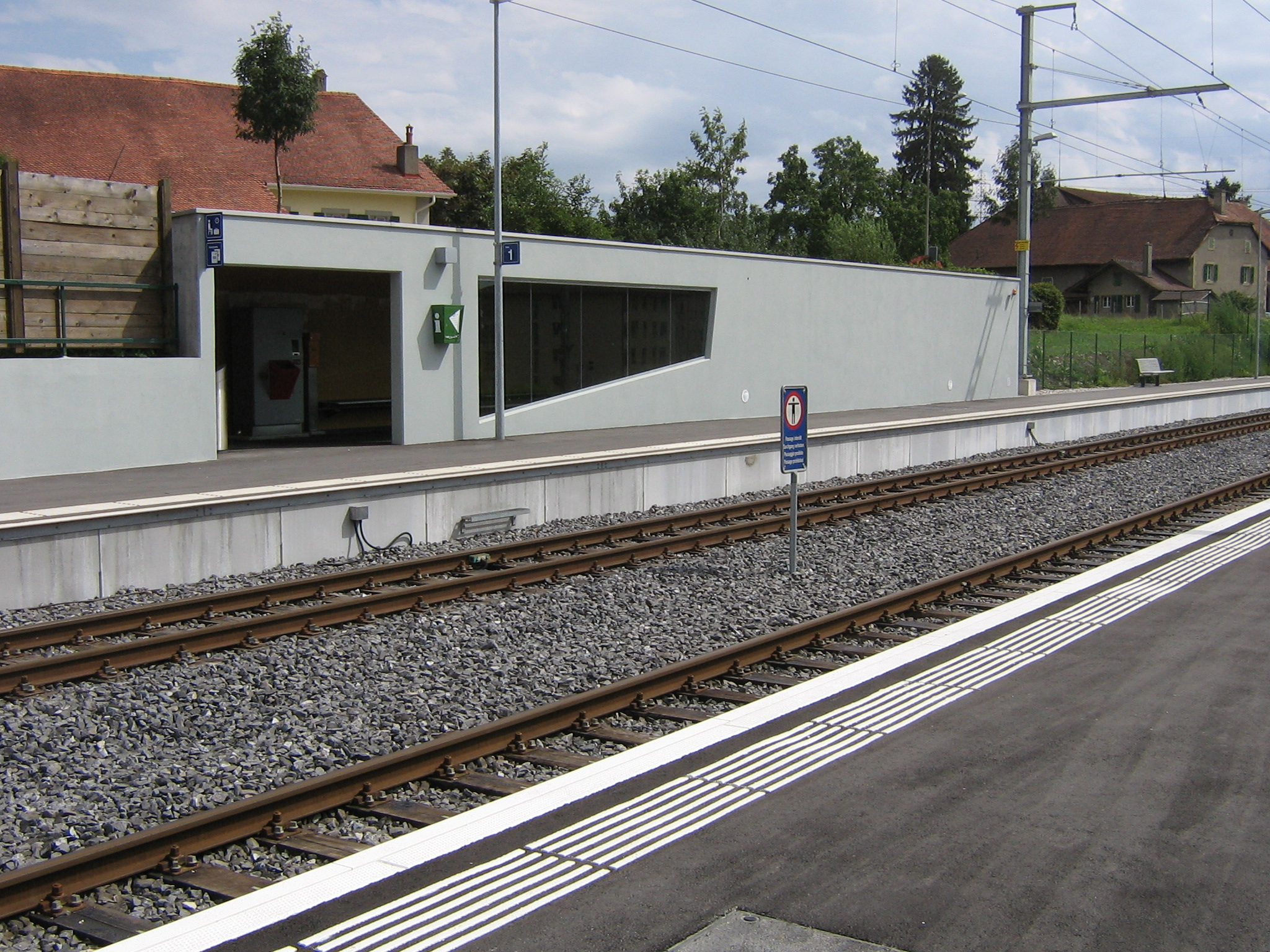
Shelter on platform to Échallens

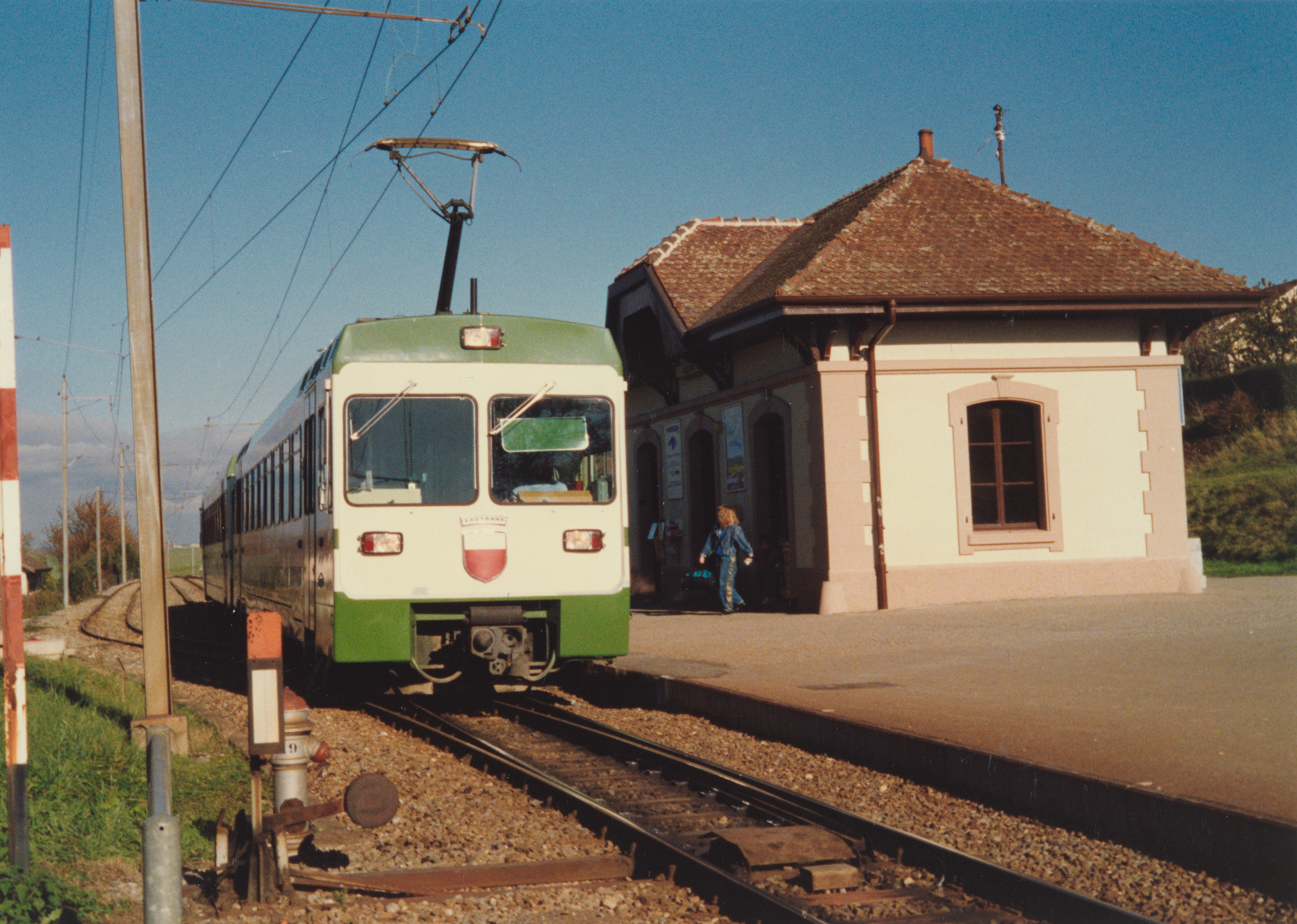
The station between 1985 and 1988
