= Romanel-sur-Lausanne =

- Municipality
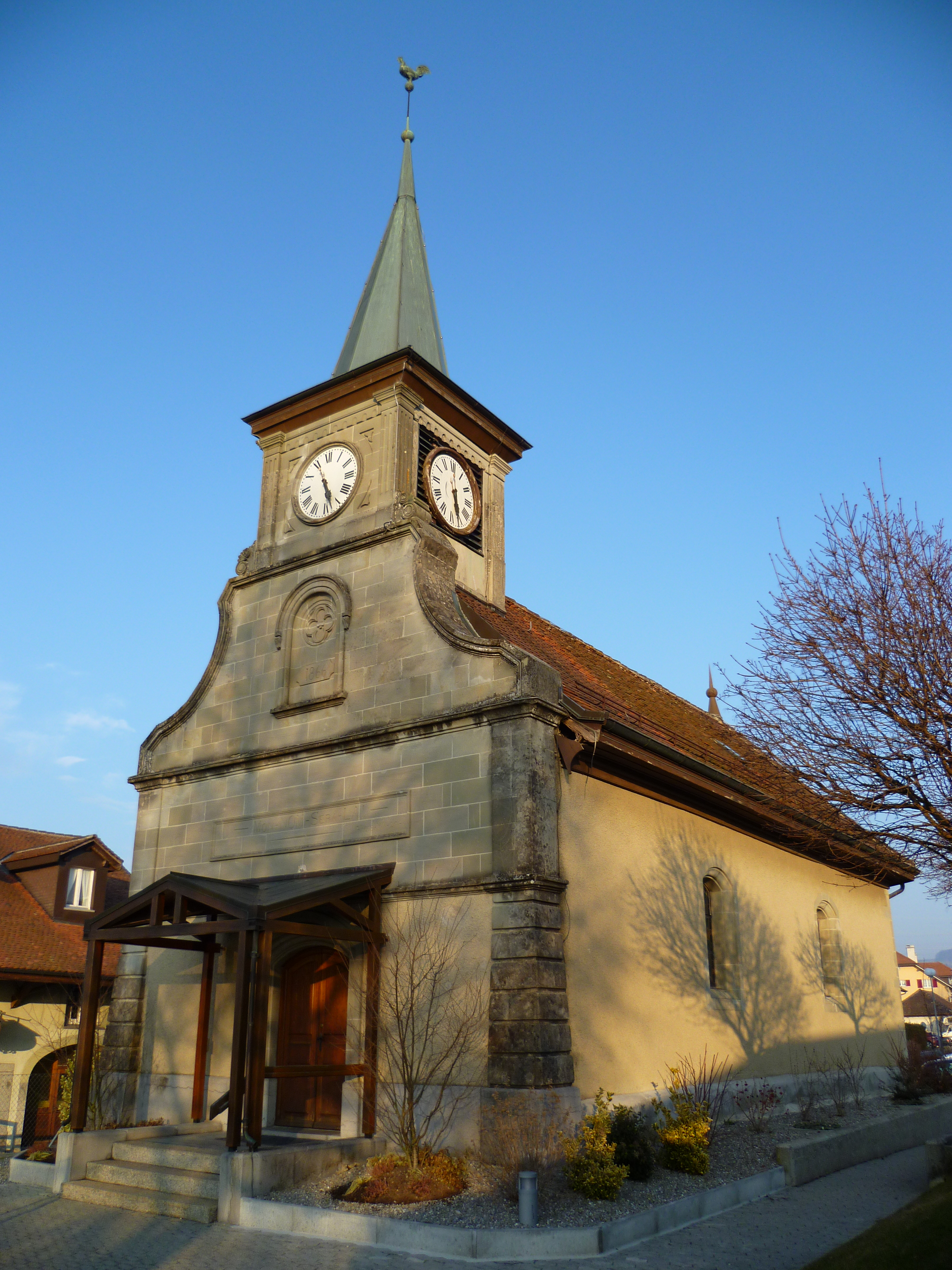
- Romanel-sur-Lausanne church

- Flag Coat of arms
- Location of Romanel-sur-Lausanne
- Location within Switzerland Location within Canton of Vaud
- Coordinates: 46°34′N 06°36′E
- Country: Switzerland
- Canton: Vaud
- District: Lausanne

Government
  - Mayor: Syndic; Claudia Perrin

Area
  - Total: 2.92 km^{2} (1.13 sq mi)
- Elevation: 592 m (1,942 ft)

Population (2003)
  - Total: 3,110
  - Density: 1,070/km^{2} (2,760/sq mi)
- Time zone: UTC+01:00 (CET)
  - Summer (DST): UTC+02:00 (CEST)
- Postal code: 1032
- SFOS number: 5592
- ISO 3166 code: CH-VD
- Surrounded by: Jouxtens-Mézery, Le Mont-sur-Lausanne, Lausanne, Prilly
- Website: www.romanel-sur-lausanne.ch

Romanel-sur-Lausanne (French pronunciation: [ʁɔmanɛl syʁ lɔzan], literally Romanel on Lausanne; Arpitan: Romanél) is a municipality in the canton of Vaud in Switzerland. It is located in the district of Lausanne, and is a suburb of the city of Lausanne.

== History ==
Romanel-sur-Lausanne is first mentioned in 1184 as Romanes.

Romanel-sur-Lausanne was unaffected by the changes to the composition of the district of Lausanne on 31 August 2006, remaining part of that district.

== Geography ==
Aerial view (1964)

Romanel-sur-Lausanne is part of the agglomeration of the city of Lausanne. Until the 1960s, it consisted of a linear village on the Lausanne-Echallens road, which then grew to become part of the greater Lausanne area. It lies some 5 kilometres (3.1 mi) north-north-west of the centre of the city.

The municipality has an area, as of 2009, of 2.88–2.92 square kilometers (1.11–1.13 mi^{2}) (depending on calculation method). Of this area, 1.72 km^{2} (0.66 mi^{2}) or 59.7% is used for agricultural purposes, while 0.11 km^{2} (0.042 mi^{2}) or 3.8% is forested. Of the rest of the land, 1.09 km^{2} (0.42 mi^{2}) or 37.8% is settled (buildings or roads).

Of the built up area, industrial buildings made up 5.2% of the total area while housing and buildings made up 14.2% and transportation infrastructure made up 12.5%. Power and water infrastructure as well as other special developed areas made up 3.1% of the area while parks, green belts and sports fields made up 2.8%. Out of the forested land, 1.7% of the total land area is heavily forested and 2.1% is covered with orchards or small clusters of trees. Of the agricultural land, 55.6% is used for growing crops and 1.4% is pastures, while 2.8% is used for orchards or vine crops.

== Government ==
=== Politics ===
In the 2007 federal election the most popular party was the SVP which received 22.9% of the vote. The next three most popular parties were the SP (22.79%), the Green Party (16.6%) and the FDP (15.34%). In the federal election, a total of 904 votes were cast, and the voter turnout was 45.0%.

=== Coat of arms ===
The blazon of the municipal coat of arms is Gules, a Fountain Gules and Argent fimbriated Argent, Chief of the same.

== Demographics ==
Romanel-sur-Lausanne has a population (as of December 2020) of 3,240. As of 2008, 19.4% of the population are resident foreign nationals. Over the last 10 years (1999–2009 ) the population has changed at a rate of 5.9%. It has changed at a rate of -1.3% due to migration and at a rate of 7.8% due to births and deaths.

Most of the population (as of 2000) speaks French (2,737 or 89.2%), with German being second most common (128 or 4.2%) and Italian being third (66 or 2.2%). There is 1 person who speaks Romansh.

Of the population in the municipality 605 or about 19.7% were born in Romanel-sur-Lausanne and lived there in 2000. There were 1,276 or 41.6% who were born in the same canton, while 572 or 18.6% were born somewhere else in Switzerland, and 549 or 17.9% were born outside of Switzerland.

In 2008 there were 32 live births to Swiss citizens and 5 births to non-Swiss citizens, and in same time span there were 14 deaths of Swiss citizens and 2 non-Swiss citizen deaths. Ignoring immigration and emigration, the population of Swiss citizens increased by 18 while the foreign population increased by 3. There was 1 Swiss man who emigrated from Switzerland and 2 Swiss women who immigrated back to Switzerland. At the same time, there were 19 non-Swiss men and 14 non-Swiss women who immigrated from another country to Switzerland. The total Swiss population change in 2008 (from all sources, including moves across municipal borders) was a decrease of 25 and the non-Swiss population increased by 21 people. This represents a population growth rate of -0.1%.

The age distribution, as of 2009, in Romanel-sur-Lausanne is; 346 children or 10.6% of the population are between 0 and 9 years old and 392 teenagers or 12.0% are between 10 and 19. Of the adult population, 476 people or 14.6% of the population are between 20 and 29 years old. 506 people or 15.5% are between 30 and 39, 512 people or 15.7% are between 40 and 49, and 409 people or 12.6% are between 50 and 59. The senior population distribution is 371 people or 11.4% of the population are between 60 and 69 years old, 148 people or 4.5% are between 70 and 79, there are 84 people or 2.6% who are between 80 and 89, and there are 14 people or 0.4% who are 90 and older.

As of 2000, there were 1,295 people who were single and never married in the municipality. There were 1,503 married individuals, 92 widows or widowers and 178 individuals who are divorced.

As of 2000, there were 1,258 private households in the municipality, and an average of 2.4 persons per household. There were 367 households that consist of only one person and 63 households with five or more people. Out of a total of 1,272 households that answered this question, 28.9% were households made up of just one person and there were 6 adults who lived with their parents. Of the rest of the households, there are 331 married couples without children, 459 married couples with children There were 77 single parents with a child or children. There were 18 households that were made up of unrelated people and 14 households that were made up of some sort of institution or another collective housing.

In 2000 there were 142 single family homes (or 47.3% of the total) out of a total of 300 inhabited buildings. There were 96 multi-family buildings (32.0%), along with 37 multi-purpose buildings that were mostly used for housing (12.3%) and 25 other use buildings (commercial or industrial) that also had some housing (8.3%). Of the single family homes 11 were built before 1919, while 13 were built between 1990 and 2000. The greatest number of single family homes (63) were built between 1981 and 1990. The most multi-family homes (32) were built between 1971 and 1980 and the next most (22) were built between 1961 and 1970. There were 4 multi-family houses built between 1996 and 2000.

In 2000 there were 1,316 apartments in the municipality. The most common apartment size was 3 rooms of which there were 444. There were 54 single room apartments and 268 apartments with five or more rooms. Of these apartments, a total of 1,254 apartments (95.3% of the total) were permanently occupied, while 45 apartments (3.4%) were seasonally occupied and 17 apartments (1.3%) were empty. As of 2009, the construction rate of new housing units was 0.3 new units per 1000 residents. The vacancy rate for the municipality, in 2010, was 0%.

The historical population is given in the following chart:

== Economy ==
As of 2010, Romanel-sur-Lausanne had an unemployment rate of 4.3%. As of 2008, there were 13 people employed in the primary economic sector and about 5 businesses involved in this sector. 325 people were employed in the secondary sector and there were 33 businesses in this sector. 714 people were employed in the tertiary sector, with 94 businesses in this sector. There were 1,715 residents of the municipality who were employed in some capacity, of which females made up 44.6% of the workforce.

In 2008 the total number of full-time equivalent jobs was 924. The number of jobs in the primary sector was 12, of which 5 were in agriculture and 7 were in forestry or lumber production. The number of jobs in the secondary sector was 308 of which 214 or (69.5%) were in manufacturing and 88 (28.6%) were in construction. The number of jobs in the tertiary sector was 604. In the tertiary sector; 322 or 53.3% were in wholesale or retail sales or the repair of motor vehicles, 4 or 0.7% were in the movement and storage of goods, 58 or 9.6% were in a hotel or restaurant, 45 or 7.5% were in the information industry, 23 or 3.8% were technical professionals or scientists, 27 or 4.5% were in education and 15 or 2.5% were in health care.

In 2000, there were 1,020 workers who commuted into the municipality and 1,413 workers who commuted away. The municipality is a net exporter of workers, with about 1.4 workers leaving the municipality for every one entering. About 2.1% of the workforce coming into Romanel-sur-Lausanne are coming from outside Switzerland. Of the working population, 19.2% used public transportation to get to work, and 65.2% used a private car.

== Transport ==
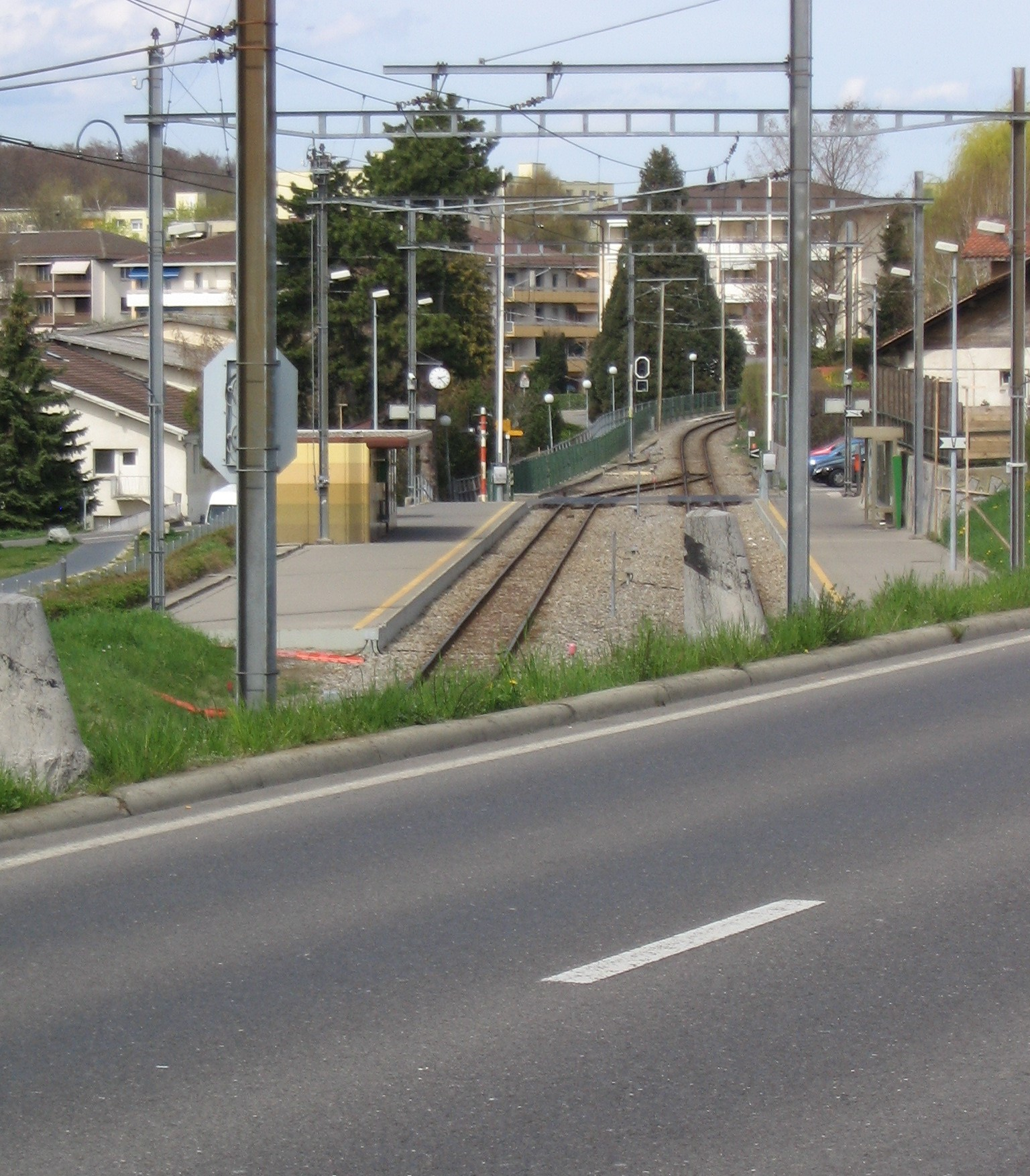
The railway station, with the main road in the foreground

=== Railway ===
The municipality has a railway station, Romanel-sur-Lausanne, on the suburban Lausanne–Échallens–Bercher line. The station provides a service every fifteen minutes between Romanel-sur-Lausanne and Lausanne, and between Romanel-sur-Lausanne and Échallens, with every other train continuing from Échallens to Bercher.

=== Road ===
Romanel-sur-Lausanne is situated on the main road (route 5) that, prior to the construction of the Swiss motorway network, linked Lausanne with Échallens, Yverdon, Neuchâtel and points north. It is now located near the A1 and A9 motorways that provide links throughout, and beyond, Switzerland.

== Religion ==
From the 2000 census, 1,010 or 32.9% were Roman Catholic, while 1,370 or 44.7% belonged to the Swiss Reformed Church. Of the rest of the population, there were 35 members of an Orthodox church (or about 1.14% of the population), there were 7 individuals (or about 0.23% of the population) who belonged to the Christian Catholic Church, and there were 237 individuals (or about 7.72% of the population) who belonged to another Christian church. There were 4 individuals (or about 0.13% of the population) who were Jewish, and 26 (or about 0.85% of the population) who were Islamic. There were 8 individuals who were Buddhist, 12 individuals who were Hindu and 3 individuals who belonged to another church. 370 (or about 12.06% of the population) belonged to no church, are agnostic or atheist, and 97 individuals (or about 3.16% of the population) did not answer the question.

== Education ==
In Romanel-sur-Lausanne about 1,289 or (42.0%) of the population have completed non-mandatory upper secondary education, and 390 or (12.7%) have completed additional higher education (either university or a Fachhochschule). Of the 390 who completed tertiary schooling, 58.7% were Swiss men, 25.9% were Swiss women, 11.8% were non-Swiss men and 3.6% were non-Swiss women.

In the 2009/2010 school year there were a total of 417 students in the Romanel-sur-Lausanne school district. In the Vaud cantonal school system, two years of non-obligatory pre-school are provided by the political districts. During the school year, the political district provided pre-school care for a total of 2,648 children of which 1,947 children (73.5%) received subsidized pre-school care. The canton's primary school program requires students to attend for four years. There were 241 students in the municipal primary school program. The obligatory lower secondary school program lasts for six years and there were 170 students in those schools. There were also 6 students who were home schooled or attended another non-traditional school.

As of 2000, there were 47 students in Romanel-sur-Lausanne who came from another municipality, while 345 residents attended schools outside the municipality.
