= Flon =

Flon or Le Flon may refer to:

- Suzanne Flon (1918–2005), French film actress and comedian
- Le Flon, a municipality in the canton of Fribourg in Switzerland
- Le Flon (Lausanne), an area of the city of Lausanne, Switzerland
- Flon, Sweden, a village located in Härjedalen, Sweden

== See also ==
- F'lon, one of the characters in Dragonriders of Pern, a science fiction series by Anne McCaffrey
