= Lausanne tramway =

Modern tram line in Lausanne, Switzerland

Lausanne tramway line T1

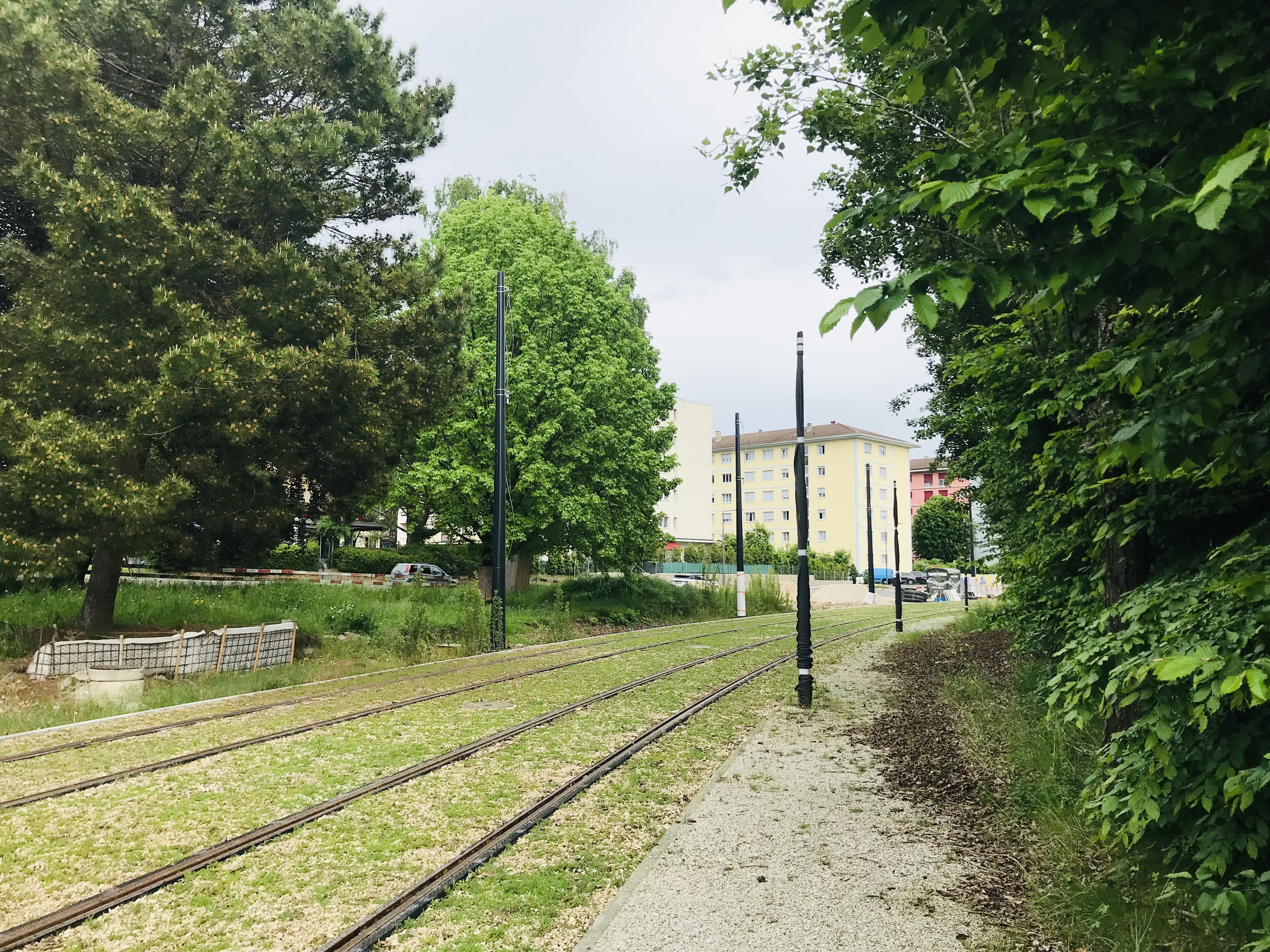
- Construction of the tram line in Renens

Overview
- Locale: Vaud, Switzerland
- Termini: Lausanne-Flon station; Renens railway station (phase 1) Croix-Péage (phase 2)
- Stations: 10 (phase 1) +6 (phase 2)
- Website: https://tramway-lausannois.ch/

Service
- Type: Tramway
- Operator: Transports publics de la région lausannoise

History
- Planned opening: Phase 1: 13 December 2026; Phase 2: 2027

Technical
- Line length: 4.6 km (2.9 mi) (phase 1); 3.4 km (2.1 mi) (phase 2)
- Track gauge: 1,435 mm (4 ft 8 1/2 in) standard gauge
- Electrification: 750 V DC Overhead catenary

The Lausanne tramway (French: tramway lausannois or French: tramway de Lausanne) is a second generation tramway. Line T1 of the Lausanne tramway will link Lausanne-Flon, in the centre of Lausanne, to Renens, to the west of the agglomeration. Its opening is scheduled for 13 December 2026 will mark the return of trams (streetcars as opposed to light rail) after the former tram system closed in 1964, over 60 years prior. The tramway was designated as line T1 in its planning stage, but will become line 5 when it opens to the public.

Line T1 is part of the Projet d’Agglomération Lausanne-Morges (PALM), a project that also includes a third metro line between Lausanne-Gare and Blécherette, three BRT lines, the development of RER Vaud and CFF lines, and the modernization of the Lausanne–Échallens–Bercher line.

== Stations ==
The following table lists tram stations from east to west, including stations for phase 2:

Station	Coordinates	Commune (district)	Connections
Phase 1
Lausanne-Flon	46°31′15″N 6°37′49″E	Lausanne (Centre)	Lausanne–Échallens–Bercher line; Metro lines M1 & M2; buses of TL.
Port-Franc	46°31′20″N 6°37′38″E	Lausanne (Centre)	
EPSIC	46°31′24″N 6°37′15″E	Lausanne (Centre)	
École des Métiers	46°31′29″N 6°36′53″E	Lausanne (Sébeillon/Malley)	
Prélaz-les-Roses	46°31′36″N 6°36′29″E	Lausanne (Sébeillon/Malley)	BRT transfer hub
Galicien	46°31′43″N 6°36′11″E	Prilly	BRT transfer hub; CFF (Gare de Prilly-Malley)
Perrelet	46°31′49″N 6°35′52″E	Renens	
Croisée/Tilleuls	46°32′01″N 6°35′26″E	Renens	
Hôtel-de-Ville/ECAL	46°32′10″N 6°35′09″E	Renens (Centre)	
Renens-Gare	46°32′16″N 6°34′45″E	Renens (Centre)	RER Vaud; CFF; Metro line M1
Phase 2
Pont-Bleu	46°32′23″N 6°34′32″E	Crissier	
Vernie	46°32′38″N 6°34′13″E	Crissier	
Arc-en-Ciel	46°32′51″N 6°33′52″E	Bussigny	
Buyère	46°33′00″N 6°33′49″E	Bussigny	BRT transfer hub
Condémine	46°33′17″N 6°33′43″E	Bussigny	
Croix-Péage	46°33′39″N 6°33′55″E	Villars-Sainte-Croix	

== History ==
The modern tramway was outlined as early as 2004 and then submitted to the Confederation in 2007 as part of the agglomeration project. In 2012, there was a public inquiry to construct the new tramway along Rue de Genève as well as the construction of the Rampe Vigie-Gonin, a road project to compensate for the closure of two roads. The rampe would have taken space from La forêt du Flon, a wooded area that environmentalists wanted to preserve.

In August 2021, construction officially started after nine years of procedural delays to address criticisms of the project. One of the delays was over whether La forêt du Flon could be kept intact while constructing the tramway, which was possible. Another delay was over the construction of the Rampe Vigie-Gonin, which had been cancelled by 2019.

The first Stadler tram was delivered to the new tram depot on 2 March 2026. Since then 36 tram drivers had been trained. On 4 October 2026, TL started a six-week, full-scale tests of the system (marches à blanc). Trams would run on various schedules from morning to evening to simulate normal operating conditions but without passengers.

By the fall of 2026, line T1 had been renumbered as line 5. By November, a public inauguration would be scheduled for 5 December with a parade, ceremonies and free rides from 13:00 to 17:00. The scheduled opening date would be one week later on 13 December.

== Description ==
Testruns of the tram in Renens

Line 5 (formerly line T1 in the planning stages) is being built in two phases: Phase 1 runs 4.6 km (2.9 mi) between Lausanne-Flon and Renens railway stations and is expected to open in late 2026. Phase 2 extends the line by 3.4 km (2.1 mi) from Renens station to Croix-Péage in Villars-Sainte-Croix, and is expected to open in 2027.

Phase 1 of line 5 runs roughly in an east–west direction from Lausanne-Flon to Renens stations roughly paralleling the railway line between the two stations on the north side of the railway line. From Lausanne-Flon, the line runs along the streets: Rue de Genève, Avenue de Morges, Route de Renens and Rue de Lausanne before arriving on the north side of Renens train station. Between the tram stops Flon and Port-Franc, the line runs in mixed traffic. Between Port-Franc and Galicien, the line runs in a central reservation on the street. Between Galicien and half way to Renen-Gare, the line runs on the side of the road. Approaching Renens-Gare, the line again runs in mixed traffic. The 10 stations for phase 1 are spaced approximately 500 metres (1,600 ft) apart.

Phase 2 extends the line from Renens-Gare curving north to Croix-Péage in Villars-Sainte-Croix. From Renens-Gare, the line will follow the streets Rue du Terminus, Route de Bussigny, Boulevard de l’Arc-en-Ciel, Route de Crissier, Route de Bruyères and Route de Sullens arriving at the Croix-Péage terminus near Route 9. From Renens-Gare to just beyond Pont-Bleu the line will be in mixed traffic, then in a centre-of-road reservation to mid-way between Arc-en-Ciel and Buyère and then on the side of the road to Croix-Péage. Between Bernie and Croix-Péage, the line will be on a green right-of-way.

The line will have seven sub-stations. Line 5 is the first tramline in Switzerland to use standard gauge tracks, the others using metric gauge.

At tram stations, boarding platforms will be 40 metres (130 ft) long and level with the tram floor for accessibility. With the exception of Renens-Gare, the same design will be used for all tram stations.

The planned trip time will be 15 minutes between Lausanne-Flon and Renens-Gare, and 24 minutes between Lausanne-Flon and Croix-du-Péage. The frequency between trams is expected to be every 6 minutes. The annual ridership is expected to be 18 million by 2030.

== Fleet ==
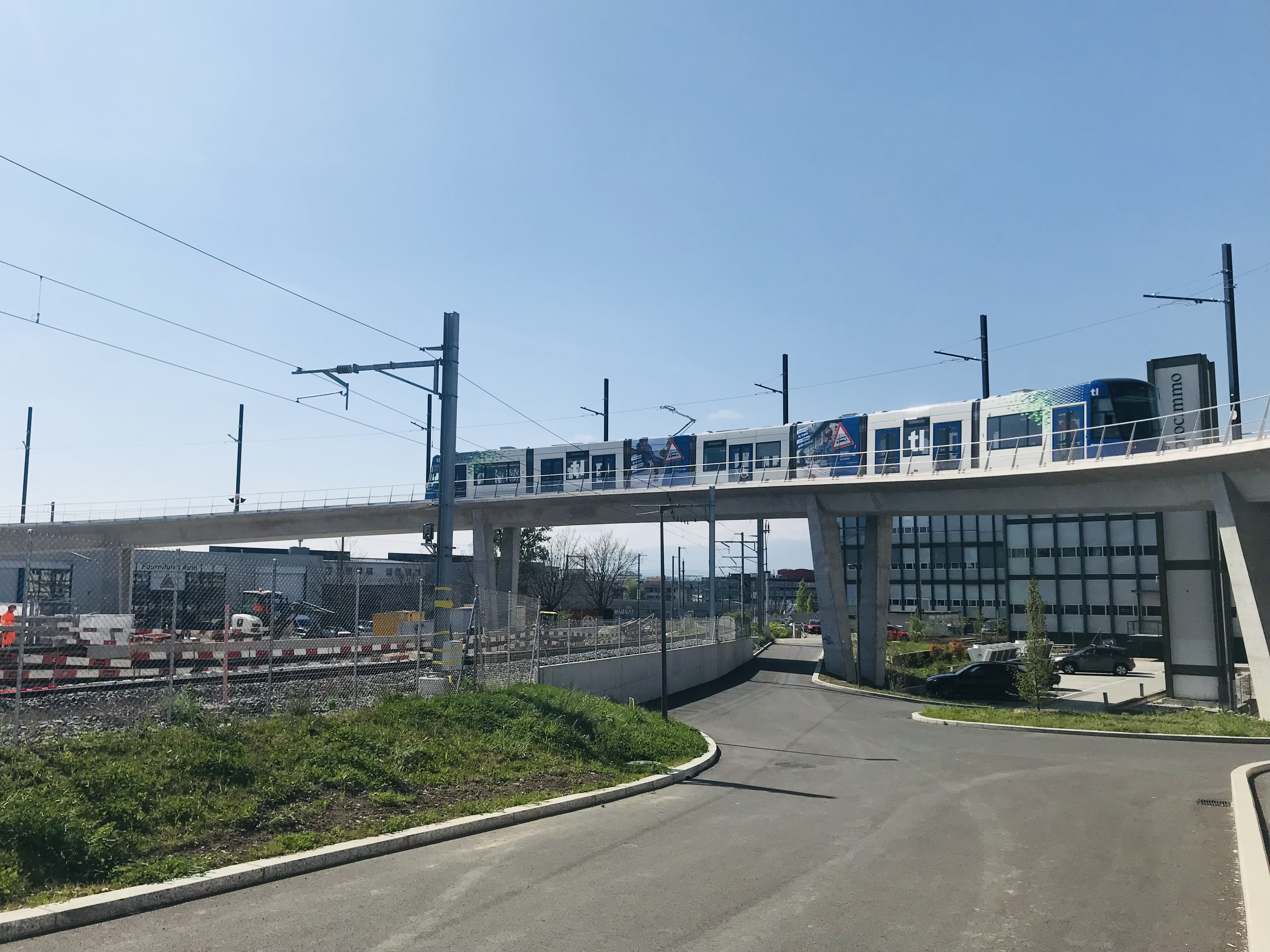
Stadler Tramlink tram on the bridge linking the depot to the mainline

The tram line will use 10 Stadler Tramlink trams which will run on standard gauge tracks. The seven-section, low-floor trams are 45 metres (148 ft) long and 2.650 metres (8 ft 8.3 in) wide, and have capacity for 316 passengers, 75 seated. The bidirectional trams have eight double-leaf door on each side with a system to fill the gap between the tram door and platform edge. Trams will operate at an average speed of 18 kilometres per hour (11 mph) versus 14 kilometres per hour (8.7 mph) for a standard trolleybus. The trams were constructed in Valencia, Spain.

The tram depot (garage atelier du tramway) is located just west of the Perrelet stop, on the south side of the line. It is connected to the mainline by a single-track bridge (Pont du Closel) over the CFF's Sébeillon railway line. With 5,600 square metres (60,000 sq ft) of surface area, the depot building can accommodate up to 15 trams. The building's basement has an area of 800 square metres (8,600 sq ft), and its roof has photovoltaic panels, green spaces and access to bring light and natural ventilation into the hall.

== See also ==
- Trams in Lausanne - the first generation tramway network
- Lausanne Metro
- Lausanne–Bercher line
