= Le Flon (Lausanne) =

Coordinates: 46°31′18″N 6°37′37″E

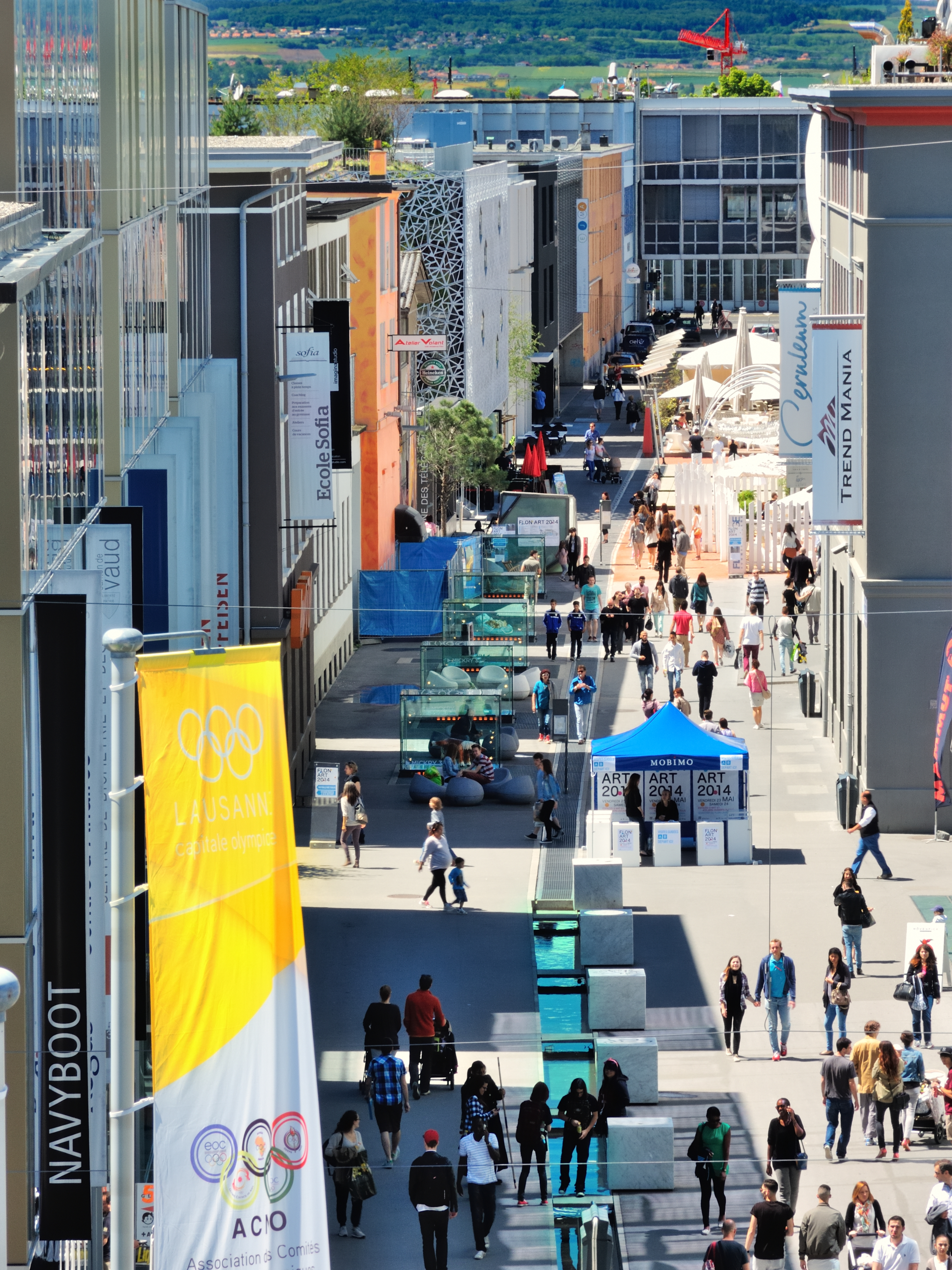
The Voie du Chariot with the fountain symbolising the Flon river

Le Flon is a district of the city of Lausanne, in Switzerland. It is served by Lausanne Metro Lines M1 and M2 from Lausanne-Flon station.

== Location ==
This area is in the bowl of a valley that has been filled. A river, also named Flon, once flowed through this valley and now runs underground. The area is situated in the central neighborhood of Lausanne.

== History ==
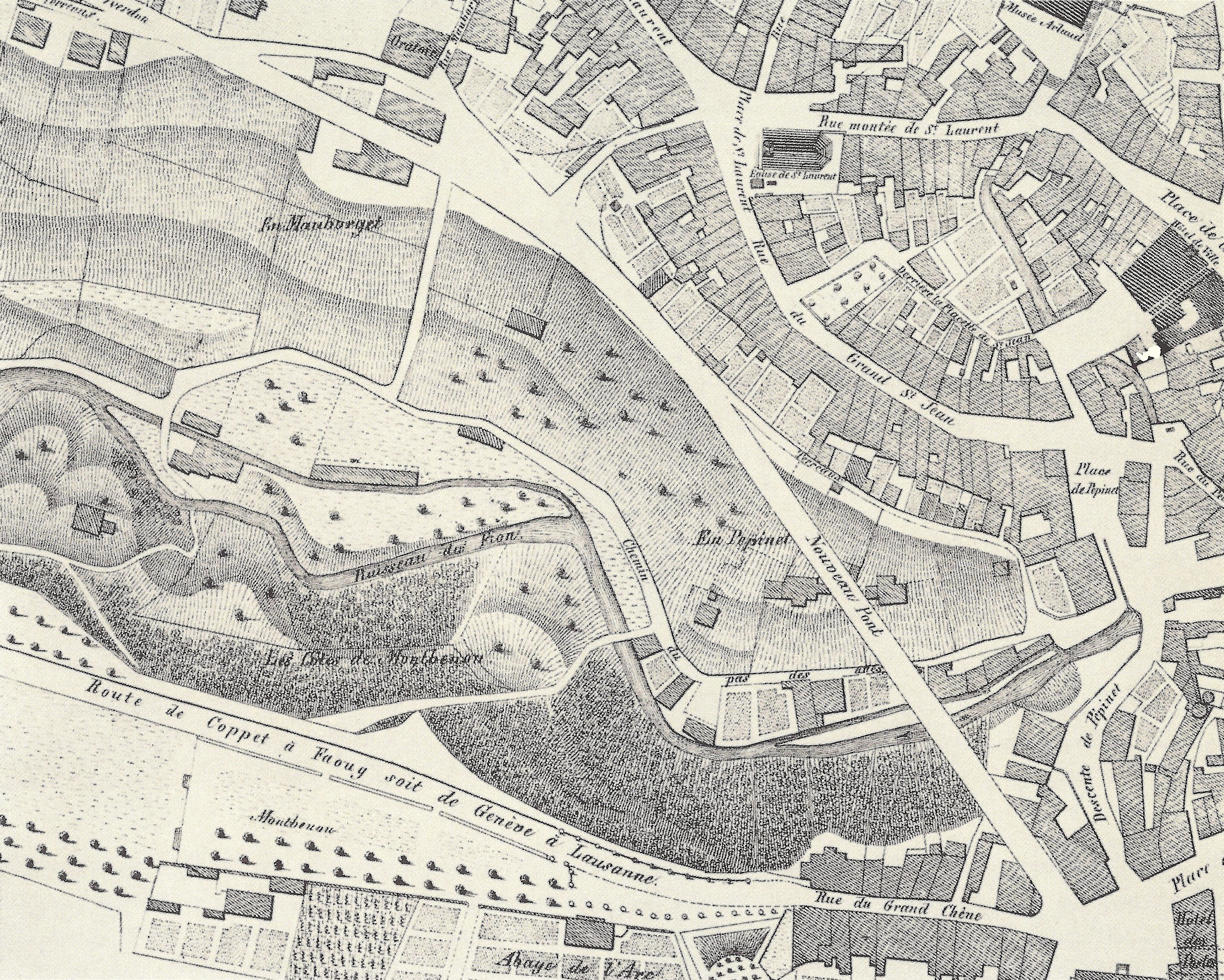
The Flon valley in 1853. To the west of the Grand Pont (Nouveau Pont) is open countryside, and the Flon river is still uncovered.

The Flon was once a wooded and uninhabited valley. The early industrial development in the nineteenth century saw new mills, tanneries and fullers occupy the Flon valley, accompanied by a bad reputation due to the activity of leather work, which brought unpleasant smells, forcing Lausanne inhabitants to avoid the place.

On March 12, 1874, the Compagnie du Chemin de fer Lausanne-Ouchy (which later became the Group Lausanne-Ouchy SA) was founded to provide transport for people and goods between the port of Ouchy, the station of the then Jura-Simplon line, and the Place Saint-François. The Company became the owner of the valley in exchange for supporting all the costs of the work that was planned and which began the following June.

Tunnels were dug between Lausanne and Ouchy, and the excavated soil was used to backfill the Flon, downstream of the Grand Pont (Great Bridge). This major undertaking lasted until the end of World War II, giving the area during 40 years the looks of a wasteland to what was a once green valley.

In the early twentieth century, the Flon had become the main freight station of the city of Lausanne. However, from 1950 the site was connected to the rest of the city that extended around the ancient valley, removing the reason to be of the Gare du Flon. A period started during which the site deteriorated and some warehouses were transformed into low rent offices. The nightclub MAD opened in the 1980s.

In 1991, Line M1 of the Lausanne Metro opened, with its central terminus located at Lausanne-Flon, to give interchange with the Métro Lausanne–Ouchy and LEB commuter trains to Échallens and Bercher.

Up until the early 1990s, The Flon was considered a bad area of Lausanne. The Group Lausanne-Ouchy SA decided to start major work in accordance with their Plan partiel d'affectation which was divided into two parts (Flon Flon vision 1 and vision 2). In June 1999 the Municipal Council adopted the Lausanne PPP. The extensive work helped rehabilitate Le Flon, particularly with the opening of a seven-screen cinema complex along with a parking lot (which was given an award in 2003 by the European Parking Association Association), an English pub and a Thai restaurant.
