= Trams in Lausanne =

Coordinates: 46°56′51″N 7°26′26″E

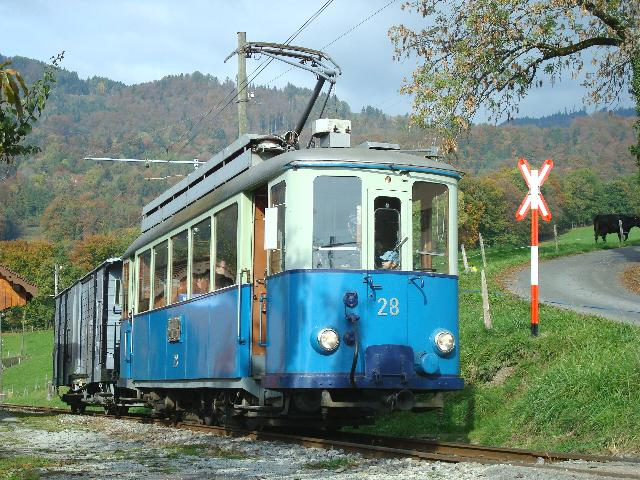
- Rolling stock 28 of the old tram preserved at the Blonay Chamby Railway

Overview
- Locale: Lausanne, Switzerland

Service
- Type: Tram
- Services: 6
- Operator(s): Lausanne Tramway Company (TL)

History
- Opened: Sep 1, 1896
- Closed: Jan 6, 1964

Technical
- Line length: 7.2 km (4.5 mi)
- Track gauge: 1,000 mm (3 ft 3 3/8 in) metre gauge
- Electrification: 550/600 V DC, overhead

Lausanne, a city in western Switzerland and a cultural and commercial centre, once had a standard steel wheeled tramway network. Opened in 1896, its heyday was during the 1930s. The tram service was completely stopped in 1964. Trams returned to Lausanne in 1991 as the light rail Lausanne Metro Line M1 and in 2026 as the Lausanne tramway.

== History ==
Unlike many cities of the world, the Lausanne tram system was started directly as electric tram.

The first attempts to create a tramway network in Lausanne date back to the period between 1869 and 1872, when a compressed air system was proposed comparable to that used on the Trams in Bern. In 1882, engineer Bergeron proposed the installation of a funicular traction tram (such as the famous San Francisco cable car system ) to connect the station to the city center, with a branch path; the death of the engineer put an end to the project.

On December 21, 1894, the engineer Adrien Palaz obtained the federal subsidy for the construction of a tram network, the following year he presented his project on the financial plan and obtained the support of the communal authorities. In August 1895, construction began on the power station to supply electricity to the grid, located between rue Saint-Martin and the medical school.

On June 5, 1895, the company that would operate the network was created: the Lausanne Tramway Company (TL), of which Adrien Palaz would be managing director and then director. The network, consisting of six lines and a total length of 7.2 km, was inaugurated on August 29, 1896, and was put into service on 1 September following. It consisted of a circular line around the city center using the "Ceintue Pichard" and five lines towards the suburbs and the train station in Saint-François:

- St. Francis - Georgette - Pully - Lutry (4.2 km );
- Saint-François - School of Medicine - Pont de Chailly (1.4 km );
- Saint-François - Riponne - Pontaise (1.1 km );
- Saint-François - CFF Station;
- Saint-François - LEB Station;
- Pichard Belt.

The network then began a large wave of expansion. In 1903, it consisted of ten lines including two suburban, for a total length of 23.287 km, including 5.690 km double track.

In 1898, the line between the CFF station, Saint-François, the tunnel and the hospital was opened, then the following year a line serving Chauderon, Monétan and Prilly opened, while the line of Pont de Chailly was extended to La Rosiaz. In 1902, the line of the hospital was extended to La Sallaz, and the following year, four lines were born:

- Station (Jura-Simplon) - Ouchy (1.9 km );
- Boulevard de Grancy - Court - Montoie (1.6 km );
- Chauderon - Renens Station (3.8 km );
- Station (Jura-Simplon) - Place de Chauderon (1.1 km ).

In 1906, two lines were born: Tunnel - Le Mont - Cugy (9.3 km ) and the "Tour de Ville" departing from the CFF station by Saint - François, Riponne and Chauderon. The line of Cugy was extended to Montheron the following year. In 1909, the railway station CFF - Riponne - Bel-Air - Bergières opened in turn.

On September 30, 1910, the Société des tramways de Lausanne absorbed the deficit of the Jorat regional electric railways (REJ), which operated the Jorat line that connected Lausanne to Moudon and Savigny, opened in 1902; the terminus of this line was occasionally moved downtown.

In 1912, the line Saint-François - Port Pully (3.1 km)

On October 28, 1913, the only fatal accident occurred in the history of the Lausanne tramway. The brakes of the motor # 67 failed in the descent of Valentin, on the very steep line of the Pontaise, and the convoy hit a house, causing two deaths and two wounded. The convoy was destroyed in the accident. A reorganization took place in the same year with the merger of lines 1 and 5 (line 1), 2 and 4 (line 2) and 9 and 11 (line 11).

In 1922 and 1932, the partial services Saint-François - Mousquines and Closelet-Épinettes were abolished. The network was fully renumbered in 1930 and a direct line Saint-François-Ouchy (4/14) was put into service.

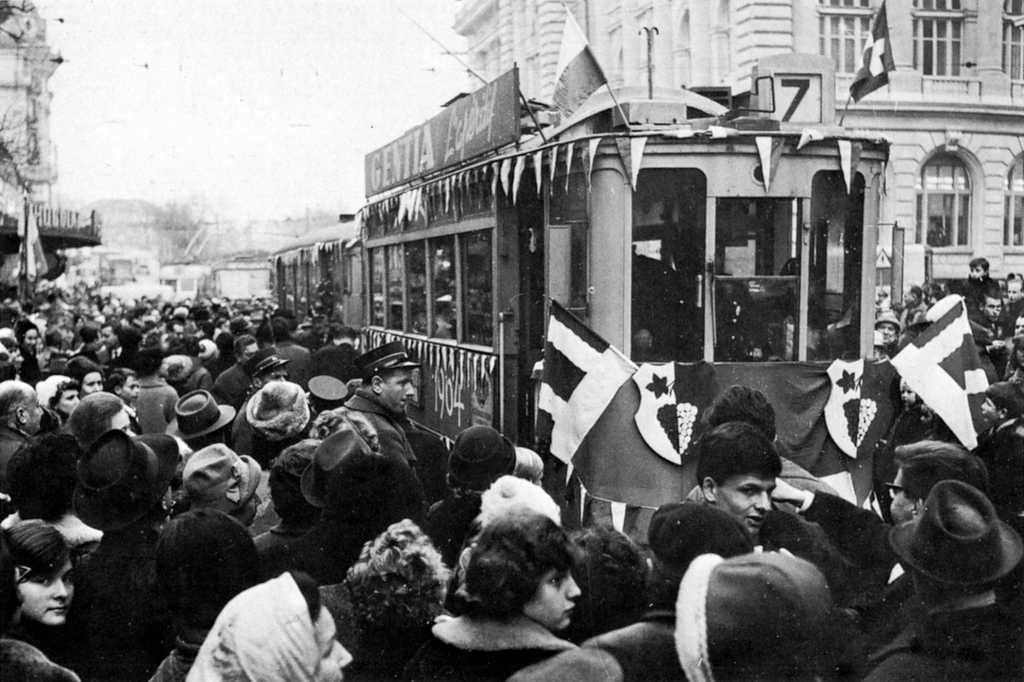
Last day of circulation of trams

Decline started before the 2nd World War. The network reached its peak in 1933 with 66.2 km of lines and two extensions: Caserne - Parc des Sports (1/11) and Saint-Jean - Bois de Vaux (2/12). But the decline of the network began the year before with the commissioning of a trolleybus line between Ouchy and Lausanne station instead of trams on a section of line 1/11. This line obtained satisfactory results and led the TL to begin the replacement of trams by trolleybuses in 1938, judged to be more adapted to the characteristic relief of the Vaudoise capital composed of steep and numerous slopes, more comfortable, faster and less expensive to manage. In 1938, lines 4/14 and 8/18 were converted into trolleybuses, followed in 1939 by the Épinettes-Parc des Sports section of line 1/11, lines 2/12, 6/16 and the Grand tour de ville, the line 3/13 then saw its remaining section integrated in line 7/17.

World War II interrupted this replacement, causing the trams to be reintroduced on certain lines because of tire shortages (between 1942 and 1946 on the city tour and the line of La Sallaz and between 1944 and 1945 on Sundays and holidays on the line of Pontaise), it resumed at the end of the conflict. Fermented in 1951 line 20 (Place Tunnel-Montheron) and in 1961 sections of St. Francis Prilly and Lutry lines 7 and 9. The line of the Jorat (lines 21 to 23) closed in 1962; 15 and the last line, Renens-Saint-François-Rosiaz composed of the remaining sections of lines 7 and 9, were closed on January 6, 1964, to allow road improvements for the 1964 Swiss National Exhibition. From July 1963, one year before the closing of the last line, the Society of the Lausanne streetcars changed its name and became the Transports publics de la région lausannoise, while retaining the acronym TL – a name it carried since then.

Trolleybus service was even started before closure of the tram network. It has been largely replaced by a network of trolleybuses.

After closing tram network in '60, people of Lausanne thought the only unfashioned obstacle of smooth city traveling was removed, and the city could move faster than before, but it proved false some years later. Uncontrolled increase of petrol vehicles like bus, taxicab, and motor vehicle started choking the streets of Lausanne. Where other big cities of Switzerland like Basel, Bern, Geneve, Zurich etc. maintained tram, and modernised which caused improvement of city transport, Lausanne suffered from many problems of developing countries, including pollution, traffic jam, increasing population, etc. Increasing population brought urbanization of Lausanne, bringing motor vehicles, which increased air & sound pollution, as well as traffic jams & smog. In 1970s, all these problems started, and by mid-1980s, inhabitants of Lausanne realized that non-control of motor vehicles & closure of trams was a great mistake. Although the trolleybus was a pollution free transportation, maintenance of that system was even higher than trams, because it ran on rubber tyres, which required frequent replacement.

A funicular railway, which was later converted to a rack railway, was not sufficient for such a big city like Lausanne, and especially the western Lausanne had very insufficient mass transport. Trolleybus could not cope with the crowds.

Many cities around the world like Tunis, Buenos Aires, Pyongyang, Istanbul, etc. also understood that mistake, and like them, Lausanne also planned for return of trams.

The transportation in western Lausanne was not sufficient. So, transport authority decided to construct it in western side of the main city in 1991, which is now known as M1. During the 2000s a new project, this time a classic tramway running in the middle of a road, is projected between the same stations as those served by the M1, but along the Lausanne - Geneva line. It will be launched in 2020.

=== Past ===
- 1896 – Electric tram started running from 29 August.
- 1933 – The maximum extension of the network.
- 1964 – The last tram ran on 6 January.
- 1991 – Tram returned as modern system.

== Tram routes ==
- 1/11: Central Station - Ouchy, old line 1, closed in 1933;
- 2/12: Bois de Vaux - Bergières, old line 2, closed in 1939;
- 3/13: Central Station - Saint François - Chauderon - Prilly, former line 3, absorbed by line 7 in 1938;
- 4/14: Saint François - Ouchy, opened during this renumbering, closed in 1938;
- 6/16: Central Station - La Sallaz, old line 6, closed in 1939;
- 7/17: Prilly - Central Station - Saint François - La Rosiaz, former line 7 merged in 1938 on line 3/13, closed between 1961 (Prilly-Saint François) and 1964 (Saint François-La Rosiaz);
- 8/18: Saint Francis - The port of Pully, former line 10, closed in 1938;
- 9/19: Lutry - Saint François - Renens, former line 11, closed between 1961 (Lutry-Saint François) and 1964 (Saint François-Renens);
- 20: Lausanne Tunnel - Cugy - Montheron (ex-line 12), closed in 1951;
- 21: Lausanne Tunnel - Chalet at Gobet (formerly REJ line), closed in 1962;
- 22: Lausanne Tunnel - Moudon (formerly REJ line), closed in 1962;
- 23: Lausanne Tunnel - In Marin - Savigny (former line of REJ), closed in 1962.

NB: In the case of double route numbering (e.g. 7/17) the second was used for the reverse trip.

Until 1912, each line was identified by a symbol, as an anchor for that of Ouchy. From this date, they were numbered: 1 for Ouchy, 2 for Montjoie, 3 for Prilly, 4 for Bergières, 5 for Pontaise, 6 for La Sallaz, 7 for La Rosiaz, 8 for the City Tour, 9 for Lutry, 10 for Pully and 11 for Renens. From 1913, the lines of Ouchy and Pontaise merged under the index 1, the lines of Montjoie and Bergières under the index 2 and those of Renens and Lutry merged under the index 11. The line to Cugy and Montheron, unnumbered became the 12th.

In June 1930, a double numbering system was set up on the urban lines 10. The first figure concerned the go (ex the 1) and the second the return (ex the 11).

== Fleet ==
=== Motor coaches ===
- Nos. 1 to 14: self-propelled vehicles delivered in 1896 by SIG CIE
- Nos. 15 to 18: self-propelled vehicles delivered in 1897 by SIG CIE
- Nos. 21 to 27: self-propelled vehicles delivered in 1899 by SIG CIE
- Nos. 28 to 29: Self propelled railcars delivered in 1913 by SWS SAAS
- Nos. 30 to 54: self propelled railcars delivered in 1896 by SWS ACEC
- Nos. 55 to 58: self-propelled cars delivered in 1902 by SWS MFO
- Nos. 60 to 68: self-propelled railcars delivered in 1911 by SWS ACEC
- Nos. 69 to 75: self-propelled tractors delivered in 1911 by SWS IEG
- Nos. 80 to 85: railcars built in 1925–27 by ACEC and TL
- No 86 to 89: self-propelled built in 1929 by BBC TL
- Nos. 90 to 92: self-propelled delivered in 1902 by SWS MFO
- Nos. 95 to 99: self-propelled cars built in 1929 by BBC TL
- No. 171 to 174: self-propelled built in 1929 by SWS BBC
- No 175 to 177: self-propelled built in 1935 by BBC TL
- No 181 to 182: self-propelled built in 1932 by BBC TL
- Nos. 191 to 193: motor railcars delivered in 1954 by ACMV / BBC

=== Trailers ===
- No. 101: axle trailer and open platforms,
- No. 102: axle trailer and open platforms, ex company TS (Geneva)
- No 103 to 104: axle trailers and open platforms, delivered in 1908 by SWS
- No. 105 to 107: axle trailers and open platforms, formerly powered 1 to 18
- Nos. 111 to 112: Axle trailers and closed platforms, formerly GV (Geneva), acquired in 1908
- No. 115 to 117: Axle trailers and closed platforms, built in 1924 by TL workshops
- No. 121 to 129: Axle trailers and closed platforms, built in 1931 by TL workshops
- No 131 to 134: axle trailers and closed platforms, former tramway company of Winterthur
- Nos. 135 to 138: axle trailers and closed platforms, formerly Biel trams, acquired in 1949
- Nos. 139 to 140: Axle trailers and closed platforms, formerly Biel trams, acquired in 1949
- No 141 to 143: trailers with axles and open platforms, e.g. self-propelled tractors Serpollet compagnie GV (Geneva),
- Nos. 144 to 149: trailers with axles and open platforms, ex VE (Geneva) then Jorat company,
- No. 150: Axle trailer and closed platforms, ex Vevey-Montreux-Chillon company,
- No 151 to 153: Axle trailers and closed platforms delivered in 1911 by SWS
- No. 154: Axle trailer and closed platforms, former TL 64
- No 155 to 160: Axle trailers and closed platforms, e.g. Vevey-Montreux-Chillon-Byron-Villeneuve electric tramway company,
- 161 to 163: bogie trailers and closed platforms, built in 1930 by TL workshops
- No. 164 to 165: bogie trailers and closed platforms, built in 1954 and 56 by TL workshops

=== Preserved material ===
- No. 28, Blonay-Chamby Railway
- No. 36, Blonay-Chamby Railway
- No. 191 and 192, Gmunden-Vorchdorf Railway (Austria)

These vehicles looked outdated compared to the new cars and buses that were then on the streets. That was one of the strong reasons of closure of the system.

== Depots and termini ==
Epinettes, Parc des Sports, Bois-de-Vaux, Bergières, Gare CFF, Prilly, Ouchy, Saint-François, La Sallaz, La Rosiaz, Port de Pully, Lutry, Tunnel, Montheron, Chalet-à-Gobet, Moudon, Savigny were some of the termini.

== Alignment ==
The network was meter gauge and, for the most part, single-track, very few sections are double-track, and are supplied with direct current at a voltage of 550-600 Volts. The average curve radius is 20–25 meters, the lowest was only 14 meters at Lutry, in a narrow 90° curve. The slopes were like the Lausanne relief – steep, with a maximum of 112.7‰ on the Riponne-Pontaise line. Most tram routes were on unreserved tracks and middle of the roads. Tramcars were caught in the traffic jams caused by the cars, and single track was the main obstacle for a hassle free service. The tracks were also outdated, noisy and not maintained mostly. Those were some strong reasons of closure of the system.

The metro system follows the previous tram route 21, 22 & 23 between Sallaz & Croisettes.

== See also ==
- Lausanne tramway - the second generation tramway
- Lausanne Metro Line M1 - a light rail line
- Lausanne Metro - Rapid transit

== Sources ==
- De Gasparo, Charles-Étienne; Vianin, Patrick (8 August 1990). "Où sont passés les tramways? Les Lausannois témoignent". Ingénieurs et architectes suisses (in French). 116 (17): 339–347. doi:10.5169/seals-77280.
