= Lausanne Metro Line M1 =

Light rail line in Lausanne, Switzerland

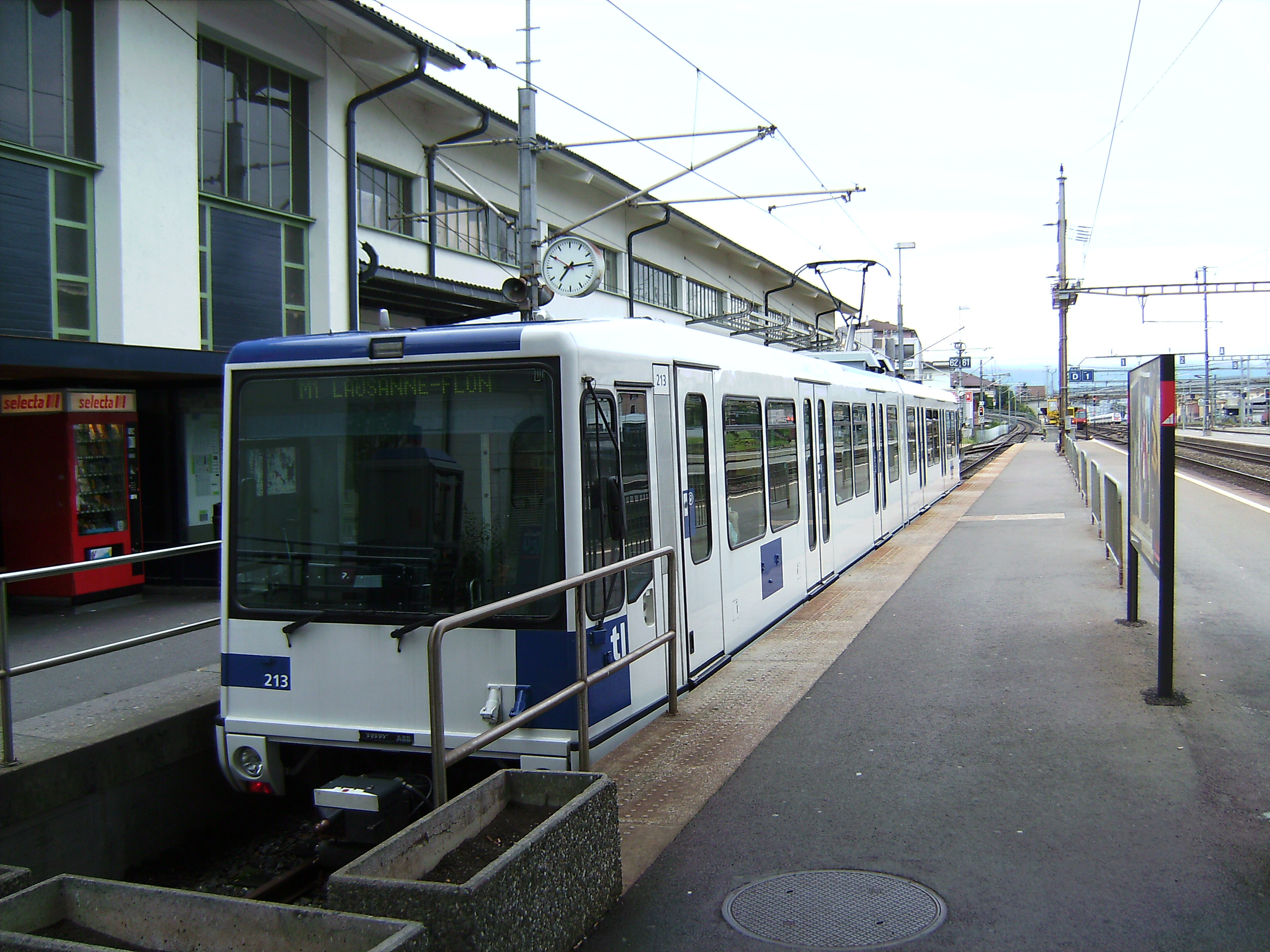
- Métro Line M1 standing at Renens terminus, adjacent to regional rail station

Overview
- Owner: TL
- Locale: Vaud, Switzerland
- Termini: Lausanne-Flon station; Renens railway station
- Stations: 15

Service
- Type: Light rail
- System: Lausanne Metro
- Operator: TL
- Rolling stock: TL Be 4/6 TL Bem 4/6
- Daily ridership: 43,500 (university term-time)
- Ridership: 13.2 million (2013)

History
- Opened: 2 June 1991; 35 years ago

Technical
- Line length: 7.8 km (4.8 mi)
- Num of tracks: 1 (some double track sections)
- Track gauge: 1,435 mm (4 ft 8 1/2 in) standard gauge
- Electrification: 750 V DC Overhead catenary
Lausanne Line M1

Lausanne Metro Line M1 is a light rail line which links Lausanne-Flon, in the centre of Lausanne, to Renens, to the west of the agglomeration. The line serves an important purpose as it goes through the Lausanne campus, making it a crucial transport method for students accessing their university. In 2013, its ridership was 13.2 million, making it the lesser-used line of the Lausanne Metro at this time.

The line opened in 1991 and was branded TSOL (Tramway du sud-ouest lausannois) until 2000 when it was rebranded to its current name to prepare the system for the second urban rail line.

== Route ==
The line operates between Lausanne-Flon and Renens VD, bypassing Lausanne railway station. It is 7.8 km (4.8 mi) long. At Lausanne-Flon, there are connections to the Lausanne–Bercher line (leb), Metro Line M2 and Buses of tl. At Renens, there are connections to regional trail services of RER Vaud and RegioExpress (RE) services of Swiss Federal Railways (CFF).

=== Stations ===
Station	Altitude (m)	Situation	Connections
Lausanne-Flon	479		Lausanne Metro Line M2 Lausanne–Echallens–Bercher railway
Vigie	481		
Montelly	443		
Provence	430		
Malley	422		
Bourdonnette	389		
UNIL-Chamberonne	388		
UNIL-Mouline	386		
UNIL-Sorge	391		
EPFL	397		
Bassenges	399		
Cerisaie	398		
Crochy	403		
Epenex	410		
Renens	404		R1 R2 R3 R4 R5 R6 RE33

== Fleet ==
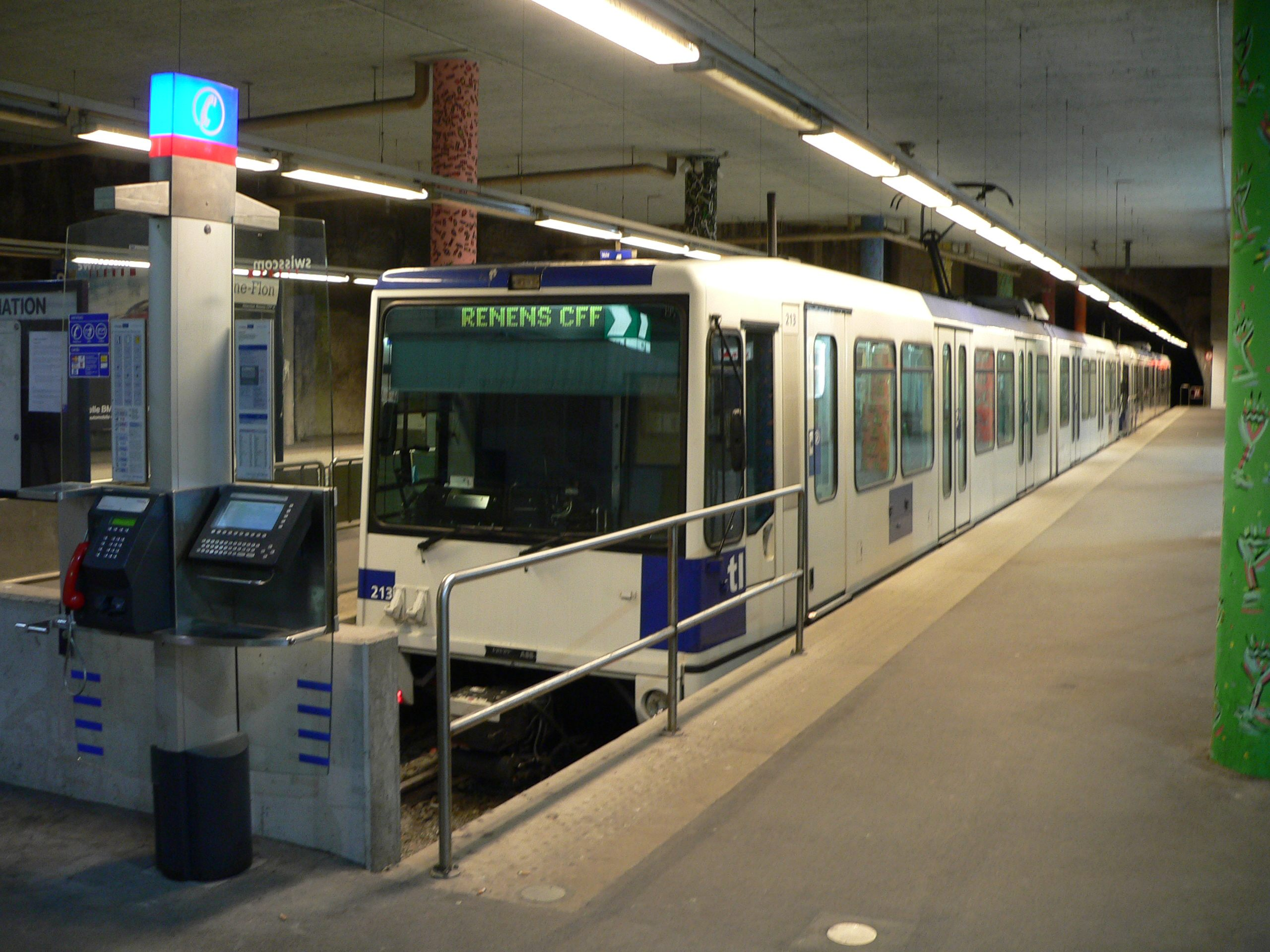
Train at Lausanne-Flon

To run the service, the line was equipped with a set of modern Light Rail Vehicles (LRVs), which run using electricity supplied via an overhead live wire and can be run singly or in multiple units, with each formation needing a driver.

There are a total of 18 of these original LRVs on the line, but after 20 years in service they were showing their age, and 2 were regularly out of use. Additionally, the line has been a victim of its own success, with 12.5 million passengers carried in 2012 and the line carrying the equivalent to the entire population of Yverdon-les-Bains every day.

In 2011, the Canton of Vaud gave 34 million Swiss Francs to enable the existing LRVs to have a mid-life refurbishment, and to permit the operator to commission MOB to build 5 brand-new LRVs. Previously, it was physically impossible for all trains to operate with a double formation, but the additional vehicles will enable the line to operate a full double-car service on all 10 peak-hour trains. In order to accommodate the new trains, the depot at Ecublens has been enlarged and additional servicing facilities built.

The first of the new LRVs was finished in July 2013 and was taken to the Ecublens depot in three distinct pieces: one half of the car body, the other half body, and the underframes and bogies. The operator was left to complete final assembly, and the new car entered service in December 2013. It is expected that the full fleet will be in service by 2015, permitting a 5-minute interval service of double-length trains.

All vehicles are high floor and capable of high speed operation. Each vehicle is formed of two cars, and in peak hours, two vehicles are coupled for increased capacity. The LRVs are electric and are equipped with one pantograph and feature air conditioned driving cabs.

== Features ==
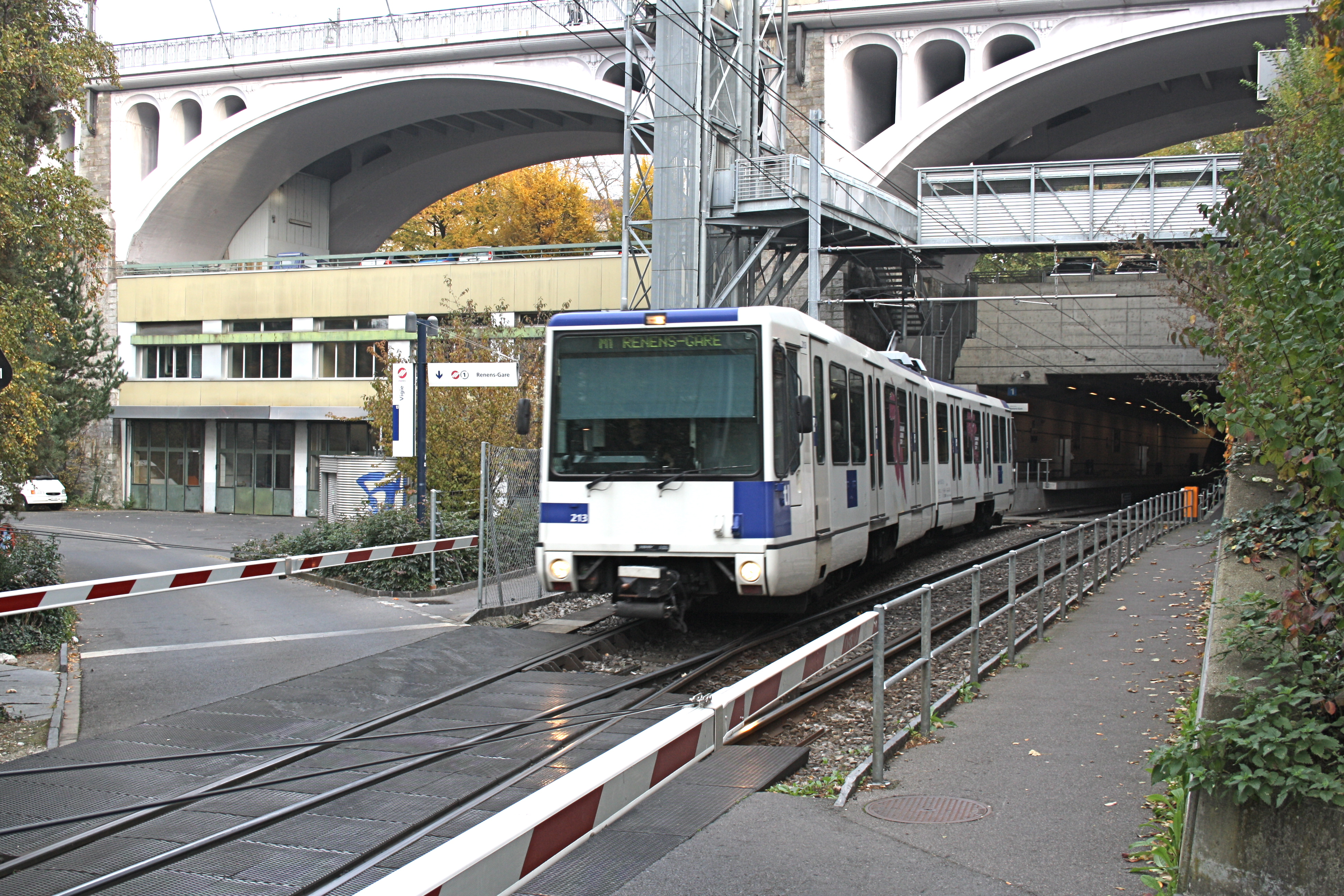
Light rail vehicle near Vigie stop.

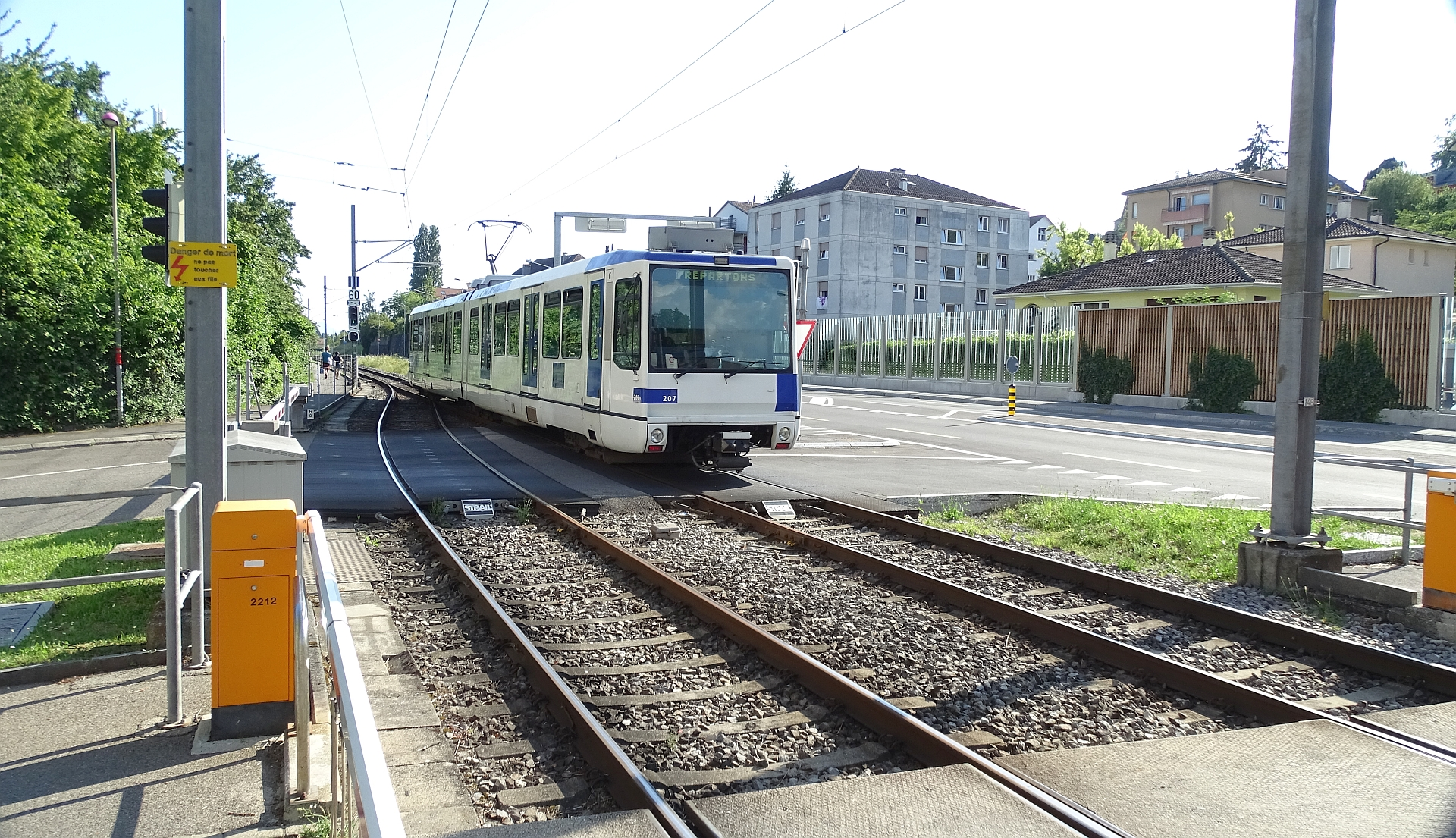
Light rail vehicle between Ecublens and Cerisaie.

The line, which is 7.8 km (4.8 mi) long, links the centre of Lausanne, the Lausanne campus (UNIL and EPFL) and Renens. The line is generally single track. At most stations a passing loop is provided to allow trains to pass, and a dedicated platform is provided for each direction. Exceptions to this are Bassenges, UNIL-Sorge and Provence stations, where the line is still single track serving one bidirectional platform.

Line M1 is hybrid type. It partly runs underground, partly runs on unreserved segregated track with raised rail with granite stones like mainline railway which is completely separated from other vehicles, and partly on elevated track.

== Alignment and Interchanges ==
The modern tram route is completely on segregated rail track, with both underground and elevated sections. It offers a smooth and high speed service, due to little disturbances of road traffic.

Interchanges are made with the Lausanne Metro Line M2 and Lausanne Light Rail at Lausanne-Flon, and with suburban rail at Renens.

== See also ==
- Trams in Lausanne - the first generation tramway network
- Lausanne tramway - the second generation tramway
- Lausanne Metro
- Lausanne–Bercher line
