= Jos (given name) =

Jos is a given name and nickname (often of Joseph, Jozef, Josephus, etc.) which may refer to:

- Jos van Aert (born 1962), Dutch cyclist
- Jos Bax (1946–2020), Dutch footballer
- Jos Baxendell (born 1972), English rugby union player
- Jos Beijnen (born 1956), Dutch pharmacist
- Jos Brink (1942–2007), Dutch actor
- Joseph Jos Broeckx (born 1951), Belgian sprint canoer
- Jocelyn Jos Burley (born 1943), New Zealand female cricketer
- Joseph Jos Buttler (born 1990), English cricketer
- Jozef Jos Chabert (1933–2014), Belgian politician
- Jos Charles (born 1988), American poet
- Jos Chathukulam, Indian academic
- Jozef Jos Daerden (born 1954), Belgian footballer
- Jos De Haes (1920–1974), Belgian writer
- Jos De Mey (1928–2007), Flemish-Belgian painter
- Jos de Putter (born 1959), Dutch film director
- Joseph Jos Deschoenmaecker (born 1947), Belgian cyclist
- Jos Devlies, Belgian physician
- Jos van Eck (born 1963), Dutch former footballer, manager and coach
- Jos van Emden (born 1985), Dutch cyclist
- Jos Engelen (born 1950), Dutch physicist
- Jos Frissen (1892–1982), Dutch painter
- Josephus Jos Geysels (born 1952), Belgian politician
- Jos Gielen (1898-1981), Dutch politician and literary historian
- Jos Haex (born 1959), Belgian cyclist
- Josephus Jos Hermens (born 1950), Dutch long-distance runner
- Jos van Herpen (born 1962), Dutch footballer
- Jozef Jos Heyligen (born 1947), Belgian footballer
- Jos Hinsen (1931-2009), Dutch cyclist
- Jos Hoevenaers (1932–1995), Belgian cyclist
- Jos Hooiveld (born 1983), Dutch footballer
- Jos Huysmans (1941-2012), Belgian cyclist
- Jos Jacobs (born 1953), Belgian cyclist
- Jos Jullien (1877-1956), French painter.
- Josephus Jos van Kemenade (1937-2020), Dutch politician
- Jos Lammertink (born 1958), Dutch cyclist
- Josephus Jos van der Lans (born 1954), Dutch psychologist
- Jozef Jos Lansink (born 1961), Dutch equestrian
- Jos LeDuc (real name Michel Pigeon, 1944–1999), Canadian professional wrestler
- Jozef Lieckens (born 1959), Belgian cyclist
- Jos Luhukay (born 1963), Dutch football coach
- Johannes Jos Lussenburg (1889–1975), Dutch painter
- Jos van Nieuwstadt (born 1979), Dutch footballer
- Jos Pronk (born 1983), Dutch cyclist
- Jozef Jos Punt (born 1946), Dutch Roman Catholic bishop
- Joshua Jos Randles (1865–1925), English footballer
- Jozef Jos van Rey (born 1945), Dutch politician
- Jos Romersa (1915–2016), Luxembourgish gymnast
- Jos Sances (born 1952), American artist
- Jos Seckel (1881–1945), Dutch artist
- Jos Schipper (born 1951), Dutch cyclist
- Jos Schurgers (born 1947), Dutch motorcycle racer
- Jos Stam (born 1965), Dutch computer scientist
- Jos Stelling (born 1945), Dutch film director
- Jos Vaessen (born 1944), Belgian football team president and businessperson
- Jos Van Immerseel (born 1945), Belgian harpsichordist
- Jos van der Vegt (born 1953), Dutch businessperson
- Jos van Veldhoven (born 1952), Dutch choral conductor
- Josephus Jos Vandeloo (1925-2015), Belgian writer and poet
- Jos Verhulst (born 1949), Belgian chemist
- Jos Verstappen (born 1972), Dutch racing driver
- Jos van der Vleuten (1943-2011), Dutch cyclist
- Jos Wohlfart (1920-2000), Luxembourgish politician

== See also ==
- Jos Louis, a snack cake
