= Bax =

Bax may refer to:

- Bax, Haute-Garonne, a commune of France in the Haute-Garonne department
- Bcl-2-associated X protein

Bax, as a surname, may refer to:

- Ad Bax (born 1956), Dutch-American biophysicist
- Alessio Bax (born 1977), Italian classical pianist
- Arnold Bax (1883–1953), British composer
- Bob Bax (c.1936–2000), Australian rugby league footballer and coach
- Clifford Bax (1886–1962), British writer, brother of Arnold
- Ernest Belfort Bax (1854–1926), British socialist, philosopher, and historian
- Etienne Bax (born 1988), Dutch sidecarcross rider
- Jean-Sebastien Bax (born 1972), retired French-Mauritian footballer
- Jos Bax (1946–2020), Dutch footballer
- Kylie Bax (born 1975), New Zealand-born model and actress
- Mart Bax (born 1937), Dutch political anthropologist
- Martin Bax, British paediatrician and arts magazine editor
- Nick Bax (born 1970), British designer

BAX may refer to:

- Bamum language, a language of Cameroon (SIL code: BAX)
- Barnaul Airport, Barnaul, Russia (IATA airport code: 'BAX')
- BAX Global, a shipping company formerly known as Burlington Air Express
- Baxter International (NYSE stock symbol: BAX)
- Huron County Memorial Airport, Bad Axe, Michigan, United States (FAA airport code: BAX)

== See also ==
- BA-X, German job market index
