= Jus =

Jus or JUS may refer to:

== Language ==
- Jussive mood, in grammar
- Yus, two early Cyrillic letters
- Jumla Sign Language, of Nepal (ISO 639-3:jus)

== Law ==
- Jus (law), a right afforded to ancient Romans
- Jus (canon law), a Roman Catholic custom

== Technologies ==
- Japan-US (cable system), a sub-marine telecommunications cable
- Jupiter Upper Stage, a NASA launch vehicle proposal

== Other uses ==
- Jus Reservoir, Malacca, Malaysia
- USA Jet Airlines, a cargo carrier (IATA:JUS)

== People with the given name Jus ==
- Juš Kozak (1892–1964), Slovenian writer
- Juš Milčinski, Slovenian theatre improviser
- Jus Oborn (born 1971), British heavy metal musician

== See also ==
- Au jus, in cooking, meat with sauce
- IUS (disambiguation)
- Ju (disambiguation)
- Juice, liquid fruit
- Jos (disambiguation)
- Joos (disambiguation)
- Juss (disambiguation)
- JWS (disambiguation)
