= Joss (name) =

Joss is a given name and surname.

Notable people with the name include:

== Given name or nickname ==
- Joss Ackland (1928–2023), British actor
- Joss Ambler (1900–1959), Australian-born British film and television actor
- Joss Christensen (born 1991), American freestyle skier and 2014 Olympic gold medalist
- Joss Fritz (c. 1470–c. 1525), insurgent in Germany
- Joss Labadie (born 1990), English footballer
- Joss McKinley (born 1981) English photographic artist
- Joss Naylor (born 1936), English fell runner
- Joss Reimer, Canadian physician
- Joss Sackler, Canadian fashion designer
- Joss Whedon (born 1964), American screenwriter, film and television director and producer, television series creator, comic book author and composer
- George (Duala king) or Joss, a late 18th-century king of the Duala people of Cameroon

== Stage name or pen name ==
- Joss., taxonomic author abbreviation of Marcel Josserand (1900–1992), a French mycologist
- Joss Stirling, a pen name of British novelist Julia Golding (born 1969)
- Joss Stone (born 1987), stage name of British female soul singer, songwriter and actress Joscelyn Eve Stoker
- Lewis Joss, one half of the magic double act Jay & Joss

== Surname ==
- Addie Joss (1880–1911), American Major League Baseball pitcher
- Chris Joss, French musician and record producer
- Johnny Joss (1902–1955), American college football player
- Jonathan Joss (1965–2025), American actor
- Morag Joss (born 1955), English-born Scottish writer
- Robert L. Joss (born 1941), American businessman, banker, professor and former university administrator
- Scott Joss (born 1962), American country musician

== Fictional characters ==
- Joss Carter, from the American television series Person of Interest
- Joss Kendrick, American Girl character
- Joss Merlyn, from the novel Jamaica Inn by Daphne du Maurier
- Joss Moody, from the novel Trumpet by Jackie Kay
- Joss Peroni, from the Australian television series Blue Heelers
- Joss Possible, from the animated American television series Kim Possible
- Palmer Joss, a character in the 1985 science fiction novel Contact

== See also ==
- Joss (disambiguation)
- Jos (given name)
