= Joos (surname) =

Joos is a surname. Notable people with the surname include:

- Amaat Joos (1855–1937), Belgian priest, educationalist, dialectologist and folklorist
- Bernhard Joos (1793–1855), Swiss politician and judge
- Bernhard Joos (1899–1990), Swiss chemist
- Emil Joos (1826–1895), Swiss physician and politician
- Gustaaf Joos (1923–2004), Belgian Roman Catholic cardinal
- Hans Joos (1926–2010), German theoretical physicist
- Hildegard Joos (1909–2005), Austrian painter
- Joseph Joos (1878–1965), German intellectual and politician
- Martin Joos (1907–1978), American linguist and German professor
- Peter Joos (born 1961), Belgian fencer
- Stefan Joos (born 1963), Belgian fencer
- Victor J. Joos (1938–2019), American politician
- Wilhelm Joos (1821–1900), Swiss physician and politician

== See also ==
- Joos (given name)
