= Spirit Soldier rebellions =

Spirit Soldier rebellions could refer to the following events in China:

- Spirit Soldier rebellions (1920–1926), centered in Hubei and Sichuan
- Spirit Soldier rebellion (1959), an anti-Communist uprising in Sizhuang, Henan
