= Joos =

Joos may refer to:

- Joos (given name)
- Joos (surname)

== See also ==
- Jos (disambiguation)
- Joss (disambiguation)
