= Juss =

Juss may refer to:

- Satvinder S. Juss (fl. 1990s–2020s), English professor of law
- Juss (given name), a masculine given name
- Juss., Antoine Laurent de Jussieu (1748–1836), French botanist
- A.Juss., Adrien-Henri de Jussieu (1797–1853), French botanist
- Ant.Juss., Antoine de Jussieu (1686–1758), French naturalist, botanist, and physician
- J.Juss., Joseph de Jussieu (1704–1779), French botanist
- Lord Juss, chief lord of Demonland in the 1922 E. R. Eddison novel, The Worm Ouroboros

== See also ==
- Jus (disambiguation)
