= Slavery in Switzerland =

History of slavery and slave trade involvement in Switzerland

Slavery in Switzerland encompasses the historical practice of slavery within Swiss territories from the Roman era through the Middle Ages, as well as Swiss involvement in the Atlantic slave trade and plantation slavery in the Americas during the early modern period. While Switzerland never established overseas colonies, Swiss merchants, financiers, and individuals played significant roles in the transatlantic slave trade and owned enslaved people in colonial plantations, particularly during the 18th and early 19th centuries.

The history of slavery in Switzerland spans several distinct phases: the Roman period when slavery was legally regulated and widespread; the medieval transformation of slavery into various forms of serfdom; and the early modern period when Swiss merchants and capitalists became involved in the Atlantic slave trade and colonial plantation systems. Swiss participation in the slave trade from 1719 to 1830 resulted in the transportation of over 170,000 enslaved Africans, representing approximately 2% of all captives transported by European vessels during this period.

== Roman period and antiquity ==
During the Roman Empire, slavery was legally regulated and widespread throughout Swiss territories. Under Roman law, enslaved people were considered property (res) of their owners (dominus). The legal framework governing slavery was based on Roman law and later colonial legal codes that followed this tradition, particularly those of Spain and Portugal. In Anglo-Saxon territories and their colonies, slavery was regulated by common law.

Archaeological evidence suggests that enslaved people were involved in various economic activities, including agriculture, construction, domestic service, and crafts. Tiles found at Cerlier and Wettswil am Albis indicate that enslaved people participated in tile production. A votive plaque discovered at the Great St Bernard Pass was dedicated to Jupiter Poeninus by Gaius Domitius Carassounus, a Helvetic slave trader (mango) who was himself a freed slave of Celtic origin, demonstrating the existence of established slave trading networks passing through Swiss territory.

The influx of enslaved people was sustained as long as the Romans expanded their empire and were engaged in conflicts in frontier regions. During more peaceful times, they relied more heavily on slaves born into slavery (vernae) to meet labor demands. To prevent the use of enslaved prisoners of war in their regions of origin due to fear of revolts, these individuals were distributed throughout the empire through commercial networks.

Enslaved people could be owned not only by individuals but also by cities and corporations. In such cases, they were often responsible for maintaining urban infrastructure, building roads and public buildings, and performing administrative tasks. Imperial slaves and especially freedmen who had belonged to the emperor were employed in numerous administrative activities. In Geneva, Aurelius Valens, an imperial freedman who himself owned freedmen and slaves, was responsible for the city's customs post.

According to Roman law, slaves could be freed from the age of 30. Earlier manumissions were possible but resulted in a degraded legal status. The legal status of freedmen depended on that of their former master, who became their patron. If the patron possessed Roman citizenship, his freedmen became either Roman citizens or Latin citizens with limited matrimonial and inheritance rights. However, Roman law distinguished between those born free (ingenui) and freedmen (libertini/liberti). Children of free people and freedmen were considered freeborn, and in cases of doubt, the mother's status at birth was determinant.

== Medieval period ==
The various powers that succeeded the Roman Empire and occupied the territory of present-day Switzerland drew inspiration from Roman law, also adopting its provisions regarding slavery while adapting them to their societal context through barbarian laws. During the Early Middle Ages, slaves or unfree people had limited rights regarding property and church-sanctioned marriage (formariage). Their situation remained precarious as recognition of their rights depended on their masters, and there were few possibilities for recourse.

The Latin term servus (slave) probably lost its original meaning around the year 1000 and thereafter designated other forms of dependence, including freedmen, free men, and those subject to corvée labor. From the 8th century onward, in northeastern Switzerland at least, people spoke of mancipii (serfdom) – derived from Roman mancipatio – and servitores (servants) rather than servi. Regarding the status and rights of contemporary tenants as well as Alemannic law, the condition of these serfs and servants cannot be fully compared to that of slaves in Roman antiquity.

From the 12th century, the word "slave" (derived from the ethnic designation "Slave" from which the word "slave" is derived) was used as an alternative term for servus. During the increasing Christianization of the Roman Empire, slavery was not fundamentally questioned, with religious institutions and monasteries themselves owning slaves. The possibility of manumission by the Church (manumissio in ecclesia) was introduced, though in the ecclesiastical sphere, freedmen were not placed on equal footing with those born free.

== Early modern period and Atlantic slave trade ==
=== Swiss involvement in the slave trade ===
With European "discovery" of the Americas and its colonial exploitation, Switzerland became involved in the Atlantic system of exchanges linking Europe, Africa, and the Americas. The establishment of plantation economies in European American colonies, demanding intensive labor, prompted Europeans and American colonial elites to organize massive population displacement from African coasts, relying on local networks, particularly in West Africa.

From 1519 to 1867, the main European merchants involved in the slave trade came from Portugal and Great Britain. Between the early 16th and late 19th centuries, the Atlantic slave trade supplied America with 10 to 11 million captured Africans destined for enslavement. The majority of Swiss people appeared in this vast Atlantic exchange network during its peak in the second half of the 18th century as textile manufacturers, major merchants, and financiers.

Swiss trading companies involved in the Atlantic circuit not only sold calico (printed cotton fabrics), which were excellent trading goods, but also took shares in the slave trade and sold commodities (sugar, coffee, cocoa, cotton) produced by enslaved labor in American colonies. These companies were mostly from Basel (Christoph Burckhardt & Cie, Weis & fils, Riedy & Thurninger, Kuster & Pelloutier, Simon & Roques), Neuchâtel (Favre-Petitpierre & Cie, Pourtalès et Cie, Gorgerat Frères & Cie), and Geneva (Labat Frères, Rivier & Cie, Jean-Louis Baux & Cie).

Purely financial involvement by the Swiss brought forth financiers such as the Neuchâtel native David de Pury, banks including Marcuard & Cie and Zeerleder & Cie of Bern, and Tourton & Baur and Mallet frères & Cie with strong Genevan connections, and even cities like Bern and Zurich. These actors were most often shareholders in large chartered companies such as the Portuguese Pernambuco e Paraíba, the French Compagnie des Indes, or the English South Sea Company, all engaged to varying degrees in the slave trade and colonial commerce.

=== Plantation ownership ===
Swiss involvement in slavery extended beyond the slave trade to actual ownership and use of enslaved people in colonial America. Swiss individuals, primarily planters and occasionally merchants, owned and used slaves mainly as agricultural workers but also as employees and domestic servants. In the 18th century, they were found first in the Caribbean (including Dutch Guiana and Suriname), then after slave revolts in Saint-Domingue (Haiti) and Jamaica, rather in the southern United States and Brazil.

Swiss plantation owners rarely operated their estates themselves, which were dedicated to cultivating sugar, coffee, cocoa, cotton, or rice. They delegated administration to agents, sometimes Swiss, established on-site. Among absentee owners managing their plantations primarily from Switzerland or major European centers (Amsterdam, London) were notably Jacques-Louis de Pourtalès and his Basel associate Johann Jakob Thurneysen, who owned large plantations on the island of Grenada. This was also the case for the Basel brothers Johannes and Johann Jakob Faesch, the Vaudois Jean Samuel Guisan, and the Neuchâtel native Pierre Alexandre DuPeyrou.

Genevan plantation owners included François Fatio, Michel Trollet, David Flournois, Isaac Vernet, Jean Gallatin, and Jean Zacharie Robin. Among owners who operated their estates themselves and resided on-site were Genevans in the Caribbean and Dutch Guiana including Jean Trembley, Ami Butini, Charles-Alexandre Dunant, Jacques Théodore Colladon, Jean Antoine Bertrand, Henri Peschier, and Henri Rieu, along with Raymond Marie and Pierre Gautier, who were among planters compensated after the Haitian Revolution (1791–1803) for the loss of their property.

Swiss from other cantons were also present in the Caribbean and South America as plantation owners, such as the Zurich native Friedrich Ludwig Escher (uncle of Alfred Escher) in Cuba and the St. Gallen native Paulus Züblin in Guyana. In South Carolina, two Swiss colonies, one founded by the Neuchâtel native Jean Pierre de Pury (father of David de Pury) and another by the Appenzell native Johannes Tobler, were established on lands partially worked using enslaved labor. In the 19th century, Swiss immigrants, mainly from Vaud, Neuchâtel, and Zurich, arrived in Brazil and settled in the regions of Bahia and São Paulo, where they cultivated coffee on large slave-operated plantations.

=== Impact and scale ===
Swiss participation in all its forms in the Atlantic slave trade resulted in the displacement of more than 170,000 Black people from 1719 to 1830, representing approximately 2% of all African captives embarked by European vessels during this period of more than a century. Case studies show that for the Swiss, the slave trade represented only a small fraction of their trading and investment activities, making them circumstantial slave traders. Like other European countries, Switzerland nevertheless had enslaved people from the colonies on its territory, such as Pauline Buisson, brought to Yverdon in the 1770s by David-Philippe de Treytorrens, who had been her owner in Saint-Domingue.

The transatlantic slave trade had dramatic consequences on indigenous ways of life, languages, and cultures. Many men, women, and children died during slave hunts or forced marches to African coasts. Others died in forts where they were often imprisoned for long months awaiting sale. According to scientific estimates, approximately three-quarters of slave deaths occurred in Africa. If slaves survived the dangerous Atlantic crossing, they were resold in port cities. Branded with marks designating their owners, they then had an average life expectancy of only four to six years.

== Federal period ==
In the 19th century, Switzerland maintained official relations with slaveholding powers. While relations with Great Britain (abolition of slavery in 1838), France (1848), and the Netherlands (1863) were long-standing, those with other countries like the United States (1865) and Brazil (1888) were more recent. Having abstained from any overseas territorial expansion, the Swiss Confederation was not directly involved in administering colonies and plantations. However, some politicians who helped shape the young federal state cultivated close ties with the colonial world.

On December 23, 1863, National Councilor Wilhelm Joos submitted a motion demanding the government's progressive abolition of slavery, implicitly concerning American countries where it was still practiced. Advocating since the early 1860s for overseas emigration as a remedy against unemployment, Joos had observed during a stay in Brazil that the slave economy limited employment opportunities for Swiss emigrants. Invoking ethical principles, he proposed measures to prohibit Swiss people from buying or selling slaves. Rejected by the National Council, his motion was not debated by the Federal Council.

On July 13, 1864, Joos submitted a new motion. Since ethical motives had not had the expected effect, he now defended the numerous Swiss colonists who worked the land as sharecroppers in Brazil. Viewed from this angle, the National Council accepted the new motion and transmitted it to the national executive for position-taking. The Federal Council presented a detailed report on the subject on December 2, 1864. The opinion issued by the government, based largely on expertise from Johann Jakob von Tschudi, former extraordinary envoy of the Confederation to Brazil, and Henri David, former honorary consul general in Rio de Janeiro, was negative.

The prohibition on Swiss people selling or buying slaves, as requested by the motioner, would not only not have improved the condition of Swiss labor in Brazil but would have also deprived Swiss owners "of part of their legitimately acquired fortune." Among these, the Federal Council emphasized, were state representatives such as Eugène Emile Raffard, Swiss consul general in Rio. Joos criticized the report during a parliamentary debate on December 10, 1864, judging that the Federal Council underestimated the real situation in Brazil and citing the imminent abolition of slavery in the United States as an additional argument to push Switzerland to act in an abolitionist direction.

The slavery question was not officially debated in Bern again until Switzerland's 1920 accession to the League of Nations. The Confederation subsequently ratified a series of international treaties: in 1930 the League of Nations Slavery Convention, and in 1964 the Supplementary Convention on the Abolition of Slavery of the United Nations. In 1974, it adhered to the European Convention on Human Rights, then in 1992 to the International Covenant on Civil and Political Rights, which also contain articles prohibiting slavery.

The Durban Declaration, adopted in 2001 by the UN World Conference against Racism, qualifies the slave trade as a "crime against humanity." One of the Swiss delegates stated before the conference that the Confederation, which was among the signatory countries of the declaration, had never been involved in this type of commerce or in colonialism. This viewpoint, which current historical research contradicts, was regularly repeated by members of the Federal Council, notably by Doris Leuthard in 2017 during a trip to Benin and by Ignazio Cassis in 2021 on the Samstagrundschau Swiss-German radio show, provoking several parliamentary interventions. Unlike countries such as the United States, the Netherlands, Denmark, and the British Crown, Switzerland has not presented official apologies concerning slavery.

== Bibliography ==
=== Core sources ===
- Corpus Inscriptionum Latinarum, 1863-.
- Howald, Ernst; Meyer, Ernst (éd.): Die römische Schweiz. Texte und Inschriften mit Übersetzung, 1940.
- Walser, Gerold: Römische Inschriften in der Schweiz, 3 vol., 1979-1980.
- Kolb, Anne: Tituli Helvetici. Die römischen Inschriften der West- und Ostschweiz, 2022.

=== Secondary literature ===
- Stähelin, Felix: Die Schweiz in römischer Zeit, 1927 (19483).
- Drack, Walter; Fellmann, Rudolf: Die Römer in der Schweiz, 1988.
- Speidel, Michael Alexander: "Ein römischer Ziegel mit Ritzinschrift aus dem Ziegelbrennofen Josenmatt bei Wettswil", in: Berichte der Kantonsarchäologie Zürich, 13, 1996, pp. 193-198.
- Miers, Suzanne: Slavery in the Twentieth Century. The Evolution of a Global Problem, 2003.
- David, Thomas; Etemad, Bouda; Schaufelbuehl, Janick Marina: La Suisse et l'esclavage des Noirs, 2005.
- Grant, Kevin: A Civilised Savagery. Britain and the New Slaveries in Africa, 1884-1926, 2005.
- Davis, David Brion: Inhuman Bondage. The Rise and Fall of Slavery in the New World, 2006.
- Heinen, Heinz (éd.): Handwörterbuch der antiken Sklaverei, 3 vol., 2006-2017.
- Fässler, Hans: Une Suisse esclavagiste. Voyage dans un pays au-dessus de tout soupçon, 2007 (allemand 2005).
- Meissner, Jochen; Mücke, Ulrich; Weber, Klaus: Schwarzes Amerika. Eine Geschichte der Sklaverei, 2008.
- Etemad, Bouda: "Investir dans la traite. Les milieux d'affaires suisses et leurs réseaux atlantiques", in: Augeron, Mickaël; Poton, Didier; Van Ruymbeke, Bertrand (éd.): Les Huguenots et l'Atlantique, vol. 1, 2009, pp. 527-538.
- Herrmann-Otto, Elisabeth: Sklaverei und Freilassung in der griechisch-römischen Welt, 2009 (20172).
- Kuhn, Konrad J.; Ziegler, Béatrice: "Die Schweiz und die Sklaverei. Zum Spannungsfeld zwischen Geschichtspolitik und Wissenschaft", in: Traverse, 16/1, 2009, pp. 116-130.
- Zeuske, Michael: Handbuch Geschichte der Sklaverei. Eine Globalgeschichte von den Anfängen bis zur Gegenwart, 2 vol., 2013 (20192).
- Zeuske, Michael: Sklavenhändler, Negreros und Atlantikkreolen. Eine Weltgeschichte des Sklavenhandels im atlantischen Raum, 2015.
- Rio, Alice: Slavery after Rome, 500-1100, 2017.
- Zeuske, Michael: Sklaverei. Eine Menschheitsgeschichte von der Steinzeit bis heute, 2018.
- Etemad, Bouda: "Le palais Dupeyrou. Un monumental legs à Neuchâtel de 'Monsieur de Surinam'", in: Augeron, Mickaël (éd.): Figures huguenotes dans les Amériques. De l'histoire à la mémoire, 2020, pp. 191-198.
- Ismard, Paulin (dir.): Les mondes de l'esclavage. Une histoire comparée, 2021.
- Etemad, Bouda: De Rousseau à Dunant. La colonisation et l'esclavage vus de Genève, 2022.
- Schär, Bernhard C.: "Switzerland, Borneo and the Dutch Indies: towards a new imperial history of Europe, c. 1770-1850", in: Past & Present, 257/1, 2022, pp. 134-167.
- Zeuske, Michael: Afrika – Atlantik – Amerika. Sklaverei und Sklavenhandel in Afrika, auf dem Atlantik und in den Amerikas sowie in Europa, 2022.
- Kreis, Georg: Blicke auf die koloniale Schweiz. Ein Forschungsbericht, 2023.
- Santos Pinto, Jovita dos: "Toiles, rendement, esclavage. La Suisse à l'Atlantique noir", in: Musée national suisse (éd.): Colonialisme. Une Suisse impliquée, 2024, pp. 97-121 (catalogue d'exposition).
