= Spirit Soldier rebellions (1920–1926) =

Peasant uprisings in Republic of China

- Part of the Warlord Era
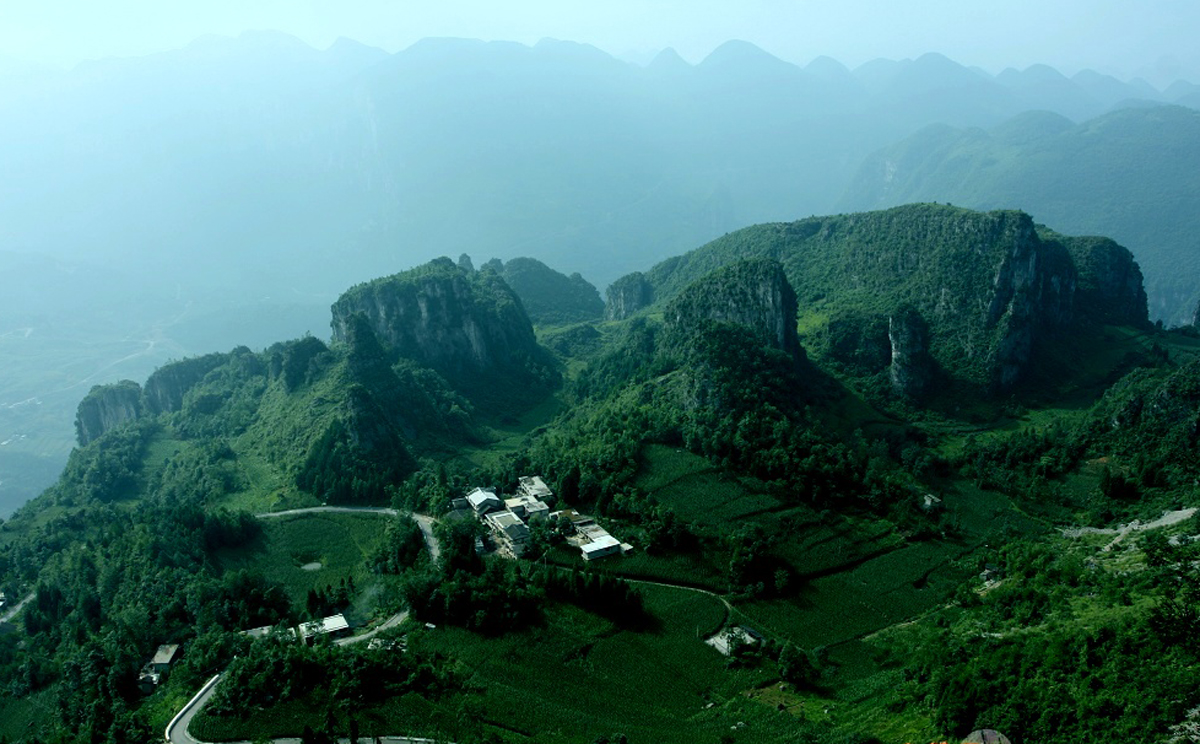
- The Spirit Soldier movement originated from and was centered in the mountainous, isolated counties of western Hubei (Enshi Prefecture pictured)
Date	1920 (Note: Based on a 1928 report of the Shanghai Central Daily News, historian Tai Hsüan-chih dated the beginning of the Spirit Soldiers movement to 1925 in eastern Sichuan. This is however contradicted by other contemporary records as well as later eyewitness interviews.)–1926
Location	Hubei and Sichuan, China
Result	Stalemate: Large Spirit Soldier armies collapse, but rebel movement remains active and spreads; Emergence of Chinese Communist Party in conflict area; alliance of Spirit Soldiers with Red Armies of He Long and Xu Xiangqian

Belligerents
Spirit Soldiers (Note: "Spirit Soldiers" (Wade–Giles: Shen Ping, pinyin: Shenbing) has been alternatively translated as "Joss soldiers", "supernatural soldiers", and "immortal boys". They were also known as "Heavenly Soldiers" (Wade–Giles: T'ien-ping) or "Divine Army".); Allied warlord forces	Republic of China: Zhili clique; Sichuan warlords; Hubei warlords; Guizhou forces; Bandits

Commanders and leaders
Spirit Soldiers: Yuan, the self-proclaimed "Jade Emperor"; Wang Tzu-cheng; Chang †; Wang Hsi-chiu †; Yang Tse-kun; Hsiang Ting-hsi; Warlords: Xiong Kewu (from 1924)	Warlords: Wu Peifu; Wang Zhanyuan; Yang Sen; Xiong Kewu (until 1924); Yuan Zuming; Chou Fu-yu; Bandits: Lao Yangren

Units involved
Peasant armies and militias Xiong Kewu's army (from 1924)	Warlord armies Bandit groups

Strength
100,000+	Tens of thousands

Casualties and losses
Heavy	Heavy

The Spirit Soldier rebellions of 1920–1926 were a series of major peasant uprisings against state authorities and warlords in the Republic of China's provinces of Hubei and Sichuan during the Warlord Era. Following years of brutal suppression, civil war, and excessive taxation, the rural population of central China was restive, and susceptible to militant salvationist movements. One spiritual group, the so-called Spirit Soldiers, promised the peasants that they could gain protection from modern weaponry through protective magic. Tens of thousands consequently rallied to join the Spirit Soldiers, and successfully revolted in the mountainous and isolated areas of Hubei and Sichuan. At its height, the Spirit Soldier movement numbered over 100,000 fighters, and controlled about forty counties.

The Spirit Soldiers had early military victories, but, relative to their opponents, lacked organization, a cohesive ideology and modern weaponry. As a result, they could not prevail in the face of concentrated counter-offensives by the Chinese warlord armies. The Spirit Soldiers’ main armies were defeated and dispersed in 1926. Despite this, the movement remained active and continued to spread into neighboring provinces. Several Spirit Soldier factions consequently allied themselves with the Chinese Communist Party, providing crucial support to the latter's nascent insurgency in central China.

== Background ==
=== Warlordism and peasant rebellions in China ===
Good iron does not make nails, good men do not make soldiers.

— Anti-militaristic Chinese proverb

Having suffered from internal instability for decades, China fully disintegrated upon the death of Yuan Shikai in 1916. In the following Warlord Era, military strongmen used private armies to carve out their own territories while fighting each other in order to achieve supremacy. In the process, the warlords caused great suffering for China's civilian population. They brutally suppressed opposition, raised high taxes, and in many cases allowed their armies to plunder, rape, and enslave civilians. This, combined with the constant wars between the warlords, led to destitution, hunger, and the rise of banditry in many areas. Some regions suffered more than others from the warlords' rule. Less developed, and more remote parts of China, such as the country's south, centre and west were most adversely affected. They were often rather poor and isolated to begin with, and crises were less likely to be alleviated by outside help. Furthermore, warlord armies of these regions were less well equipped, fed and disciplined than their equivalents in the more wealthy north and coastal regions of China. The warlord soldiers of southern China consequently treated civilians especially badly, regularly exploiting and abusing them.

As a result, peasants in rural China generally perceived outsiders like soldiers, tax collectors, and other state agents as "foreign" or "parasite" in nature, and were deeply hostile toward them. In an attempt to evict these groups from their lands, or at least in order to resist the collection of rents and taxes, peasants launched a great number of uprisings, riots, and protests during the Warlord Era. Varying greatly in their intensity and importance, such disturbances often erupted spontaneously and were frequent during years of poor harvests. In several cases, the peasants joined or organized militant secret societies that acted as self defense and vigilante groups. In most cases, however, the peasants were unable to form cohesive movements and their resistance was easily crushed by the warlords.

=== Situation in western Hubei and eastern Sichuan ===
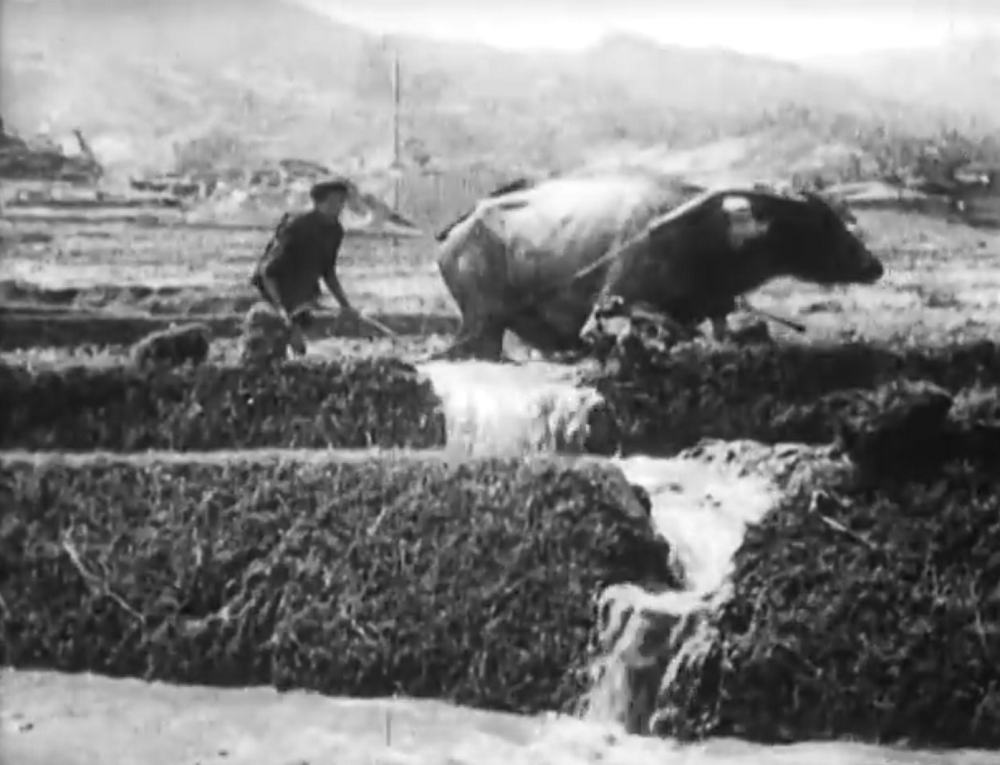
A Chinese peasant on the fields in the 1910s or 1920s.

After the National Protection War of 1915–1916, Hubei and Sichuan had fallen into chaos, as various warlords carved out their own fiefdoms. Sichuan became home to a very large number of warlords, some of them little more than villages leaders or bandit chiefs while others led armies several thousand strong. These military strongmen constantly fought each other. As a result, hundreds of thousands of soldiers, militiamen and bandits roamed the two provinces during the Warlord Era, causing widespread instability. Further tensions existed due to the fact that the local warlords often acknowledged the nominal authority of the central government and the more powerful warlords in northern China, but distrusted them and wanted to maintain their autonomy.

Besides the chaotic infighting among the armies of Sichuan and Hubei, the two provinces were affected by additional divisions between the different ethnic and social groups. While the valleys and plains of Sichuan and Hubei were dominated by Han Chinese, the highlands harbored a mixed population of Han migrants and non-Han groups like the Miao, Tujia, and others. The latter felt traditionally oppressed by the plainspeople and had long resisted Han immigration as well as influence from the Chinese central governments. The highlanders were thus more versed in organizing self-defense forces and more prone to revolting than the Han population. In this context, belief systems were also of great importance. Although the Han Chinese migrants and highland people rarely inter-married, they culturally influenced each other. This gave rise of a highly heterodox cultural and religious environment in which ancestor worship, and belief in magic as well as possession played a major role. In the context of the long struggle for autonomy by the highlanders, gods, heroes, and ancestors were often associated with past resistance and rebellions. These elements helped to popularize the so-called "spirit soldiers" – the belief that one could summon divine beings that would fight alongside or possess a fighter, granting the marginalized and weak the ability to oppose stronger opponents. The belief in spirit soldiers was often integrated into messianic and apocalyptic movements in Chinese history, giving rise to the idea that saviors in human guise would arrive in times of immense crisis, leading an army of spirit soldiers, and establish a new and fair rule on earth. (Note: For example, the sect leader Ma Chaozhu was active in Hubei from 1747 to 1752, proclaiming that a member of the House of Zhu resided in a hidden kingdom in Sichuan and would soon lead an army of spirit soldiers to destroy the Qing dynasty and restore the Ming dynasty.)

Amid this volatile situation, a power vacuum came to be in western Hubei in 1920. The 30,000-strong army of warlords Li Tiancai, Lan Tianwei, Bao Wenwei, and Wang Tianzong which had previously controlled the Enshi-Hefeng area had been driven away by Hubei governor Wang Zhanyuan. This allowed the local communities to organize themselves to resist the warlord soldiers and bandits.

== Rebellion ==
=== Initial uprisings ===
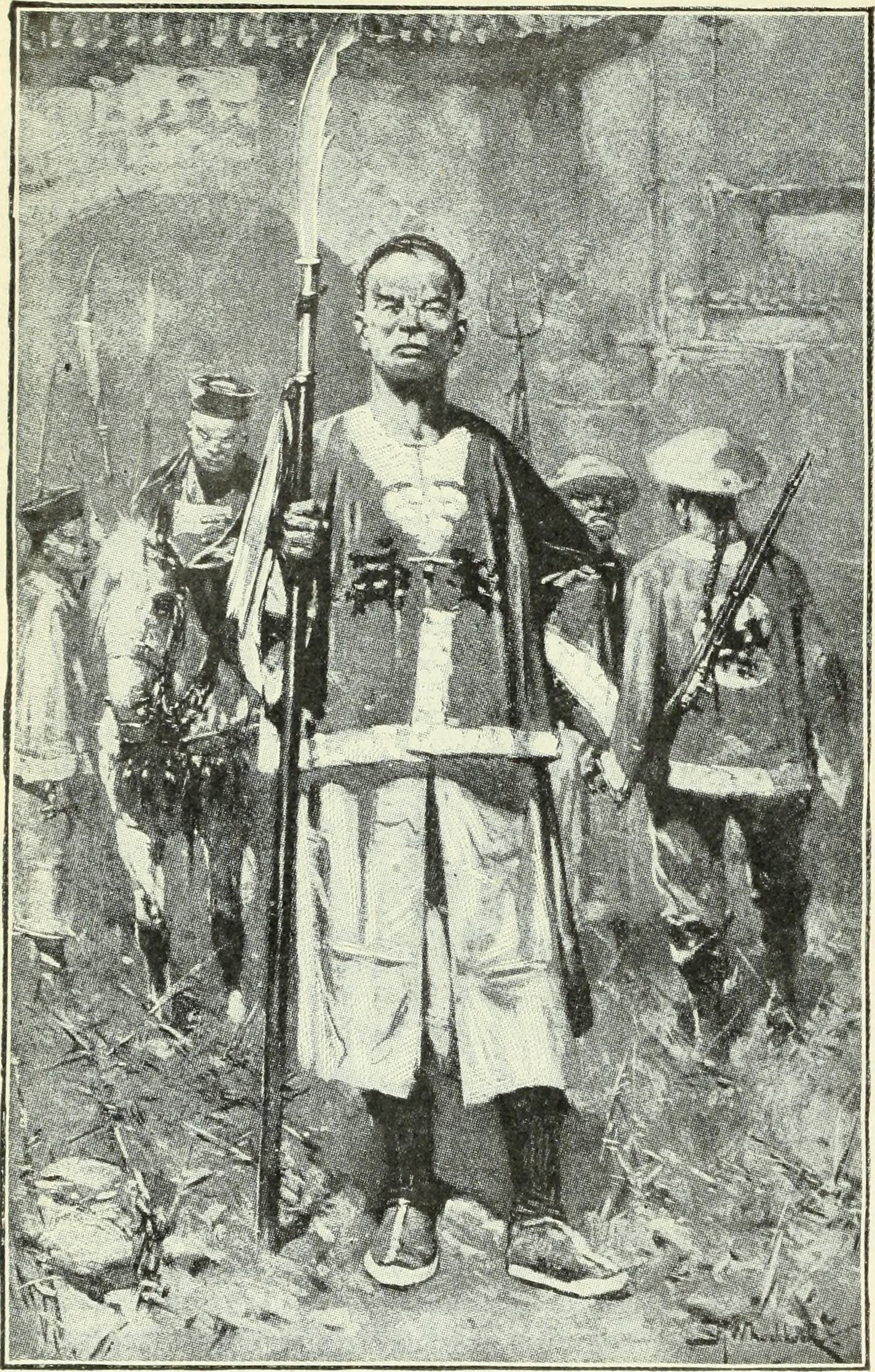
The Spirit Soldiers were likened to the Boxers (pictured) due to their reliance on close quarters combat and belief in magic to overcome better armed opponents.

Having suffered from deprivations and high taxes at the hands of the warlords, the rural populace of Hubei and Sichuan became increasingly restive. The discontent escalated in 1920 when a group of Taoist priests started a militant and spiritual movement opposed to militarism and taxation in Lichuan, Hubei. It was initially a small association of about 100 people. The movement's slogan "Kill the Warlords and Out with Rotten Officials and Loafers" found wide appeal, while the priests taught that anyone could become a heaven-blessed "Spirit Soldier" by undergoing magical rituals. These rituals such as drinking a special fluid or eating the ashes of burned amulets, were supposed to make the "Spirit Soldiers" invulnerable to gunfire and raise their bravery. Convinced that they could finally overcome the government authorities' superior weaponry, thousands joined the movement and launched an open rebellion. Despite being mostly armed with just close quarters weaponry such as spears and dao broadswords, the peasant rebels overran Lichuan County and killed the local magistrate, whereupon the movement spread into the surrounding regions.

At this point, the Spirit Soldiers numbered over 10,000 fighters, and their forces would continue to grow over the next few years. Though the movement would eventually develop a relatively sophisticated organization, it was never really unified. The rebel forces split into three main armies as well as numerous militias early on, and had formed six main branches by 1928. These different groups did not much coordinate their activities. While the Spirit Soldiers generally lacked military training, modern weaponry, and uniforms, they attempted to organize their forces into actual armies. They introduced military ranks, and the rebel fighters identified themselves by wearing a yellow band around their left hand's middle finger since yellow served as "official color" of their movement. In addition, each major Spirit Soldier group dressed in a specific color. For example, the Spirit Soldiers in western Hubei mostly wore red turbans and sashs. They also carried flags into battle, many of them red, which were inscribed with their leaders' names or slogans that urged for "heavenly" or "universal peace" and the establishment of a "heavenly kingdom" on earth.

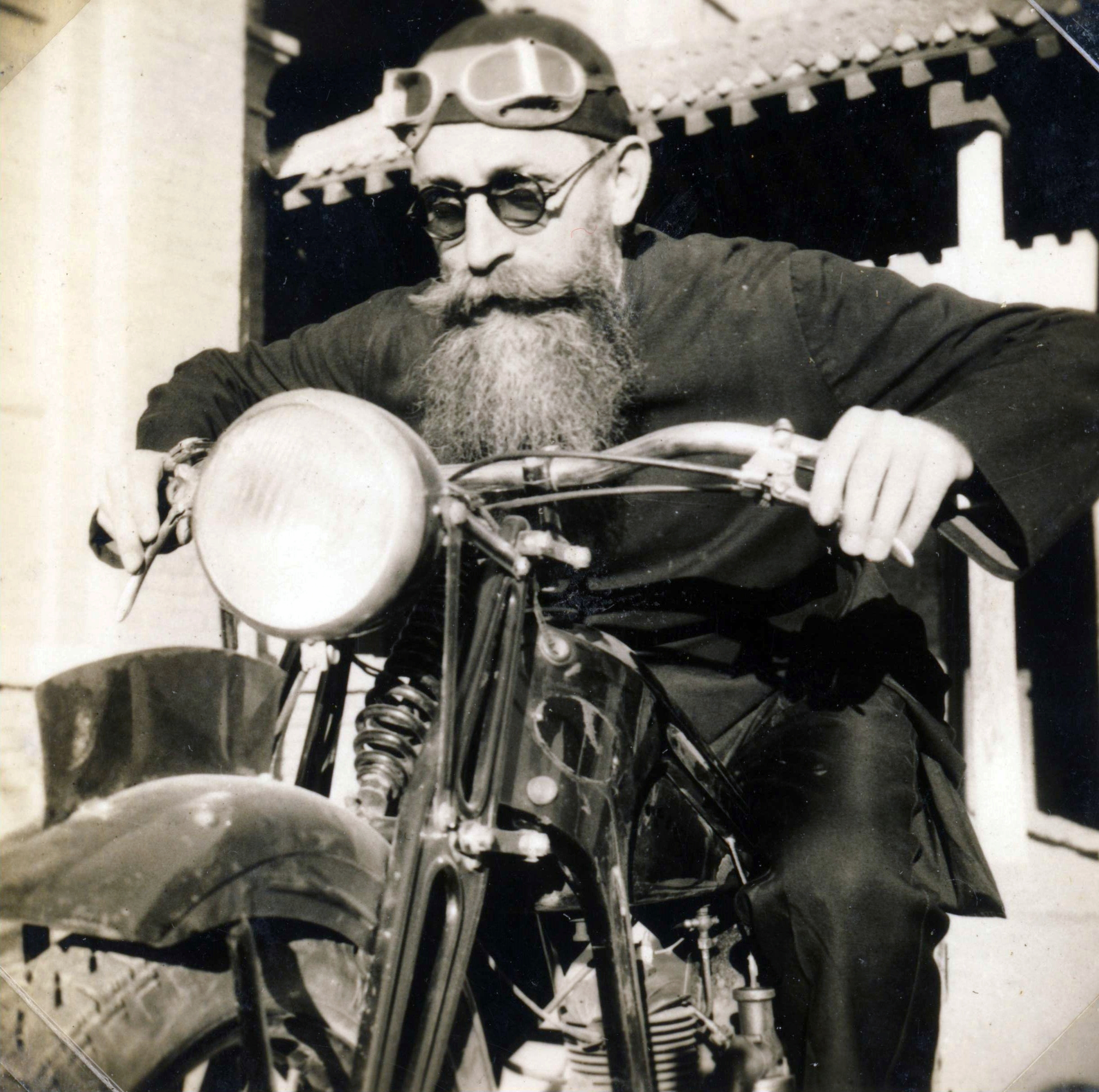
A Jesuit missionary on an Asahi motorcycle in China in 1939. The Spirit Soldiers were hostile toward Western-influenced modernization and Christianity.

Besides such vague slogans and the aim of overthrowing the existing authorities, the rebels had few concrete aims. Most of the Spirit Soldiers did not want to seize political power, and had no revolutionary ideology. Despite having an affinity with the poor, they would not try to change the political or social order when occupying counties. Instead the old magistrate would simply be replaced with a new one "who appeared to be a 'good' man". One observer noted that such minor changes often failed to permanently improve the situation of the peasants. Despite this, the Spirit Soldiers' rule was widely perceived as "benevolent" in comparison with the warlords' regime. The peasant rebels prevented the collection of rents and taxes by the government, and drove away both marauding warlord soldiers as well as bandits. The areas the insurgents had conquered were considered to be safe for unarmed travellers. To finance themselves, the Spirit Soldiers fought bandits and warlords for control of the salt and opium trade routes which ran from Sichuan and Guizhou through western Hubei. The Spirit Soldiers were also noted for persecuting Christians and foreigners. This was due to the rebels' belief that Western-style modernization as well as Christianity had brought chaos to China by subjecting it to foreign ideas. They consequently wanted to purge their territories from Western influences.

=== Battle of Wanzhou ===
Map showing centers of the Spirit Soldiers in Hubei and at the border to Sichuan (modern-day Chongqing)

Soon after its launch, the Spirit Soldiers movement spread westward into Sichuan, where it directly affected the regional trade center of Wanzhou. In late 1920, a number of Spirit Soldiers from Lichuan came to Wanzhou. Led by the peasants Hsiang Ting-hsi and Yang Tse-kun, they spread the message of their movement in the town's suburbs using slogans such as "Stand Against Rents and Taxes", and "Kill the Grey Dogs" (warlord soldiers). In a few months, they managed to gather 4,000 supporters from the town and the nearby villages. The insurgents then set up their headquarters at the local temple for Yama, armed themselves with simple weapons including bamboo spears and launched a grand assault against Wanzhou town on 5 March 1921. Attacking in two waves of about 2,000 fighters, the Spirit Soldiers terrified the local warlord soldiers, as they fought ferociously with bared upper body, unafraid of bullets. Despite being armed with guns, the soldiers believed their opponents to be actually protected by magic and fled from Wanzhou's outskirts behind the walls of the inner town.

Though they had managed to capture most of the town, the Spirit Soldiers did not capitalize on their success, instead "composing chants and parading" through the streets. The remaining warlord forces managed to hold out, and shot a number of Spirit Soldiers from behind the inner town's walls. They consequently realized that they could actually kill the rebels, and launched a counter-attack on 8 March. Heavy fighting lasted almost the entire day, but the warlord forces prevailed and had mostly ousted the Spirit Soldiers from Wanzhou by nightfall. About 500 people died in course of this battle, the majority of them rebels.

On 12 March, warlord Chou Fu-yu arrived in the area with reinforcements and attacked the Spirit Soldiers at their temple headquarters, killing about 1,000 of them, including most of their leaders. Following this defeat, the insurgents around Wanzhou scattered. Most of the survivors in Wanzhou County returned to civilian life, but a significant number continued the insurgency. Several retreated into the mountains of Hubei, where they joined the main Spirit Soldier armies, while others stayed in Sichuan. The latter were mostly small militias that behaved like bandits, so that officials lamented that "whole country districts [were] laid waste" as the rebels plundered them. Instead of attempting to seize and hold territory, they would capture towns, expel foreigners and missionaries, and then move on. For several years after the Wanzhou incursion, permanent Spirit Soldier bases in Sichuan were restricted to areas which were close to the border with Hubei.

=== Height and decline of the movement ===
Map showing centers of the Spirit Soldier movement in western Hubei (modern-day Chongqing) and Guizhou

Despite the setback in Sichuan, the Spirit Soldiers continued to flourish and expand in Hubei, driving warlord forces from large parts of the province. Many counties fell to the insurgents, including Xuan'en, Badong, Yichang, and Enshi. One insurgent leader, a former farm worker named Yuan, even felt confident enough to declare himself the "Jade Emperor" at his base in western Hubei. Active around 1920–1922, he began to issue numerous edicts, in which he railed against "students, farmers, labourers, employers, merchants, and military, and, lastly, the missionaries". He openly called for the violent extermination of all Christian priests, blaming them for the country's problems and promising his followers that with Christianity gone peace would return to China. Other Spirit Soldiers wanted to restore the Ming dynasty which they saw a highpoint in China's history. Under the Ming, the Chinese had ruled their own country and not been subject to the Manchu Qing dynasty or western foreigners.

The Spirit Soldiers were aided in their expansion by the continuing infighting among the warlords of Hubei and Sichuan. The conflicts in western Hubei remained very chaotic, with not just the Spirit Soldiers but also warlord forces from other provinces and bandits invading the region. Zhili clique armies loyal to northern warlord Wu Peifu moved from Hunan and Sichuan into Hubei in 1921. The northern forces were repelled, but the Sichuan troops occupied Badong, Xingshan, and Zigui for a short time. More importantly, Yang Sen took control of Lichuan and Jianshi in October 1921, holding them until February 1923. Yang was strongly involved in the wars of Sichuan, as the forces of Governor Xiong Kewu battled several rivals in an attempt to unify the province. This became important to the peasant rebels because Xiong was gradually defeated in 1923, and his armies moved towards western Hubei. Yang and other strongmen exploited the situation by moving their forces in the opposite direction, trying to crush Xiong's dwindling armies and taking Sichuan for themselves. Although Kong Geng took control of some counties previously occupied by Yang, the removal of many Sichuan troops allowed Lao Yangren's bandit army to invade Yunxian, while the Xingshan County garrison mutinied. With his fortunes declining, Xiong actually allied with the Spirit Soldier factions based at Enshi and Hefeng, and his remaining army moved through the Wu valley in an attempt to link up with them around July 1924. This valley was the most important Spirit Soldier stronghold in Sichuan. However, northern warlord forces under Wang Duqing and Yu Xuezhong as well as Henan troops led by Hu Xiannian were sent to block the way of Xiong's army.

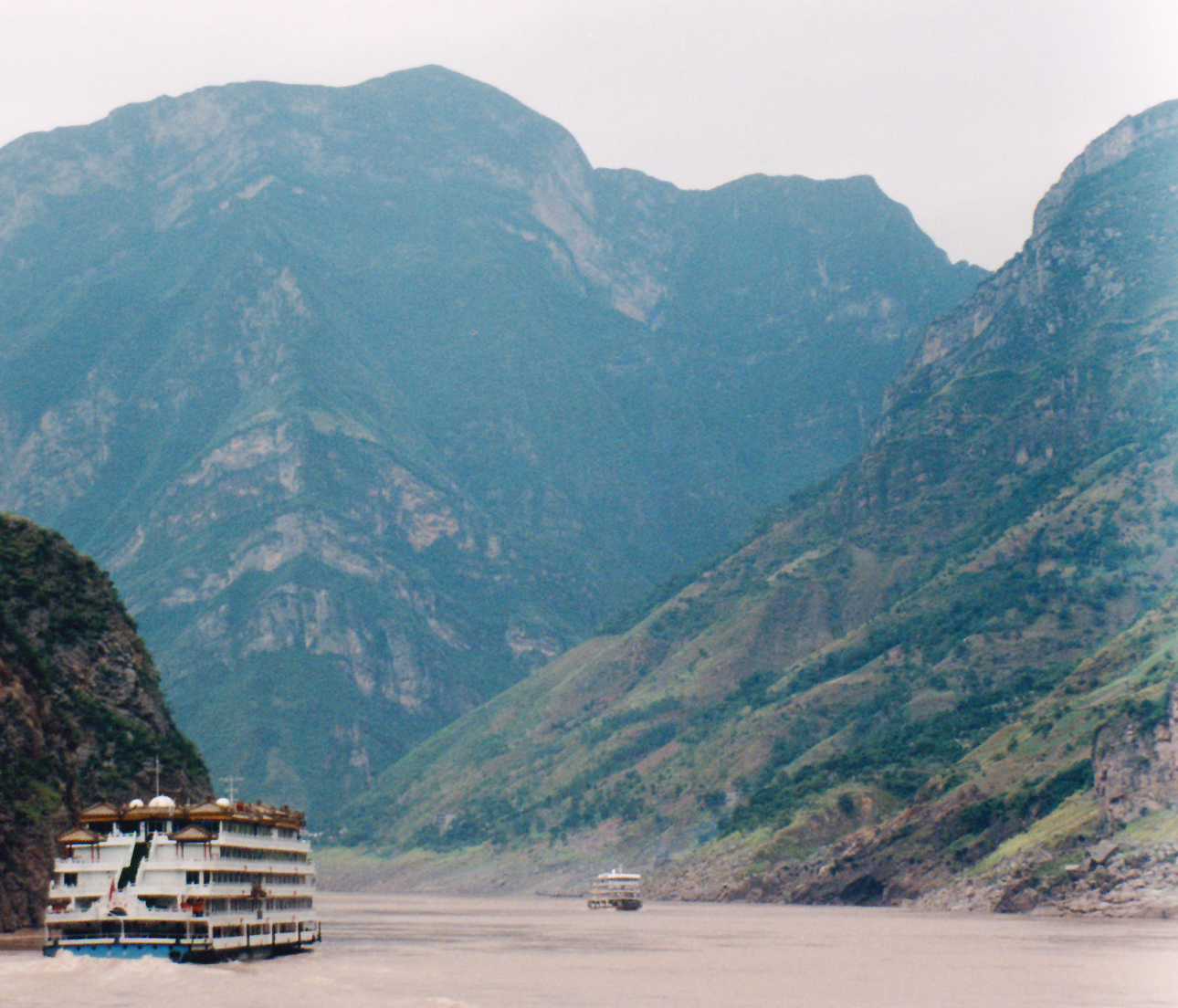
Wu valley, the center of Spirit Soldier activity in Sichuan

The chaotic wars continued in Hubei and Sichuan, as Yang Sen's ascendency to Sichuan's governorship proved short-lived. He provoked several of his previous allies, and was ousted from power in early 1925. He retreated back to Hubei, eventually finding himself in Badong. These clashes once again spilled over into western Hubei, where Guizhou expatriate warlord Yuan Zuming – one of Yang's opponents – moved to Lichuan and Shinan in an attempt to conquer Hefeng. Meanwhile, the Spirit Soldiers spread in eastern Sichuan offering the locals protection from the marauding warlords and bandits. In fact, the peasant rebels managed to win a major victory over warlord troops at Wangying in that year; according to one account, "the river ran red with enemy blood".

Early 1926 marked the Spirit Soldier movement's height, as the rebels counted about 100,000 fighters, and controlled forty counties in Hubei. Despite this, however, the Spirit Soldiers were too disorganized and poorly armed to defend their territories against the three well-trained, well-equipped divisions which the warlords eventually sent against them in 1926. The rebels suffered several crushing defeats in rapid succession, and their leaders were either killed in combat or died of other causes, including suicide or sickness. In consequence, the rebel movement rapidly declined from late 1926 to early 1927, and large numbers of Spirit Soldiers deserted. By this point, however, the situation in the region began to experience a significant change due to the launch of the Northern Expedition in July 1926. This was a major campaign by the Kuomintang (KMT; also known as "Chinese Nationalist Party") to reunite China and defeat the warlord cliques.

== Aftermath ==
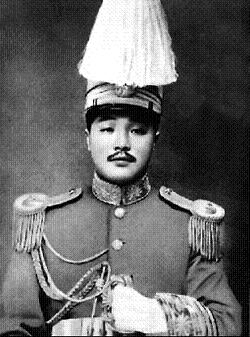
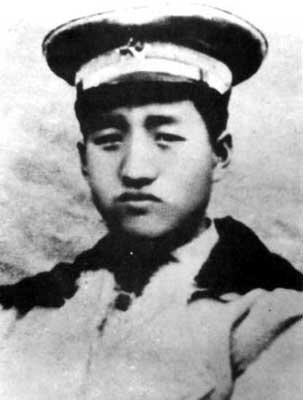
The spirit soldiers eventually fought alongside the Red Armies of He Long (left) and Xu Xiangqian (right)

The Northern Expedition lasted until December 1928, reunified China, and ousted numerous warlords from power. However, several warlords such as Xiong Kewu and Yang Sen allied themselves with the KMT to maintain or regain power. The operation also caused further chaos and great disruption in Hubei and Sichuan which was exploited by various groups such as Lao Yangren whose bandit army had grown to about 20,000 fighters by late 1926. In addition, autonomous village militias, other secret societies such as the Gelaohui and Baijihui, as well as river pirates (huba) were active in the province. However, one major change to the warfare in the region was the introduction of new ideological elements. Many KMT troops which moved through central China were part of the party's left wing or outright Communists. When the KMT's right wing launched a purge against the leftists in the Shanghai massacre of April 1927, a civil war broke out within the KMT. The Chinese Communist Party left the United Front with the KMT, and rebelled. Hubei became one of the major centers of the early Communist insurgency.

By this point, the Spirit Soldier movement still had a significant presence in the region, and Spirit Soldier bands soon allied themselves with the Red Armies of He Long and Xu Xiangqian. Although the Communists regarded secret societies with suspicion as conservative and predatory elements, they presented convenient allies whose aims were at least somewhat compatible with the Left-wing uprising. He Long in particular forged close links with the Spirit Soldiers. (Note: He Long's closeness to various secret societies might have been related to his own membership in one of them, namely the Gelaohui.) He came to view them as "social bandits" who wanted to protect their people. In fact, many Spirit Soldiers actually became part of the Red Armies. As unrest remained high throughout the country, the Spirit Soldier movement also continued to spread on its own, expanding to northern and central Sichuan, western Henan, and eastern Guizhou. Spirit Soldier groups persisted in these regions during the 1930s.

One of the last known Spirit Soldier rebellions took place in February 1959, when the 1,200-strong "Regiment of Spirit Soldiers" launched an anti-Communist uprising at Sizhuang, Henan.

== See also ==
- Chinese salvationist religions
- List of peasant revolts
