= Musée d'ethnographie de Genève =

Ethnographic museum in Geneva (Switzerland)

Geneva Ethnography Museum
- Musée d'ethnographie de Genève

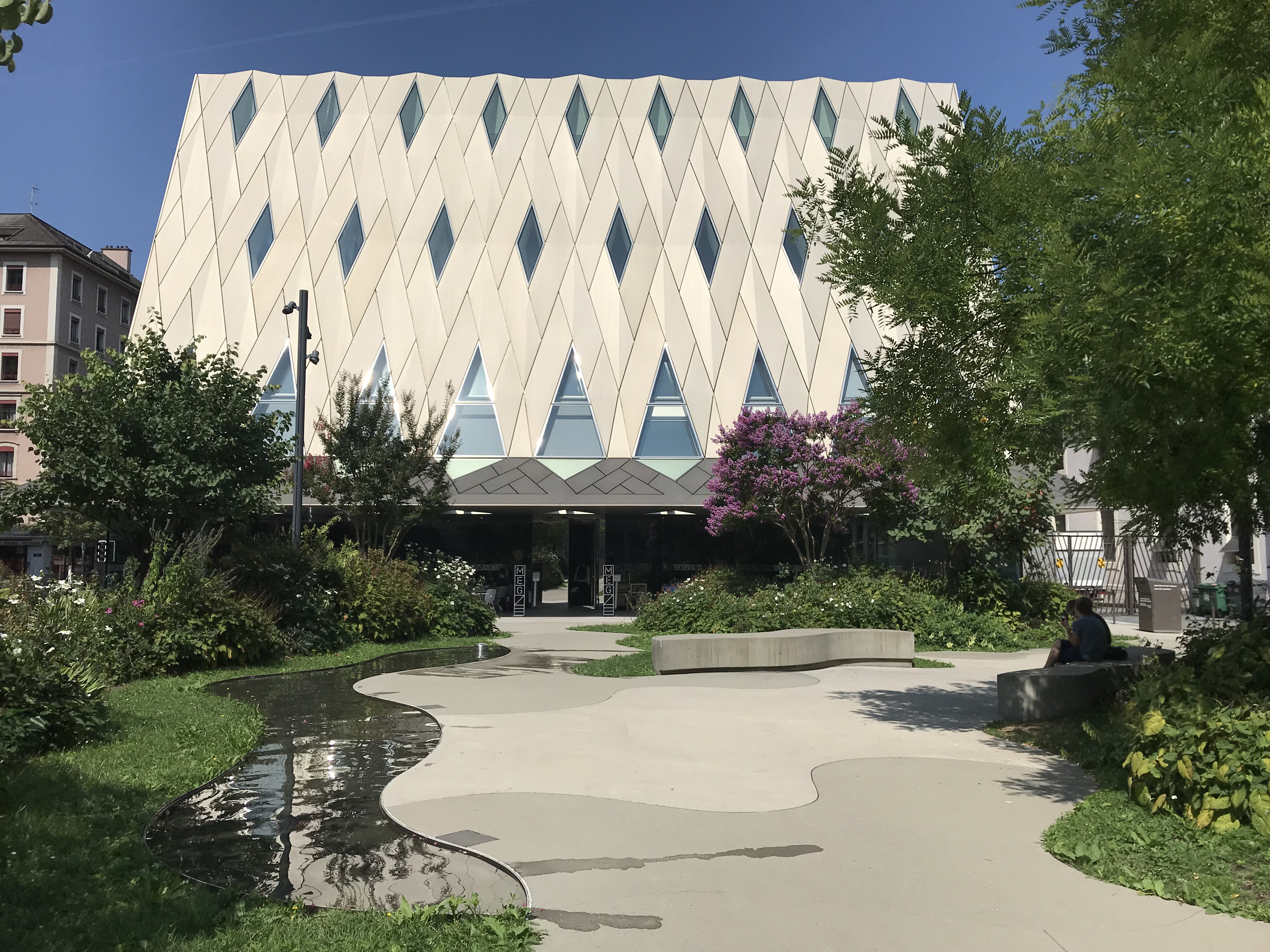
- Façade of the main building
- Interactive fullscreen map
- Established: 25 September 1901; 124 years ago
- Location: Boulevard Carl-Vogt 65; Geneva, GE 1205; Switzerland
- Coordinates: 46.197946°N 6.136959°E
- Type: Ethnographic museum
- Collection size: 75'000+ objects and over 130'000 documents
- Visitors: 114'478 (2024)
- Founder: Eugène Pittard
- Director: Carine Ayélé Durand
- Public transit access: Geneva City Bus: Lines 2 and 19 stop Musée d'ethnographie; lines 1 and 35 stop École-Médecine; Geneva City Tramway: stop Plainpalais
- Website: meg.ch

The Musée d'ethnographie de Genève ("Geneva Ethnography Museum") is one of the most important ethnographic museums in Switzerland.

== History ==
The MEG, or Geneva Museum of Ethnography, was founded on 25 September 1901, on the initiative of Professor Eugène Pittard (1867-1962), who also held the first Chair of Anthropology at the University of Geneva. It was first housed in Mon Repos villa. Pittard brought together public and private collections, mainly the ethnographic collections of the Archaeology Museum and the Musée Ariana, the holdings of the Evangelical Missionary Society Museum and weapons from the Geneva History Museum.

In 1939, the MEG moved into the disused buildings of the Mail primary school in boulevard Carl Vogt. It opened in the new premises on 12 July 1941, sharing the space with the Anthropology Department of the University until 1967. The building was extended in 1949; in 1975 the city bought the Lombard villa in Chêne-Bougeries, which became the Conches annex.

Between 1980 and 2001, three proposals to build a new museum in Sturm Square were rejected. The city then envisaged renovating and extending the building on its present site. The City Council unanimously approved the project on 21 March 2007.

The MEG’s new pagoda-shaped building was opened on 31 October 2014, after four years of construction work. It was designed by Graber Pulver Architekten AG, with ACAU architecture and town planning, in partnership with the civil engineering firm Weber + Brönnimann EG. The galleries and an auditorium are located in the basement; the cafeteria, museum shop and ticket office are on the ground floor, facing the garden. Upstairs are restoration and cultural outreach workshops, as well as the library, which is named after a generous patron, Marie Madeleine Lancoux. The library includes a small space for listening to music from all over the world. The old building has also been renovated and now houses the offices and ethnomusicology workshops. The three buildings in the ensemble - the old museum, the new MEG and a primary school – enclose a small square planted with trees and flowers.

The museum is on the Swiss Inventory of Cultural Property of National and Regional Significance.

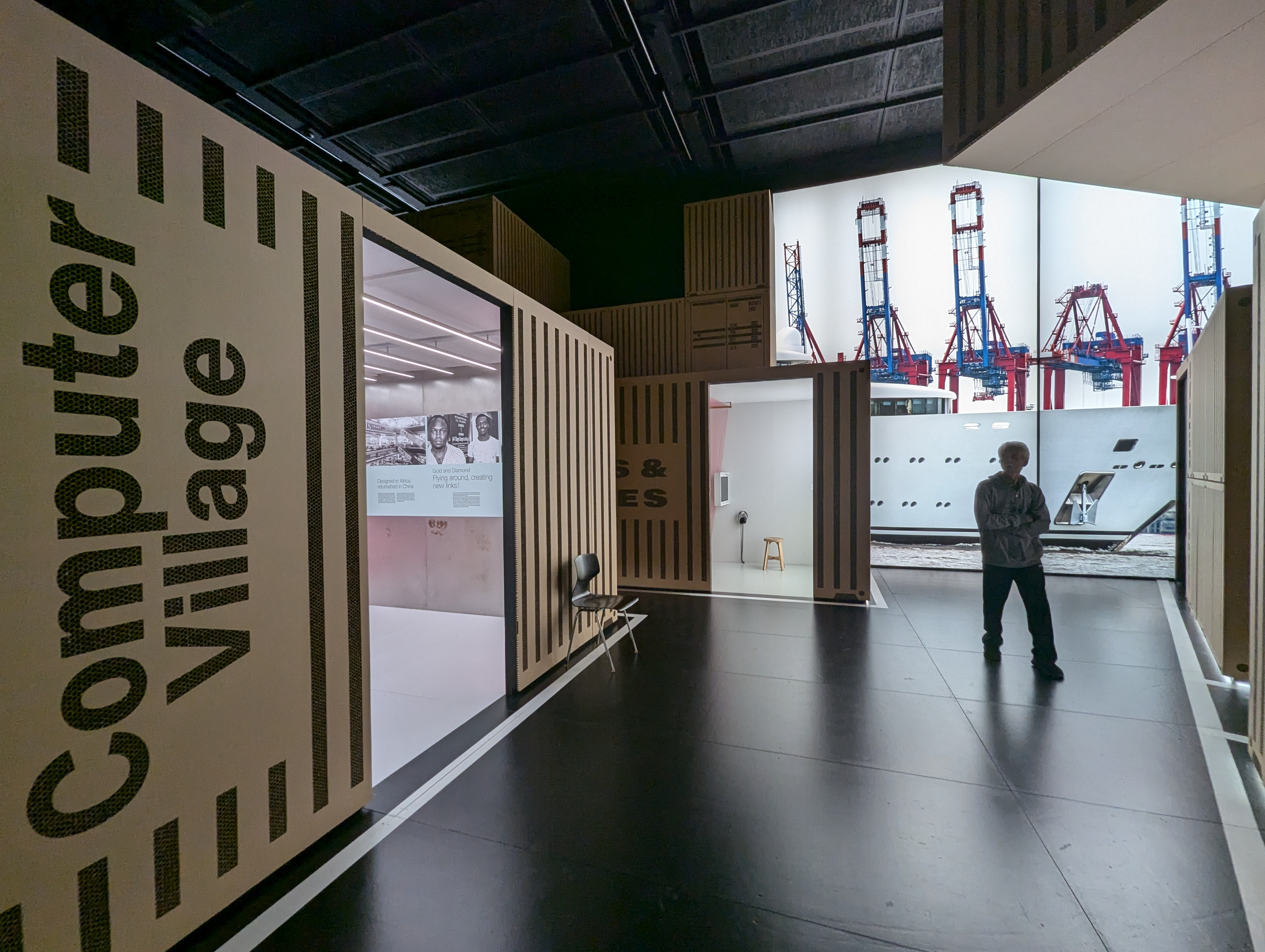
The Cargo Cults Unlimited exhibition at the MEG.

== See also ==
- Ami Butini
- List of museums in Switzerland
- Plainpalais
