= Joss house =

Joss house refers to a type of Chinese temple architecture, and it may refer to:

== Buildings ==
- Auburn Joss House in Auburn, California, U.S.; NRHP-listed
- Mendocino Joss House in Mendocino, California, U.S.; CHL-listed
- Weaverville Joss House State Historic Park in Weaverville, California, U.S.; CHL-listed
- Bendigo Joss House, in Victoria, Australia

== Places ==
- Joss House Bay in Hong Kong, China

== See also ==
- Joss (Chinese statue), Chinese religious statue
- Joss paper, paper made into burnt offerings in Chinese culture
- Joss (disambiguation)
