= Van der Vegt =

Van der Vegt is a Dutch toponymic surname meaning "from/of the (river) Vecht". For most families, "Vecht" refers to the Overijsselse Vecht. At least one family is known to be named after the Utrechtse Vecht. Among variants are Van der Vecht and Van de(r) Vegte. People with the surname include:

- Anna van der Vegt (1903–1983), Dutch gymnast
- Henry van der Vegt (born 1972), Dutch footballer
- Jacobus van der Vecht (1906–1992), Dutch entomologist
- Jos van der Vegt (born 1953), Dutch businessman
- Rebecca van der Vegt (born 1964), New Zealand women's soccer player
