= Jean-François Butini =

Genevan lawyer, prosecutor general and politician (1747–1805)

- Born: January 9, 1747; Geneva, Republic of Geneva
- Died: November 21, 1805 (aged 58); Geneva, Léman, French Empire
- Occupations: Lawyer, Prosecutor General, Politician, Writer
- Known for: Lettres africaines (1771), Abolitionist writings
- Parent(s): Jacob Butini; Susanne Adrienne Françoise Rocca
- Relatives: Ami Butini (relative)

Jean-François Butini (9 January 1747 – 21 November 1805) was a Genevan lawyer, prosecutor general, and politician who became notable for his early abolitionist writings. A member of an established Protestant family with numerous local notables, Butini combined a legal and political career with literary pursuits that reflected Enlightenment ideals.

== Early life and education ==
A citizen of the Republic of Geneva, Jean-François Butini was born into an ancient Protestant family that counted numerous local notables among its members. His father, Jacob Butini, was a merchant and member of the Council of Two Hundred, while his mother, Susanne Adrienne Françoise Rocca, was the daughter of a pastor. Butini received his education at the college and then at the Academy of Geneva, where he studied letters and philosophy.

== Career ==
=== Legal profession ===
Butini built his career in the judicial system, becoming a lawyer in 1769. He was appointed prosecutor general twice, in 1782 and 1791. In 1796, he co-authored a draft civil code project, contributing to legal reform efforts in the republic.

=== Political involvement ===
His political career began with his election to the Council of Two Hundred in 1775. Following the Genevan revolution of 1792, Butini served in the National Assembly in 1793, and later held positions in the Committee and Legislative Council in 1794 and 1795. He also served as castellan of Peney in 1777, and subsequently of Saint-Victor and Chapitre in 1779. Historical records indicate that Butini never married and left no descendants.

== Literary work and abolitionist thought ==
=== Lettres africaines ===
In 1771, Butini published an epistolary novel titled Lettres africaines; ou histoire de Phédima et d'Abensar (African Letters; or the story of Phédima and Abensar) in London, distributed in Paris by Nicolas-Augustin Delalain. Long forgotten, this work has recently attracted attention from historians for its early abolitionist themes.

The novel presents a love story between two young people set in an imaginary West African setting, whose destiny is destroyed when they become dehumanized victims of the Atlantic slave trade. The originality of this fiction lies in its incorporation of a detailed plan for the emancipation of enslaved people within the narrative structure.

=== Abolitionist philosophy ===
Butini's abolitionist project, notably developed despite his family connection to Ami Butini, a slave plantation owner, aimed to demonstrate that emancipation would benefit masters, colonial and metropolitan states, as well as the enslaved themselves. His argument centered on practical considerations: liberating enslaved people would prevent revolts that disrupted colonial production and threatened the lives of masters and the minority white population. Emancipated individuals would become faithful defenders of the colonies rather than dangerous enemies.

The economic dimension of his proposal suggested that freed, salaried Black workers would constitute a new market for metropolitan export industries. However, Butini's plan viewed the primary advantage for enslaved people not as gaining freedom or restored human dignity, but as increased life expectancy through reduced mortality rates. This perspective reflected an emancipation viewed through the lens of masters' interests, who would be relieved of the repeated and expensive purchases of captives taken from Africa.

=== Radical and conservative elements ===
Butini's program contained a paradoxical mixture of radicalism and conservatism. Unlike most abolitionists of his era who envisioned a gradual exit from slavery, with future freed people required to purchase their freedom by working several years without compensation for their masters, Butini conceived of abolition as immediate and unconditional. On this point, he was unquestionably ahead of his time.

Conversely, he aligned with the well-populated category of abolitionist defenders of colonialism. He was convinced that to preserve the class advantages that the colonial system reserved for them, white elites had every interest in renouncing part of their absolutism by embracing the abolitionist cause.

== Works ==
- Lettres africaines; ou histoire de Phédima et d'Abensar (1771)
- Projet de code civil, précédé d'un rapport lu au Conseil législatif (with others, 1796)

== Bibliography ==
- Charara, Youmna (ed.): Fictions coloniales du XVIIIe siècle. Ziméo. Lettres africaines. Adonis, ou le bon nègre, anecdote coloniale, 2005, pp. 79–170.
- Etemad, Bouda: De Rousseau à Dunant. La colonisation et l'esclavage vus de Genève, 2022, pp. 20–33.
