= Jos (disambiguation) =

Jos is a city in Nigeria.

Jos or JOS may also refer to:

== In Nigeria ==
- Jos Plateau, in the centre of Nigeria
- Anglican Diocese of Jos
- Anglican Province of Jos
- Roman Catholic Archdiocese of Jos
- University of Jos
- Yakubu Gowon Airport, also called Jos Airport, serving the city of Jos

== People ==
- Jos (given name), a list of people with either the given name or with the nickname

== Other uses ==
- 84340 Jos, a main-belt asteroid
- JOS Watergraafsmeer, a Dutch football club
- Jos Nosy-Bé, a football club based in Nosy Be, Madagascar
- Joy of Satan Ministries, a religious group
- jos, ISO 639-3 code for the Levantine Arabic Sign Language
- J OS, the former name for TempleOS

== See also ==
- Joss (disambiguation)
- Joos (disambiguation)
