= Joss =

Joss may refer to:

== People ==
- Joss (name), including a list of people with the name
- Joss., taxonomic author abbreviation of Marcel Josserand (1900–1992), a French mycologist

== Places ==
- Joss Bay, Thanet, Kent, England, UK; a bay
- Joss Pass, British Columbia, Canada; a mountain pass

== Ritual ==
- Joss (Chinese statue), a religious object
- Joss house (disambiguation)
- Joss paper, a type of burnt offering
- Joss stick, a form of incense

== Other uses ==
- JOSS (JOHNNIAC Open Shop System), a time-sharing programming language
- Joss JP1, an Australian-built supercar
- Abbreviation for the Journal of Open Source Software

== See also ==
- Joe (disambiguation)
- Jos (disambiguation)
- Joseph (disambiguation)
