= IUS =

Ius or IUS may refer to:

== Education ==
- Indiana University Southeast, an American campus
- International Union of Students, a global association of student unions
- International University of Sarajevo, Bosnia and Herzegovina
- Inter-University Seminar on Armed Forces and Society, for military sociology research

== Law and government ==
- Ius, a right afforded to ancient Romans
- Ius (canon law), a Roman Catholic custom
- Innovation Union Scoreboard, an EU comparator of innovation by member states

== Science and technology ==
- Inertial Upper Stage, a two-stage booster rocket
- Interactive Unix, an operating system port
- Intrauterine system, a contraceptive device

== See also ==
- IU (disambiguation)
- Jus (disambiguation)
