= Biotherm =

French luxury skin care company

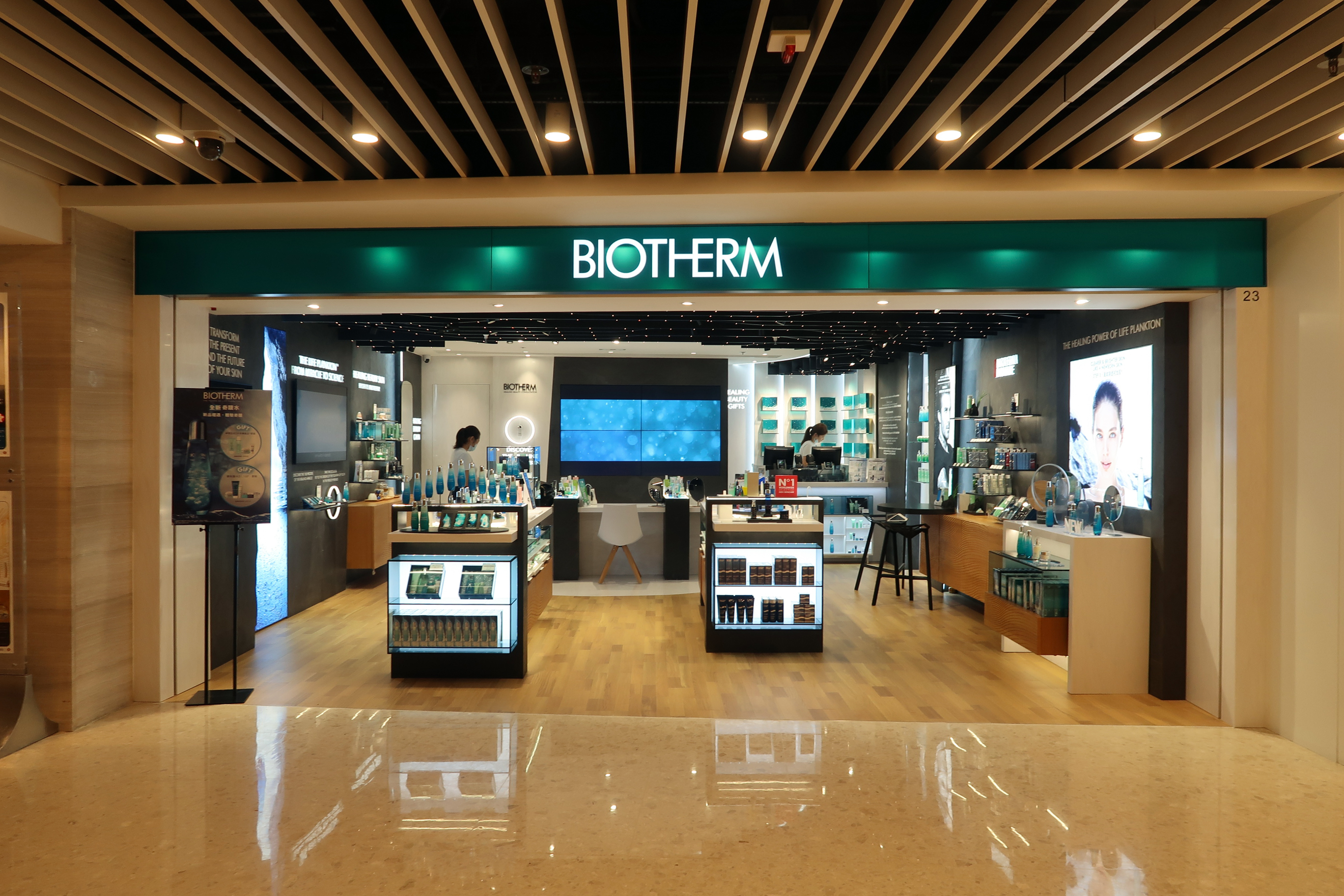
Biotherm store in Citylink Plaza, Hong Kong

Biotherm is a French skin care company owned by L'Oréal. Biotherm was acquired by L'Oréal in 1970.

In the early 20th century, the French doctor Jos Jullien discovered mineral thermal spring waters under Pyrenees mountain in the southern part of France which contained thermal plankton, supposedly a key to healthy skin and a potent skin rejuvenator. In 1952, intellectual property rights were acquired and he used it in skin care products. Thus, therm in Biotherm comes from thermal plankton, an ingredient found in all Biotherm products. Bio comes from the profession of the founder biologist.

== History ==
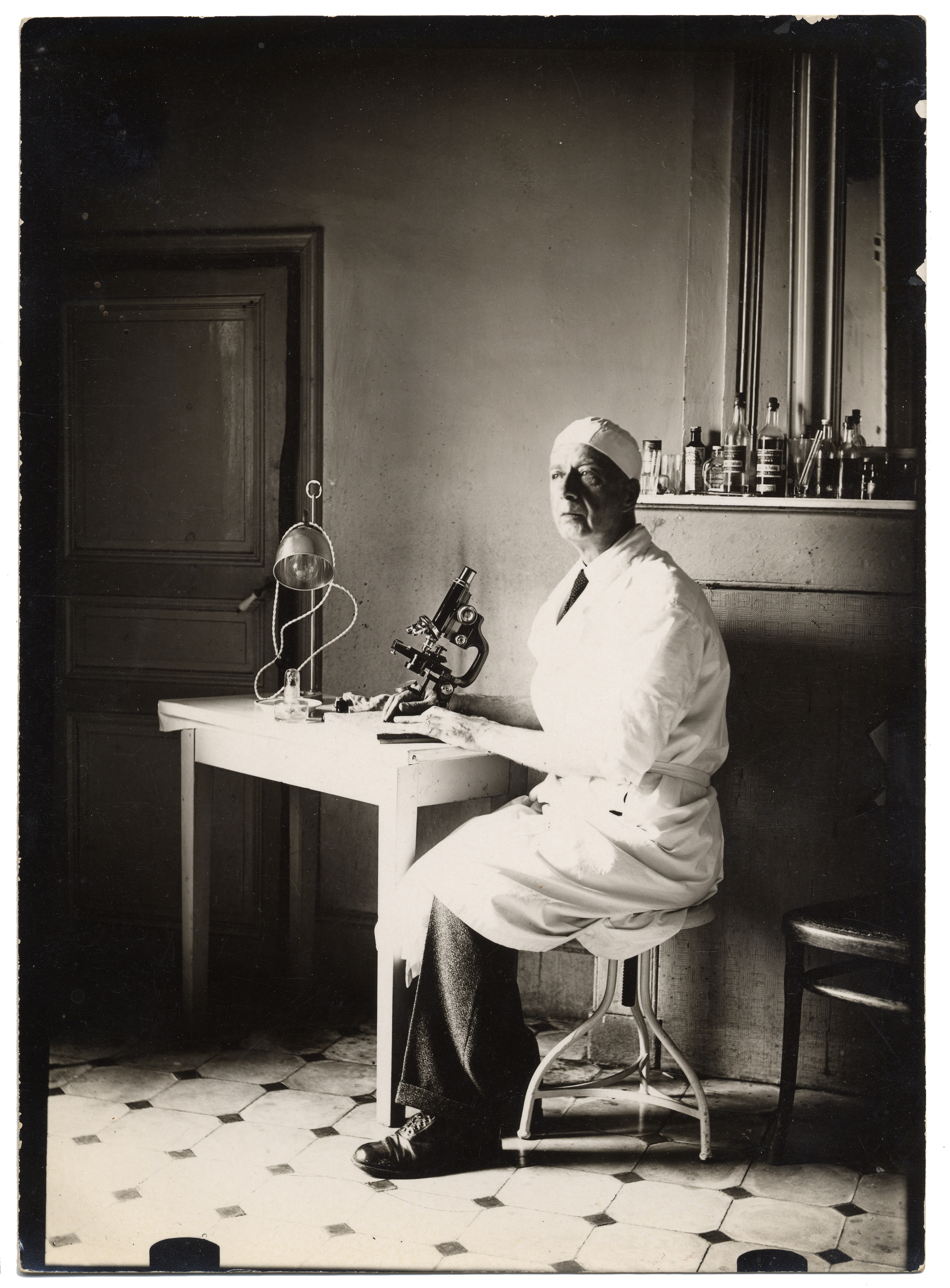
Jos Jullien in his laboratory, 1940.

In the years 1940–50, Dr. Jos Jullien, from Joyeuse in Ardeche (France), noticed the presence of a particular substance on the surface of the thermal waters of Molitg-les-Bains. This substance is composed of thermal plankton. With Jeanine Marissal, he worked on the potentials of this substance that could be integrated towards creating a cosmetic formula. Biotherm was born from this work in 1952, under the leadership of Adrien Barthélémy, owner of the Molitg-les-Bains springs. In 1952, Biotherm launched 3 products: La Crème Triple-Usage, Biotherm Cure and Biomains. Biomains, a hand moisturizing cream, is still on the market today.

During the 1960s the brand developed several targeted skincare solutions to address specific needs, including its first sun cream and its first "slimming cream". In 1968, Biotherm introduces Bio-Buste Suractive on the market, its first "breast firming cream".

Biotherm was acquired by L'Oréal in 1970.

In 2014, Leighton Meester was appointed as the new global spokesperson for the skin care brand Biotherm.

In 2016 David Fridlevski became president of the brand.

In 2022, Gregory Benoit was appointed brand president, becoming the youngest person ever holding this position within the L'Oréal Luxe division.

In 2024, after Nicholas Hoult, it's American actor David Corenswet who becomes brand ambassador for the men skincare line. In 2026, Hungarian model Barbara Palvin was chosen as the face of the new Biotherm Aquasource+ Electrolyte Dewy Gel campaign.
