= Bernhard Joos (died 1855) =

Swiss politician and judge (1793–1855)

- Born: 2 July 1793; Schaffhausen, Old Swiss Confederacy
- Died: 19 September 1855 (aged 62); Schaffhausen, Switzerland
- Occupations: Politician; judge
- Spouse: Ursula Louise Freuler (m. 1819)
- Children: Wilhelm Joos; Emil Joos
- Parents: Johann Rudolf Joos (father); Maria Barbara Ritz (mother)

Bernhard Joos (2 July 1793 – 19 September 1855) was a Swiss politician and judge from Schaffhausen. He was a member of the cantonal parliament from 1818 to 1843 and from 1847 to 1851, of the cantonal government from 1837 to 1839, and president of the cantonal court from 1839 to 1851. After the separation of the city and the canton in 1831 he was the first president of the city parliament. In 1835 he was the first to propose a water-power plant on the Rhine near Schaffhausen.

== Biography ==
Bernhard Joos was born on 2 July 1793 in Schaffhausen, the son of Johann Rudolf Joos, a judge (Urteilsprecher), and Maria Barbara Ritz. He came from a wealthy family of stocking manufacturers. In 1819 he married Ursula Louise Freuler, daughter of Johann Jakob Freuler, a deacon and professor. He was the father of the physicians and politicians Wilhelm Joos and Emil Joos.

Joos was a member of the cantonal parliament (Kantonsrat) of Schaffhausen from 1818 to 1843 and from 1847 to 1851. He was clerk of the council (Ratsschreiber) from 1825 to 1831, the canton's envoy to the Federal Diet (Tagsatzung) in 1832, a member of the constitutional council (Verfassungsrat) in 1834, and a member of the cantonal government (Regierungsrat) from 1837 to 1839. When the city and the canton of Schaffhausen were separated in 1831, he sat on the commission that divided their property (Ausscheidungskommission), and from 1831 to 1839 he was the first president of the city parliament (Grosser Stadtrat). From 1834 to 1836 he was a member of the city executive (Stadtrat).

Joos also held several judicial offices: in 1831 he was clerk of the cantonal court (Kantonsgerichtsschreiber), from 1832 to 1837 public prosecutor (Staatsanwalt, Fiskal), and from 1839 to 1851 president of the cantonal court. He was regarded as a visionary politician who looked for a way out of the economic depression, and in 1835 he was the first to propose a water-power plant on the Rhine near Schaffhausen. He died in Schaffhausen on 19 September 1855.

== Bibliography ==
- E. Joos, Parteien und Presse im Kanton Schaffhausen, 1975
- Schaffhauser Kantonsgeschichte des 19. und 20. Jahrhunderts, vol. 1, p. 294

=== Archives ===
- Schaffhausen City Archives (Stadtarchiv Schaffhausen): genealogical register of the city of Schaffhausen
