= JWS =

JWS may refer to:

- Jackson–Weiss syndrome
- Java Web Start
- Java Web Services Development Pack
- John Wesley Shipp, American actor
- John Woolman School, in Nevada City, California
- Journal of Web Semantics
- JSON Web Signature
- Just Women's Sports
- Whitfords railway station, in Western Australia

== See also ==
- Jehovah's Witnesses
