= Eugène Pittard =

Eugène Pittard (1867–1962) was a Swiss anthropologist notable for his work Les Races et l'Histoire published in 1924.

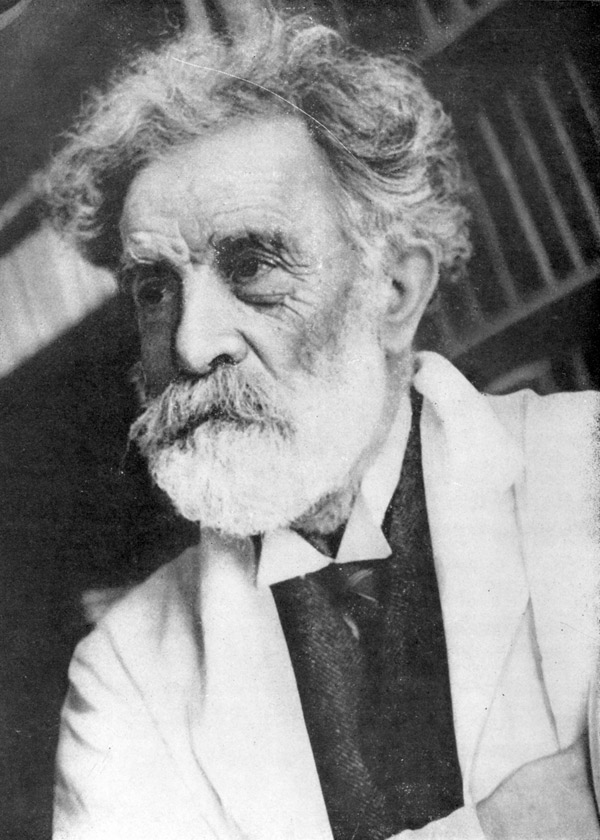
Eugène Pittard

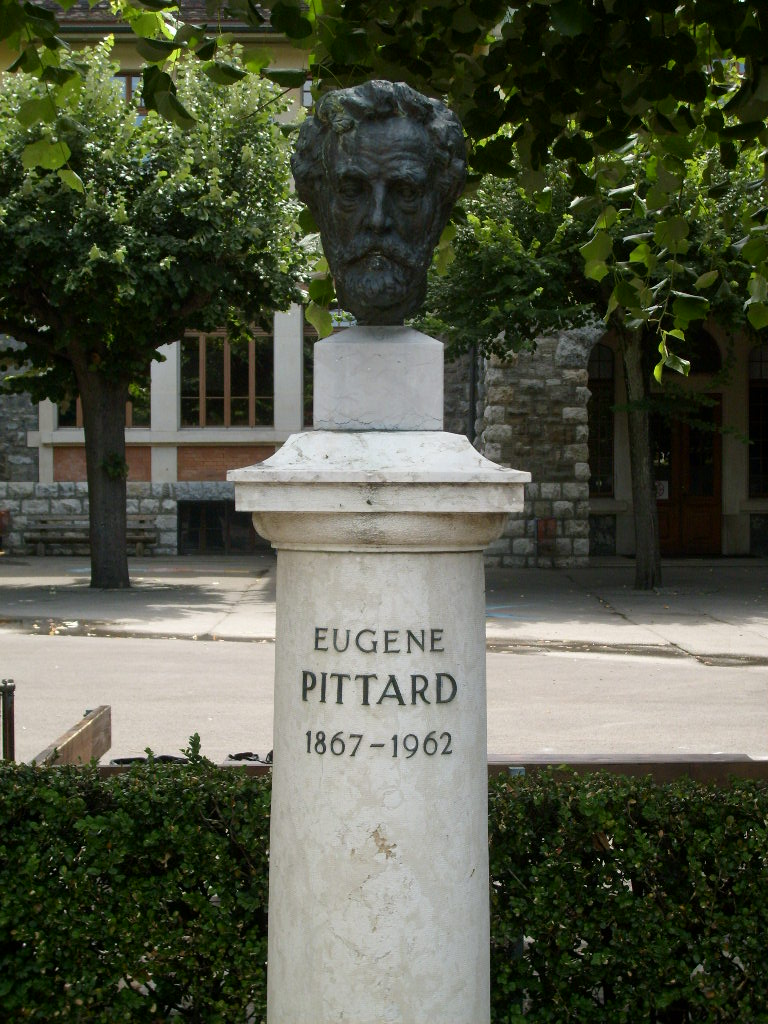
The bust of Eugène Pittard at the University of Geneva's Museum of Ethnography.

== Early life ==
Pittard was born in Plainpalais, Geneva, on June 5, 1867. Even as a child, Pittard showed a predilection for collecting and observing people and artifacts. He had a small collection consisting of fossils, bones and coins, which he hoped to some day submit to Carl Vogt.

== Teaching career ==
Pittard founded the Museum of Ethnography at the University of Geneva. He was also the first chair of anthropology at the university. Later, he was appointed to the post of rector of the academy. Apart from his various positions and roles in the University of Geneva, he was also the project manager for the League of Nations. He was also one of the stalwarts of the Albanian Red Cross.

== Anthropology ==
Pittard's fascination with anthropology began during a stay in Paris. It was followed by a doctoral thesis on anthropology in 1898. Although Pittard was a popular teacher and charismatic personality in the lecture rooms, he is most remembered as a scientist. The crux of his thesis involved an extensive study of the skulls recovered from the ossuaries in Valais. But he was also deeply interested in the ancient people of the Balkans. This particular interest of led to his fascination with the Gypsies. His work and findings in these areas of study, and their subsequent publication, catapulted him to the higher echelons of the anthropological sphere. A seminal anthropologist, his biggest contribution to anthropology is regarded as the perspective he expounded of studying humans in their entirety, as more than biological creatures.

Pittard was also of the opinion that the descriptive methods in vogue during his times were ineffective in the study of humans. He also stated that the anthropometric approach and that of race as fundamental basis of research were useless in studying and describing human beings. He published his research findings in a book in 1924, entitled Races and History.

Nearly two decades before the Second World War began and the Nazi propaganda for the need to preserve a pure breed of people, Pittard had declared that there wasn't a pure breed of people in Europe. This was a claim at that time, since Pittard was speculating, albeit based on his vast experience of studying people. But when genetics developed significantly in the 1960s, it came to be known that Pittard had been right.

== Recognition and awards ==
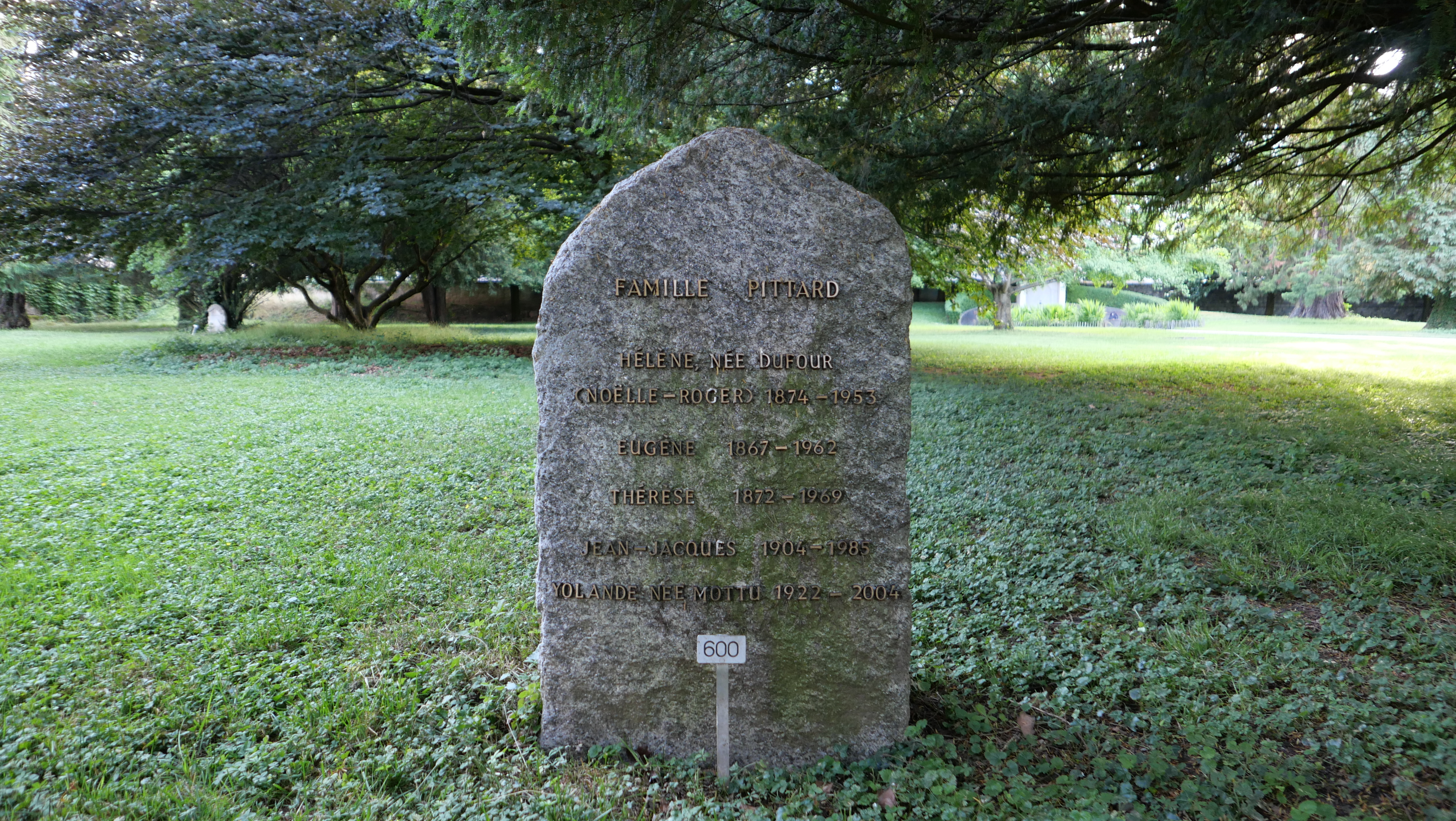
The family grave at the Cimetière des Rois in Geneva

Pittard was an honorary member of, or corresponding to, scientific societies in Paris, Stockholm, Rome, Berlin, and London. He had a distaste for decorations and awards: he is reported to have kept his awards in a bottom drawer amid miscellaneous items.
