= Wilhelm Joos =

Swiss politician (1821–1900)

- Born: 1 April 1821; Schaffhausen, Switzerland
- Died: 6 November 1900 (aged 79); Schaffhausen, Switzerland
- Occupations: Physician, politician
- Father: Bernhard Joos
- Relatives: Emil Joos (brother)

Wilhelm Joos (1 April 1821 – 6 November 1900) was a Swiss physician and politician from Schaffhausen. He was a member of the National Council from 1863 to 1900. In response to rural overpopulation and unemployment in Switzerland he promoted regulated emigration overseas rather than industrialization, and in 1864 he proposed in the National Council that Swiss slaveholders in Brazil be punished. He also campaigned for child protection, shorter working hours and a Swiss bank of issue, and supported the nationalization of the railways.

== Biography ==
Wilhelm Joos was born on 1 April 1821 in Schaffhausen, the son of Bernhard Joos. He did not marry. He studied medicine in Erlangen, Göttingen, Berlin, London and Vienna. In 1848 he worked as a physician in Paris during the February Revolution and traveled from there to Algiers. Later the same year he left for Brazil, where he practiced medicine in the provinces of Pernambuco and Bahia. From 1852 he traveled with his brother Emil Joos in Colombia, Ecuador and Peru. He had a dental practice in Bogotá, and in 1853–1855 he worked as an itinerant doctor during the Colombian revolution. From 1857 he traveled in Egypt, Palestine and Turkey.

Back in Schaffhausen, Joos ran a medical practice. In politics he was an independent loner (Einzelgänger), close to the Democratic movement and later to social democratic ideas. He was a member of the cantonal parliament (Kantonsrat) from 1858 to 1900, of the city executive (Stadtrat) in 1862–1863, of the National Council from 1863 to 1900 and of the city parliament (Grossstadtrat) from 1877 to 1900.

In response to rural overpopulation and unemployment in Switzerland, Joos promoted regulated emigration overseas rather than industrialization. In 1860 he concluded a preliminary agreement with the government of Costa Rica for Switzerland to take over government land, and he tried in vain to win the Swiss Society for Public Utility (Schweizerische Gemeinnützige Gesellschaft) for the plan. In 1871 he campaigned, again without success, for the Federal Council to accept gifts of land in Tennessee. In 1864, before slavery was prohibited in the United States, he proposed in the National Council that Swiss slaveholders in Brazil be punished.

From 1867 Joos campaigned for child protection, against the hiring out of children (Verdingung), and for a limit of 10 hours a day and 60 hours a week. From 1871 to 1874 he fought in vain for a federal power to regulate emigration to be included in the federal constitution. From 1872 he called for a Swiss bank of issue (Notenbank) and launched popular initiatives for it with signature sheets, before the right of initiative had been regulated at federal level. Joos supported the introduction of the alcohol monopoly in 1885, the nationalization of the railways, until then private, in 1886, and the introduction of a direct federal tax in 1899. He was a visionary politician whose ideas were often ahead of their time. He died in Schaffhausen on 6 November 1900.

== Bibliography ==
- A. Steinegger, "Dr. Wilhelm Joos, Nationalrat", in Schaffhauser Beiträge zur Geschichte 34, 1957, 77–95
- E. Joos, "Auf den Spuren von Wilhelm und Emil Joos in Kolumbien", in Schaffhauser Mappe 50, 1982, 37–43
- S. Brunner-Hauser, Pionier für eine menschlichere Zukunft, 1983
