= Huron County Memorial Airport =

Airport in Michigan, US

- IATA: none; ICAO: KBAX; FAA LID: BAX

Summary
- Airport type: Public
- Owner: Huron County Road Commission
- Serves: Bad Axe, Michigan
- Elevation AMSL: 763 ft (233 m)
- Coordinates: 43°46′49″N 082°59′08″W

Map
- Location of airport in Michigan BAX (the United States)

Runways
Direction	Length		Surface
Direction	ft	m	Surface
4/22	3,495	1,065	Asphalt
17/35	5,009	1,527	Asphalt

Statistics (2021)
- Aircraft operations: 8,400
- Based aircraft: 22
- Source: Federal Aviation Administration

Huron County Memorial Airport (ICAO: KBAX, FAA LID: BAX) is a county-owned, public-use airport located one nautical mile (1.85 km) south of the central business district of Bad Axe, a city in Huron County, Michigan, United States. It is included in the Federal Aviation Administration (FAA) National Plan of Integrated Airport Systems for 2017–2021, in which it is categorized as a local general aviation facility.

Although many U.S. airports use the same three-letter location identifier for the FAA and IATA, this airport is assigned BAX by the FAA and no designation from the IATA (which assigned BAX to Barnaul Airport in Barnaul, Altai Krai, Russia).

The airport is occasionally used during military training exercises or as a stopover point for restored aircraft transiting to airshows. The airport hosts regular open houses allowing residents to tour airport facilities, experience various aircraft, and more.

After the COVID-19 pandemic began, the airport saw a number of upgrades, including a runway upgrade that completed in mid 2021.

== Facilities and aircraft ==
Huron County Memorial Airport covers an area of 386 acres (156 ha) at an elevation of 763 feet (233 m) above mean sea level. It has two asphalt paved runways: 17/35 is 5,009 by 75 feet (1,527 x 23 m) and 4/22 is 3,495 by 75 feet (1,065 x 23 m).

The airport has an FBO offering fuel and other services.

For the 12-month period ending December 31, 2021, the airport had 8,400 general aviation aircraft operations, an average of 23 per day. At that time there were 22 aircraft based at this airport: 21 single-engine airplanes and 1 jet.

== Accidents and incidents ==
- On October 5, 1998, a Piper PA-28 Cherokee was destroyed when it impacted power lines northeast of the Huron County Memorial Airport while approaching the airport. Witnesses reported the aircraft made a normal traffic pattern entry and flew an expected course, but the aircraft remained roughly 75–100 feet above the ground. After impacting the power lines, the aircraft impacted the ground and cartwheeled before coming to a stop. The probable cause of the crash was found to be the pilot's failure to maintain adequate altitude/clearance from the wires.
- On August 14, 2000, an Ayres A2R-600 was destroyed after impacting terrain while maneuvering near the airport. The aircraft was applying aerial application when the left wing dropped, nose dropped, and the aircraft spun to the left. No change in apparent engine operation was reported by witnesses. The probable cause of the accident was an inadvertent stall/spin, with low altitude contributing.
- On July 23, 2018, an Aeros Venture experimental aircraft crashed after departing from Huron County. Witnesses reported that the plane entered a spiraling, descending turn while maneuvering towards a road. Though the plane's wings leveled momentarily, the plane became inverted and impacted trees near the road. The sole pilot onboard was killed.

== See also ==
- List of airports in Michigan
