= BA-X =

BA-X is a labour market index published since January 2007 by the German Federal Employment Agency (Bundesagentur für Arbeit [BA]).

== Description ==
The BA-X is a labour market index published monthly by the Bundesagentur für Arbeit (BA). The index tracks the demand for manpower in the primary labor market.

The BA-X is based on concrete openings for jobs at business establishments and not on surveys or assessments. Information on all non-promoted jobs that are known to the BA are included in the index. In addition to the non-promoted jobs that are reported to the BA, there are jobs for freelancers and the self-employed; jobs reported by private recruitment agencies; and additional jobs from the BA Job Exchange as well as from the BA Job Robot. The BA has knowledge of far more than half of the total job opportunities on the primary labour market in Germany. Hence, the BA has a very broad foundation and provides a representative snapshot of the German job market.

== Concept ==
All components for the calculation of the jobs known to the BA have only been available in full since 2004. The BA-X therefore begins with 2004 as the baseline year at an index level of 100. The BA-X is seasonally adjusted, and consequently, typical seasonal fluctuations are suppressed. The BA-X is an early indicator of the economic situation and a measurement of the actual employment climate in German business establishments. The BA-X is released monthly on the day before the monthly press conference.
