= Jos Seckel =

Dutch artist

- Born: Joseph Abraham Seckel; 23 December 1881; Rotterdam, Netherlands
- Died: 3 March 1945 (aged 63); Bezuidenhout, The Hague, German-occupied Netherlands

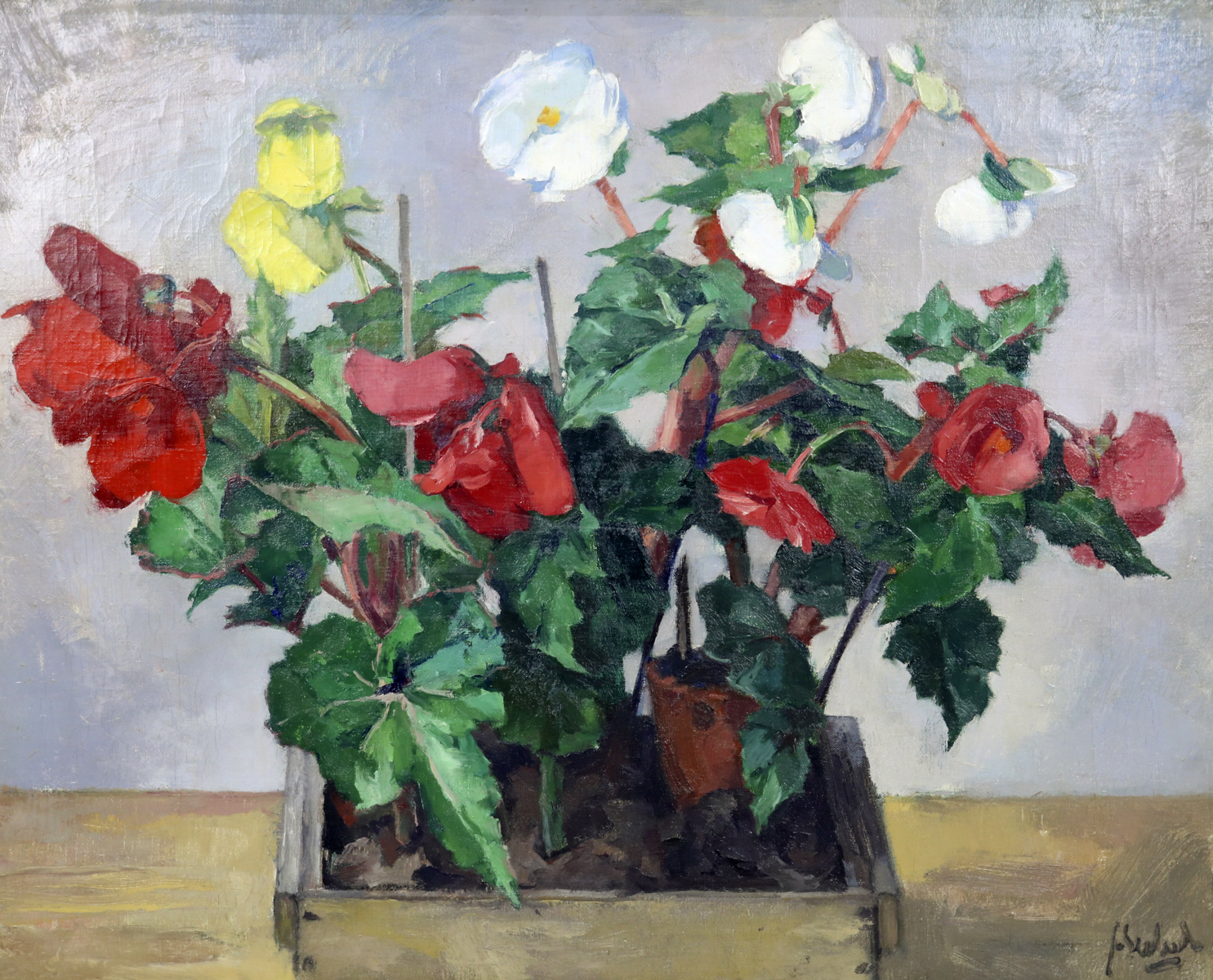
Flowering begonias plants in a wooden box

Joseph Abraham Seckel (23 December 1881 – 3 March 1945) was a Dutch artist. His work was exhibited in the art competitions at the 1928 and 1932 Summer Olympics. His work was included in the 1939 exhibition and sale Onze Kunst van Heden (Our Art of Today) at the Rijksmuseum in Amsterdam. Seckel and his family died during the Bezuidenhout bombardment on 3 March 1945.
