= Joos (given name) =

Joos is a given name. Notable people with the given name include:

- Joos Ambühl (born 1959), Swiss cross country skier
- Joos de Beer (died 1591), Early Netherlandish painter
- Joos van Ghistele (c. 1446–c. 1525), Flemish nobleman
- Joos de Momper (1564–1635), Flemish landscape painter
- Joos van Cleve (c. 1485 – 1540/1541), Flemish painter
- Joos van Craesbeeck (c. 1605/06– c. 1660), Flemish baker and painter
- Joos van Winghe (1544–1603), Flemish Renaissance painter
- Joos Valgaeren (born 1976), Belgian international professional footballer

== See also ==
- Joos (surname)
