= Ami Butini =

18th-century Genevan plantation owner and ethnographic collector in Suriname

- Born: Bénédict-Ami Butini; May 21, 1718; Geneva, Republic of Geneva
- Died: 1780; Paramaribo, Suriname
- Occupations: Plantation owner, legal advisor, ethnographic collector
- Parent(s): Augustin Butini (father); Marthe de l'Escale (mother)
- Relatives: Jean-François Butini (relative)

Ami Butini (born Bénédict-Ami Butini; 21 May 1718 – 1780) was a Genevan plantation owner and ethnographic collector who lived in Suriname during the 18th century. He is notable for being one of the few Swiss plantation owners to personally manage his slave-operated estate and for his significant contributions to early ethnographic collections in Geneva.

== Early life and education ==
Ami Butini was born on 21 May 1718 in Geneva, the second of eight children born to Augustin Butini and Marthe de l'Escale. Five of his siblings died in infancy. His father worked as a cloth merchant and later served as secretary of the French Exchange.

Butini pursued his education at the Academy of Geneva, where he studied philosophy and theology. He completed his theological thesis in 1743, following the Protestant tradition of his family.

== Life in Suriname ==
In the early 1750s, Butini left Geneva and settled in Paramaribo, Suriname, to manage a plantation he had inherited. The plantation, named Tulpenberg, was located along a tributary of the Commewijne River. In 1753, he married in the Dutch colony, though the identity of his wife remains unknown. Historical records suggest that Johanna Magdalena Buttini or Butini, born to a Black mother, may have been his daughter. Between approximately 1789 and 1807, she had at least 16 children with Dutch plantation owner Pieter Louis Berkhoff.

Butini was among the rare Swiss plantation owners who chose to personally oversee their slave-operated estates rather than managing them from Europe. In addition to running his plantation, he served as a legal advisor in Paramaribo. Despite his prominence, no surviving records indicate the size of Tulpenberg plantation, the number of enslaved people who worked there, the crops cultivated, or its profitability.

== Ethnographic collecting ==
From the time of his arrival in Suriname, Butini developed a passion for collecting objects that fascinated him from the local cultures. During a visit to Geneva in 1759, he donated a significant collection of "exotic" objects to the city's public library (now the Bibliothèque de Genève), enriching its cabinet of curiosities. This donation marked the first time that artifacts and specimens of Amerindian origin appeared in the Geneva cabinet, which had previously contained "marvels" from the Orient and Asia.

The donation consisted of approximately forty objects, which were later transferred to the collections of the Musée d'ethnographie de Genève. Notable items included a collar made from big cat teeth (identified as jaguar teeth), a flute carved from the femur of an indigenous woman, and numerous jars containing specimens of Surinamese flora and fauna preserved in rum or vinegar. Among the most controversial items was a human fetus of African origin preserved in sugar liqueur, which reflects the dehumanization of enslaved people in 18th-century Europe.

== Family connections and legacy ==
Butini was related to Jean-François Butini, a known opponent of slavery, creating an ironic contrast within the family regarding their positions on the institution. Despite his role as a plantation owner, Ami Butini would likely have been forgotten by history were it not for his ethnographic interests and contributions to early anthropological collections.

Butini died in 1780 in Paramaribo, Suriname, where he had spent the final decades of his life managing his plantation and pursuing his collecting interests.

== Bibliography ==
- Buyssens, Danielle: "Chemins d'objets, route d'esclaves et réseaux de pensée", in: Totem, 54, 2009, pp. 14-15.
- Buyssens, Danielle; Delécraz, Christian: C'est de l'homme que j'ai à parler. Rousseau et l'inégalité, 2012, pp. 44-47 (exhibition catalogue).

== Attribution ==
- This article incorporates text from a free content work. Licensed under CC-BY SA. Text taken from Ami Butini, Bouda Etemad, Historical Dictionary of Switzerland.
