= Jos Chathukulam =

Jos Chathukulam is the Director of the Centre for rural management, Kottayam, Kerala, India.

== Education ==
He did his Post Graduate Studies in Political Science at the University of Kerala and the University of Mysore and later obtained a Doctorate in Development Administration from the Institute for Socio Economic Change (ISEC), Bangalore with ICSSR Fellowship under the supervision of Prof.BS Bhargava. He had served as a Post Doctoral Fellow at the School of International Relation of Mahatma Gandhi University in Kottayam.

== Career ==
He has a number of publications in Economic and Political Weekly and other national and international Journals to his credit. Chathukulam has evaluated 52 major development projects in India which is administered by different national and international agencies including Government of India. He was the team leader of the District Level Monitoring (DLM) of all the Rural Development Programmes in three districts of Kerala.

He has been a consultant of Kerala State Planning Board, Government of Kerala and Vice Chairman the District Planning Committee for the District of Kottayam during the Ninth Five Year Plan. He closely involved in the literacy movement, resource mapping and Peoples Planning in Kerala - a campaign for decentralisation. He is a national level consultant of projects on rural development, panchayat raj and decentralised planning. His areas of interest include decentralization, development administration, employment, rural development, participatory planning and social movements.
