= Satvinder S. Juss =

British legal academic

Satvinder Singh Juss is a British academic and professor. He is professor of law at King's College London and a barrister-at-law in Gray's Inn. He has published widely on the subjects of migration and international human rights law.

== Biography ==
Satvinder Juss was born and raised in colonial East Africa, Tanganyika (now Tanzania) in 1958, during the time of the ‘Mau Mau’ independence movement. His family settled in Wolverhampton in 1968 where Enoch Powell MP made his “Rivers of Blood” speech. (see, http://www.allinlondon.co.uk/whats-on.php?event=165140 ). Juss has a BA Degree in Law and a PhD in Administrative Law from Cambridge University in the United Kingdom. He is currently a Professor of Law at King's College London and serves on the Government of Wales Panel of Advocates (2012) as well as the Equality & Human Rights Panel of Advocates (2015). In 2009, Juss was invited by the Home Affairs Select Committee to a seminar on Human Trafficking in the Houses of Parliament, an event that united the Chairs of the Home Affairs Committees in Europe in an attempt to synchronize standards and procedures. In 2013, Juss was a Member of the Slavery Working Group at the Centre for Social Justice, whose Report led to the UK Government passing the Modern Slavery Act 2015

Juss is a Barrister in the High Court and the Court of Appeal, has argued cases before the British House of Lords and the Privy Council of the United Kingdom, and sits as a Deputy Judge of the Upper Tribunal. He has worked with many brain-trust organizations such as Encounter, the Royal Society of Arts, and the Rowntree Trust, for whom he has given policy speeches. Juss appears in the Legal 500 and is considered a "Legal Expert" in the Directory of Legal Experts. Juss has taught at universities in the UK and the US, including the University of Cambridge and Indiana University in Bloomington. Juss has given various Keynote Speeches and addresses, such as at York University (Toronto) on 'Sexual Identity, Refugee Law, and the Right to live Openly and Freely' (2011); the University of Bergen, Norway (2012); the Alice Tay Lecture on Law & Human Rights in Australia (2013); and the Australian National University lecture (Canberra) on ‘Challenges to Sovereignty’ (2014) He has also been involved with events celebrating the 800th anniversary of the sealing of Magna Carta.

== Main practice areas ==
Constitutional Law (including Public Law and Administration Law), civil liberties and Police (Civ), professional discipline and appellate work (including Privy Council), Immigration.

Juss has special expertise in Comparative Constitutional Law and Public and Administration Law. He is the Director of the MA course in International Peace and Security at King's College Law School in London and specializes in International Refugee Law and in Human Rights, Public Law and Comparative Law.

He is a member of the Editorial Board of the Journal of Sikh Formations: Religion, Culture, Theory. His work in this respect has emphasised the increasing encounter of Sikhism and the Law in contemporary liberal western society.

Recent articles by Juss have used Post-Colonial critique to emphasise the link between the 'War on Terror' and international refugee law in: 'The Post-Colonial Refugee, Dublin II, and the End of Non-Refoulement' International Journal of Minority & Group Rights (vol. 20, No. 2, 2013); Terrorism and the Exclusion of Refugee Status' Journal of Conflict & Security Law (vol. 17, 2012, pp. 1–38); 'Complicity, Exclusion, and the Unworthy in Refugee Law' Refugee Survey Quarterly (vol. 31, No. 3, 2012, p. 1-39); 'Refugee Law and the Protection of Children fleeing Conflict & Violence in Afghanistan' Journal of Conflict & Security Law (vol.18, No.2, 2013, pp. 289–330).

He is the author of five books. Professor Juss' most recent books include 'Contemporary Issues in Refugee Law' (with a Foreword by Lord Phillips) and the 'Ashgate Research Companion on Migration Law, Theory and Policy' (with a Foreword by Dr. Volker Turk of the UNHCR), both of which were published in 2013. He has just completed a jointly authored book, 'Toward a Refugee Oriented Reform of Refugee Law' (with Prof. Laura Westra ad Prof. Tuillo Scovazzi) for Ashgate in 2015.

Juss has also published two articles in 2015: 'The Notion of Complicity in Refugee Law' in the Journal of International Criminal Justice (vol. 12, No. 5, pp. 1183–1200); 'Sexual Orientation and the Sexualisation of Refugee Law' in the International Journal of Minority & Group Rights (vol. 22, No. 1, pp. 128–153).

His current work in progress includes, Landmark Cases in Public Law (with Prof. Maurice Sunkim) by Bloomsbury Press.

== Awards and recognition ==
- 2015 - Appointed for a four-year term to the "Panel of Counsel" which advises the British Government's Equality and Human Rights Commission.
- 2014 - Delivered the Annual Human Rights Lecture for the New Zealand Centre for Human Rights Law, Policy and Practice.
- 2013 - Delivered the Alice Tay Lecture on Law and Human Rights, Australian National University, Canberra, Australia.

== Selected publications ==
=== Books ===
- Immigration, Nationality and Citizenship (Rep. ed.). London: Mansell. 1994.
- Judicial Discretion and the Right to Property. London: Pinter. 1998.
- International Migration and Global Justice (Law and Migration). Ashgate Publishing. 2007.
- A Guide to the Asylum and Immigration (Treatment of Claimants, Etc) Act 2004. Abingdon: Routledge. 2013.
- The Execution of Bhagat Singh: Legal Heresies of the Raj. Stroud: Amberley Publishing. 2020.

=== Articles ===
- The Decline and Decay of European Refugee Policies, Oxford Journal of Legal Studies, ( Vol. 25; Number 4, Winter 2005; pp. 749–792).
- Constitutionalising Rights Without a Constitution: The British Experience under Article 6 of the Human Rights Act 1998, Statute Law Review 2006; Vol. 27; No.1, pp. 1–32.
- Rule-making and the Immigration Rules-A Retreat from Law? Statute Law Review (published by Oxford University Press) (1992) vol.13, No.2, pp. 150–164 (ISSN 0144-3593).
- Suspects' Rights and PACE: Can the Courts do the Balancing Trick? Statute Law Review (published by Oxford University Press) (1991) vol.11, No.3, pp. 211–226 (ISSN 0144-3593).
- The Meaning of 'Error' in Appellate Review in Judicial Review, (December 2004, Vol. 9, Issue 4, pp. 299–304, ISSN 1085-4681).
- Medical Treatment-Pragmatism and the Search for Principle (with Professor Nigel Lowe), Modern Law Review (1993) vol.56, pp. 865–872 (ISSN 0026-7961).
- Towards a Morally Legitimate Reform of Refugee Law : The Uses of Cultural Jurisprudence, Harvard Human Rights Journal, (1998) vol. 11, Spring, pp. 311–354. (ISSN 1057-5057).
- Pritchard v. Cobden [1987]2WLR p.627: An unusual claim in the Court of Appeal Cambridge Law Journal (1986) July, p. 210.
- Judicial Review and the Duty to Give Adequate Reasons Cambridge Law Journal (1986) November, p. 372.
- Declaration of Trust and Severance of Joint Tenancy-the End of the Story? Cambridge Law Journal (1986) July, p. 205.
