= Emil Joos =

Swiss physician and politician (1826–1895)

- Born: 18 November 1826; Schaffhausen, Switzerland
- Died: 22 January 1895 (aged 68); Schaffhausen, Switzerland
- Occupations: Physician; politician
- Spouse: Wilhelmina Oschwald (m. 1865)
- Father: Bernhard Joos
- Relatives: Wilhelm Joos (brother)

Emil Joos (18 November 1826 – 22 January 1895) was a Swiss physician and politician from Schaffhausen. After studying medicine he traveled in Colombia, Ecuador and Peru with his brother Wilhelm Joos from 1852, and in 1860 he was a member of the medical faculty of the university of Costa Rica. Back in Schaffhausen, he opened a medical practice and was a member of the cantonal government from 1866 to 1876 and from 1877 to 1895.

== Biography ==
Emil Joos was born on 18 November 1826 in Schaffhausen, the son of Bernhard Joos. In 1865 he married Wilhelmina Oschwald, daughter of Heinrich Oschwald, a merchant.

Joos studied medicine in Göttingen, Vienna, Montpellier and Paris. From 1852 he traveled with his brother Wilhelm in Colombia, Ecuador and Peru. He had a dental practice in Bogotá, and in 1853–1855 he worked as an itinerant doctor during the Colombian revolution. In 1860 he was a member of the medical faculty of the university of Costa Rica. In 1862 he returned to Schaffhausen by way of the United States, took over the Grafenbuck estate and opened a medical practice.

From 1866 to 1876 and from 1877 to 1895 Joos was a member of the cantonal government (Regierungsrat) of Schaffhausen. In 1872 he became president of the newly founded savings and loan bank Spar- und Leihkasse Schaffhausen (Gewerbebank). The same year he took part in the refounding of the natural science society of Schaffhausen (Naturforschende Gesellschaft Schaffhausen), and in 1874 in the prehistoric excavations in the Freudental. He died in Schaffhausen on 22 January 1895.

== Bibliography ==
- E. Joos, Parteien und Presse im Kanton Schaffhausen, 1975
- E. Joos, "Auf den Spuren von Wilhelm und Emil Joos in Kolumbien", in Schaffhauser Mappe 50, 1982, 37–43

=== Archives ===
- Schaffhausen City Archives (Stadtarchiv Schaffhausen): genealogical register of the city of Schaffhausen
