= Joss McKinley =

British photographer (born 1981)

Joss McKinley is a British photographer.

McKinley studied graphic design at Central Saint Martins, London. After graduating in 2003 he went on to a masters in photography at the University of the Arts London.

He is both an art and commercial photographer and his works consist of still life, landscapes and portraits. His work has been collected by several public museums including the Foam Fotografiemuseum Amsterdam and the National Portrait Gallery, London.

McKinley works on assignments for publications including The New Yorker, The New York Times, WSJ., W Magazine, Vogue and AnOther Magazine.
