= Jos Jullien =

French researcher, politician, prehistorian, and painter-engraver

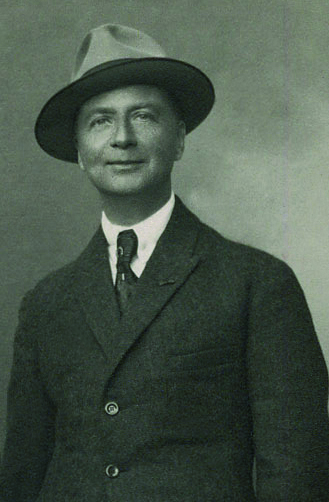
- Born: 2 January 1877; Tournon-sur-Rhône, Ardèche, France
- Died: 22 May 1956 (aged 79); Joyeuse, Ardèche, France
- Occupation: Painter

Joseph Victor Jullien, known as Jos Jullien (January 1877 in Tournon-sur-Rhône, Ardèche, France – 22 May 1956 in Joyeuse, Ardèche), was a French general practitioner, researcher, politician, prehistorian, painter-engraver and writer. His biological work is at the origin of the creation of biotherm cosmetic products.

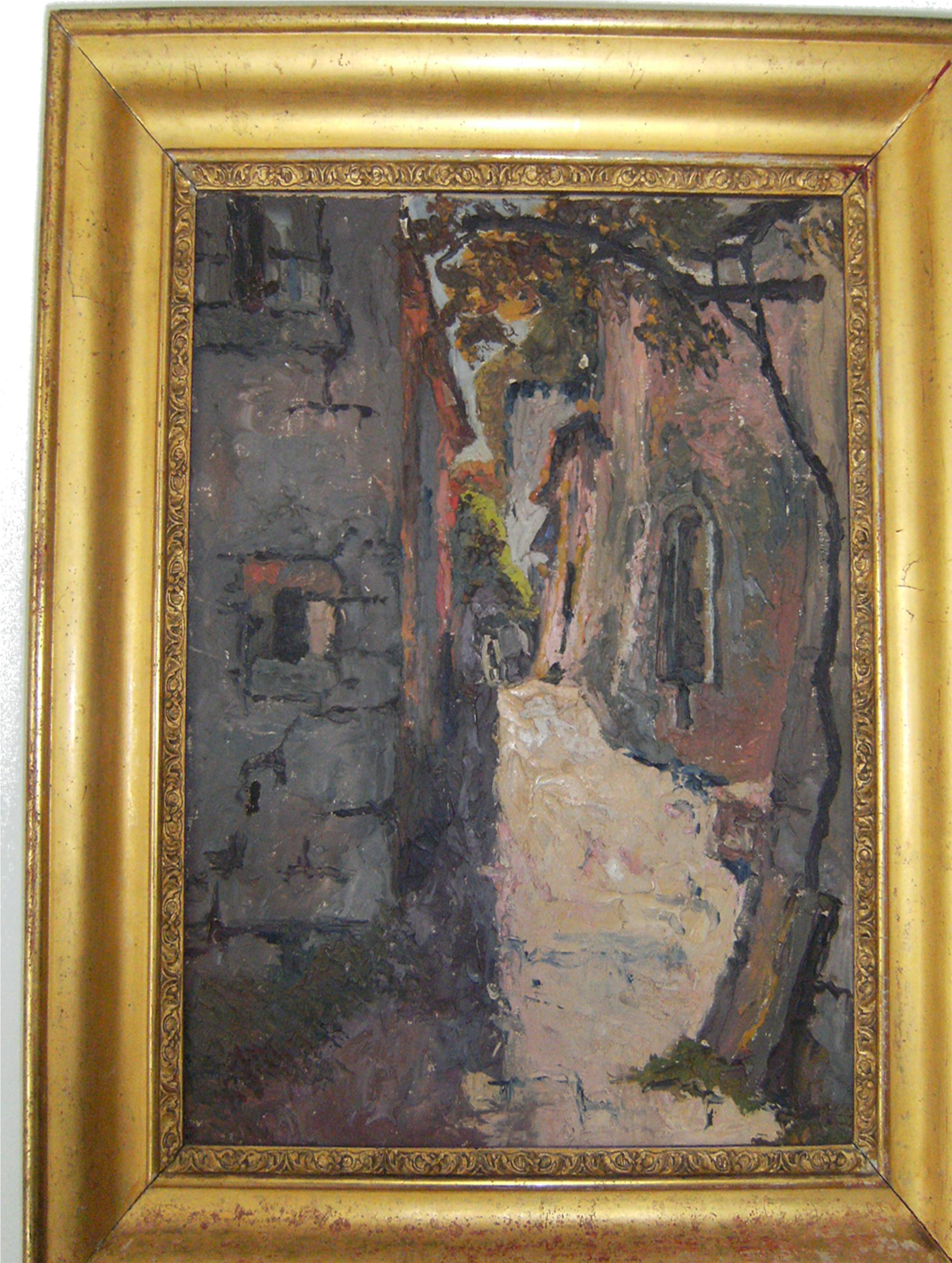
La Venelle by Jos Jullien, watercolor 1910.

== Medical career ==
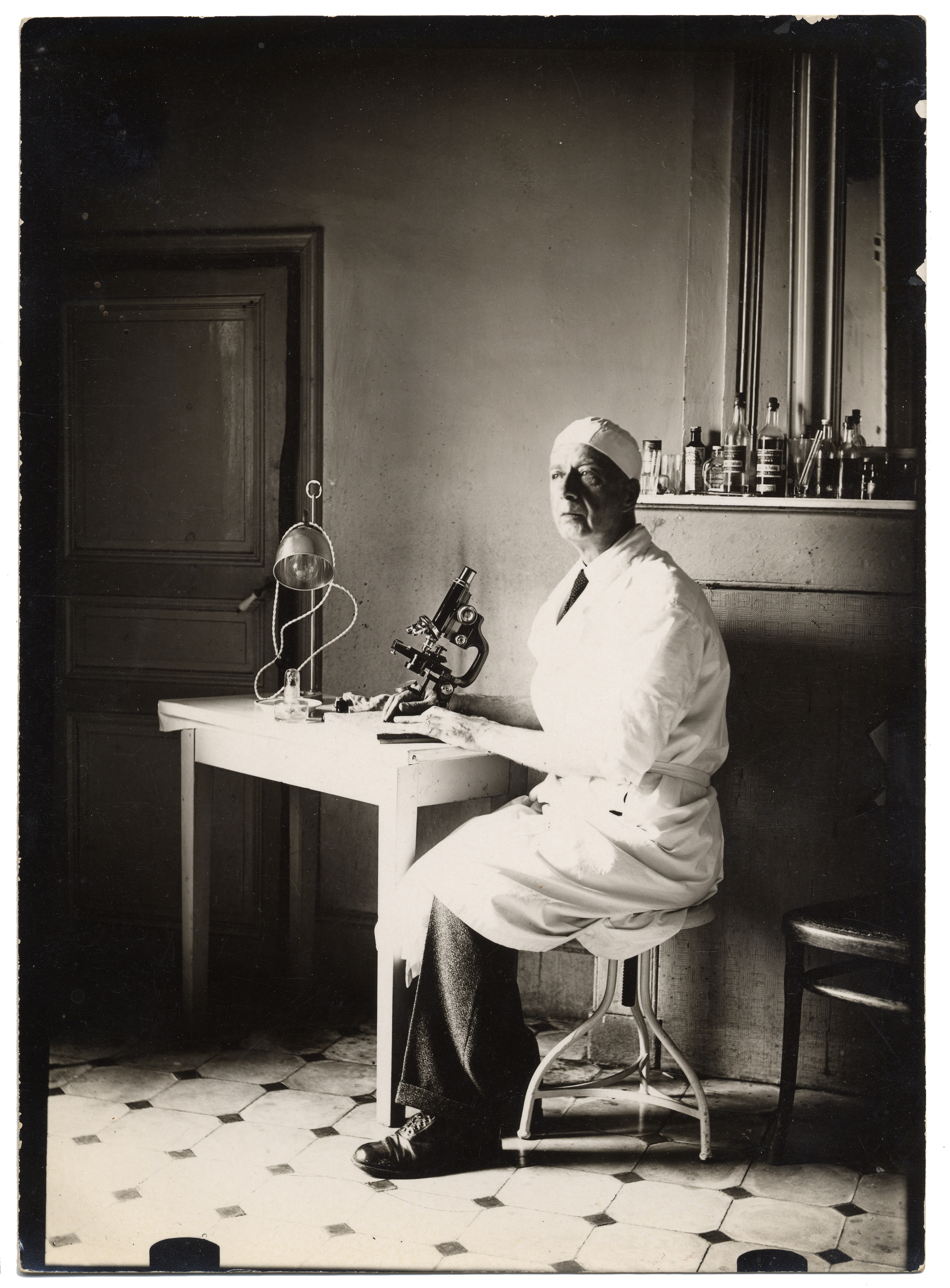
Jos Jullien in his laboratory, 1940.

Dr. Jos Jullien was a doctor, archaeologist, painter, engraver, politician and researcher. He was the world reference for Brucellosis, a disabling disease that affected countries around the Mediterranean. He developed one of the first therapeutic treatments for this pathology and a medical device to relieve the respiratory symptoms of the patients: the SPIRO, in 1934. This device marks a turning point in the medical career of the doctor Jullien. He quickly transformed himself into fitness equipment and Jos Jullien reached an agreement with the spa of Salin les Thermes (Savoie) to commercialize his invention. It was during the visit of the spa that he began to take an interest in the properties of thermal waters, initially as a complement to treatments for patients with Brucellosis.

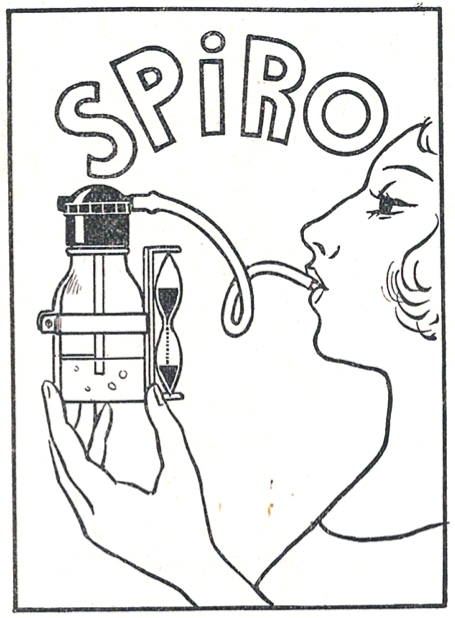
Water Spiroscope of the Dr. Jos Jullien. Extract from the instructions. (patent 793.10 - 1935).

He conducted his first experiments on the waters of Aix les Bains (Savoie) for application in dermatology, but without success. His problem was the conservation of the properties of thermal waters outside the source. This is called the "aging of waters": a thermal water outside the source loses its properties. Why ? Nobody had the answer. He then studied the composition of these waters: minerals, vitamins, radioactivity ... Little by little he became the specialist of thermal waters and understood that the most important element in these waters is plankton. Plankton is a living element that gives the medical properties of waters. When the water is bottled, the physicochemical balance of the water is changed (T°C, Ph, oxygen), the plankton dies and the water loses its properties. He thus founded thermal hydrobiology. In 1946, Adrien Barthélemy bought the small spa town of Molitg-les-Bains in the Pyrénées-Orientales, and contacted Jos Jullien to study the waters of the resort. He wants to commercially exploit the properties of water in the form of derivatives. Jos Jullien becomes the director of the station laboratories which includes a team of about ten people. He is then 69 years old. It identifies a specific plankton of the station that plays a role on the skin. He then appealed to the Marissal couple to strengthen his team and produce a new cosmetic product from plankton. They are developing a method of plankton culture, conservation and integration into a cream. Biotherm (BIOlogy THERMal ) was born. But the wounds of 14-18 Jos Jullien wake up and he can’t follow the research conducted in Molitg as before. It does not appear on the plankton of life patent, even if it is his research that allowed its creation.

== Decorations and Distinctions ==
- Knight of the Legion of Honor (France)
- War Cross (France)
- Officer of Academic Palms (France)
- Medal of Honor of Epidemics (France)
- Medal of Vermeil of the Ministry of War (France) for 35 years of "care given free to the gendarmes".

== Bibliography ==
- Stéphane Rochette, Jos Jullien, une vie gravée en Vivarais, Éditions Archives départementales de l’Ardèche, 2010.
- Laurent Jullien, Le spiroscope du médecin ardéchois Jos Jullien, Éditions Universitaires Européennes, janvier 2017.
- Laurent Jullien, Le médecin ardéchois Jos Jullien (1877-1956), un savant à la carrière hors norme, Revue d’Histoire de la Pharmacie, n°403, p. 381-398, septembre 2019.
