= Spirit Soldier rebellion (1959) =

Peasant uprising in Henan, China

- Part of the resistance against the Great Leap Forward
Date	2–22 February 1959
Location	Sizhuang County, Henan, China
Result	Chinese government victory

Belligerents
"Regiment of Spirit Soldiers"	China

Strength
1,200	Unknown

The Spirit Soldier rebellion of 1959 was an anti-Communist peasant uprising at Sizhuang County, Henan. One of several rebellions which occurred in Henan due to the catastrophic Great Leap Forward implemented by the Chinese government, it lasted for twenty days in February 1959 and was one of the largest rural rebellions in China during the 1950s.

== Background ==
Central China has a long history of both peasant uprisings as well as secret societies. In the 1920s and 1930s uprisings took place in Hubei, Sichuan, Henan, and Guizhou, during which peasant rebels organized as part of a large, decentralized Spirit Soldier movement that taught its members that they could become invulnerable by undergoing secret rituals.

From 1958, the Chinese Communist Party (CCP) under Chairman Mao Zedong launched the Great Leap Forward causing a great crisis in many rural areas of China. The Great Chinese Famine erupted, killing millions, while the starving peasants were not allowed to leave their villages and fields. Despite the catastrophic conditions, people opposed to the Communist policies generally struggled to organize any proper opposition, as the Communist government maintained a strong hold on the country and suppressed most grassroots challenges. Regardless, desperate peasants began to organize low-level resistance. In many cases "redemptive societies" were involved; these were often secret societies or salvationist religions. Some of these groups went beyond spiritual and passive resistance, and actually attempted uprisings. While numerous resistance groups and rebellions broke out, most of these remained small in scale.

== Rebellion ==
Armed resistance in Henan began in 1959 with cases of banditry, as members of the militia deserted, stole weapons, set up roadblocks and tried to intercept food transports. According to researcher S.A. Smith, the Spirit Soldier rebellion of 1959 was one of the few open rebellions that were "by no means trivial". A secret society known as "Regiment of Spirit Soldiers" (Shenbingtuan) initially gathered about 1,200 followers from several Chinese provinces such as Hubei, Sichuan, and Shaanxi. This substantial force then moved into Henan, where it attacked government offices in Sizhuang County on 2 February 1959. Chinese security forces needed twenty days to put down the uprising.

== Aftermath ==
Unrest continued in central China and other regions during 1959 and 1960, but never came close to threatening the power of the Chinese Communist Party.

== See also ==
- List of peasant revolts
