= Jos Bax =

Dutch footballer (1946–2020)

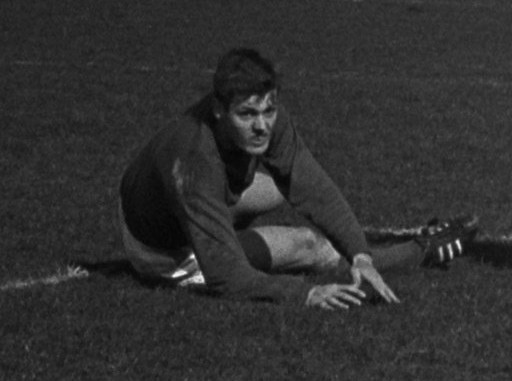
- Bax in 1967.

Personal information
- Date of birth: 29 March 1946
- Place of birth: Eindhoven, Netherlands
- Date of death: 21 July 2020 (aged 74)
- Position: Goalkeeper

Senior career*
Years	Team	Apps	(Gls)
- RPC
1965–1972	Eindhoven	80	(0)
1972–1975	Helmond Sport	1	(0)
1975–1976	FC VVV	1	(0)
- Overpelt
- VOS
Total		82	(0)
- * Club domestic league appearances and goals

Jos Bax (29 March 1946 – 21 July 2020) was a Dutch professional footballer who played as a goalkeeper for RPC, EVV Eindhoven, Helmond Sport, VVV, Overpelt and VOS.

== Career ==
After playing for amateur club RPC, he signed for EVV Eindhoven in 1965. As his registration was not done in time he was ineligible for the 1965–66 season, and played handball instead. At Eindhoven he made 80 league and 2 Cup appearances. He later played for Helmond Sport and VVV. He played his only league match for VVV on 7 March 1976 against FC Volendam. He then played in Belgium for Overpelt before finishing his career back in the Netherlands with amateur club VOS.
