= Jos van der Vegt =

Dutch businessman

Gerardus Johannes Hendricus "Jos" van der Vegt (born 22 April 1953, in Rotterdam) is a Dutch businessman. He is currently a member of the board of Feyenoord Rotterdam as well as director of Rotterdam Ahoy. He is also chairman of the Rotterdam Marathon and part of the Economic Development Board Rotterdam. Between 1991 and 1996 he was director of the Feyenoord Stadion.
