= Joss (Chinese statue) =

Chinese religious statue

A joss is an English term used to refer to a Chinese deity or idol. It generally describes a Chinese religious statue, object (such as joss paper), or idol in many Chinese folk religions.

== Etymology ==
The English designation "joss" first appeared in the 18th century as a reference to a Chinese idol. The term is usually explained as a borrowing from Portuguese deus or deos, meaning "god". The main objection to this connection with Portuguese deus/deos is that it does not address the linguistic routes that would have allegedly led to the appearance of "joss", with its Chinese religious connotation. Most likely, the English form does describe an actual Chinese divinity, viz. the dizhu shen, being the tutelary deity of the land (and heaven) and its inhabitants. Known under various epithets and names, this paternal god, who confers luck and wealth on his loyal worshippers, occupies a central position in the folk beliefs of many (overseas) Chinese communities.

A similar form is also attested in Dutch as "joos" or "josie", which is a taboo form for the devil (often "corrected" to the less offensive sounding, personal name Joost). This was already noticed by Samuel Hull Wilcocke who translated the travelogues of the Dutch captain and explorer John Splinter Stavorinus.

== Uses ==
Josses serve multiple functions in traditional Chinese religious customs, varying by the specific tradition. Although the word directly translates to "god", the term "joss" is used to describe a physical statue that is believed to be the dwelling place of a specific deity. Josses are often decorated with golden plaques, which are given by the worshippers as a sign of reverence and respect.

Josses are used as a symbolic representation of a particularly important god or goddess. They are often used as a means of divination. Depending upon the tradition, josses will be found in family homes, be communally shared, and appear in temples across China and Taiwan.

=== Taiwanese tradition ===
Josses belong to specific villages and are considered to be owned by the village temple. Most josses are passed throughout the homes of the village, where they reside for a time. The temple altars host at least one joss, which represents the village's main god. Josses will be placed at the center of an altar in the worshipper's home, where they make offerings to them, and are used to communicate to the deity.

=== Southern Chinese tradition ===
Statues of deities, such as Guanyin (the goddess of mercy) and Guangong (the god of justice), are placed on altars in every new business and restaurant. Josses play an important role in ritual ceremonies. The spiritualization ceremony for new temples involves inviting the spirits into statues made of clay, and in doing so, creates a joss. If the invitation ceremony is successful, the spirit lives inside the statue indefinitely. Significantly more women than men visit the temples and make offerings to the josses. Different deities in the temples have their own special abilities and characteristics. Many worshippers will have josses of a particular deities that can bring about good health or good fortune at home or at work.

== See also ==
- Ancestor worship
- Chinese folk religion
- Divination
- Joss paper
