= Yost =

Yost may refer to:

== Buildings in the United States ==
- Yost Ice Arena, the University of Michigan ice hockey arena
- Yost Theater, a historic theater in Santa Ana, California
- Yost Tavern Historic old tavern on the National Register of Historic Places, Montgomery, Ohio

== Places in the United States ==
- Yost, Utah, (Box Elder County) an unincorporated community (formerly incorporated- August 19, 1935-January 6, 1984)
- Yost, Virginia, (Bath County) an unincorporated community
- Yosts, New York, (Montgomery County) an unincorporated community

== Other uses ==
- Yost (surname), a surname, including a list of people with this name
- Yošt, a character in Iranian mythology who defeated Axtya
- Rollover cable, also called a Yost cable

== See also ==
- Jost, a German given name and surname
