= Jodocus =

Jodocus is a given name. Notable people with the name include:

- Jodocus Badius (1462–1535), Flemish pioneer of the printing industry
- Jodocus Hondius (1563–1612), Flemish/Dutch engraver and cartographer
- Joos de Damhouder (1507–1581), also referred to as Jodocus (de) Damhouder, jurist from Bruges

== See also ==
- Saint Judoc
- Josse (disambiguation)
- Joos (disambiguation)
- Joost (name)
- Joest
- Jost
- Jobst
