= Joost (name) =

- Pronunciation: Dutch: [joːst] Afrikaans: [juəst]
- Gender: Male

Origin
- Origin: Breton
- Region of origin: Dutch

Other names
- Related names: Jodocus, Jost, Yost, Julius

Joost is a Dutch masculine given name. It derives from the name Jodocus, which can ultimately be traced back to Saint Judoc, a Breton saint of the 7th century: Jodocus → Josse → Joos → Joost (the addition of an end-t is a peculiarity of the Dutch language, especially some local dialects). Sometimes the (originally Ancient Roman) name Justus was used to represent Joost. This may have led to confusion between Justus and Jodocus as the origin of Joost. In Dutch proper it is pronounced [joːst], while in Afrikaans it is pronounced [juəst].

== People named Joost ==
=== Given name ===
- Joost Banckert (c. 1597 – 1647), Dutch Vice Admiral
- Joost Berman (1793–1855), Dutch judge and poet
- Joost Bürgi (1552–1632), Swiss clockmaker and mathematician
- Joost Businger (1924–2023), Dutch-American meteorologist
- Joos van Cleve (c. 1485–1490 – 1540/1541), Netherlandish painter
- Joost van Dyk (fl. 1625–1631), Dutch privateer
- Joost Eerdmans (born 1971), Dutch politician
- Jan Joest van Kalkar (c. 1450–1460 – 1519), Netherlandish painter
- Ioes Karest (c. 1500–1560), also written as Joos Karest, Flemish harpsichord builder
- Arnold Joost van Keppel (1670–1718), 17th century Dutch nobleman
- Joost Klein (born 1997), Dutch rapper known mononymously as Joost
- Joost Lagendijk (born 1957), Dutch politician
- Joost Manassen (1927–2019), Dutch-Israeli chemist
- Joost Niemöller (born 1957), Dutch writer and former journalist
- Joost de Soete (c. 1510–1520 – 1589), Dutch field marshal and Lord of Villers
- Joost Swarte (born 1947), Dutch comic artist and graphical designer
- Joost van den Vondel (1587–1679), German-Dutch writer and playwright
- Joost van der Westhuizen (1971–2017), South African rugby player
- Joos van Wassenhove (Justus van Gent} (c. 1410 – c. 1480), Flemish painter
- Joost Zwagerman (1963–2015), Dutch writer and poet

=== Surname ===
- Eddie Joost (1916–2011), American baseball player
- Gesche Joost (born 1974), German design researcher
- Oskar Joost (1898–1941), German musician
- Risto Joost (born 1980), Estonian conductor and operatic countertenor
