= Yost (surname) =

Yost is a surname that originates as an anglicized spelling of the Dutch name Joost or German surname Jost.

== Notable people ==
=== Government ===
- Charles Woodruff Yost (1907–1981), American diplomat
- Dave Yost (born 1956), American lawyer, politician and Ohio State Attorney General
- Ellis Asby Yost (1872–1962), American lawyer and West Virginia state senator for whom the prohibitionist "Yost Law" of 1913 is named
- Eric Yost (born 1955), American politician, attorney and judge
- Jack Yost (born 1945), American politician and West Virginia state senator
- Jacob Senewell Yost (1801–1872), American politician and Pennsylvania Representative
- Jacob Yost (Virginia politician) (1853–1933), American politician and Virginia Representative
- Joseph R. Yost (born 1986), American politician, Virginia state delegate
- Paul A. Yost Jr. (1929–2022), American Coast Guard Commandant
- Robert L. Yost (1922–1990), American diplomat
- Thomas B. Yost, United States Environmental Protection Agency federal judge

=== Media ===
- Casper Yost (1864–1941), American newspaper editor
- Christopher Yost (born 1973), American film and animation screenwriter
- David Yost (born 1969), American actor
- Dennis Yost (1943–2008), American singer and frontman of pop group Classics IV
- Dorothy Yost (1899–1967), American screenwriter
- Elwy Yost (1925–2011), Canadian television host
- Gary Yost (born 1959), American filmmaker and software designer
- Graham Yost (born 1959), Canadian film and television screenwriter
- Herbert Yost (1879–1945), American silent film actor
- Tibor Yost (1896–1968), Hungarian screenwriter and journalist

=== Sports ===
- David Yost (American football), American football coach
- Dick Yost (1929–1973), American golfer
- Eddie Yost (1926–2012), American baseball player and coach
- Fielding H. Yost (1871–1946), American football player and coach
- Gus Yost (fl. 1893), American baseball player
- Jack Yost (footballer) (1923–1953), Australian rules footballer
- Jordan Yost (born 2006), American baseball player
- Ned Yost (born 1954), American baseball player and manager
- Nick Yost (1915–1980), American basketball player
- Sandra Yost, Australian swimmer
- Shane Yost (born 1977), Australian rollerblader

=== Other ===
- Benjamin Yost, American philosopher
- Christopher Yost (biologist), Canadian biologist
- David S. Yost (born 1948), American academic and author on international relations
- Edna Yost (1889–1971), American writer
- Gaylord Yost (1888–1958), American violinist, composer, and teacher
- George Washington Newton Yost (1831–1895), American inventor and typewriter manufacturer
- Gilbert Yost (died 1886), American criminal
- James Jackson Yost, American inventor of the agricultural/farm version of the grain elevator
- Joseph W. Yost (1847–1923), American architect
- Lenna Lowe Yost (1878–1972), American suffragist and temperance leader
- Lyle Yost (1913–2012), American agriculture equipment manufacturer and inventor
- Isaac M. "Ike" Yost (1848-1946), American miller and frontier industrialist
- Mary Yost (1881–1954), American academic
- Michèl Yost (1754–1786), French musician, teacher, and cofounder of the French clarinet school
- Nellie Snyder Yost (1905–1992), American historian and writer
- Paul Edward Yost (1919–2007), American inventor of the modern hot air balloon
- Richard Yost (born 1953), American scientist
- Robert M. Yost (1917–2006), American philosopher
