= Jobst =

Jobst is a given name and surname. Notable people with the name include:

== Given name ==
- Jost Amman (1539–1591), Swiss-German artist
- Jobst Brandt (1935–2015), American bicycle racer
- Jobst Burgi (1552–1632), Swiss clock and instrument maker
- Jobst Fricke (born 1930), German university teacher and musicologist
- Jobst Harrich (1579–1617), German painter
- Jobst Hirscht (born 1948), German sprinter
- Jobst Nikolaus I, Count of Hohenzollern (1433–1488), German nobleman
- Jobst I, Count of Holstein-Schauenburg (1483–1531), German nobleman
- Jobst I, Count of Hoya (1460–1507), German nobleman
- Jobst II, Count of Hoya (1493–1545), German nobleman
- Jobst Kuch (1902–1963), German painter
- Jobst of Limburg (1560–1621), German nobleman
- Jobst Herman, Count of Lippe (1625–1678), German nobleman
- Jobst of Moravia, 15th-century King of Germany
- Jobst Oetzmann (born 1961), German film director and screenwriter
- Jobst Herman, Count of Schaumburg (1593–1635), German nobleman
- Jobst von Scholten (1647–1721), Dano-Norwegian Army officer and engineer
- Jobst Wagner (born 1959), Swiss entrepreneur
- Wolf Jobst Siedler (1926–2013), German writer and publisher
- Daniel Jobst Müller (born 1965), German biophysicist
- Friedrich-Jobst Volckamer von Kirchensittenbach (1894–1989), German general

== Surname ==
- Herbert Jobst, German writer (1915–1990)
- John Jobst, German clergyman (1920–2014)
- Jola Jobst, German actress (1915–1952)
- Karl Jobst, Australian speedrunner, YouTuber, and journalist
- Kerstin Susanne Jobst, German historian and professor
- Mason Jobst, American ice hockey player (b. 1994)
- Rolf Jobst, German rower (b. 1951)
- Wilhelm Jobst (1912–1947), German physician and convicted war criminal
- Wolfgang Jobst, Australian sports shooter (b. 1956)

== See also ==
- Judoc, a Breton stain also known as Jobst
