= Yoest =

Yoest is a surname. Notable people with the surname include:

- Bill Yoest (born 1951), American football player
- Charmaine Yoest (born 1964), American writer and commentator

== See also ==
- Yost (surname)
