= Josse =

Josse may refer to

- Saint Judoc, otherwise known as Josse
  - Saint-Josse, a place in France
  - Sint Joost, a place in the Netherlands
  - Saint-Josse-ten-Noode, a place in Belgium
- Josse, a variant of the name Jodocus
- Josse, Landes, a place in France
- Jösse Hundred, Sweden
- Jösse Car, a Swedish sports car manufacturer

== See also ==
- Joos (disambiguation)
- Joost (disambiguation)
- Joss (disambiguation)
