= Master of the Morrison Triptych =

Early Netherlandish painter

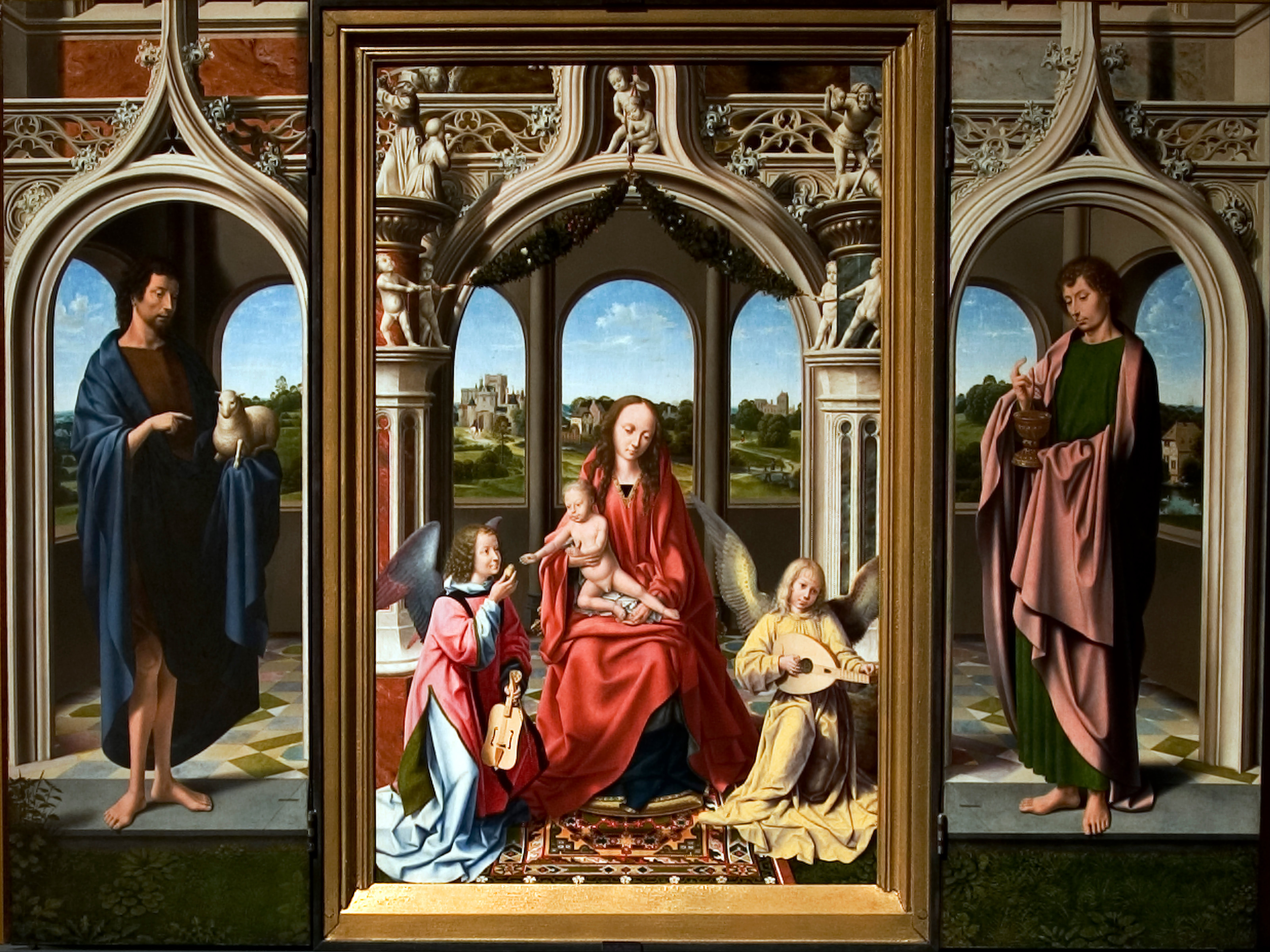
The Morrison Triptych, Toledo Museum of Art

The Master of the Morrison Triptych is the name given to an unknown Early Netherlandish painter active in Antwerp around 1500–1510. He is named for the Morrison Triptych, now in Toledo, Ohio, United States, which is described below.

The same master is attributed an Adoration of the Magi with donor portrait, in the Philadelphia Museum of Art, c. 1504, probably the side-wing of another triptych. It is dateable by the stage of progress reached in the construction of the new tower of Antwerp Cathedral in the background, a typical exhibition of civic pride. A triptych in the National Gallery, London (NG 1085) has been suggested as another work by the artist. In Lisbon's Museu Nacional de Arte Antiga there is yet another triptych believed to have been painted by this master with the Virgin with the Child and Angels, and with St John the Baptist and St john the Evangelist in the side panels. Two surviving panels from Triptych of the Chapel of the Magi of the Church of Ribeira Brava are exhibited at the Sacred Art Museum of Funchal. Museum Catharijneconvent in Utrecht houses a small panel painting with an Adoration of the Shepherds (ABM s355) that is attributed to the master.

== The Morrison Triptych ==
The Morrison Triptych is an altarpiece in triptych or three-paneled form, by the master and probably painted around 1500 A.D. The work is named after an earlier owner, the British collector Alfred Morrison, and is now in the Toledo Museum of Art in Toledo, Ohio, United States. The painting is not to be confused with a modern work of the same name celebrating Jim Morrison of The Doors.

The work loosely repeats the composition of an earlier triptych, now in Vienna (the St John Altarpiece), by Hans Memling, with the addition of the lute-playing angel. The new composition, in turn, was copied by Joos van Cleve in another altarpiece - such borrowings being very common in Early Netherlandish art. The external panels are decorated with paintings intended to appear as sculpture depicting Adam and Eve, characters from the Old Testament. These “painted sculptures” of Adam and Eve cast shadows to their proper left and the front panel is painted to appear to reflect a candle that would be placed on the altar in front of this altarpiece. The pedestals in which the “sculptures” stand protrude toward the viewer, appearing three-dimensional and including the viewer in their realm.

The panels open to reveal a landscape in the background and in the central panel an image of the Virgin Mary and the Christ child and angels, central figures of the Christian religion. Connecting the three scenes of the inner view are not only the floor tiles, blue sky and continuous landscape but also the repetition of the architectural arch motif and the balustrade with tracery at the top of the image.

Although the design is continuous, the characters depicted on the inner left and right-hand panels are not quite in the same picture space as the central group, though they share the architectural setting. This is because, most unusually, the side-panels are unframed, and there is a frame around the central panel.

=== Iconography ===
When the triptych panels are closed Adam and Eve, subjects of “The Original Sin” are portrayed on the outer left hand (Adam) and right hand (Eve) panels of the triptych. When the triptych panels are opened images immediately recognizable to anyone viewing this in the 16th century showing the enthroned Virgin Mary accompanied with the Christ child and two angels. On the inner left-hand panel John the Baptist with his attribute of a lamb and on the inner right-hand panel John the Evangelist with his of a chalice. The columns in the center image also host portrayals of figures painted as if sculpture on the capitals: on the left a man with a sword raised to decapitate a character and another man above the capital on the right column a character who has just decapitated the head of a character. These images are depicting sacrifice: Abraham being stopped by an angel before sacrificing his only son Jacob on the left and on the right, Jephthah (“the fool”) who sacrificed his daughter because of a promise to sacrifice the first person he saw when he returned to his city, despite being saddened to be greeted by his own daughter upon that return. “Sacrifice and Salvation” are portrayed by the open prospect of the triptych.

== Sources ==
- Robinson, Nancy; Toledo Museum of Art docent class of 2007 detail captured from lecture Larry Nichols, Curator from The Toledo Museum of Art - January 2008
