= Joesting =

Joesting is a surname. Notable people with the surname include:

- Herb Joesting (1905–1963), American football player and coach
- John F. Joesting (died 1978), American politician

== See also ==
- Joest, a surname
