= Joost (disambiguation) =

Joost may refer to:

- Joost, a P2PTV service and software for distributing TV shows online

== Places ==
- Sint Joost, a small village in the Dutch municipality of Echt-Susteren
- Sint-Joost-ten-Node, a Belgian town and municipality in the Brussels district
- Jost Van Dyke, one of the main islands of the British Virgin Islands

== People ==
- Joost (name), a given name and surname
- Joost Klein, a Dutch musician known mononymously as Joost
