= Sacred Art Museum of Funchal =

- Museu de Arte Sacra do Funchal
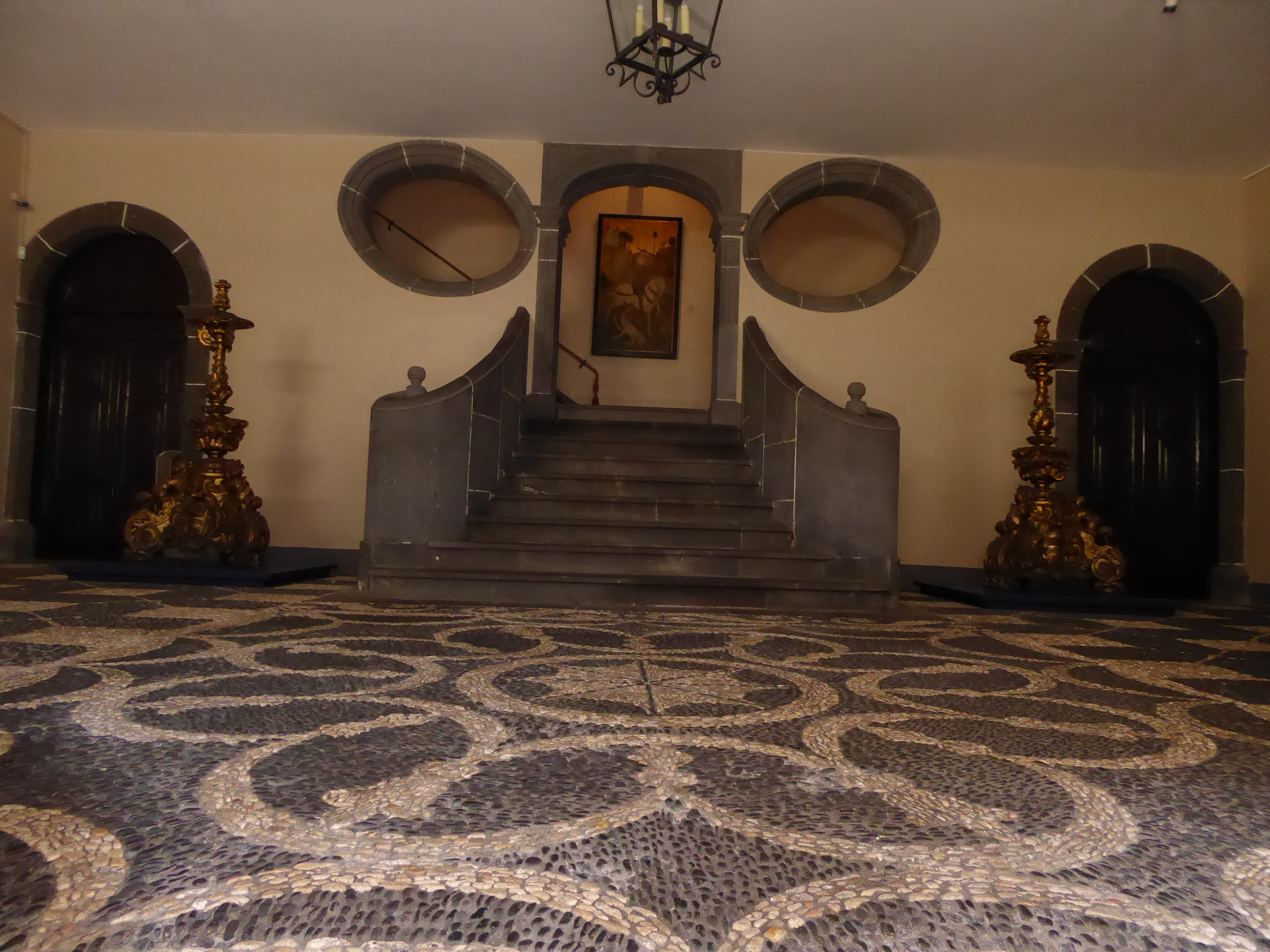
- Entrance to the Sacred Art Museum of Funchal
- Established: 1 July 1955; 71 years ago
- Location: Sé, Funchal, Madeira
- Coordinates: 32.6494°N 16.9085°W
- Director: João Henrique Silva
- Website: www.masf.pt

The Sacred Art Museum of Funchal (Portuguese: Museu de Arte Sacra do Funchal) is located in the Episcopal Palace of Funchal, Madeira.

Notable Flemish painters whose works are exhibited:

- Pieter Coecke van Aelst
- Dieric Bouts
- Joos van Cleve
- Gerard David
- Jan Gossart
- Jan Provoost
- Master of the Morrison Triptych
- Master of the Adoration of Machico
