= Cornelis van Cleve =

Flemish Renaissance painter (1520 – 1567/1614)

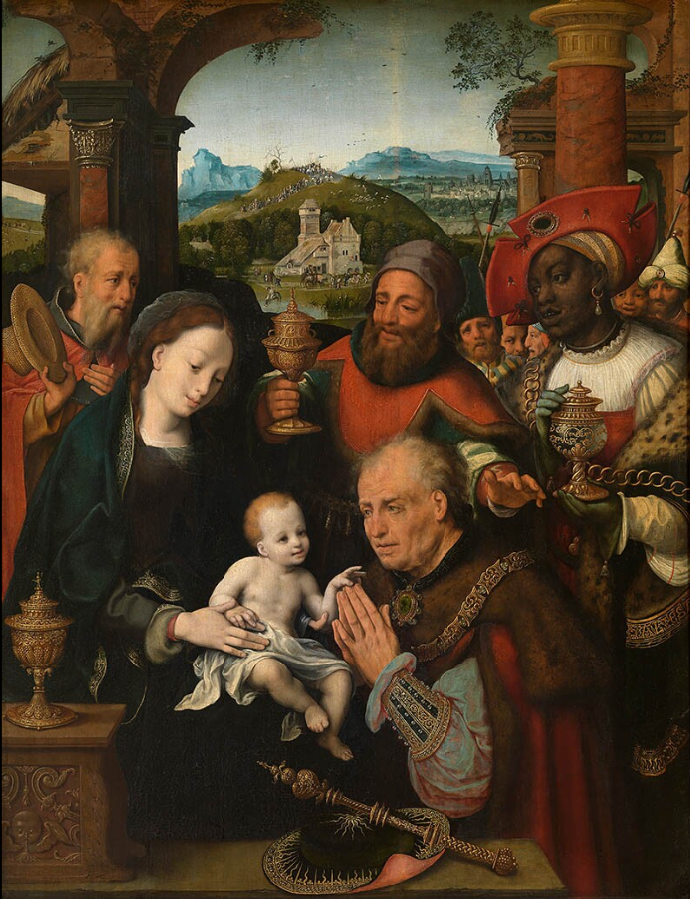
Adoration of the Magi

Cornelis van Cleve, Cornelis van Cleef or Cornelis van der Beke, nickname Sotte Cleve ('Mad Cleve') (1520 in Antwerp – 1567/1614) was a Flemish Renaissance painter active in Antwerp who is known for his religious compositions and portraits. Starting his career in Antwerp in the workshop of his father Joos van Cleve, he later worked for a while in London. When he failed to achieve success in England, he became insane and stopped painting.

== Life ==
He was born in Antwerp as the son of Anna Vijdt and Joos van Cleve, a prominent representative of the 16th-century Antwerp school of painting. Little is known about his training but it is believed he trained in his father's studio. Some details of his life have become mixed up with those of his father. It was believed previously it was his father who became mad and was given the nickname 'Sotte Cleve' ('Mad Cleve'). However, the current view is that it was Cornelis who became mad.

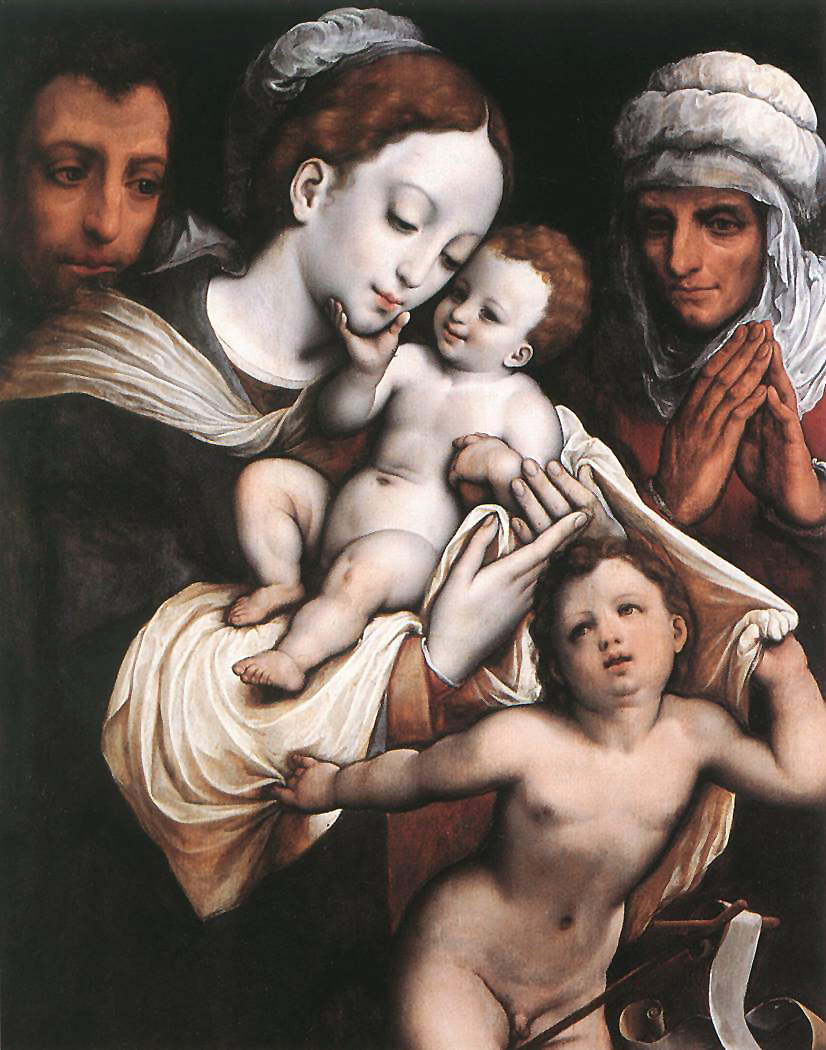
Holy Family

Cornelis was a proficient helper in the studio of his father, probably from 1535 to 1540. It is not clear when Cornelis van Cleve became a master in the local Guild of Saint Luke. As the son of a master he did not need to register as a pupil with the Guild. He may have become a master in the Guild year 1540-1541 during which his father died. The records of the Guild for that year are lost. He seems to have been a struggling artist. There are reports that in 1546 and 1547 he had difficulties making payments on his house. This is likely the reason why he sold the house in 1555 and emigrated to England. An additional reason may have been that he harbored Protestant sympathies, as may be surmised from the name of his daughter Abigael.

The artist likely went to England to seek the patronage of Philip II of Spain who had become the joint ruler of England after his marriage to Mary I of England. The madness was reportedly caused by a conflict between Cornelis and the prominent portrait painter Anthonis Mor. He had asked Mor to plead on his behalf with Philip II to give him commissions but Mor's intercession had been unsuccessful. This episode caused the artist to become insane.

It is not clear when the artist died. Estimates place the time of his death between 1567 and 1614.

== Works ==
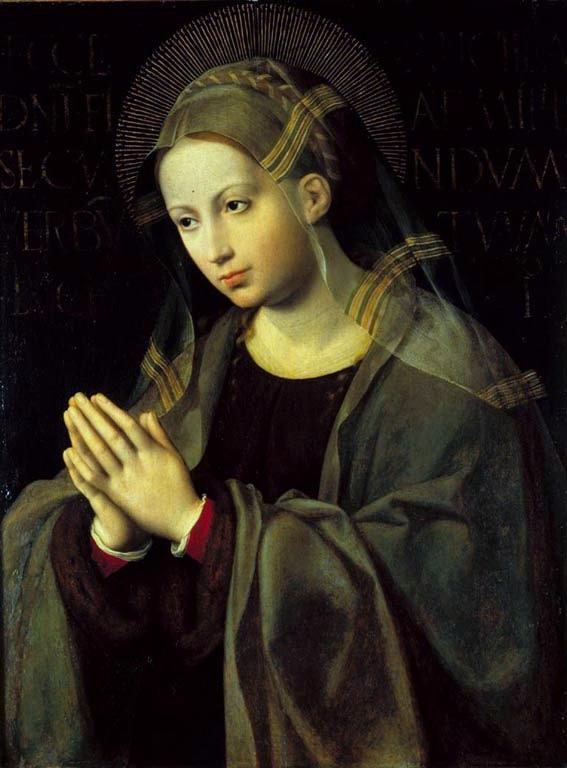
Virgin of the Annunciation

Cornelis van Cleve was only active during a fourteen-year period in Antwerp and London. Nevertheless, he was able to leave an extensive body of work as can be deduced from the frequent mention of his works in 16th and 17th-century inventories. Rubens owned two works by the artist. The English King Charles I also owned two works by 'Sotte Cleve', which are no longer in the Royal Collection including a 'Bacchus feast of children being some, one and twenty figures'. Max J. Friedländer identified a group of works originally attributed to an artist given the notname Pseudo-Lombard as works of Cornelis van Cleve. Of the works attributed to both Joos van Cleve and Cornelis van Cleve, the authorship of father or son remains often a matter of dispute.

Cornelis van Cleve painted predominantly religious paintings and to a lesser extent mythological scenes and portraits. Walter Friedländer organised van Cleve's pictures in chronological order, based on the development in his style. He thus showed that the painter had distanced himself gradually from his father's style. Initially he was a representative of the tradition in the period dominated by Pieter Coecke van Aelst, Frans Floris and Anthonis Mor, Flemish painters who had studied in Italy or had become influenced by Italian art. He made efforts to keep up with the new style by eagerly looking around for Italian models. This paintings show influences from Raphael, Leonardo da Vinci and Andrea del Sarto.
