= Benjamin Yost =

American philosopher

Education
- Education: University of California, Berkeley (PhD); Katholieke Universiteit, Leuven (MA); Goshen College (BA)

Philosophical work
- Era: 21st-century philosophy
- Region: Western philosophy
- Institutions: Cornell University, Providence College, Harvard University, Auburn Correctional Facility, Bard Prison Initiative
- Main interests: philosophy of punishment
- Website: https://benjaminsyost.net/

Benjamin Yost is an American philosopher and adjunct professor of philosophy at Cornell University. Previously he was Professor of Philosophy at Providence College. He is known for his works on philosophy of punishment.

== Books ==
- Against Capital Punishment, Oxford University Press 2019
- The Movement for Black Lives: Philosophical Perspectives (ed.), Oxford University Press 2021
