= George Washington Newton Yost =

American inventor (1831–1895)

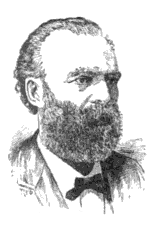
- George Washington Newton Yost
- Born: April 15, 1831; Starkey, New York, United States
- Died: September 26, 1895 (aged 64); New York City, United States
- Education: Starkey seminary
- Occupations: Entrepreneur and inventor
- Spouse: Sophia Church Hayden
- Scientific career
- Fields: Typewriter

George Washington Newton Yost (April 15, 1831 – September 28, 1895) was an American entrepreneur and inventor who has been described as one of the pioneers in the birth of the first manufactured typewriters. He founded the Yost Writing Machine Company and began producing his typewriters around 1887 in Bridgeport, Connecticut.

== Career ==
He started his career by working as a farmhand. He then invented the cotton plough and scraper which made him a lot of money. Later he started working in the oil business. In 1868, he invented the Climax Mowing machine.

=== Typewriter ===
In 1887, he created a model of the earliest Yost typewriter machine. He had previously studied the design of the original typewriter created by Sholes, Glidden and Soule company. He got into the typewriter business and became a business partner of James Densmore. He then formed the American Writing Machine Company, which produced one of the Remington's main competitors, the Caligraph. The Writing Machine Company was headquartered at 1087-1155 Railroad Avenue in Bridgeport, Connecticut.

=== Other endeavours ===
He was also a dedicated spiritualist. He built, at his own cost, a church in Corry, Pennsylvania, and employed a clergyman who was well read in Christian doctrine. When Yost died on September 26, 1895 in New York City, it was reported that he "remained a firm spiritualist to the end".

== Personal life ==
He was born on 15 April 1831 in Starkey, New York. He was the third child and second son of farmer John DeWitt Yost and his wife Patty Ann (nee Newton). He married Sophia Church Hayden at New Castle, Pennsylvania, on January 28, 1858.

== See also ==
- Typewriter
- James Densmore
- Christopher Latham Sholes
- E. Remington and Sons
