= Axtya =

In Zoroastrian mythology, Axtya, also spelt Akhtya or Axt (Avestan: axtya, Middle Persian: Axt), is an evil sorcerer and an opponent of the religion, known for killing those who were not able to answer his riddles. There is a mention of him in the Avesta, where the hero Yōišta of the Fryāna family (Middle Persian: Yōšt-ī Friyān) performs a sacrifice to the goddess Aredvi Sura Anahita, who grants him the boon of being able to answer Axtya's 99 questions. This story is elaborated at greater length in the mediaeval Pahlavi text Mādayān ī Yōšt ī Friyān. There Axtya threatens to destroy a certain city unless a righteous man comes out and solves his riddles. Yōšt steps forward for this task, and with some divine assistance manages to answer all of Axtya's 33 questions, after which he asks three questions of his own. Unable to answer them, Axtya seeks help from Ahriman, who refuses to reveal the answers. Axtya then admits defeat and is ritually slain by Yosht. This story is likely to be of an Indo-European origin as there are broad parallels in Nordic mythology, particularly in the wisdom contest between Odin and the giant Vafþrúðnir in the Vafþrúðnismál poem of the Poetic Edda, as well as the contest described in chapter 10 of the 13th-century Hervarar Saga.

== Bibliography ==
- Haug, Martin; West, Edward William, eds. (1872), "The Tale of G̣ôsht-i Fryânô", The Book of Arda Viraf, London, Bombay, pp. 247–66
- Dhalla, Manekji Nasarvanji (1938). A history of Zoroastrianism. New York: OUP.
- Hultgård, Anders (2009). "The wisdom contest in Vafþrúðnismál". In Wilhelm Heizmann; Klaus Böldl; Heinrich Beck; Kurt Schier (eds.). Analecta Septentrionalia: Beiträge zur nordgermanischen Kultur- und Literaturgeschichte. Ergänzungsbände zum Reallexikon der germanischen Altertumskunde. Vol. Bd. 65. Berlin; New York: De Gruyter. ISBN 978-3-11-021869-5.
- Kanga, M.F. (2011). "Axt". Encyclopædia Iranica.
