= Joost Manassen =

Dutch-Israeli chemist (1927–2019)

Joost Manassen (Hebrew: יוסט מנסן; 17 February 1927 – October 2019) was a Dutch-Israeli chemist who was a professor at the faculty of chemistry of the Weizmann Institute of Science.

== Career ==
Manassen was born on 17 February 1927 in Amersfoort. During World War II he went into hiding from the Nazis on a farm in North Holland. In 1959 he obtained his PhD at the University of Amsterdam under Professor F.L.J. Sixma with a thesis titled, "Reactions of the n-butenes and 2-butanol in dilute acid solution : a mechanistic study". Manassen moved to Israel and started working for the Weizmann Institute of Science. In the 1970s, after the 1973 oil crisis, Manassen worked on alternative energy based on solar power. In 1983 he became head of the Department of Materials Research. Manassen died in Rehovot in October 2019.

Manassen was elected a corresponding member of the Royal Netherlands Academy of Arts and Sciences in 1986.
