= Kerstin Susanne Jobst =

German historian and professor

Kerstin Susanne Jobst is a German historian and professor. Since 2012 she has taught at the Institute for East European History at the University of Vienna.

== Life and works ==
Kerstin Susanne Jobst was born in Hamburg. Between 1982 and 1989 she studied History, Psychology, Literature and Finno-Ugristics at the University of Hamburg, with a couple of lengthy secondments at Vienna. She would later tell an interviewer that while still in the north studying for her first degree she resolved to try to build a career in the universities sector, and that the focus of her teaching and research would be on the history of Eastern Europe, ideally as a professor at the University of Vienna. Between 1989 and 1992, supported by a post-graduate stipendium from the Hamburg University Foundation and the Hamburg Rotary Foundation, she was able to study Slavistics and undertake further studies in preparations for higher academic qualification at the universities of Mainz, Krakow and Vienna. She then received support for her studies between 1991 and 1993 from the National Academy of Sciences of Ukraine, the Polish Academy of Sciences and the German Academic Exchange Service, enabling her to progress to her doctorate which she received in 1993 from the University of Hamburg in return for a dissertation dealing with Polish and Ukrainian Social democracy between 1890 and 1914 in the region known at the time as the Austro-Hungarian crown land of Galicia. The dissertation, published in 1996 (and online in 1998), carries the subtitle, "A contribution to the "Nationalities Question" under the Habsburg monarchy".

Both before and after receiving her doctorate, Jobst was employed, between 1992 and 1995, as a research assistant, and then as a researcher, at the Army University (" Helmut-Schmidt-Universität der Bundeswehr") in Hamburg. Between 1995 and 2002 she worked as a research assistant at the university. Her daughter was born in 2002. Between 2003 and 2004 she was in receipt of a research stipendium from the Düsseldorf-based Gerda Henkel Foundation. In 2005 Jobst confirmed her professional future as a university professor by obtaining her Habilitation (post-doctoral degree), again from the University of Hamburg. Her habilitation dissertation tackled the Russian "Crimea Dialogue" ("der Krim-Diskurs im Zarenreich"), the eighteenth and nineteenth century process through which Crimea was colonised by the Russian Empire. The dissertation was subsequently adapted and, in 2007, published as a book. The habilitation dissertation earned Jobst a "Venia Legendi", amounting to an authority to teach Modern and East European History at the University of Hamburg. Alongside her teaching duties at Hamburg, between 2006 and 2012 Jobst became a frequent presence at the Paris Lodron University of Salzburg, where she held a guest professorship. In Hamburg she renewed her links with the Army University, taking a teaching job on "History and Society in Eastern Europe" with the Sociology and Humanities section of the "Leadership Academy". In 2010 she also received a research stipendium for work at the Institute for Slavistics at the University of Leipzig, while taking an appointment as "visiting scholar" ("Gastwissenschaftlerin") at the Humanities Centre for Eastern European History and Culture (also at the University of Leipzig). Since August 2012 Kerstin Jobst has held the professorship for "Memory Societies and Cultures in Eastern Europe" at the University of Vienna Institute for Eastern European History. On the occasion of her tenth jubilee, a Festschrift was published in her honour.

The focus of Jobst's research is on the history of Eastern Central Europe and of Eastern Europe, the Black Sea and the Caucasus regions. She takes a particular interest in the Habsburg monarchy, comparative imperial and colonial research, religious history and hagiography, remembrance culture, the politics of history and the history of tourism in Eastern Europe. Another speciality is disaster research.

Kerstin Jobst is a co-publisher with Ulrich Hofmeister at the Vienna-based "Österreichische Zeitschrift für Geschichtswissenschaften" ("Austrian Journal of Historical Studies") in respect of Crimea, an area of study which acquired renewed topicality after 2014. She is a member of the Commission for the Southeast Europe - Turkey - Black Sea at the Austrian Academy of Sciences and Humanities ("Österreichische Akademie der Wissenschaften"), a member of the Austria-Russia Historians Commission (" Österreichisch-Russische Historikerkommission") and a member of the Military History Advisory Group at the Academicians Commission of the Austrian Defence (and between 2009 and 2018 Sports (Note: Until 1966 the sports agenda of the Austrian government was a direct responsibility of the chancellor's office. In 1966 "Sports" became a responsibility of the Education Ministry. After 1991 the government "Sports" portfolio was switched between government departments several times, being transferred in 2009 to the Defence Ministry. That changed again in 2018 when "Sports" was switched to a newly constituted Federal Ministry for Arts, Culture, the Civil Service and Sport.)) Ministry.

In 2020, Jobst wrote Geschichte der Krim: Iphigenie und Putin auf Tauris, which was translated into English as A History of Crimea: From Antiquity to the Present in 2025.
