= Joest =

Joest is a surname. Notable people with the surname include:

- Reinhold Joest (born 1937), former race car driver and current team owner
  - Joest Racing, the team founded by Reinhold Joest
- Jan Joest (died 1519), Dutch painter

== See also ==
- Jost, a surname
- Joesting, a surname
