= Jack Yost (footballer) =

Australian rules footballer

John Miles Yost (9 October 1923 – 23 June 1953) was an Australian rules footballer from Tasmania who represented the state at the 1950 Brisbane Carnival.

== Career ==
Between 1946 and 1952, Yost played for Launceston in the NTFA, making his debut on 27 April 1946 in a match versus North Launceston. He quickly established himself as a senior player, often being selected in the fullback position, a role he undertook in the state team at the 1950 Carnival and as a member of Launceston's 1951 premiership team.

== Illness and death ==
Yost became ill at the age of 29 and died in June 1953.
