= Ioes Karest =

Flemish harpsichord maker

Ioes Karest (before 1500 – c.1560), also known as Joos Karest, was a Flemish harpsichord builder.

Karest was born in Cologne sometime before 1500. By 1517 he was living and working in Antwerp, and was admitted to the Guild of St. Luke by 1523. In 1557, he, along with nine other builders, petitioned the Guild to regulate and control harpsichord building; their request was granted the following year.

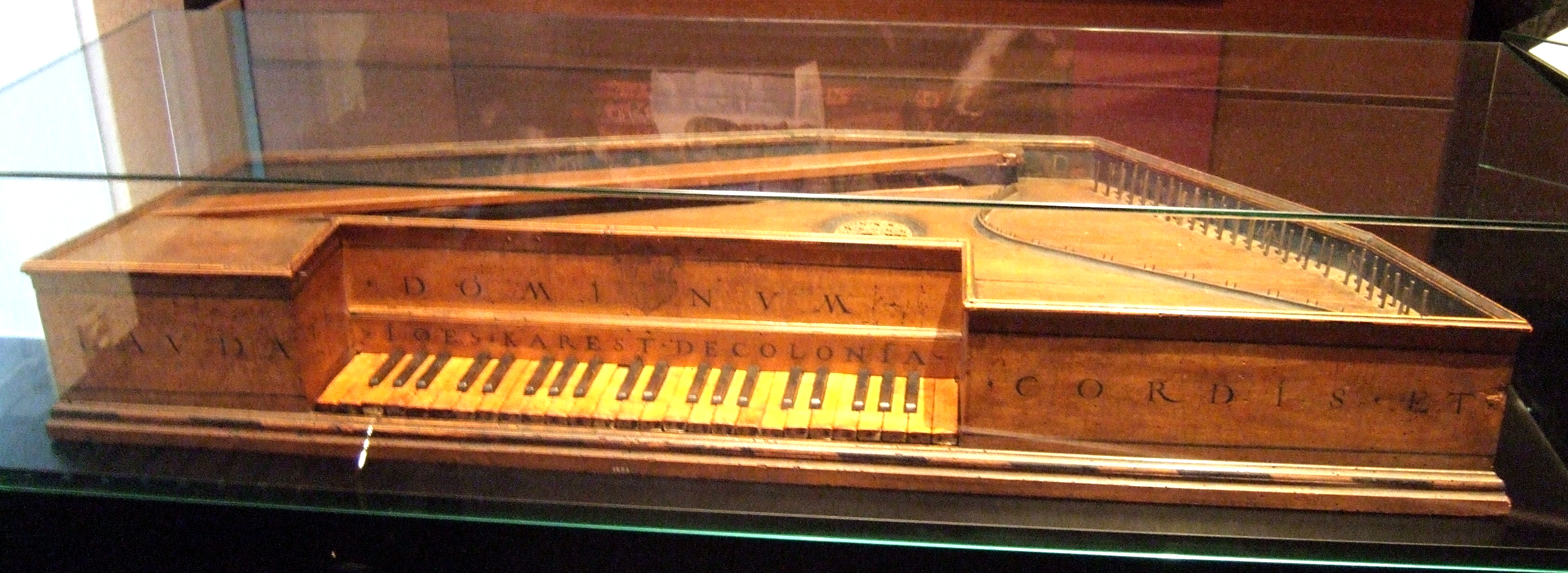
The 1548 Karest Virginal in the Musical Instrument Museum, Brussels

Ioes’ brother Goosen had been admitted to the Guild as an apprentice painter, but was apprenticed to Ioes from 1539 to 1542 in order to qualify as a harpsichord builder. Boalch states that Ioes and Goosen were sons of organbuilder Hans van Cuelen (before 1500 – c.1560), but Kottick points out that there is no evidence to back this claim.

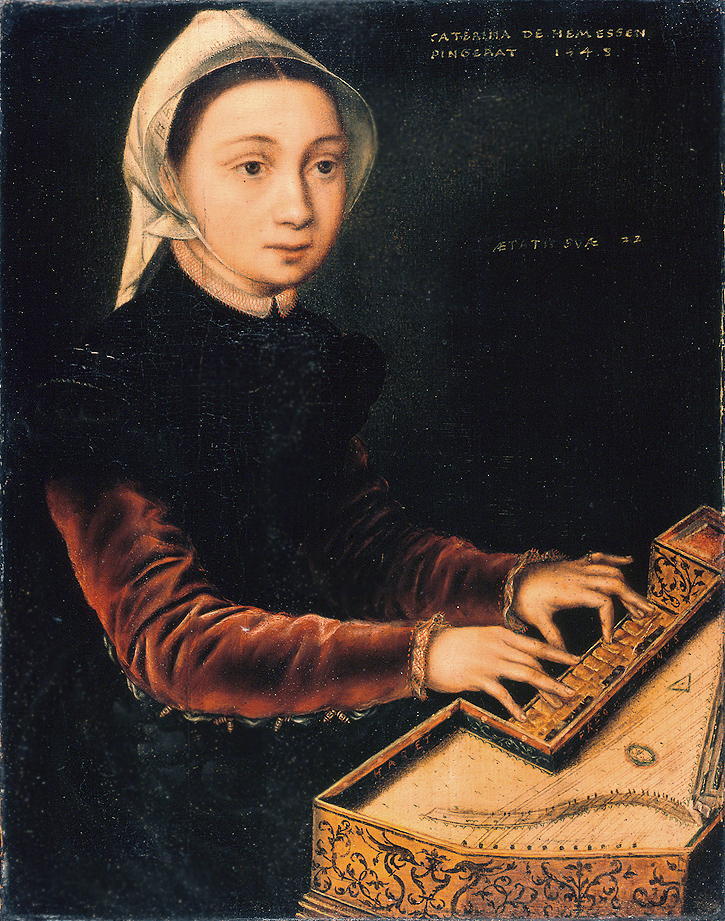
This portrait by Caterina van Hemessen was painted in 1548, the same year one of Karest’s surviving virginals was built. The instrument depicted is very similar to those of Karest.

Two instruments by Ioes Karest have survived; both are polygonal virginals. Both have sides of thin maple or sycamore, inset keyboards, and soundboards of spruce or fir. They both also feature applied moldings that outline the case at top and bottom.

The first instrument, built in 1548, is the smaller of the two. It has the range C/E – c´´´ (four octaves), which was to become the standard range of Flemish instruments of the 1600s. The case is unpainted, but Latin mottoes run round the interior above the soundboard and the exterior. The soundboard carries two decorative roses, one round and one in the shape of a Gothic window; there are faint traces of painted soundboard decoration.

The second instrument, dated 1550, is slightly larger, and probably sounded at 8´ pitch. Unlike the 1548 instrument, one of its side panels is curved. The range is C – f´´´, with C# lacking, similar to that of some contemporary Italian harpsichords. The soundboard is painted with flowers and blue borders, and carries two round roses. In contrast to the 1548 instrument, the exterior of this one is decorated with an intricate painted design similar to the printed “seahorse” papers that were to adorn later Flemish keyboard instruments.

Kottick states that:

The Karest instruments represent the first physical evidence we have of the establishment of a Flemish school of virginal building.

The 1548 instrument is currently in the Musical Instrument Museum in Brussels; the 1550 virginal is in the collection of Rome’s Museo Nazionale degli Strumenti Musicali.

== See also ==
- List of historical harpsichord makers
