= Jobst Kuch =

German painter (1902–1963)

- Born: 26 October 1902; Nuremberg, Germany
- Died: 23 May 1963 (aged 60); Fürth, Germany
- Occupation: Painter

Jobst Kuch (26 October 1902 – 23 May 1963) was a German painter. His work was part of the painting event in the art competition at the 1936 Summer Olympics.
