= Christopher Yost (biologist) =

Canadian biologist

Christopher Yost (/joʊst/) is a Canadian biologist, currently a Canada Research Chair in Microbes, the Environment and Food Safety at University of Regina.
