= Joos van Cleve =

Flemish painter (c. 1485–1490 – 1540/1541)

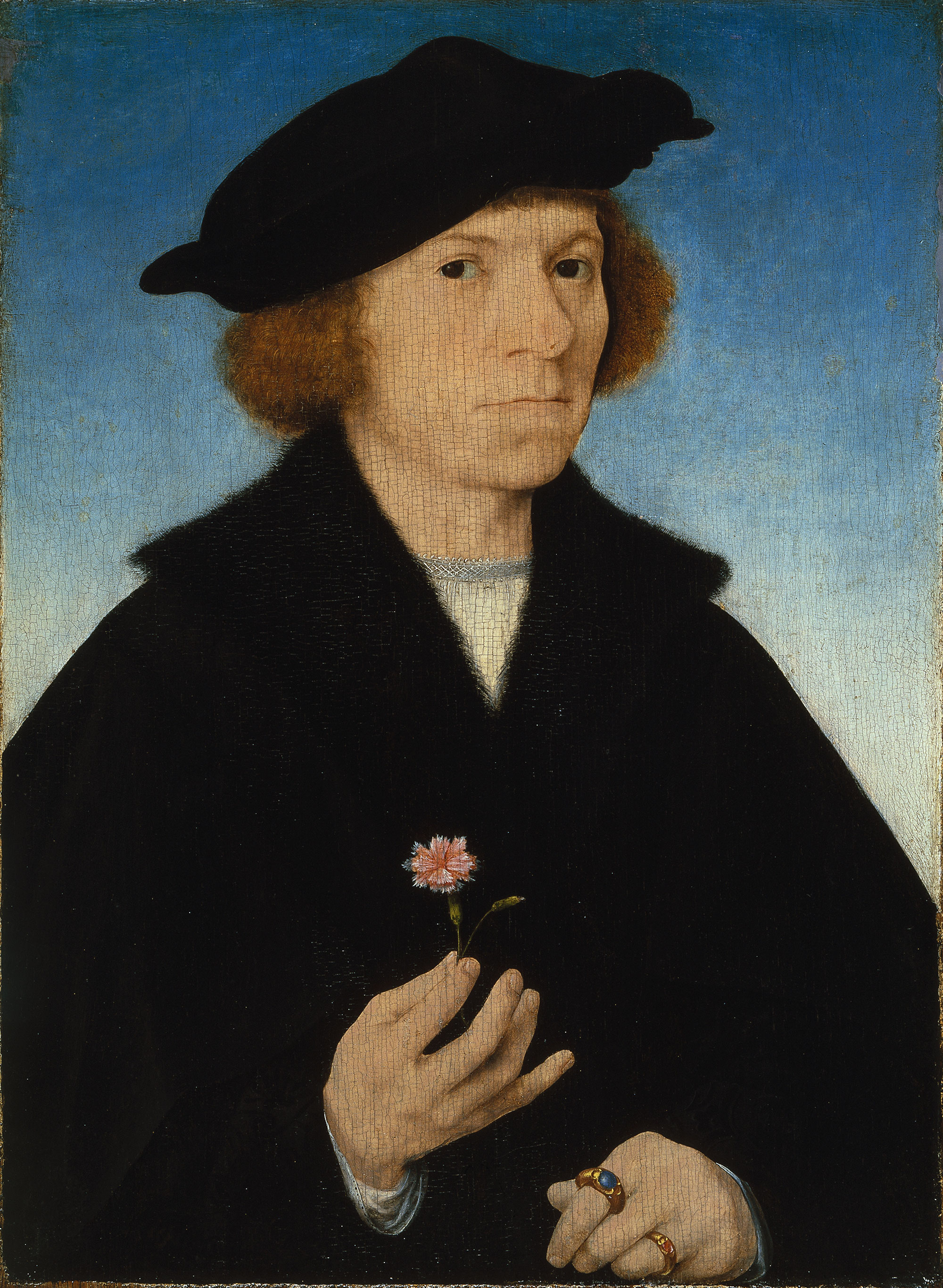
Self-Portrait

Joos van Cleve (/ˈkleɪvə/; also Joos van der Beke; c. 1485–1490 – 1540/1541) was a leading painter active in Antwerp from his arrival there around 1511 until his death in 1540 or 1541. Within Dutch and Flemish Renaissance painting, he combines the traditional techniques of Early Netherlandish painting with influences of more contemporary Renaissance painting styles.

An active member and co-deacon of the Guild of Saint Luke of Antwerp, he is known mostly for his religious works and portraits, some of royalty. He ran a large workshop, with at least five pupils and other assistants, which produced paintings in a variety of styles over his career. As a skilled technician, his art shows sensitivity to color and a unique solidarity of figures. His style is highly eclectic: he was one of the first to introduce broad world landscapes in the backgrounds of his paintings, sometimes collaborating with Joachim Patinir, which would become a popular technique of sixteenth century northern Renaissance paintings. Some works reflect the popular style of Antwerp Mannerism, while others are variations on early Netherlandish masters of two or more generations before, or reflect recent Italian painting.

Four of his more important paintings have the monogram "JB", presumably for Joos van der Beke, rather inconspicuously placed. In three other works a self-portrait is placed among the minor figures. From the seventeenth to the nineteenth centuries, the name of Joos van Cleve as an artist was lost. Some of the paintings now attributed to Joos van Cleve were, at that time, known as the works of the "Master of the Death of the Virgin", after the triptych in the Wallraf-Richartz-Museum in Cologne. In 1894 it was discovered that the monogram on the back of the triptych was that of Joos van der Beke, the real name of Joos van Cleve. His oeuvre was reconstructed in the 1920s and 1930s by Ludwig von Baldass and Max Jakob Friedländer. Now over 300 works are generally attributed to him or his workshop, which vary considerably in both quality and style.

He was the father of Cornelis van Cleve (1520–1567) who also became a painter, and inherited the workshop. Cornelis became mentally ill during a residence in England and was therefore referred to as 'Sotte Cleef' (mad Cleef).

== Life ==
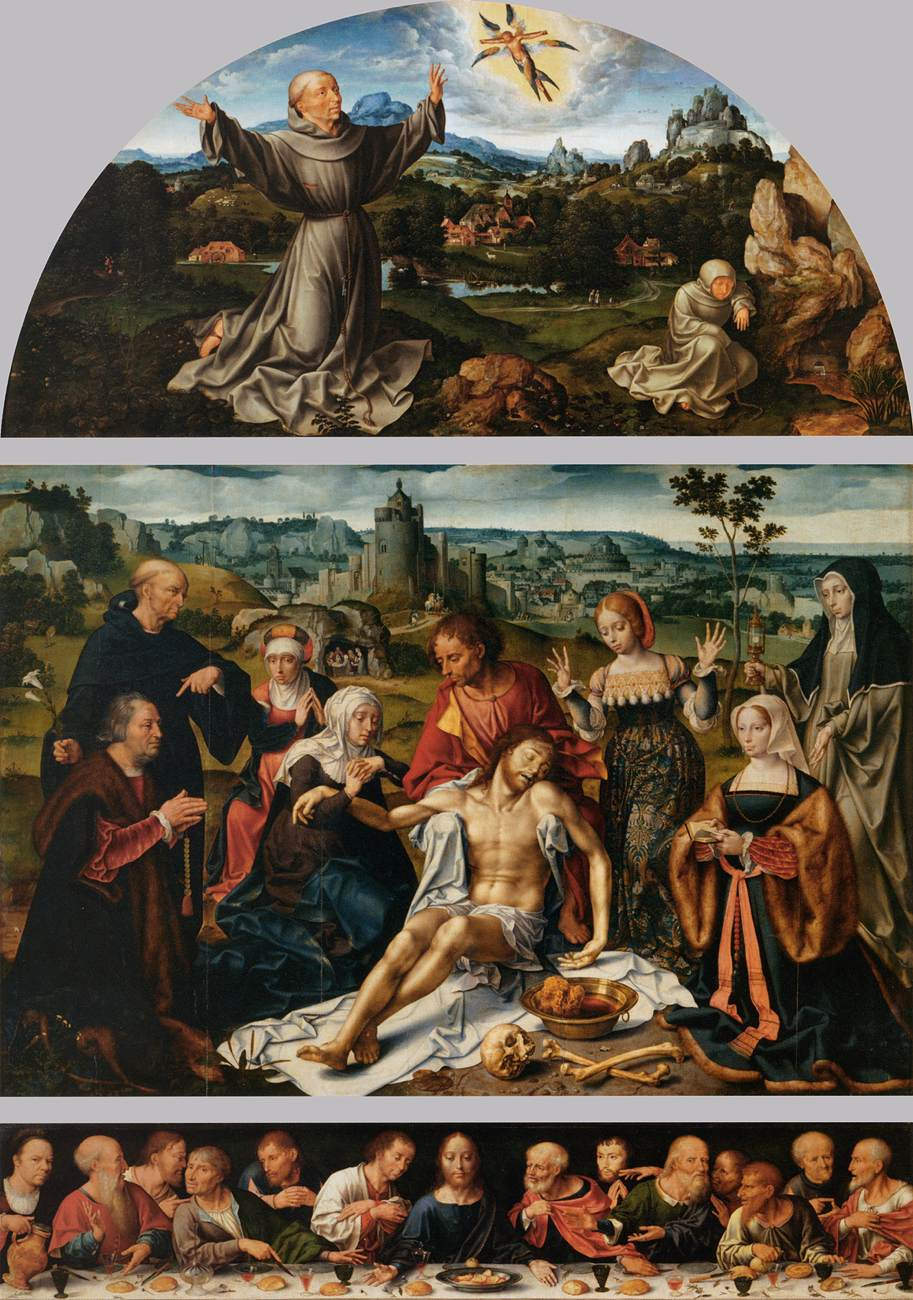
Altarpiece of the Lamentation, 1520–1525

Joos van Cleve was born around 1485–90. The birthplace of Joos van Cleve is not precisely known. In various Antwerp legal documents he is referred to as 'Joos van der Beke alias van Cleve'. It is therefore likely that he came from the Lower Rhenish region or city named Kleve (in traditional English "Cleves"), from which his name is derived. It is assumed that he began his artistic training around 1505 in the workshop of Jan Joest, whom he assisted in the panel paintings of the wings for the high altar of the Nikolaikirche in Kalkar, Lower Rhine, Germany, from 1506 to 1509. These include one of his self-portraits. From this a birth date of about 1485 to 1490 is inferred.

Joos van Cleve is believed to have moved to Bruges between 1507 and 1511 since his painting style is similar to that of the painters of Bruges. Later he moved to Antwerp, and in 1511 became a free master in the Antwerp Guild of Saint Luke. He was co-deacon of the guild for several years around 1520, along with registering pupils there at various dates between 1516 and 1536. In 1528 he bought a house from his wife's parents. As there are no records of his being in Antwerp between 1529 and 1534, it is possible he spent some of this time in Italy or France at the court, or even London.

From surviving documents it is clear that he was alive in Antwerp on 10 November 1540 and dead by 4 February 1541.

=== Personal life ===
He had two children from his first marriage, a daughter and a son. His son named Cornelis (1520) became a painter. Although the date of his death is unknown, Joos van Cleve drew up a will and testament on 10 November 1540, and his second wife was listed as a widow in April 1541.

There are a number of other "van Cleef" Antwerp painters recorded from his time, some of whom may have been relatives.

== Work ==
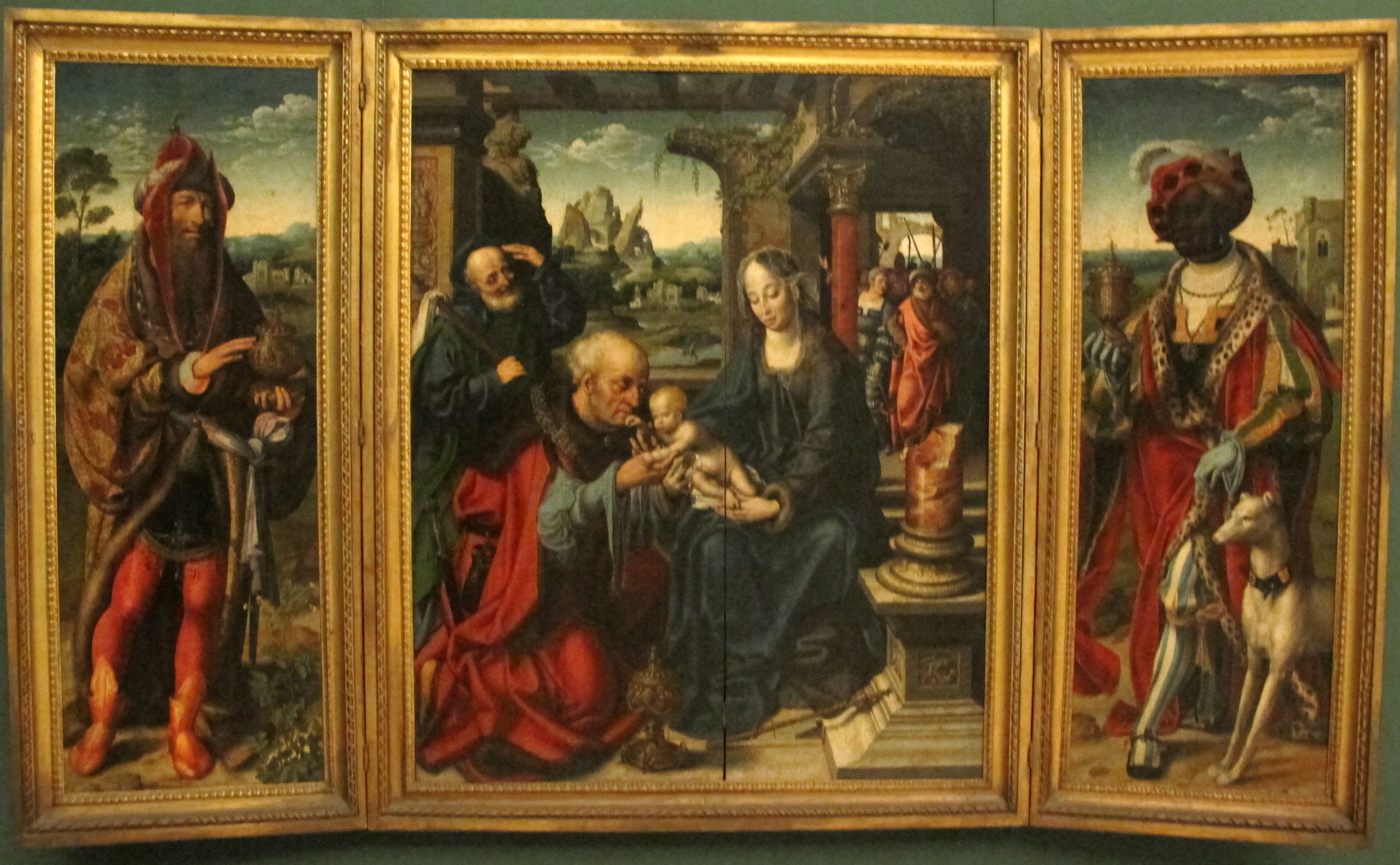
Adoration of the Magi triptych, apparently the prime version, Museo di Capodimonte, Naples, c. 1515

Compositions were often copied, repeated or adapted; for example at least six versions of an Adoration of the Magi triptych composition by him and his workshop are known, though varying considerably in size, with the widths of the centre panel ranging from 56 to 93 cm. This probably reflected different intended sites for the paintings, from private house chapels to churches.

Numerous paintings contain heraldry, which often enables the customers to be identified, including eleven of the twenty-one altarpieces attributed to the workshop. In other works the identity of local saints gives clues. Antwerp was the centre of European trade in the period, and the Antwerp merchant class was highly cosmopolitan. Five paintings can be linked with Italy, especially Genoa, and others to Cologne (three altarpieces) and Danzig in Germany, and four to various Netherlandish cities. Others have the arms of his homeland Mark-Cleves, the territories of John III, Duke of Cleves, and the Holy Roman Empire, suggesting the duke or a close courtier. Three paintings delivered to King Francois I of France are recorded.

The great majority of his work is religious subjects or portraits, with the main exceptions being versions of the Suicide of Lucretia, and a Leonardo-esque half-length nude, the Mona Vanna in the National Gallery in Prague.

In January 2021 an episode the BBC Four series Britain's Lost Masterpieces, centred on the fine art collection of the Royal Pavilion in Brighton, uncovered a work of Joos van Cleve, a portrayal of Balthazar, previously attributed to Bernard van Orley. The painting had once been the left-hand door of a folding altarpiece triptych.

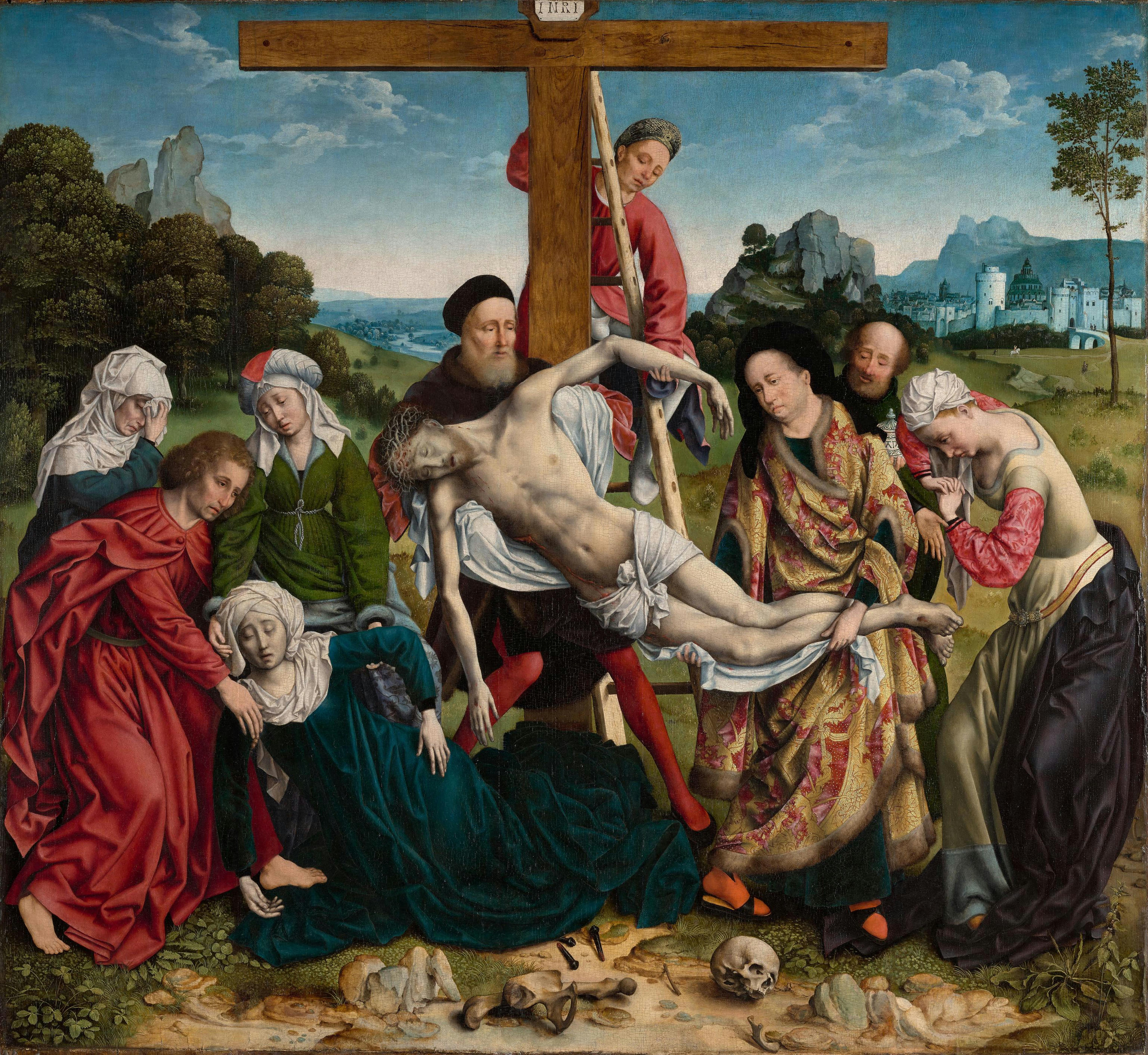
Descent from the Cross, Rogier van der Weyden's figures (Prado), given a landscape background.

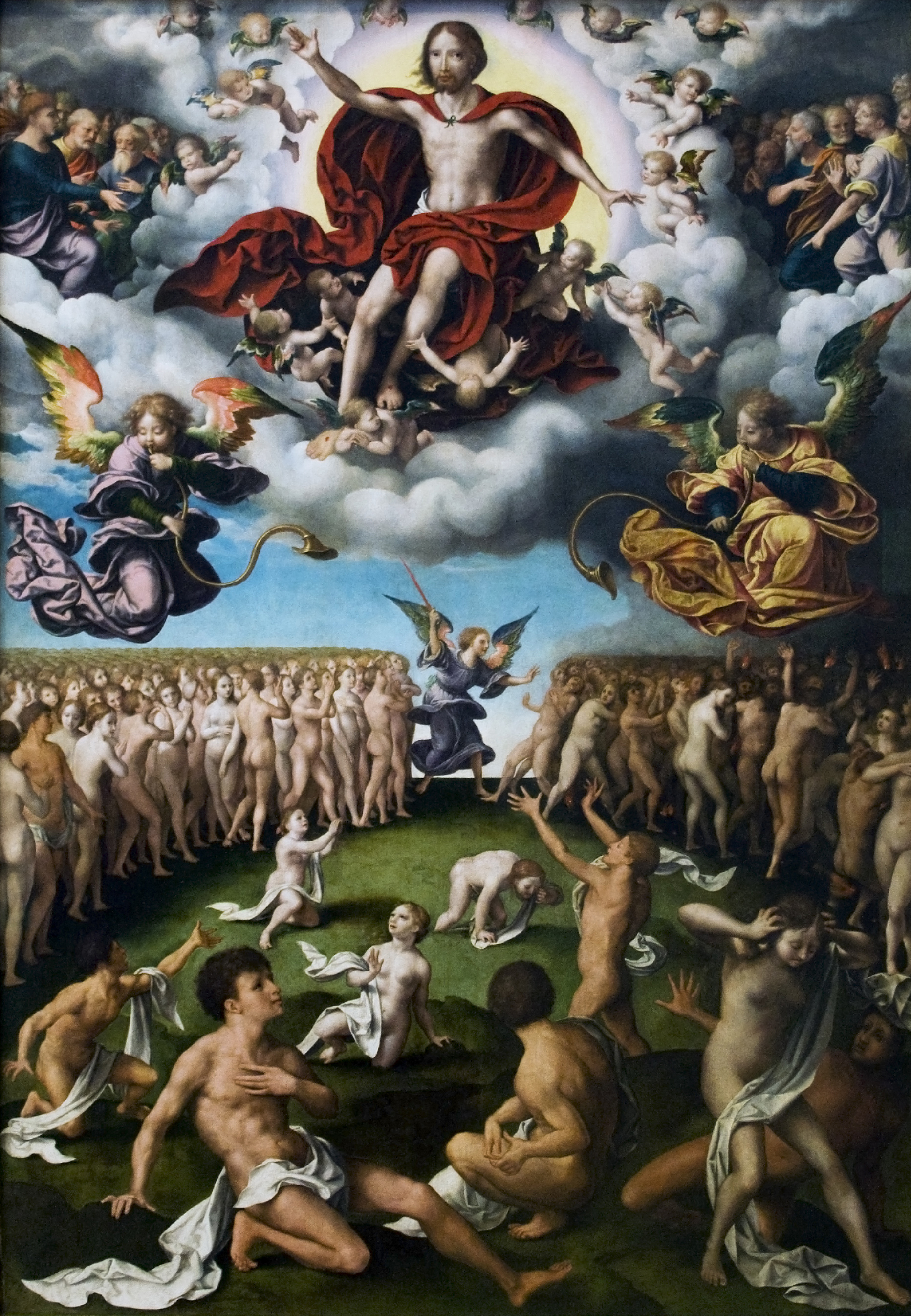
The Last Judgment, oil on panel, 123.8 cm (48.7 in) high

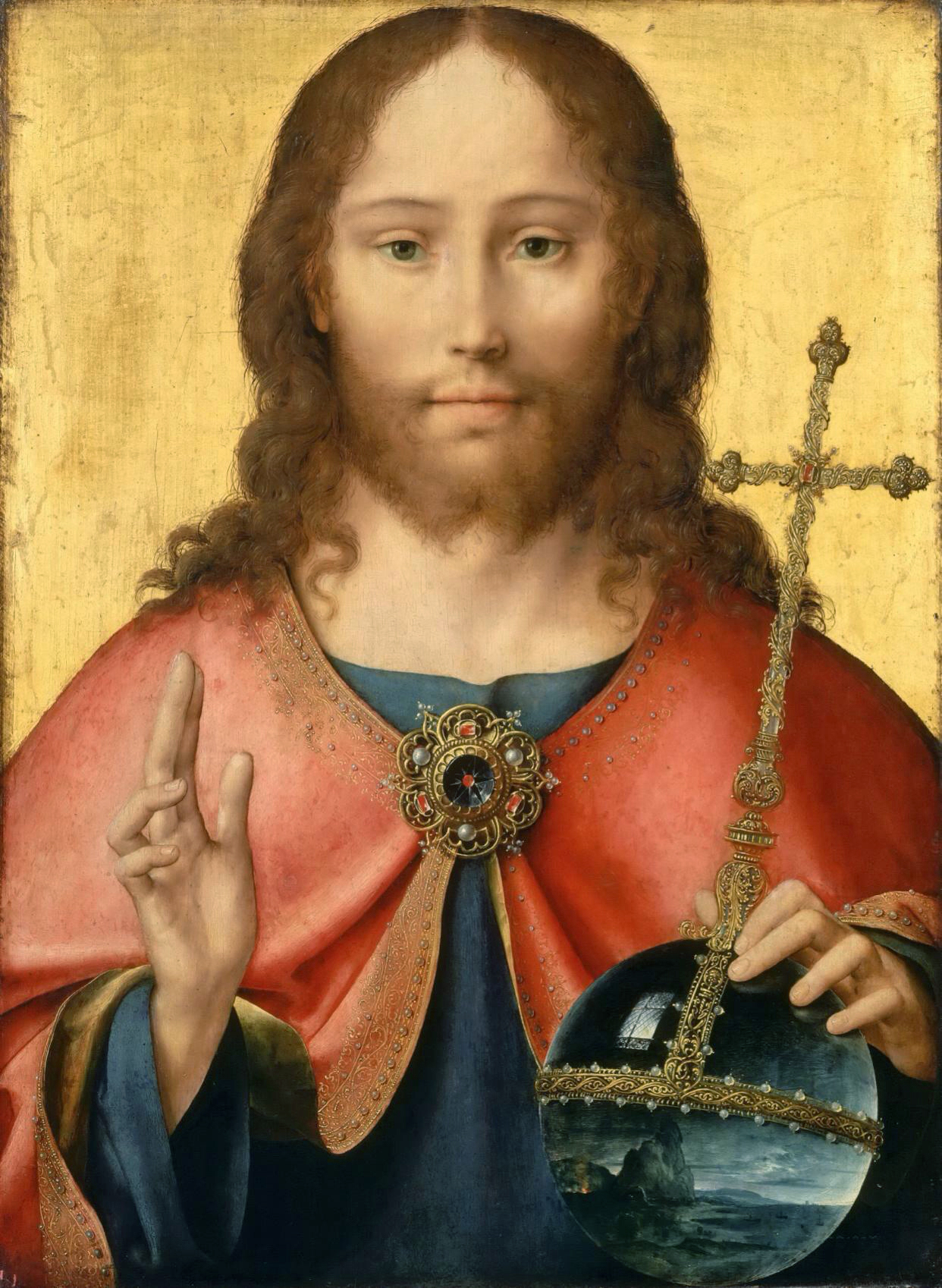
Salvator Mundi, c.1516-18, Louvre

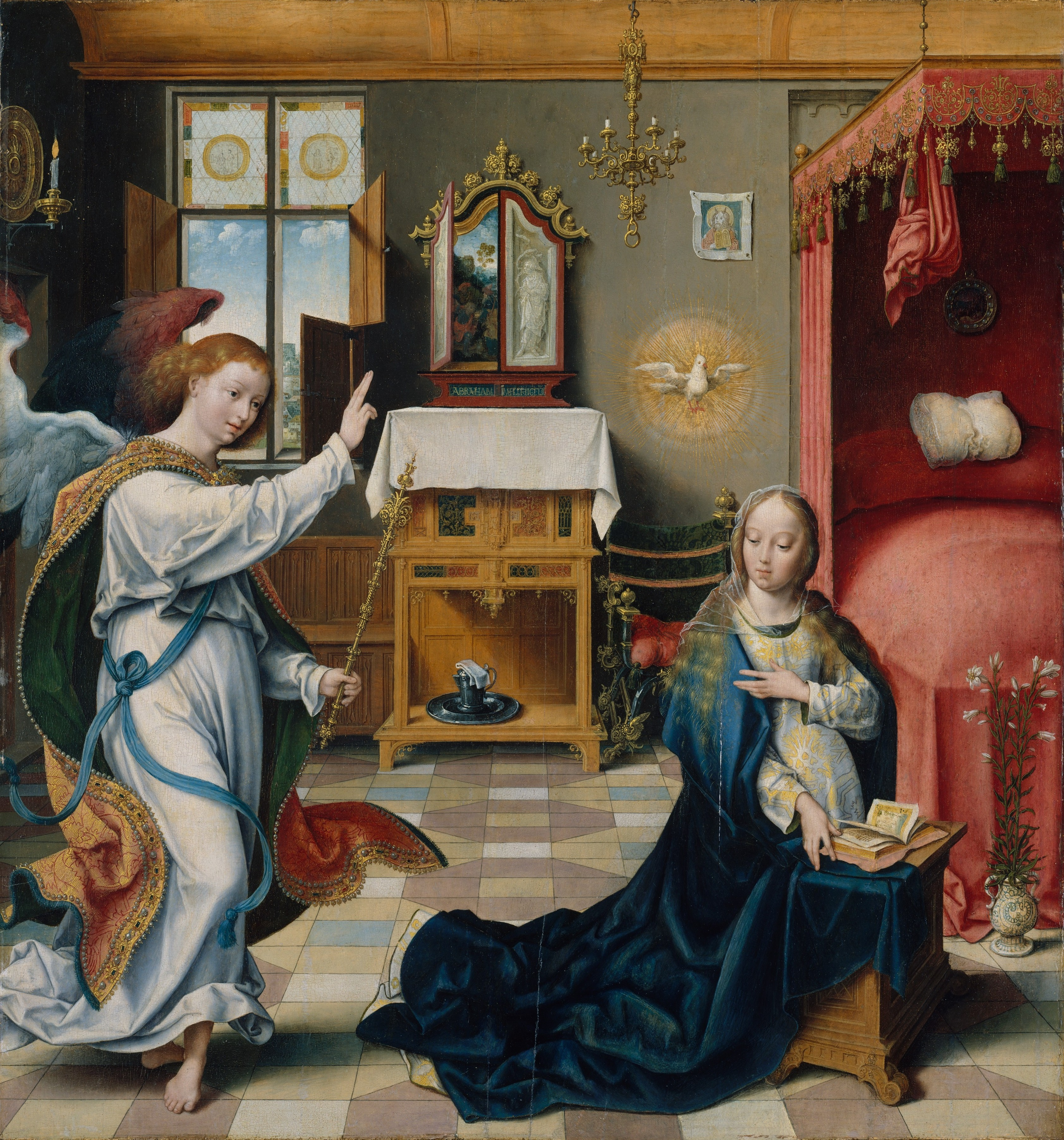
Annunciation; Italianate figure style, with the Early Netherlandish domestic setting of works such as the Mérode Altarpiece of Robert Campin, c. 1525

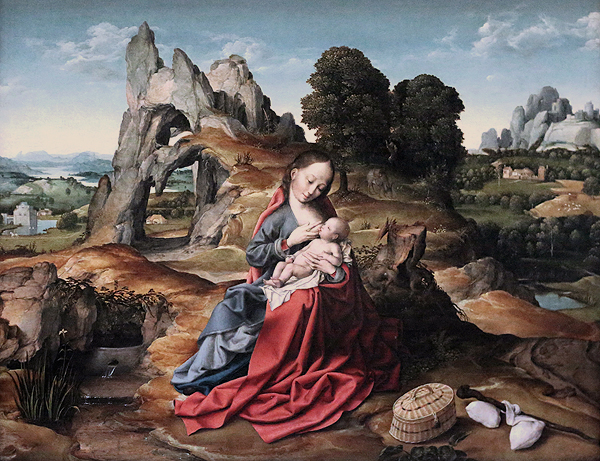
Rest on the Flight into Egypt, Royal Museums of Fine Arts of Belgium

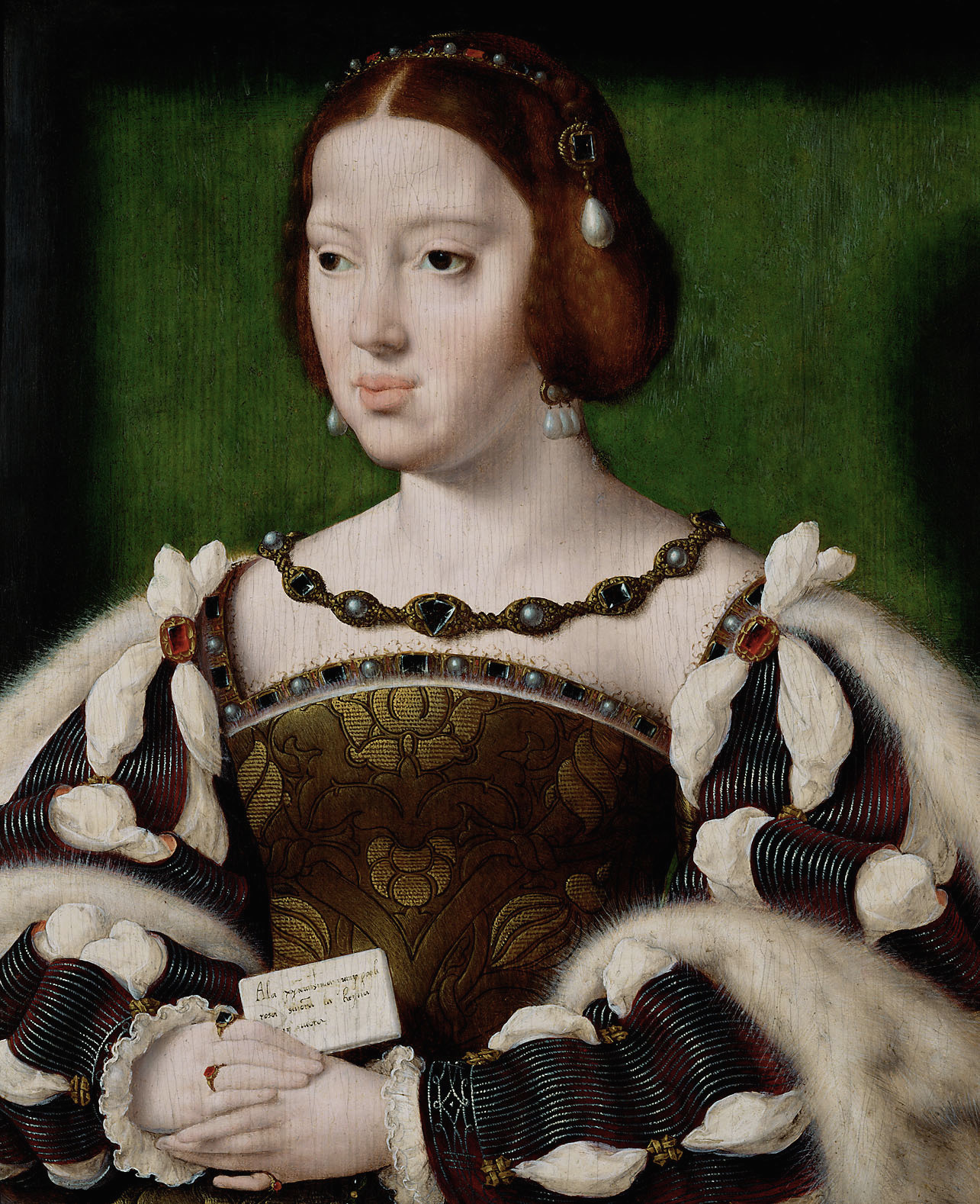
Portrait of Eleonore of Austria, Queen of France, c. 1530

=== Artistic influences ===
The influence of Kalkar and Bruges are seen in many of Joos van Cleve's early works, such as Adam and Eve (1507). The Death of the Virgin (1520) shows the combined influence of several artists. It has the intense emotionality of Hugo van der Goes, and iconographic ideas of Jan van Eyck and Robert Campin. A strong influence of Italian art combined with Joos van Cleve's own color and light sensitivity make his works especially unique. The "Antwerp Mannerist" style is identifiable in the Adoration of the Magi. It is thought that the "Antwerp Mannerists" were in turn influenced by Joos van Cleve.

Like Quentin Matsys, a fellow artist active in Antwerp, Joos van Cleve appropriated themes and techniques of Leonardo da Vinci. This is apparent in the use of sfumato in the Virgin and Child. Multiple versions of a soft, sentimental Madonna and Child and the Holy Family were discovered, produced in his workshop.

=== Royal portraits ===
Joos van Cleve's skills as a portrait artist were highly regarded as demonstrated by a summons to the court of Francis I of France. There he painted the king (Philadelphia Museum of Art), the queen Eleanor of Austria (Kunsthistorisches Museum) and other members of the court. His portrait of Henry VIII of England is of comparable size to that of Francis I (72.1 x 59.2 cm) and the compositions and costumes in both portraits are similar. Some historians have interpreted this as evidence that the portraits were pendants painted to commemorate the meeting of the two kings in Calais and Boulogne on 21 and 29 October 1532, which Joos might possibly have witnessed. Other historians have proposed the alternative view that van Cleve based the Henry VIII portrait on that of Francis I without meeting the English king. He may have hoped that this gesture might earn him English royal commissions in future.

=== Virgin and Child and Holy Family ===
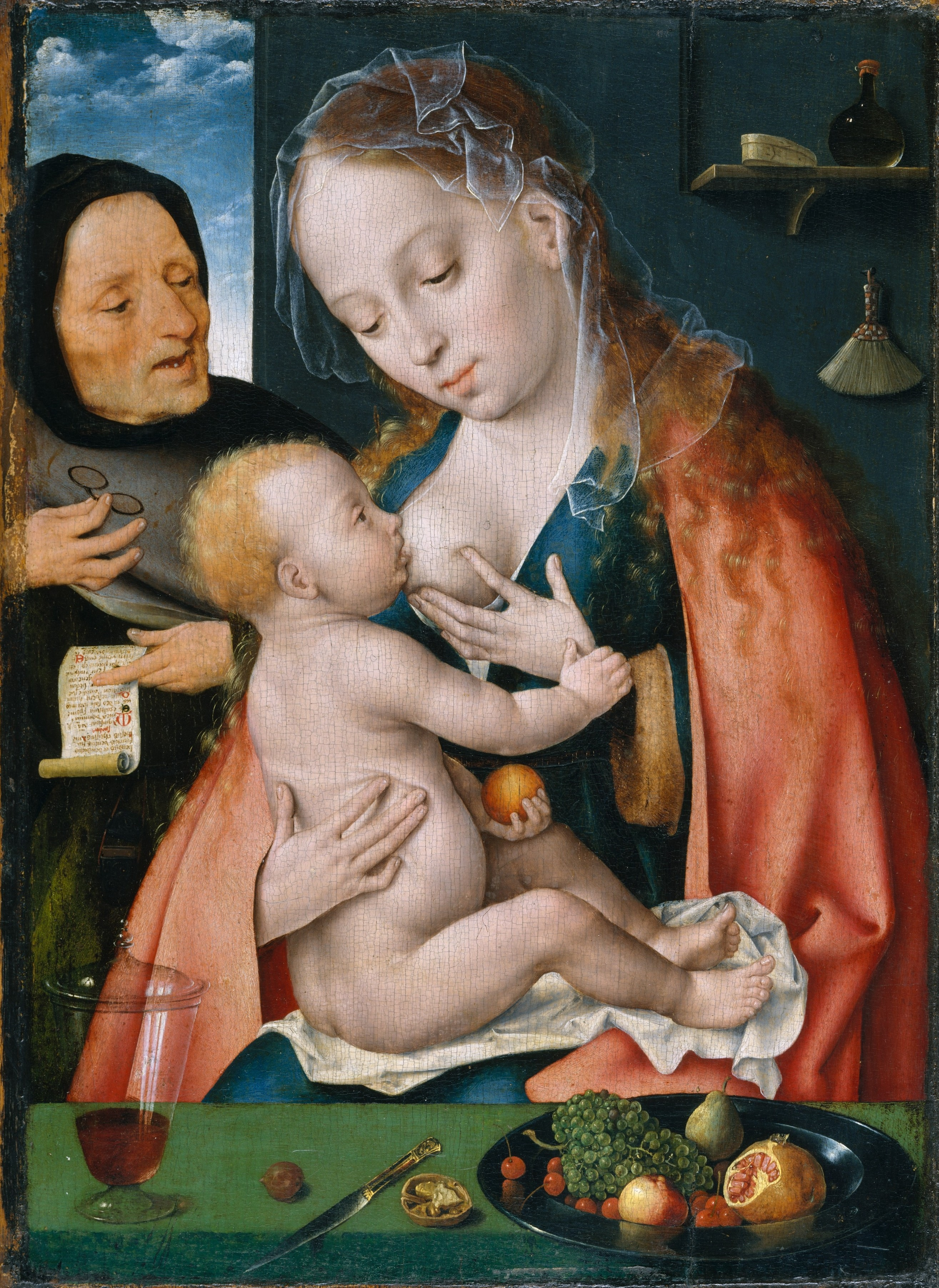
The Holy Family, Metropolitan Museum of Art

Small devotional pictures of the Virgin Mary were the bread and butter work of early 15th century painting workshops, and Joos van Cleve produced many different types of the Virgin and Child, the Holy Family and the Virgin and Child with St Anne. In some instances the prime version has been lost, but the type can be recovered through the numerous replicas produced by his workshop and copyists. Most of these were no doubt produced with no specific commission, with many distributed by agents and dealers across Europe, for the houses of the wealthy.

The Holy Family was a newly popular subject in small devotional paintings, reflecting increased theological and devotional interest in the role of Saint Joseph. One of the earliest examples of the new type is the painting by Joos dated to c. 1512 at the New York Metropolitan Museum of Art. This essentially reduced the figures from Jan van Eyck's Lucca Madonna (c. 1435, Städel, Frankfurt) to a close-up with domestic still life details, and added Saint Joseph over the Virgin's shoulder. The wine and fruits on the foreground are a reference to Christ's incarnation and future sacrifice. They also hint at the emerging genre of still-life painting in Flanders.

Another of the many compositional types exists in very similar versions, one in the Museum of Fine Arts, Budapest and another sold at Sotheby's on 30 January 2014. It is full of charm and tenderness and was popular in his own time as well as with later collectors. The composition shows the Virgin with a brilliant red cloak, lined with fur and elaborately embroidered with pearls along the outside edge. The Virgin is seated in a loggia-like space with open windows through which a distant mountainous landscape is visible. She has her lips parted in a slight smile while she helps the Christ Child drink from a glass with red wine, a symbol of Christ's future suffering and blood and the Eucharist. Characteristic of Netherlandish painting of this period are the jewel-like colours and the details of the Virgin's costume and brocade pillow in the foreground.

A new devotional type of the Virgin alone, her hands clasped in prayer, also appears in many versions. This may be called a Mater Dolorosa.

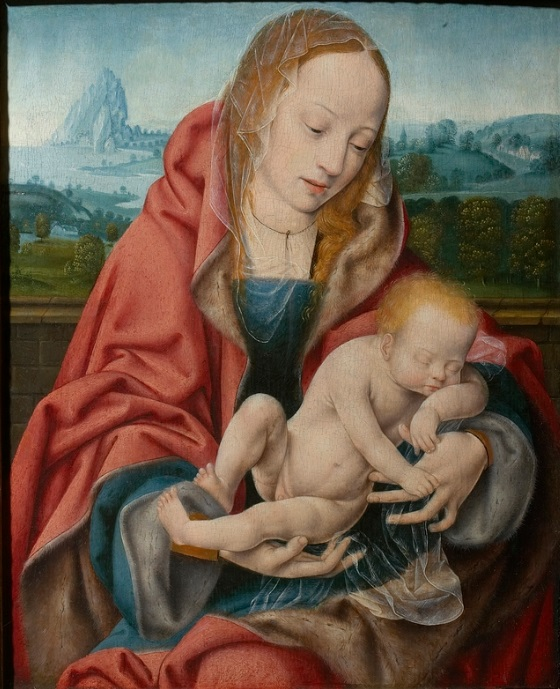
Madonna and Sleeping Child in a Landscape, 1515–1520

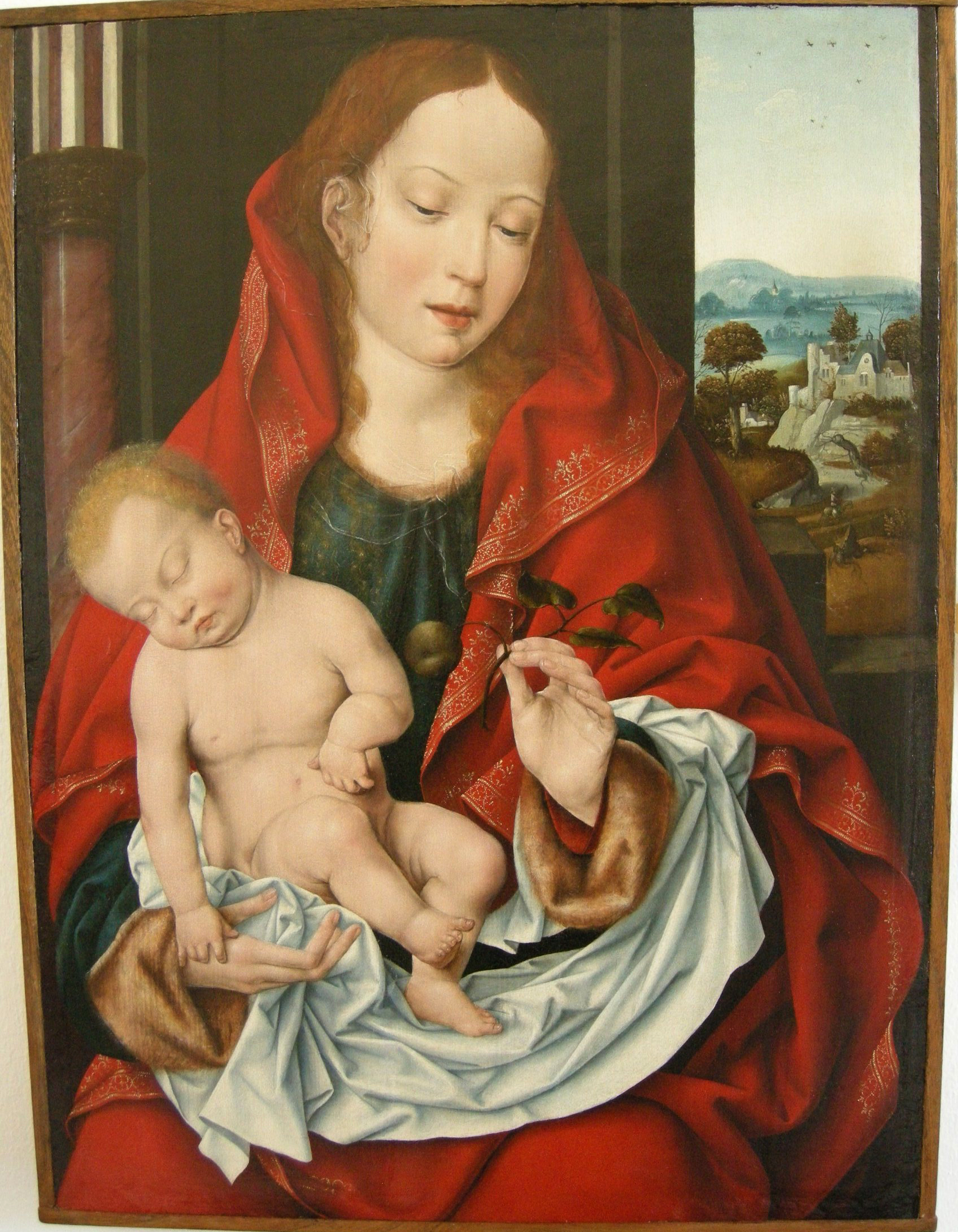
Genoa, Palazzo Bianco

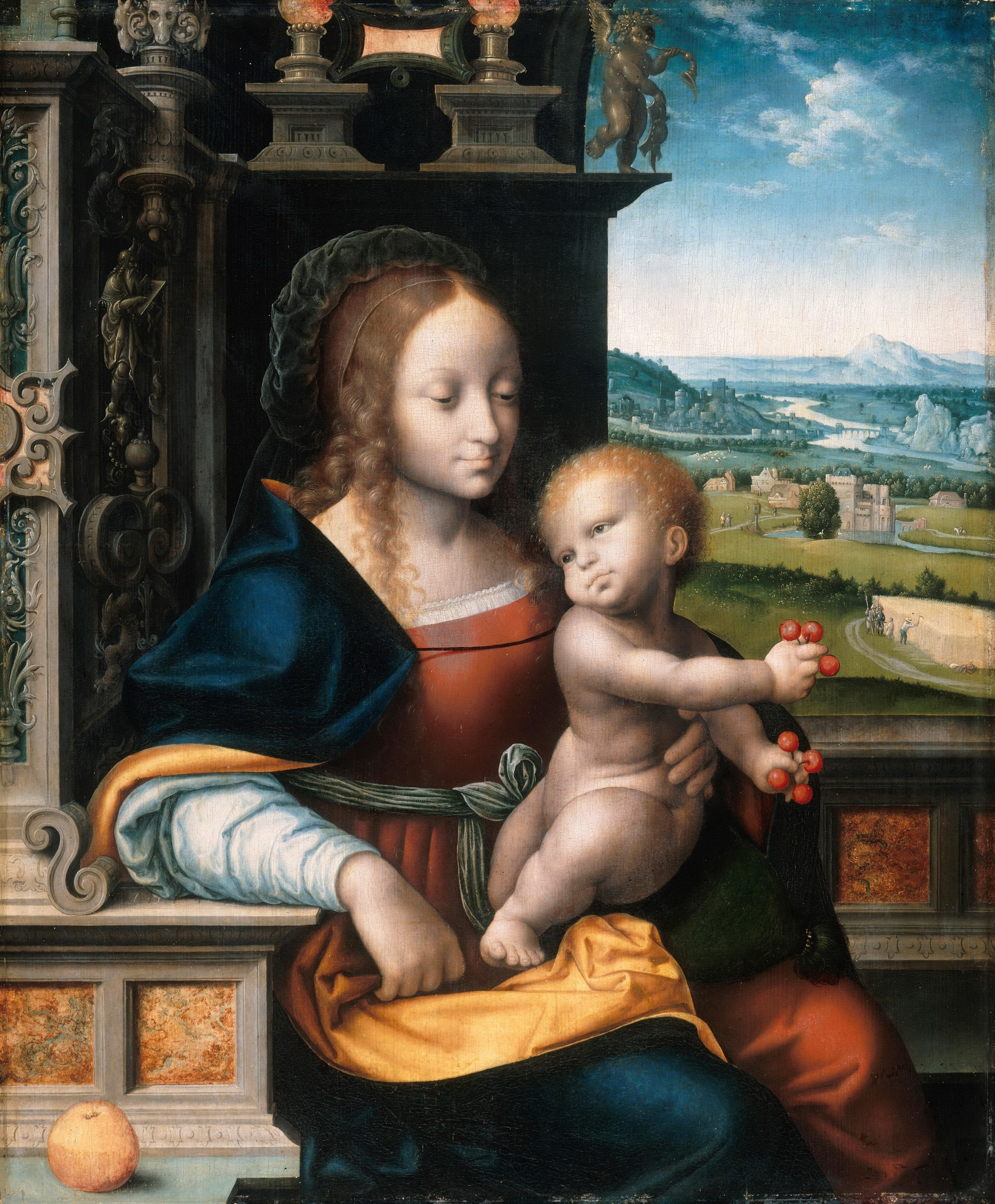
Leonardo-esque Madonna of the Cherries, Berlin, c. 1525

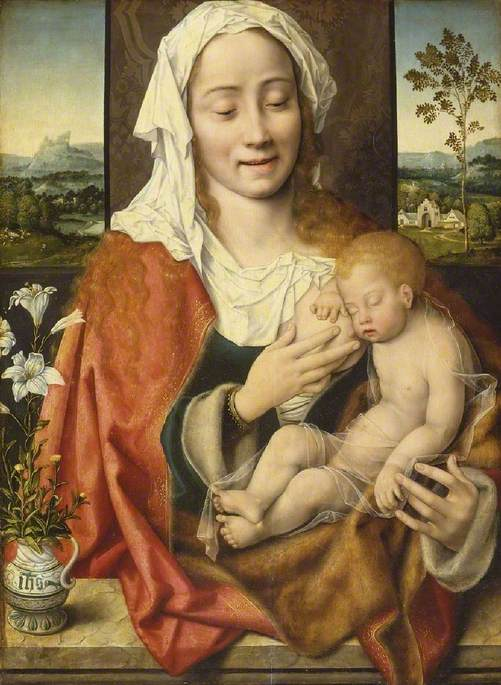
Fitzwilliam Museum, c. 1525–30

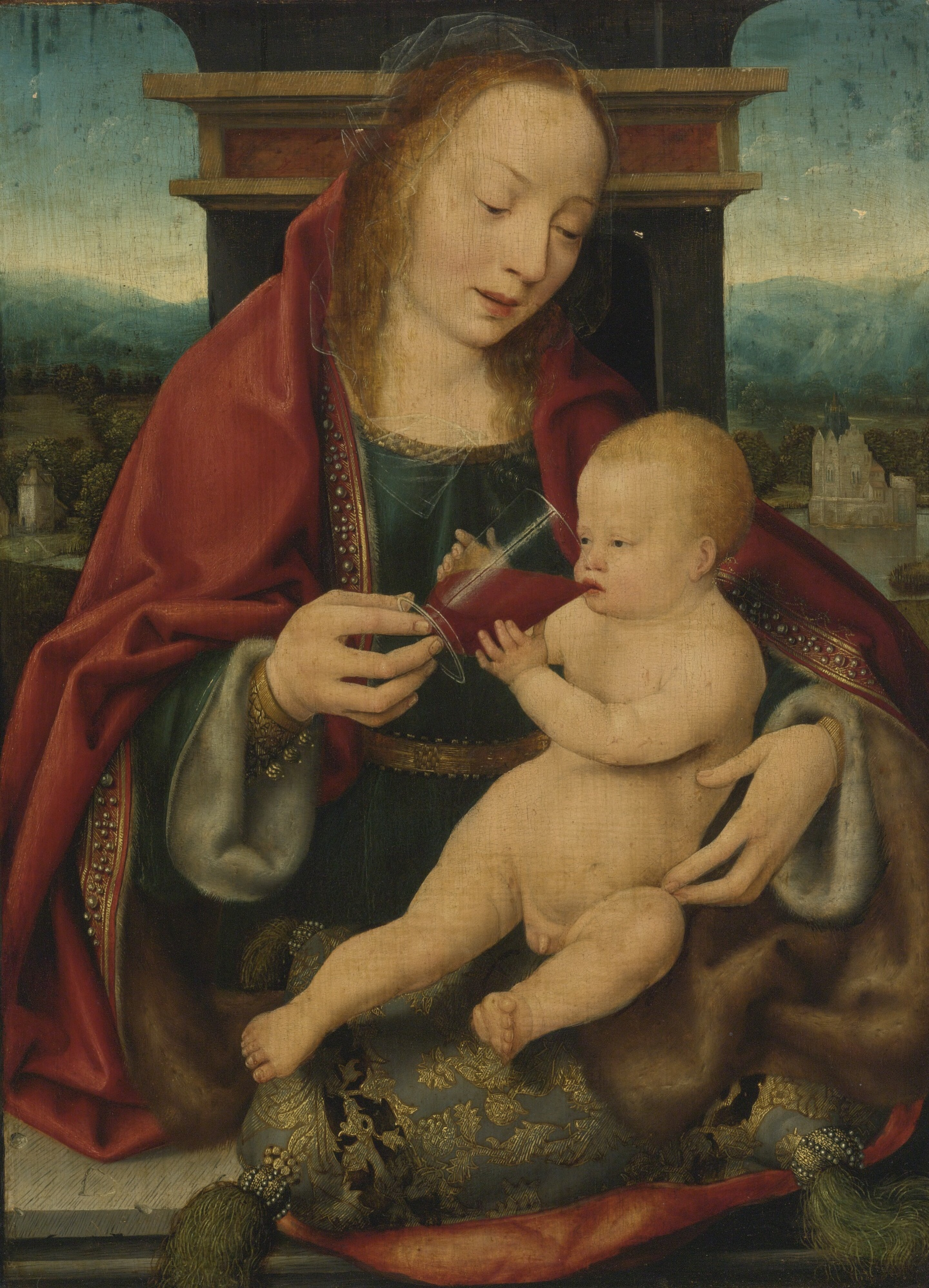
With wine-drinking Child, sold Sotheby's, 2014

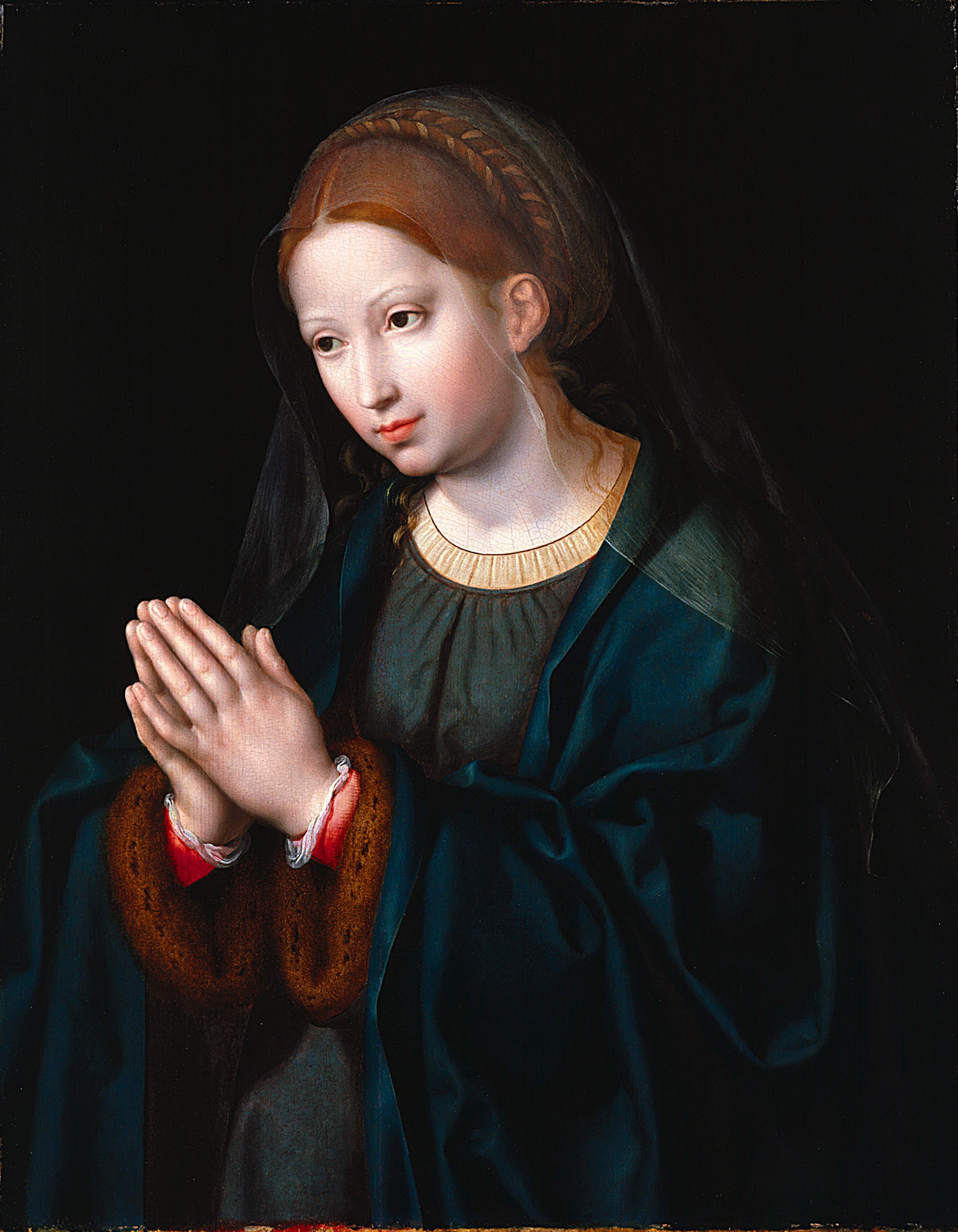
The Virgin in Prayer, Minneapolis Institute of Arts

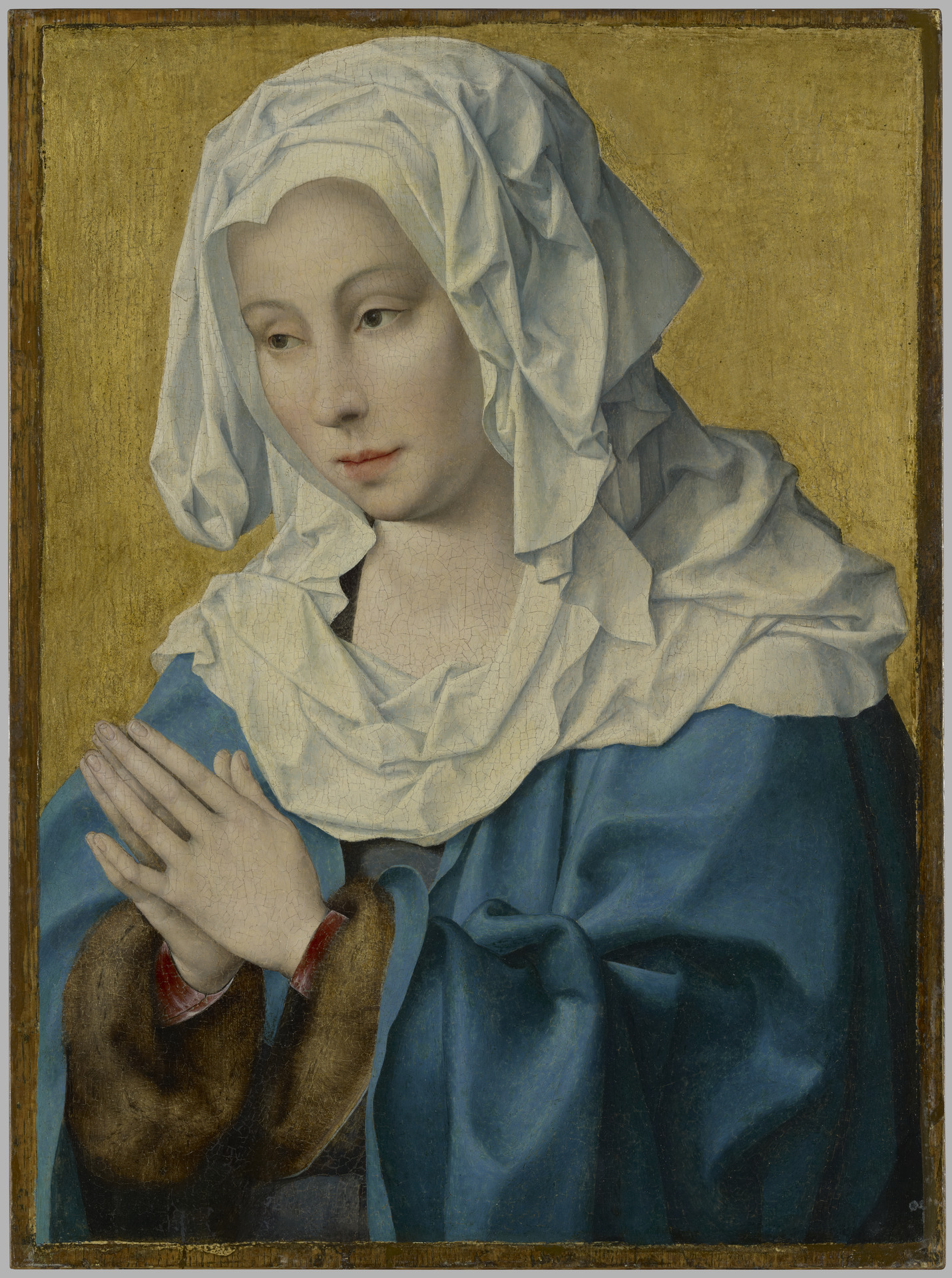
The Virgin in Prayer, Yale

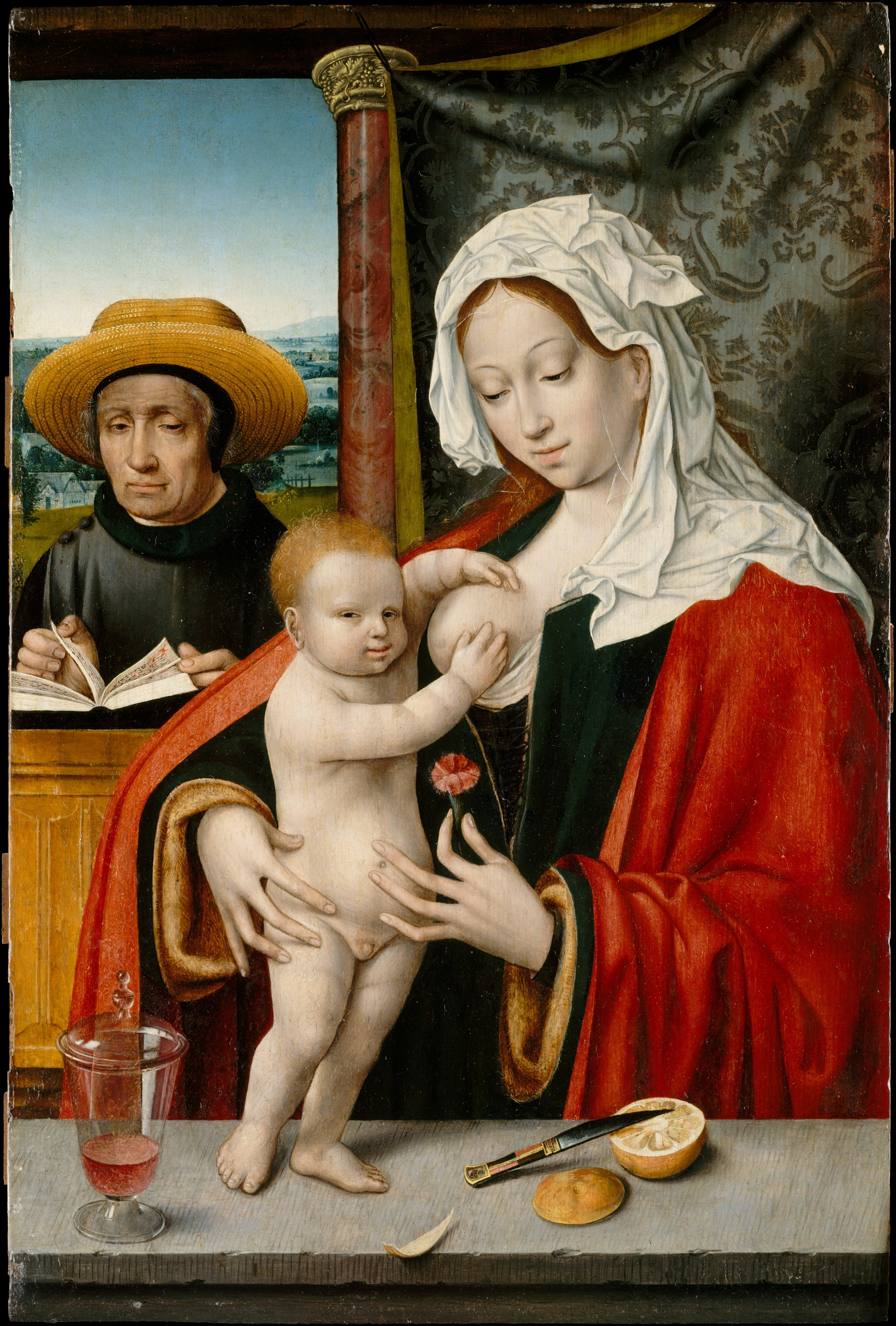
Another Holy Family type found in many versions

=== Saint Jerome ===
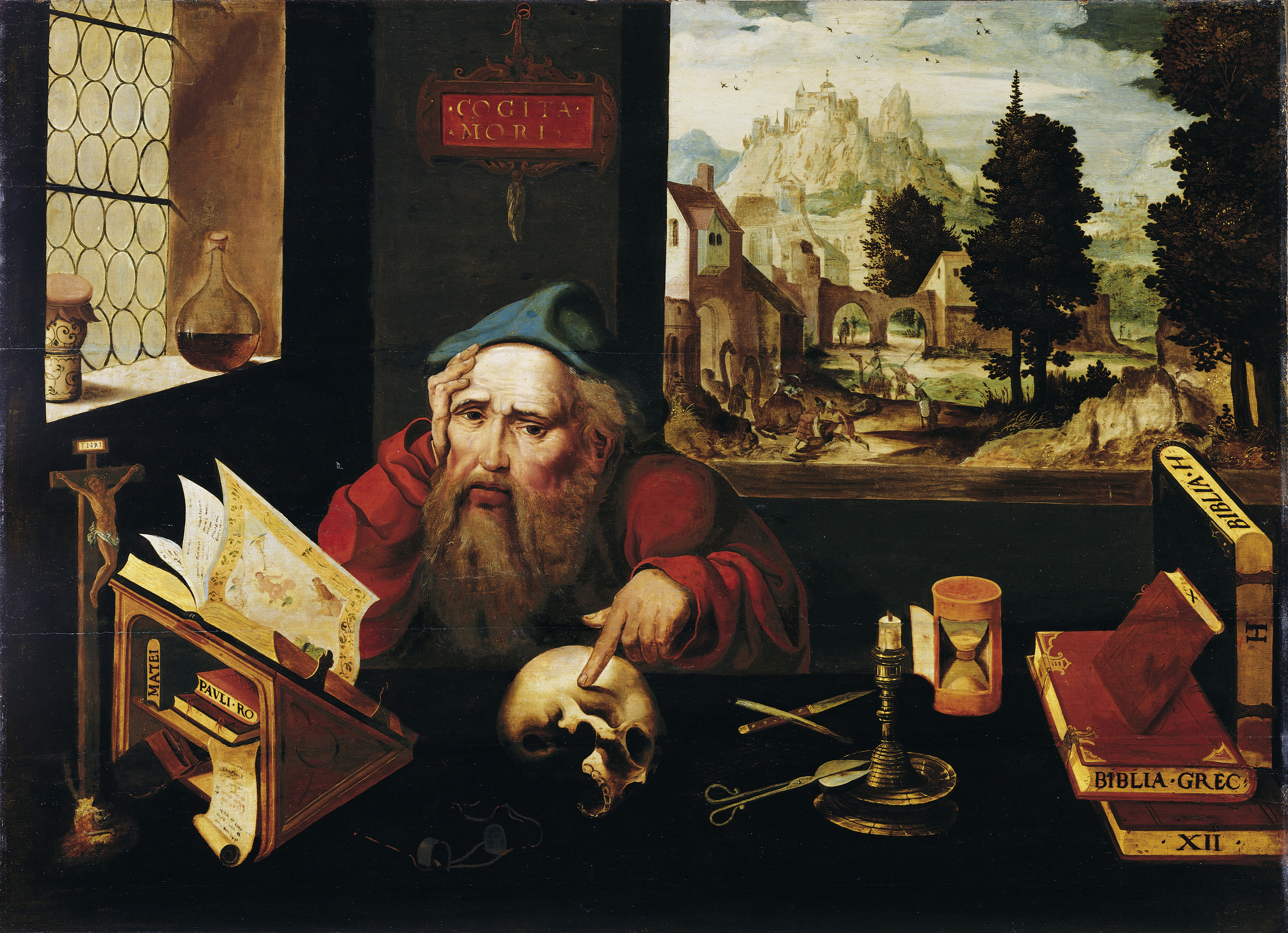
Horizontally extended second type, by a follower of Joos

Saint Jerome became increasingly of interest and popular after the publication of Erasmus's nine-volume set of his works, prefaced with a biography, in 1516, and the general increased interest in the text of the Bible. Jerome had compiled the Latin Vulgate which remained the official version of the Western church until the Protestant Reformation was well under way.

Paintings of Saint Jerome were produced by Joos and his workshop, apparently beginning in 1521, in three basic types: penitent amid a desert landscape, with his attribute of a lion; at bust or half-length in a cluttered study, often with a skull on his desk; and lastly in his study, naked to the waist and holding a rock. The first two are not original, and borrow in particular from Albrecht Dürer; the last, from the 1520s onwards, is an unusual combination of a figure type usually seen outdoors with the indoors study setting. In some versions of this type there are inscriptions referring to the Last Judgement. Various inscriptions in the second type, usually on the back wall, also exhort thoughts of death and judgement. The last type is probably known only from numerous workshop or later versions.

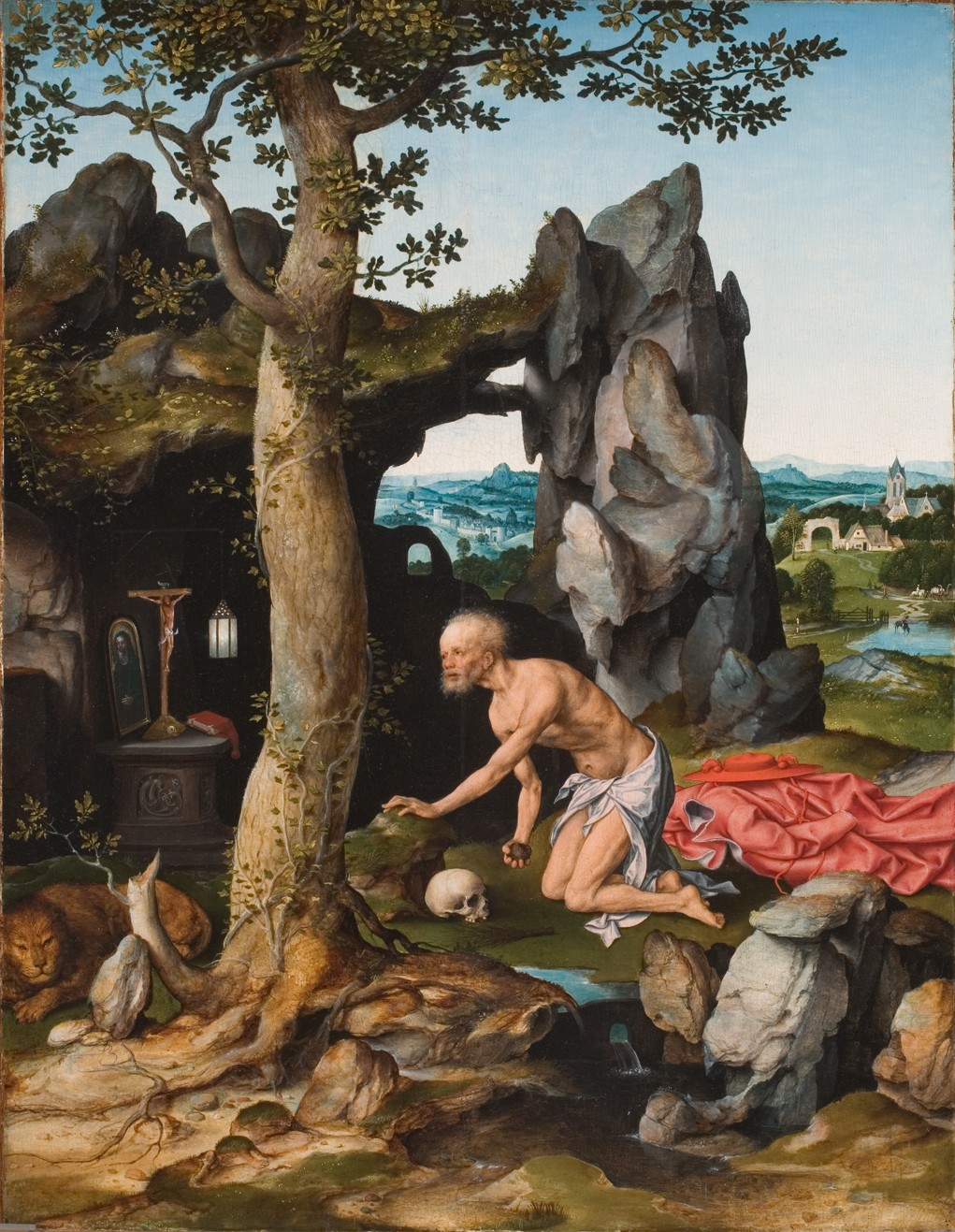
Saint Jerome in Penitence, Muskegon Museum of Art

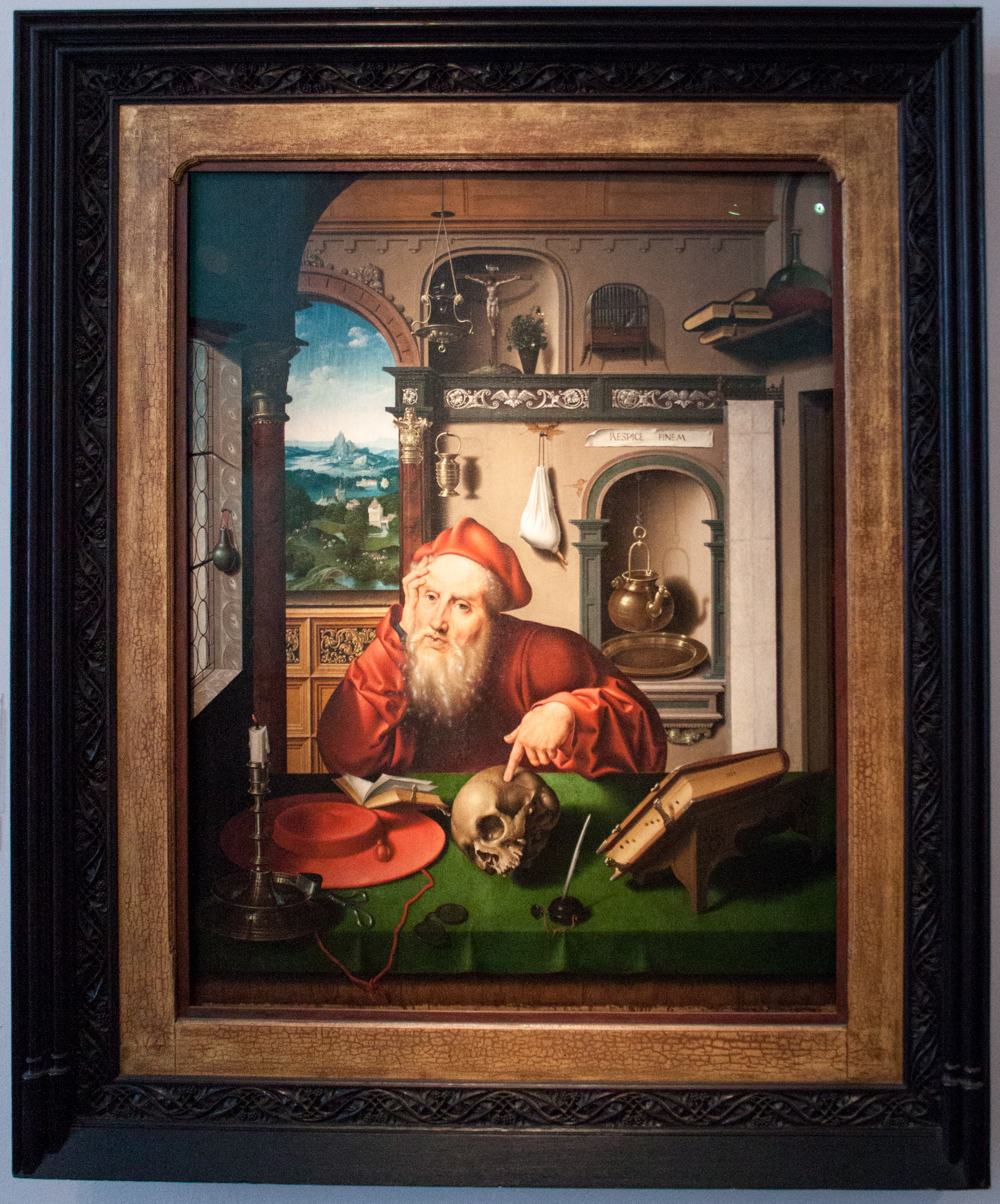
The second type described here

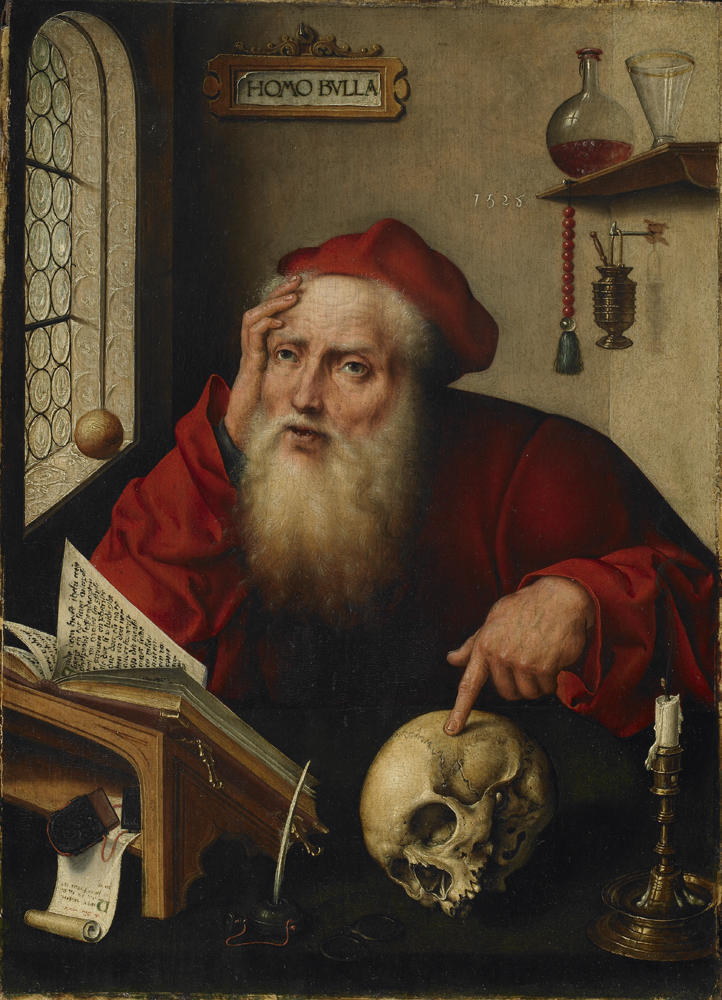
Saint Jerome in His Study, 1528, Princeton, with HOMO BULLA ("Man is a bubble") on the wall.

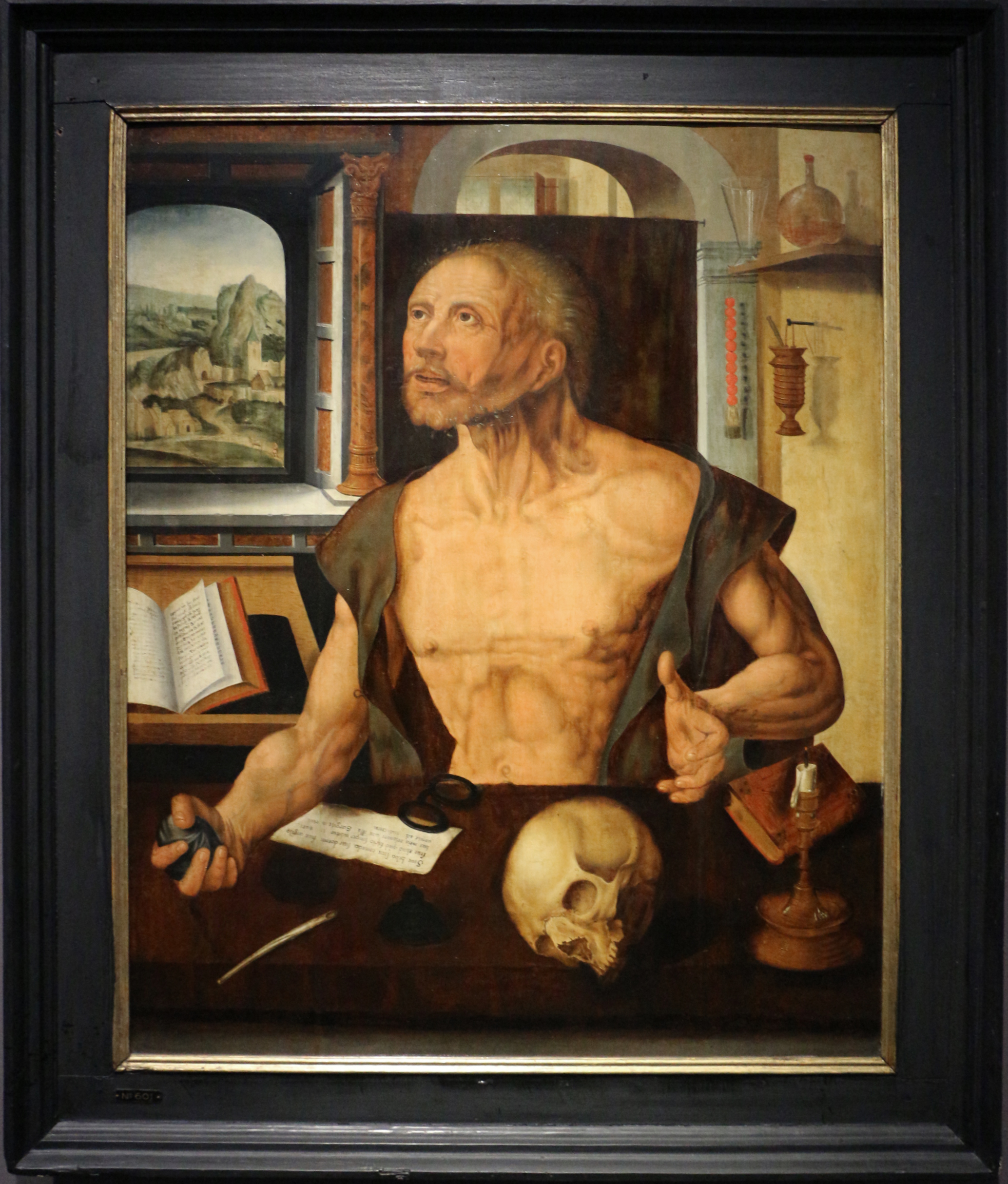
In his study, with a rock

== Works (very incomplete list) ==
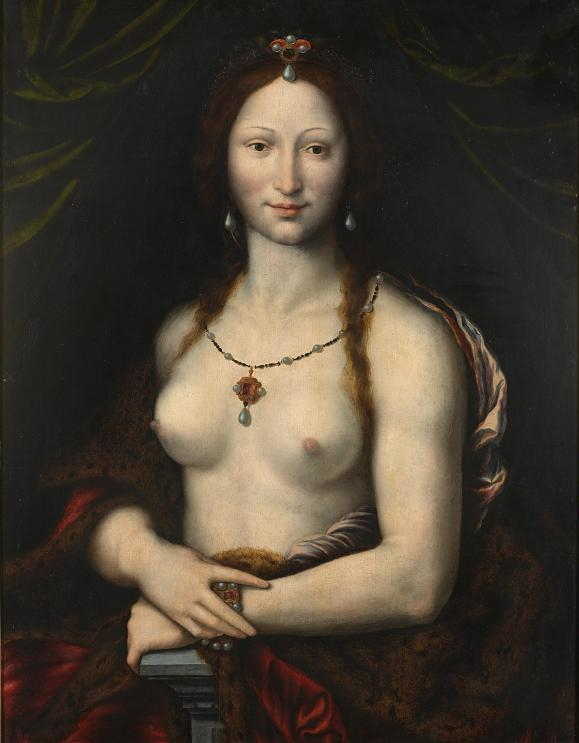
Mona Vanna

=== In chronological order ===
- The Holy Family (1515), Academy of Fine Arts Vienna
- Saint Reinhold Altar (before 1516), National Museum, Warsaw
- Descent from the Cross (c. 1517–20), Philadelphia Museum of Art
- Triptych. Centre: the Deposition from the Cross; Left wing: St John the Baptist with a Donor; Right wing: St Margaret of Antioch with a Donatrix (1518–1519), National Gallery of Scotland, Edinburgh
- Self-Portrait (1519), Thyssen-Bornemisza Museum, Madrid
- The Death of the Virgin (1520), Alte Pinakothek, Munich
- Man with the Rosary (1520), National Museum of Serbia
- Altarpiece of the Lamentation (1520–25), Louvre, Paris
- Lucretia (1520–25), Kunsthistorisches Museum, Vienna
- Madonna of the Cherries (c1525), Bristol Museum & Art Gallery, Bristol, UK.
- St. John the Evangelist on Patmos (1525), University of Michigan Museum of Art, Ann Arbor
- Portrait of a Man and Woman (1520 and 1527), Galleria degli Uffizi, Florence
- The Annunciation (1525), Metropolitan Museum of Art, New York
- The Infants Christ and Saint John the Baptist Embracing (1525–30), Art Institute of Chicago, Chicago
- Adoration of the Magi (1526–28), Gemäldegalerie Alte Meister, Dresden
- Saint Jerome in his Study (1528), Frances Lehman Loeb Art Center, Vassar College, Poughkeepsie, New York
- Portrait of Eleonora, Queen of France (1530), Kunsthistorisches Museum, Vienna
- Virgin and Child (1535), Landesmuseum, Oldenburg
- Madonna and Child against the renaissance background (c. 1535), Museum of King Jan III's Palace at Wilanów, Warsaw
- Madonna and Child with Carnation (c. 1535), Nelson-Atkins Museum of Art, Kansas City, MO

=== Dates unknown ===
- Death of the Virgin, Wallraf-Richartz Museum, Cologne
- The Holy Family, Hermitage Museum, St. Petersburg
- Mona Vanna, National Gallery Prague
- Portrait of Agniete ven den Rijne, Rijksmuseum Twenthe, Enschede
- Portrait of Anthonis van Hilten, Rijksmuseum Twenthe, Enschede
- St. Anne with the Virgin and Child and St. Joachim, Oldmasters Museum, Brussels
- Virgin and Child, Museum of Fine Arts, Budapest
- Triptych of Saint Peter, Saint Paul and Saint Andrew, Sacred Art Museum of Funchal
