= Jost =

Jost is both a German given name and surname and also a Jewish (Ashkenazi) surname.

Notable people with the name include:

== Given name ==
- Jost Amman (1539–1591), Swiss artist
- Jost Bürgi (1552–1632), Swiss clockmaker, maker of astronomical instruments, and mathematician
- Jost Metzler (1909–1975), German submarine commander during World War II
- Jost Vacano (born 1934), German cinematographer
- Jost Capito (born 1958), German motorsport manager

== Surname ==
- Alfred Jost (1916–1991), French endocrinologist
- Christian Jost (born 1963), German composer
- Christian Jost, French geographer
- Colin Jost (born 1982), American writer and comedian
- Heinz Jost (1904–1964), Nazi S.S. war criminal
- Henry L. Jost (1873–1950), American politician
- Isaak Markus Jost (1793–1860) Jewish historical writer
- Jeffrey Jost, American bobsledder
- John Jost (born 1968), American social psychologist
- Jon Jost (born 1943), American independent filmmaker
- Jürgen Jost, German mathematician
- Matthieu Jost (figure skater) (born 1981), French ice dancer
- Mike Jost (born 1979), American musician
- Peter Jost (1921–2016), German-British mechanical engineer, founder of tribology
- Reinhold Jost (born 1966), German politician
- Res Jost (1918–1990), Swiss physicist
- Tyson Jost (born 1998), Canadian hockey player

== See also ==
- Jost Van Dyke, an island in the British Virgin Islands
- Joest, a surname
