= Mézery =

Mézery may refer to:

- Mézery, a neighbourhood in the municipality of Jouxtens-Mézery in the canton of Vaud, Switzerland
- Mézery-près-Donneloye, a former municipality in the canton of Vaud, Switzerland
