= David-Philippe de Treytorrens =

Swiss officer in French service and merchant (1721–1788)

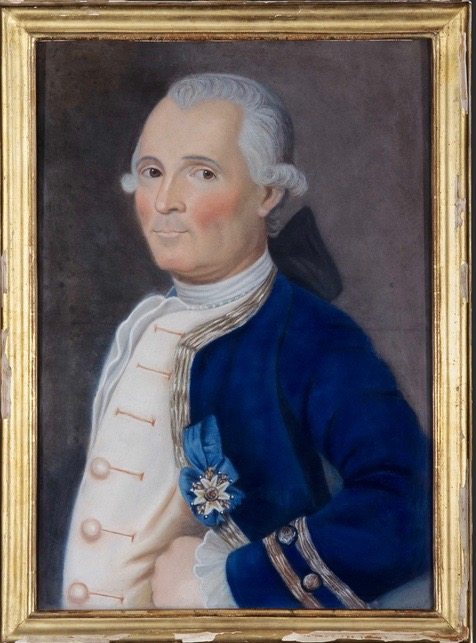
Portrait of David-Philippe de Treytorrens with the Ordre du Mérite militaire, awarded by Louis XV in 1771; painted by Jean-Étienne Liotard

David-Philippe de Treytorrens (April 1, 1721 – August 24, 1788) was a Swiss officer in foreign service and merchant. His life and work reflect the complex interplay of military service, colonialism, and private life in the 18th century.

== Life ==
=== Family ===
David-Philippe de Treytorrens was a member of the Treytorrens family. He was the ninth of twelve children born to Jean-Rodolphe de Treytorrens (January 29, 1686 – August 23, 1739), an officer in Dutch service, later a deputy bailiff of Yverdon-les-Bains, and his wife Henriette, daughter of Henri Jaccard, a captain in French service. Among his siblings was his younger brother Henri-François de Treytorrens, and he was a cousin of Frederick Haldimand, later Governor of Quebec, who died in 1791 at the Villa d’Entremont.

On May 9, 1766, in Port-au-Prince, David-Philippe married Marie, a Creole and daughter of plantation owner Gilles Letort (1693–1760) from Brittany and his wife Marie (née Rémy) (died 1770), who owned large sugar plantations in Saint-Domingue. The couple had no children.

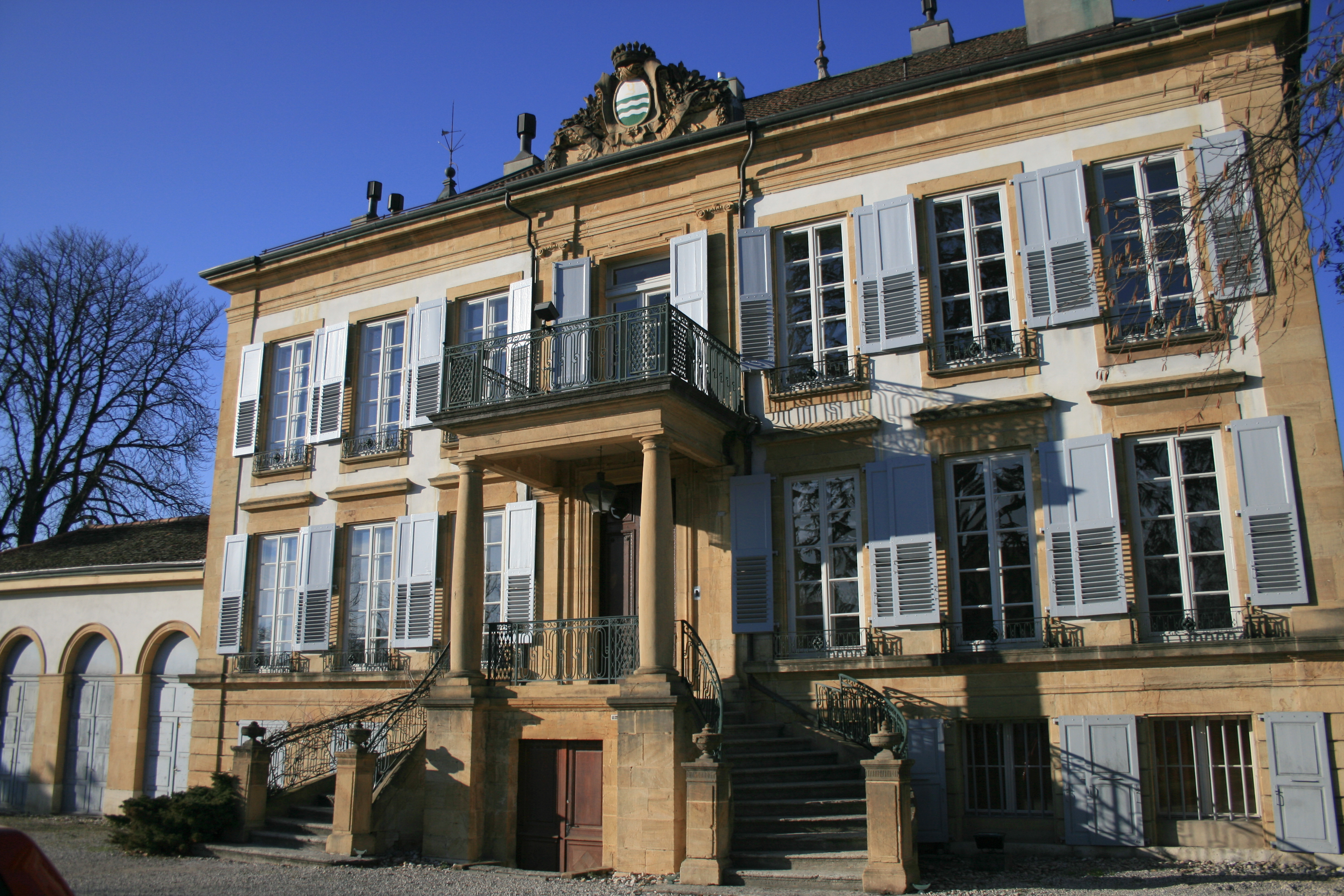
Villa d’Entremont

In 1771 or 1776, they returned to Yverdon and, from 1778, built a country house called Bains neufs, later known as Villa d’Entremont. They brought two enslaved individuals from Saint-Domingue: François Mida (died 1797 in Yverdon) and Pauline Buisson (1770 – February 10, 1826). Pauline gave birth to an illegitimate son, Samuel Hippolyte Buisson, in 1790, reportedly fathered by a French servant named Le Bel. Samuel later worked as a shoemaker in Yverdon. Although slavery was prohibited in the Old Swiss Confederacy, Pauline Buisson was not legally granted a surname. Her son Samuel was denied citizenship and local rights, despite legal disputes between the Treytorrens family and the Yverdon municipality, which feared having to support him financially. The dispute ended with a settlement in 1834, but Samuel died stateless in 1832.

The Villa d’Entremont in Yverdon-les-Bains, built between 1778 and 1785 for David-Philippe de Treytorrens, is a country house with two richly decorated facades. It was designed by architect Béat de Hennezel (1733–1810) on the site of a former Treytorrens family estate near the Yverdon baths. The Treytorrens coat of arms, once displayed at the roofline with floral decoration, has been replaced by the city's coat of arms, as Yverdon has owned the property since 1961.

=== Career ===
David-Philippe de Treytorrens spent his youth in Yverdon, growing up in a military-oriented environment.

He served in the French military and was sent to Saint-Domingue in 1742. There, he rose to captain in 1747 and later to major general with the rank of lieutenant colonel in the French East India Company. The company maintained a force of 8,000 soldiers on the island, including a Swiss company; between 1715 and 1744, 957 Swiss soldiers were recruited. During the Seven Years' War, he participated in the defense of Saint-Domingue against the British and helped suppress slave revolts, notably the uprising led by François Mackandal between 1753 and 1757.

As a merchant, David-Philippe was involved in the slave trade, using the profits to fund the construction of his villa.

== Honors and awards ==
In 1771, David-Philippe de Treytorrens was appointed a knight of the Institution du Mérite militaire (see Order of Military Merit (France)) by King Louis XV.

== Bibliography ==
- Olivier Pavillon, Rafael Wagner: David-Philippe de Treytorrens. In: Historical Dictionary of Switzerland.
