= Champtauroz =

- Municipality
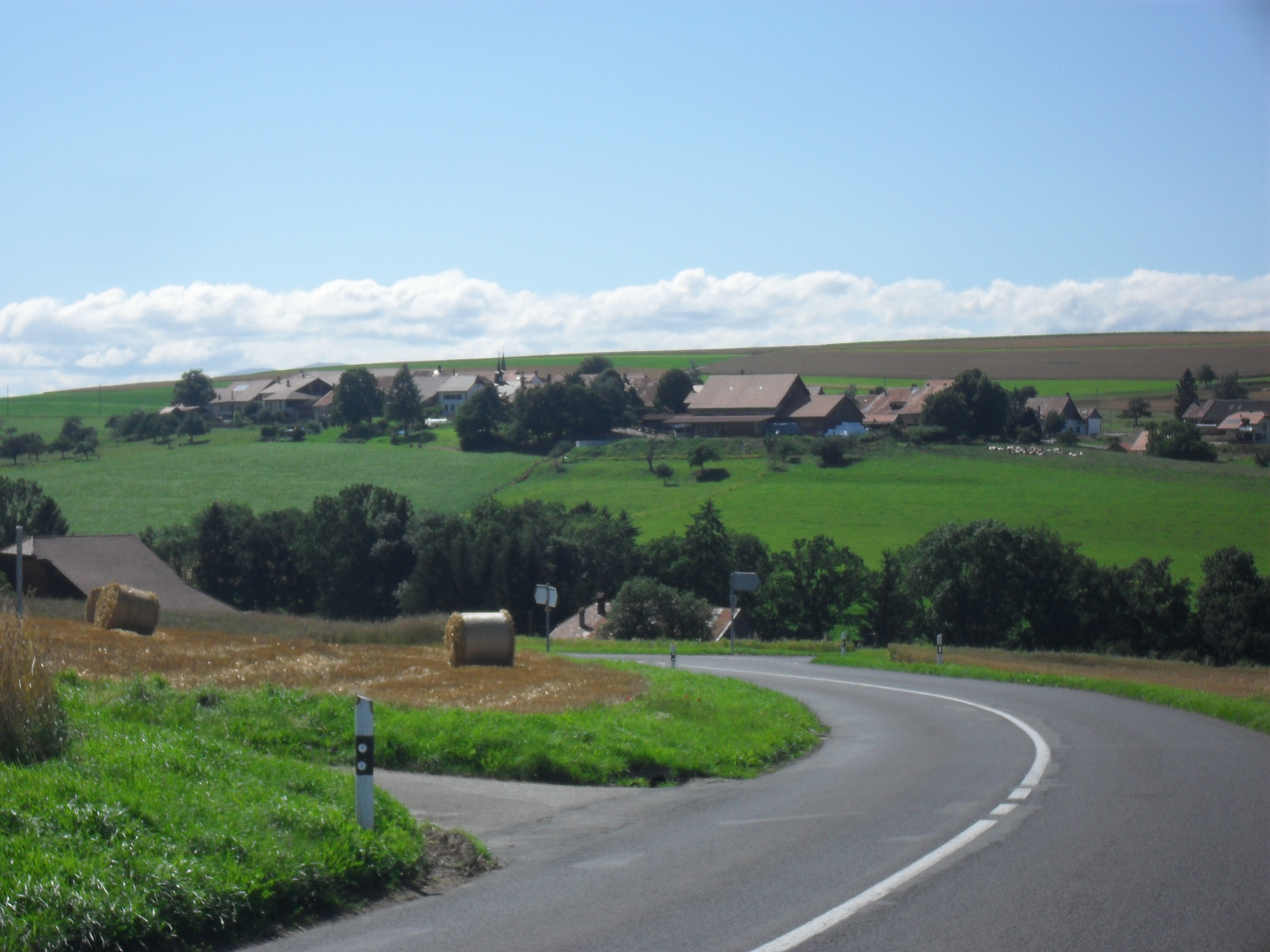

- Flag Coat of arms
- Location of Champtauroz
- Location within Switzerland Location within Canton of Vaud
- Coordinates: 46°46′N 6°47′E
- Country: Switzerland
- Canton: Vaud
- District: Broye-Vully

Government
  - Mayor: Syndic

Area
  - Total: 3.05 km^{2} (1.18 sq mi)
- Elevation: 692 m (2,270 ft)

Population (2003)
  - Total: 116
  - Density: 38.0/km^{2} (98.5/sq mi)
- Time zone: UTC+01:00 (CET)
  - Summer (DST): UTC+02:00 (CEST)
- Postal code: 1537
- SFOS number: 5812
- ISO 3166 code: CH-VD
- Surrounded by: Chavannes-le-Chêne, Chêne-Pâquier, Combremont-le-Grand, Combremont-le-Petit, Démoret, Treytorrens (Payerne), Vuissens (FR)
- Website: https://www.champtauroz.ch/

Champtauroz is a municipality in the district of Broye-Vully in the canton of Vaud in Switzerland.

== History ==
Champtauroz is first mentioned in 1228 as Chantuoro.

== Geography ==
Champtauroz has an area, as of 2009, of 3.05 square kilometers (1.18 sq mi). Of this area, 2.28 km^{2} (0.88 sq mi) or 74.8% is used for agricultural purposes, while 0.59 km^{2} (0.23 sq mi) or 19.3% is forested. Of the rest of the land, 0.15 km^{2} (37 acres) or 4.9% is settled (buildings or roads), 0.01 km^{2} (2.5 acres) or 0.3% is either rivers or lakes. Of the built up area, housing and buildings made up 2.0% and transportation infrastructure made up 2.3%. Out of the forested land, all of the forested land area is covered with heavy forests. Of the agricultural land, 62.3% is used for growing crops and 11.8% is pastures. All the water in the municipality is in lakes.

The municipality was part of the Payerne District until it was dissolved on 31 August 2006, and Champtauroz became part of the new district of Broye-Vully.

The municipality is located along the Lucens-Yvonand street. It consists of the village of Champtauroz and the hamlet of Le Pontet.

== Coat of arms ==
The blazon of the municipal coat of arms is Per fess Gules a Castle Argent, and Plain Argent.

== Demographics ==
Champtauroz has a population (as of December 2020) of 144. As of 2008, 6.7% of the population are resident foreign nationals. Over the last 10 years (1999–2009 ) the population has changed at a rate of 9.3%. It has changed at a rate of 4.6% due to migration and at a rate of 4.6% due to births and deaths.

Most of the population (as of 2000) speaks French (95 or 95.0%), with German being second most common (3 or 3.0%) and English being third (1 or 1.0%).

Of the population in the municipality 37 or about 37.0% were born in Champtauroz and lived there in 2000. There were 32 or 32.0% who were born in the same canton, while 23 or 23.0% were born somewhere else in Switzerland, and 8 or 8.0% were born outside of Switzerland.

In 2008, ignoring immigration and emigration, the population of Swiss citizens remained the same and the foreign population remained the same. There was 1 non-Swiss man and 1 non-Swiss woman who immigrated from another country to Switzerland. The total Swiss population remained the same in 2008 and the non-Swiss population increased by 2 people. This represents a population growth rate of 1.7%.

The age distribution, as of 2009, in Champtauroz is; 20 children or 16.9% of the population are between 0 and 9 years old and 12 teenagers or 10.2% are between 10 and 19. Of the adult population, 8 people or 6.8% of the population are between 20 and 29 years old. 13 people or 11.0% are between 30 and 39, 18 people or 15.3% are between 40 and 49, and 15 people or 12.7% are between 50 and 59. The senior population distribution is 15 people or 12.7% of the population are between 60 and 69 years old, 8 people or 6.8% are between 70 and 79, there are 9 people or 7.6% who are between 80 and 89.

As of 2000, there were 38 people who were single and never married in the municipality. There were 53 married individuals, 7 widows or widowers and 2 individuals who are divorced.

As of 2000, there were 43 private households in the municipality, and an average of 2.3 persons per household. There were 12 households that consist of only one person and 2 households with five or more people. Out of a total of 43 households that answered this question, 27.9% were households made up of just one person and there was 1 adult who lived with their parents. Of the rest of the households, there are 14 married couples without children, 13 married couples with children There were 3 single parents with a child or children.

In 2000 there were 17 single family homes (or 44.7% of the total) out of a total of 38 inhabited buildings. There were 8 multi-family buildings (21.1%), along with 12 multi-purpose buildings that were mostly used for housing (31.6%) and 1 other use buildings (commercial or industrial) that also had some housing (2.6%). Of the single family homes 14 were built before 1919, while none were built between 1990 and 2000. The most multi-family homes (6) were built before 1919 and the next most (1) were built between 1946 and 1960.

In 2000 there were 51 apartments in the municipality. The most common apartment size was 3 rooms of which there were 14. There were 2 single room apartments and 22 apartments with five or more rooms. Of these apartments, a total of 43 apartments (84.3% of the total) were permanently occupied, while 4 apartments (7.8%) were seasonally occupied and 4 apartments (7.8%) were empty. As of 2009, the construction rate of new housing units was 0 new units per 1000 residents. The vacancy rate for the municipality, in 2010, was 0%.

The historical population is given in the following chart:

== Politics ==
In the 2007 federal election the SVP received 30.48% of the vote. Most of the rest of the votes went to the SP with 29.73% of the vote. In the federal election, a total of 38 votes were cast, and the voter turnout was 46.3%.

== Economy ==
As of 2010, Champtauroz had an unemployment rate of 0.7%. As of 2008, there were 25 people employed in the primary economic sector and about 8 businesses involved in this sector. 14 people were employed in the secondary sector and there was 1 business in this sector. 1 person was employed in the tertiary sector, with 1 business in this sector. There were 48 residents of the municipality who were employed in some capacity, of which females made up 41.7% of the workforce.

In 2008 the total number of full-time equivalent jobs was 28. The number of jobs in the primary sector was 15, all of which were in agriculture. The number of jobs in the secondary sector was 12, all of which were in manufacturing. The number of jobs in the tertiary sector was 1, in education.

In 2000, there were 16 workers who commuted into the municipality and 27 workers who commuted away. The municipality is a net exporter of workers, with about 1.7 workers leaving the municipality for every one entering. Of the working population, 6.3% used public transportation to get to work, and 50% used a private car.

== Religion ==
From the 2000 census, 14 or 14.0% were Roman Catholic, while 73 or 73.0% belonged to the Swiss Reformed Church. Of the rest of the population, and there were 3 individuals (or about 3.00% of the population) who belonged to another Christian church. There was 1 individual who was Islamic. 9 (or about 9.00% of the population) belonged to no church, are agnostic or atheist.

== Education ==
In Champtauroz about 37 or (37.0%) of the population have completed non-mandatory upper secondary education, and 17 or (17.0%) have completed additional higher education (either university or a Fachhochschule). Of the 17 who completed tertiary schooling, 58.8% were Swiss men, 35.3% were Swiss women.

In the 2009/2010 school year there were a total of 23 students in the Champtauroz school district. In the Vaud cantonal school system, two years of non-obligatory pre-school are provided by the political districts. During the school year, the political district provided pre-school care for a total of 155 children of which 83 children (53.5%) received subsidized pre-school care. The canton's primary school program requires students to attend for four years. There were 19 students in the municipal primary school program. The obligatory lower secondary school program lasts for six years and there were 4 students in those schools.

As of 2000, there were 10 students in Champtauroz who came from another municipality, while 16 residents attended schools outside the municipality.
