= Chavannes-le-Chêne =

- Municipality
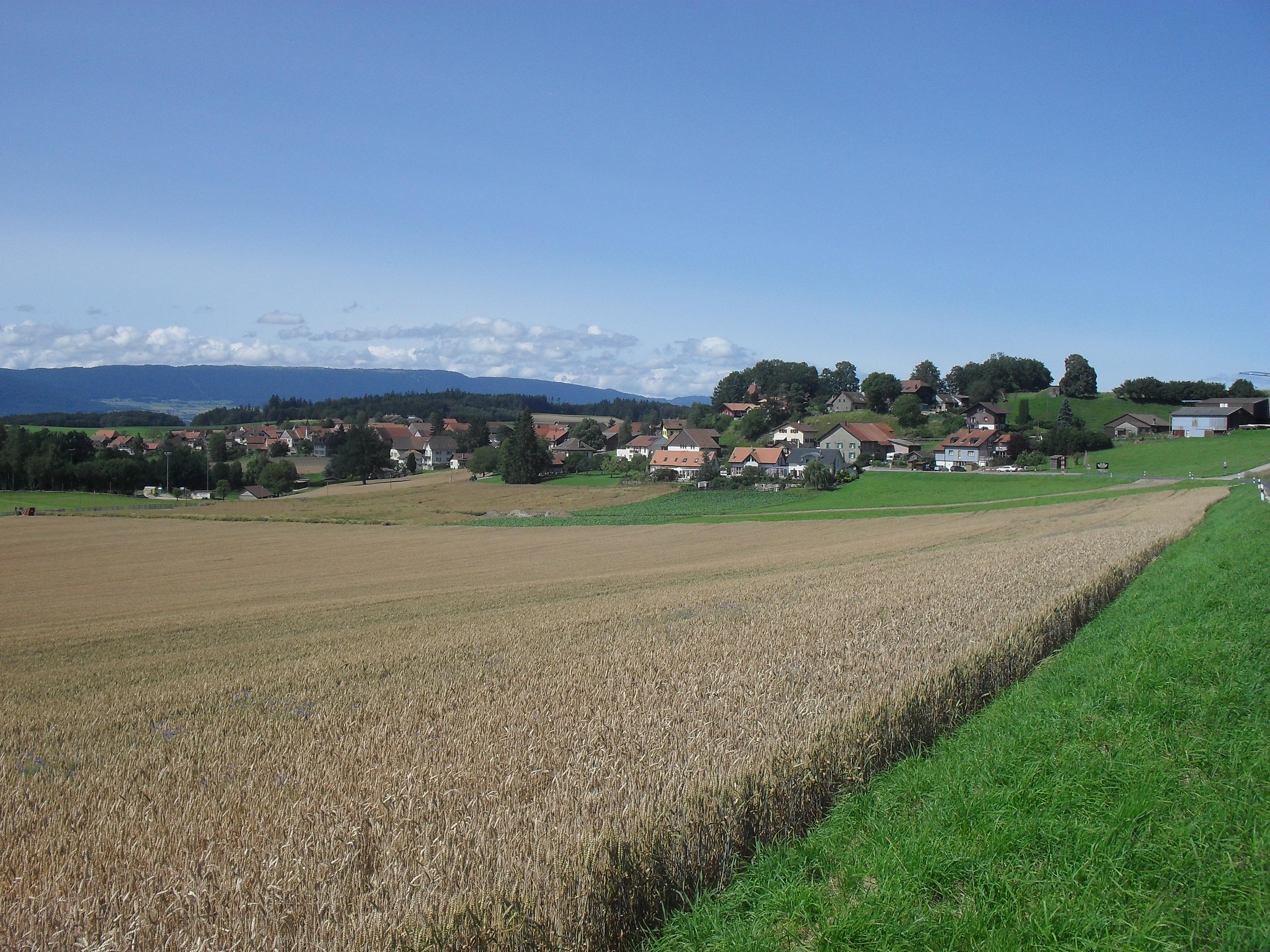

- Flag Coat of arms
- Location of Chavannes-le-Chêne
- Location within Switzerland Location within Canton of Vaud
- Coordinates: 46°47′N 6°47′E
- Country: Switzerland
- Canton: Vaud
- District: Jura-Nord Vaudois

Government
  - Mayor: Syndic

Area
  - Total: 3.98 km^{2} (1.54 sq mi)
- Elevation: 660 m (2,170 ft)

Population (2003)
  - Total: 236
  - Density: 59.3/km^{2} (154/sq mi)
- Time zone: UTC+01:00 (CET)
  - Summer (DST): UTC+02:00 (CEST)
- Postal code: 1464
- SFOS number: 5907
- ISO 3166 code: CH-VD
- Surrounded by: Champtauroz, Chêne-Pâquier, Cheyres (FR), Molondin, Murist (FR), Rovray, Treytorrens (Payerne)
- Website: http://www.chavannes-le-chene.ch/ Profile (in French), SFSO statistics

Chavannes-le-Chêne is a municipality in the district of Jura-Nord Vaudois of the canton of Vaud in Switzerland.

== History ==
Chavannes-le-Chêne is first mentioned in 1334 as Chavanes.

== Geography ==
Chavannes-le-Chêne has an area, as of 2009, of 4 square kilometers (1.5 mi^{2}). Of this area, 3.3 km^{2} (1.3 mi^{2}) or 82.9% is used for agricultural purposes, while 0.45 km^{2} (0.17 mi^{2}) or 11.3% is forested. Of the rest of the land, 0.23 km^{2} (0.089 mi^{2}) or 5.8% is settled (buildings or roads), 0.01 km^{2} (2.5 acres) or 0.3% is either rivers or lakes and 0.01 km^{2} (2.5 acres) or 0.3% is unproductive land.

Of the built up area, housing and buildings made up 3.3% and transportation infrastructure made up 2.0%. Out of the forested land, all of the forested land area is covered with heavy forests. Of the agricultural land, 73.1% is used for growing crops and 8.8% is pastures. All the water in the municipality is in lakes.

The municipality was part of the Yverdon District until it was dissolved on 31 August 2006, and Chavannes-le-Chêne became part of the new district of Jura-Nord Vaudois.

It consists of the village of Chavannes-le-Chêne and the hamlet of La Ruchille.

== Coat of arms ==
The blazon of the municipal coat of arms is Vert, three Acorns two and one Argent.

== Demographics ==
Chavannes-le-Chêne has a population (as of December 2020) of 324. As of 2008, 10.2% of the population are resident foreign nationals. Over the last 10 years (1999–2009 ) the population has changed at a rate of 15%. It has changed at a rate of 14.2% due to migration and at a rate of 0% due to births and deaths.

Most of the population (as of 2000) speaks French (210 or 90.1%) as their first language, with German being second most common (12 or 5.2%) and Portuguese being third (5 or 2.1%). There is 1 person who speaks Italian.

The age distribution, as of 2009, in Chavannes-le-Chêne is; 31 children or 11.9% of the population are between 0 and 9 years old and 31 teenagers or 11.9% are between 10 and 19. Of the adult population, 36 people or 13.8% of the population are between 20 and 29 years old. 42 people or 16.2% are between 30 and 39, 31 people or 11.9% are between 40 and 49, and 34 people or 13.1% are between 50 and 59. The senior population distribution is 30 people or 11.5% of the population are between 60 and 69 years old, 15 people or 5.8% are between 70 and 79, there are 10 people or 3.8% who are between 80 and 89.

As of 2000, there were 98 people who were single and never married in the municipality. There were 97 married individuals, 24 widows or widowers and 14 individuals who are divorced.

As of 2000, there were 98 private households in the municipality, and an average of 2.3 persons per household. There were 35 households that consist of only one person and 4 households with five or more people. Out of a total of 99 households that answered this question, 35.4% were households made up of just one person and there were 2 adults who lived with their parents. Of the rest of the households, there are 19 married couples without children, 31 married couples with children There were 9 single parents with a child or children. There were 2 households that were made up of unrelated people and 1 household that was made up of some sort of institution or another collective housing.

In 2000 there were 41 single family homes (or 53.9% of the total) out of a total of 76 inhabited buildings. There were 13 multi-family buildings (17.1%), along with 17 multi-purpose buildings that were mostly used for housing (22.4%) and 5 other use buildings (commercial or industrial) that also had some housing (6.6%).

In 2000, a total of 94 apartments (90.4% of the total) were permanently occupied, while 2 apartments (1.9%) were seasonally occupied and 8 apartments (7.7%) were empty. As of 2009, the construction rate of new housing units was 0 new units per 1000 residents. The vacancy rate for the municipality, in 2010, was 0%.

The historical population is given in the following chart:

== Heritage sites of national significance ==
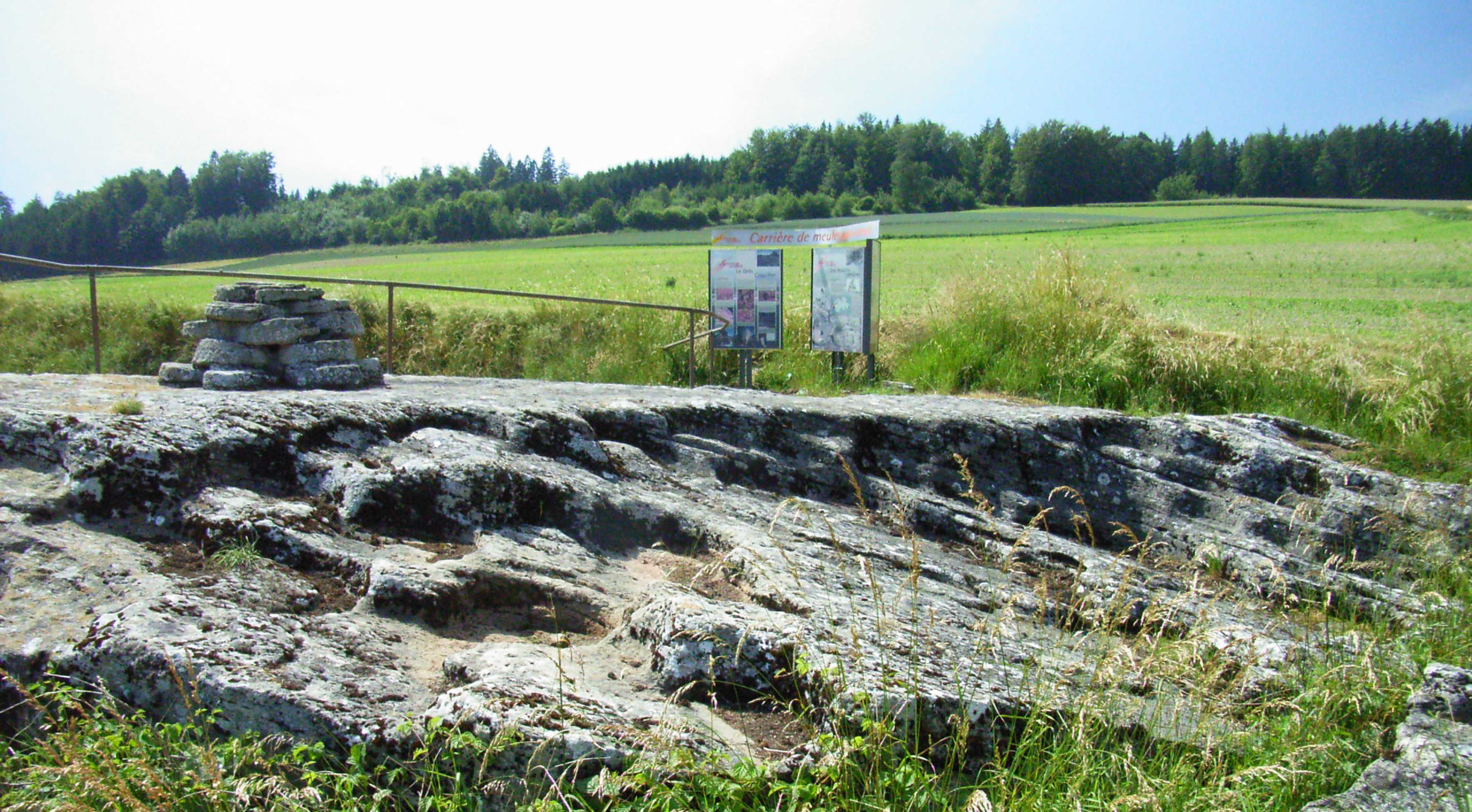
Gallo-Roman quarry near Chavannes-le-Chêne

The Vallon Des Vaux, a prehistoric and High Middle Ages settlement is listed as a Swiss heritage site of national significance.

== Politics ==
In the 2007 federal election the most popular party was the SVP which received 40.9% of the vote. The next three most popular parties were the FDP (21.21%), the Green Party (13.99%) and the LPS Party (8.18%). In the federal election, a total of 57 votes were cast, and the voter turnout was 33.1%.

== Economy ==
As of 2010, Chavannes-le-Chêne had an unemployment rate of 3.5%. As of 2008, there were 22 people employed in the primary economic sector and about 11 businesses involved in this sector. 13 people were employed in the secondary sector and there were 4 businesses in this sector. 16 people were employed in the tertiary sector, with 7 businesses in this sector. There were 122 residents of the municipality who were employed in some capacity, of which females made up 40.2% of the workforce.

In 2008 the total number of full-time equivalent jobs was 34. The number of jobs in the primary sector was 14, all of which were in agriculture. The number of jobs in the secondary sector was 10, all of which were in construction. The number of jobs in the tertiary sector was 10. In the tertiary sector; 3 or 30.0% were in wholesale or retail sales or the repair of motor vehicles, 2 or 20.0% were in the movement and storage of goods, 1 was in a hotel or restaurant, 1 was in education.

In 2000, there were 11 workers who commuted into the municipality and 82 workers who commuted away. The municipality is a net exporter of workers, with about 7.5 workers leaving the municipality for every one entering. Of the working population, 8.2% used public transportation to get to work, and 58.2% used a private car.

== Religion ==
From the 2000 census, 28 or 12.0% were Roman Catholic, while 161 or 69.1% belonged to the Swiss Reformed Church. Of the rest of the population, there were 3 individuals (or about 1.29% of the population) who belonged to another Christian church. 38 (or about 16.31% of the population) belonged to no church, are agnostic or atheist, and 4 individuals (or about 1.72% of the population) did not answer the question.

== Education ==
In Chavannes-le-Chêne about 97 or (41.6%) of the population have completed non-mandatory upper secondary education, and 30 or (12.9%) have completed additional higher education (either university or a Fachhochschule). Of the 30 who completed tertiary schooling, 53.3% were Swiss men, 26.7% were Swiss women.

In the 2009/2010 school year there were a total of 39 students in the Chavannes-le-Chêne school district. In the Vaud cantonal school system, two years of non-obligatory pre-school are provided by the political districts. During the school year, the political district provided pre-school care for a total of 578 children of which 359 children (62.1%) received subsidized pre-school care. The canton's primary school program requires students to attend for four years. There were 18 students in the municipal primary school program. The obligatory lower secondary school program lasts for six years and there were 21 students in those schools.

As of 2000, there were 7 students in Chavannes-le-Chêne who came from another municipality, while 24 residents attended schools outside the municipality.

== Climate ==
Climate in this area has mild differences between highs and lows, and there is adequate rainfall year-round. The Köppen Climate Classification subtype for this climate is "Cfb". (Marine West Coast Climate/Oceanic climate).

Climate data for Chavannes-le-Chêne (1981-2010)
Month	Jan	Feb	Mar	Apr	May	Jun	Jul	Aug	Sep	Oct	Nov	Dec	Year
Mean daily maximum °C (°F)	3.0 (37.4)	4.9 (40.8)	10.1 (50.2)	14.1 (57.4)	18.8 (65.8)	22.3 (72.1)	25.2 (77.4)	24.5 (76.1)	19.7 (67.5)	14.1 (57.4)	7.3 (45.1)	3.8 (38.8)	14.0 (57.2)
Daily mean °C (°F)	0.3 (32.5)	1.3 (34.3)	5.3 (41.5)	8.7 (47.7)	13.2 (55.8)	16.6 (61.9)	18.9 (66.0)	18.3 (64.9)	14.3 (57.7)	9.9 (49.8)	4.3 (39.7)	1.4 (34.5)	9.4 (48.9)
Mean daily minimum °C (°F)	−2.5 (27.5)	−2.2 (28.0)	0.8 (33.4)	3.4 (38.1)	7.8 (46.0)	11.0 (51.8)	12.9 (55.2)	12.7 (54.9)	9.5 (49.1)	6.1 (43.0)	1.3 (34.3)	−1.2 (29.8)	5.0 (41.0)
Average precipitation mm (inches)	53 (2.1)	47 (1.9)	60 (2.4)	68 (2.7)	90 (3.5)	90 (3.5)	88 (3.5)	95 (3.7)	84 (3.3)	86 (3.4)	64 (2.5)	66 (2.6)	891 (35.1)
Average snowfall cm (inches)	9.8 (3.9)	10.1 (4.0)	5.2 (2.0)	0.5 (0.2)	0 (0)	0 (0)	0 (0)	0 (0)	0 (0)	0 (0)	3.9 (1.5)	9.9 (3.9)	39.4 (15.5)
Average precipitation days (≥ 1.0 mm)	8.8	8.1	9.1	9.1	11.7	10.4	9.6	9.5	8.5	10.3	9.0	9.6	113.7
Average snowy days (≥ 1.0 cm)	3.1	2.8	1.6	0.2	0	0	0	0	0	0	1.1	2.5	11.3
Average relative humidity (%)	85	81	74	72	73	72	71	73	79	85	86	85	78
Mean monthly sunshine hours	54	84	143	169	192	221	248	227	169	107	61	44	1,719
Source: MeteoSwiss
