= Mézery-près-Donneloye =

- Former municipality
- Coat of arms
- Location of Mézery-près-Donneloye
- Location within Switzerland Location within Canton of Vaud
- Coordinates: 46°45′N 6°44′E
- Country: Switzerland
- Canton: Vaud
- District: Yverdon

Area
  - Total: 1.85 km^{2} (0.71 sq mi)
- Elevation: 625 m (2,051 ft)

Population (2003)
  - Total: 75
  - Density: 41/km^{2} (100/sq mi)
- Time zone: UTC+01:00 (CET)
  - Summer (DST): UTC+02:00 (CEST)
- Postal code: 1407
- SFOS number: 5920
- ISO 3166 code: CH-VD
- Surrounded by: Donneloye, Molondin, Prahins
- Website: Profile (in French), SFSO statistics

Mézery-près-Donneloye was a municipality in the district of Yverdon of the canton of Vaud in Switzerland. On January 1, 2008 it merged with Donneloye and Gossens to form Donneloye.
