= Donneloye Castle =

Manor house in Donneloye, Switzerland

Coordinates: 46.744864°N 6.716111°E

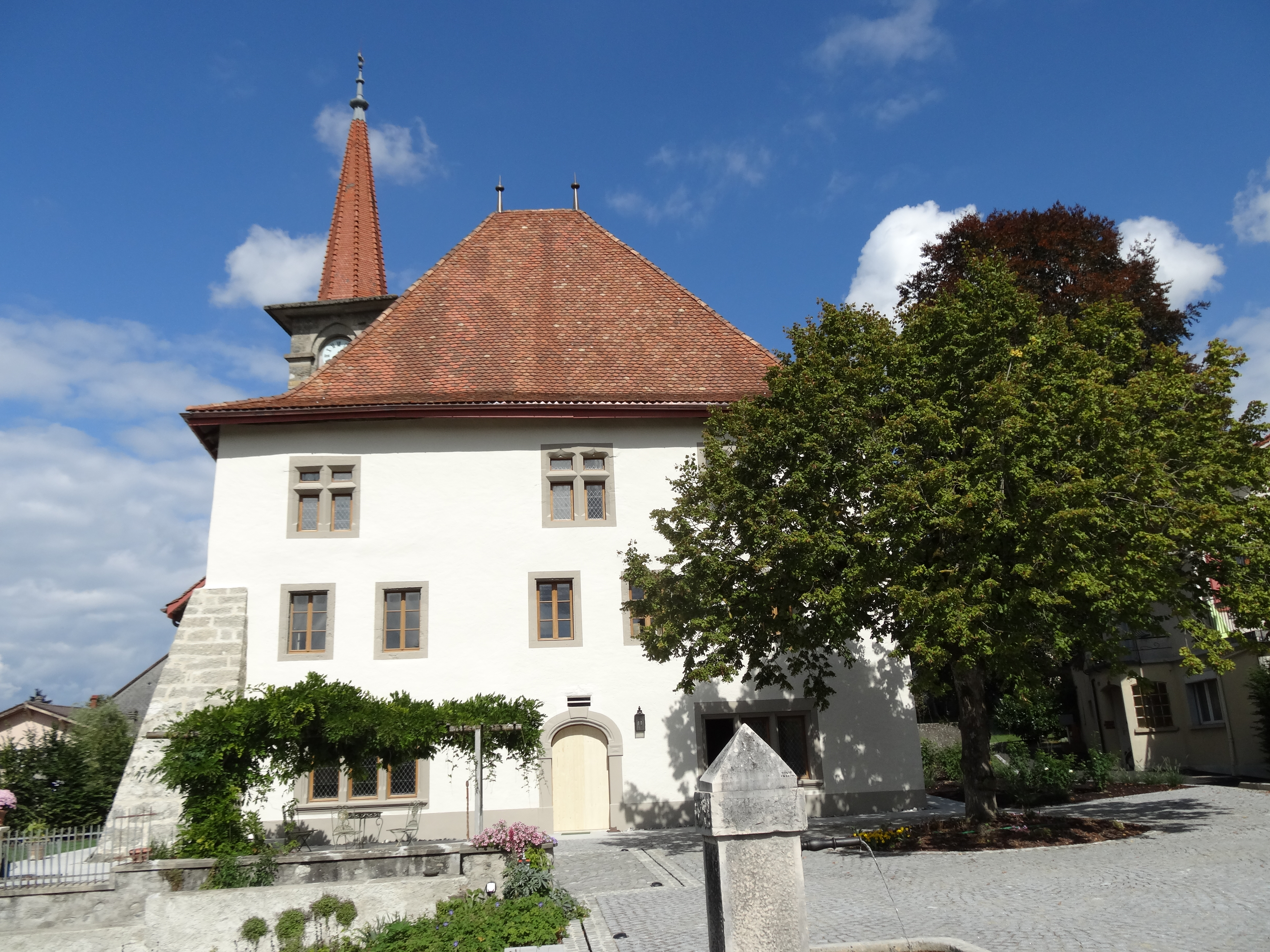
Donneloye Castle in 2013

Donneloye Castle (French: Château de Donneloye) is a manor house in the municipality of Donneloye of the Canton of Vaud in Switzerland. It is a Swiss heritage site of regional significance.

== History ==
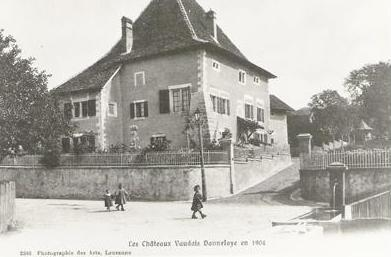
Donneloye Castle in 1904

Little is known of the history of the manor of Donneloye in the Middle Ages. The last scion of the autochthonous family, Othenin de Donneloye, died circa 1387 without male issue: it is not known if a castle then existed in the village, but it seems probable.

The manor passed to Edouard de Provana, of a northern Italian family, who in 1386 married Marguérite de Donneloye, daughter of Othenin, and in 1440 Jacques de Glâne, lord of Villardin and de la Molière, and his descendants possessed it until 1528, when Catherine de Glâne married Aubert Loys. The manor was then split, and the castle acquired by the family of Roguenet (or Regnault) de Romont, who apparently made important architectural alterations to the edifice.

Before 1600 Petterman d'Erlach (1579-1635), a Bernese catholic, inherited the castle by his marriage to Marguerite Roguenet, and on his death it passed to a distant relative, colonel Louis von Roll (1605-1652) of Soleure (Solothurn), who made further substantial alterations, evidenced by an inscription dated 1639 on the south façade. On Von Roll's death his widow, Claire de Vallier, sold the building to Jean-Philippe Loys (1622-1676). Loys, an influential landowner and politician in the region, reintegrated the manor, acquiring the rights and lands which had been detached since 1528. It was probably during the tenure of Loys that the windows on the first floor were enlarged, around 1660. In 1711 the Bernese, who had long wanted to acquire the manor because of its strategic position between Yverdon and Moudon, managed to persuade Loys' descendants to sell the rights, customs and usages, the family retaining the castle, the right to dispense justice to the inhabitants of Donneloye and other nearby villages, and to maintain a prison, no doubt the tower near the castle. The castle from then on seems to have been little used and fell into disrepair, the Loys family choosing to live on their estates in Moudon and Lausanne.

On the death of Jean Loys in 1739 the castle passed to his son Georges, lord of Orzens, who died without issue in 1753, and then to his brother Paul (died 1784), subsequently to Paul's son Etienne-Charles, the last lord of Villardin, who died without issue in 1800. Etienne-Charles' nieces, Duval de la Pottrie then acquired the castle, but soon sold it to Louis Durussel, a local landowner, whose family maintained it until 1889 when it was sold to Jacques-François Viquerat (1838-1904), conseiller d'état and mayor of Donneloye. One of Viquerat's charges was the preservation of historic monuments: instrumental in the restoration of the Château de Chillon and of Lausanne Cathedral, he also restored his residence at Donneloye in 1902. Several unfortunate additions and alterations of the 1950s have since been eliminated.

== Description ==
Built just south of the parish church, the castle was once surrounded by substantial lands and curtilages, all now lost, with the exception of the granary to the east, and the massive medieval tower to the south of the former courtyard, which was enclosed by a wall, now extant only along the road. The castle was erected in several stages: dendrochronological research dates one of the earlier beams to 1434/5, and by the 16th century it had taken on its current layout, including the imposing roof.

The building today consists of a principal rectangular body divided by a wide central corridor. There are three floors, the upper used as an attic since the raising of the ceilings, probably in the 17th century. There are no sculptures like those of the castle of Avenches, but it is a typical example of a rural medieval Savoyard manor house. The castle is currently (2020) in private hands.

== Sources ==
Luthi, Dave. Le Château de Donneloye: étude historique. Bureau de recherches en histoire de l'architecture, Lausanne 2002.

== See also ==
- List of castles in Switzerland
- Château
