= Treytorrens =

- Municipality
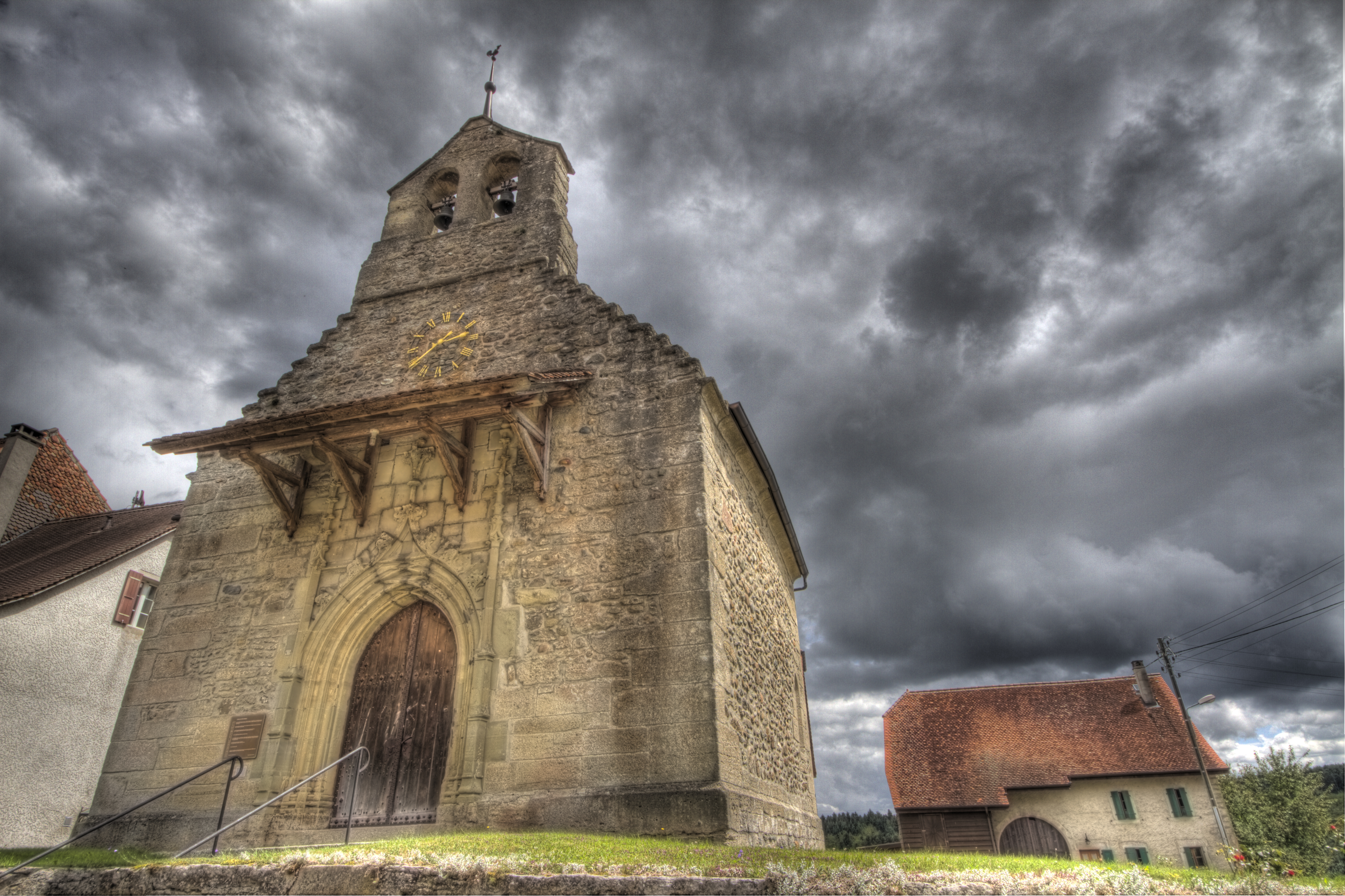
- Church of Saint-Jean-Baptiste in Treytorrens

- Flag Coat of arms
- Location of Treytorrens
- Location within Switzerland Location within Canton of Vaud
- Coordinates: 46°46′17″N 6°48′00″E
- Country: Switzerland
- Canton: Vaud
- District: Broye-Vully

Government
  - Mayor: Syndic; Etienne Gerbex

Area
  - Total: 3.06 km^{2} (1.18 sq mi)
- Elevation: 666 m (2,185 ft)

Population (2000)
  - Total: 124
  - Density: 40.5/km^{2} (105/sq mi)
- Demonym: Les Treytorranais
- Time zone: UTC+01:00 (CET)
  - Summer (DST): UTC+02:00 (CEST)
- Postal code: 1538
- SFOS number: 5828
- ISO 3166 code: CH-VD
- Surrounded by: Champtauroz, Chavannes-le-Chêne, Combremont-le-Grand, Murist (FR), Nuvilly (FR)
- Website: https://www.treytorrens.ch Profile (in French), SFSO statistics

Treytorrens is a municipality in the district of Broye-Vully in the canton of Vaud in Switzerland.

== History ==
Treytorrens has ancient roots, with archaeological evidence pointing to a Roman settlement in the area. The village was first documented in 1194 as Troterens.

During the 12th century, the lords of Treytorrens were initially vassals of the Bishop of Lausanne. However, in the mid-13th century, they recognized the suzerainty of Peter II, Count of Savoy. The seigneury remained under the control of the Treytorrens family until 1543, when it was sold to Pierre Morel of Fribourg. The same year, the seigneury passed to the Molin family of Estavayer, and later in 1685 to the DuGué family, Huguenot refugees who retained possession until 1798.

The village developed around a fortified house dating from the 13th century, known as the "castle" of Treytorrens and mentioned in historical documents from 1543. This maison forte remains visible today and represents the historical center around which the locality formed.

From 1536 to 1798, Treytorrens was part of the bailiwick of Moudon under Bernese rule. Following the Helvetic Republic, it became part of the district of Payerne from 1798 to 2006, when administrative reorganization placed it in the district of Broye-Vully.

The village underwent land consolidation between 1941 and 1943, modernizing its agricultural structure. Treytorrens has remained primarily an agricultural community, with eleven farms operating as of 2005.

== Geography ==
Treytorrens has an area, as of 2009, of 3.1 square kilometers (1.2 mi^{2}). Of this area, 2.31 km^{2} (0.89 mi^{2}) or 75.2% is used for agricultural purposes, while 0.64 km^{2} (0.25 mi^{2}) or 20.8% is forested. Of the rest of the land, 0.15 km^{2} (37 acres) or 4.9% is settled (buildings or roads).

Of the built up area, housing and buildings made up 1.6% and transportation infrastructure made up 2.9%. Out of the forested land, all of the forested land area is covered with heavy forests. Of the agricultural land, 59.6% is used for growing crops and 15.3% is pastures.

The municipality was part of the Payerne District until it was dissolved on 31 August 2006, and Treytorrens became part of the new district of Broye-Vully.

== Coat of arms ==
The blazon of the municipal coat of arms is Gules, three Fishes nainaint Argent.

== Demographics ==
=== Current ===
Treytorrens has a population (as of December 2020) of 114. As of 2008, 0.9% of the population are resident foreign nationals. Over the last 10 years (1999–2009 ) the population has changed at a rate of 0%. It has changed at a rate of -4.3% due to migration and at a rate of 3.5% due to births and deaths.

Most of the population (as of 2000) speaks French (97 or 95.1%), with German being second most common (3 or 2.9%) and Italian being third (1 or 1.0%).

The age distribution of the population (as of 2000) is children and teenagers (0–19 years old) make up 18.6% of the population, while adults (20–64 years old) make up 61.8% and seniors (over 64 years old) make up 19.6%.

As of 2000, there were 38 people who were single and never married in the municipality. There were 46 married individuals, 7 widows or widowers and 11 individuals who are divorced.

As of 2000, there were 39 private households in the municipality, and an average of 2.6 persons per household. There were 8 households that consist of only one person and 2 households with five or more people. Out of a total of 40 households that answered this question, 20.0% were households made up of just one person and there was 1 adult who lived with their parents. Of the rest of the households, there are 9 married couples without children, 18 married couples with children There was one single parent with a child or children. There were 2 households that were made up of unrelated people and 1 household that was made up of some sort of institution or another collective housing.

In 2000 there were 22 single family homes (or 55.0% of the total) out of a total of 40 inhabited buildings. There were 5 multi-family buildings (12.5%), along with 12 multi-purpose buildings that were mostly used for housing (30.0%) and 1 other use buildings (commercial or industrial) that also had some housing (2.5%).

In 2000, a total of 38 apartments (77.6% of the total) were permanently occupied, while 7 apartments (14.3%) were seasonally occupied and 4 apartments (8.2%) were empty. As of 2009, the construction rate of new housing units was 0 new units per 1000 residents. The vacancy rate for the municipality, in 2010, was 3.92%.

=== Historical ===
In 1433, there were 13 hearths, increasing to 16 in 1558. The population was recorded as 80 inhabitants in 1764, reaching its peak of 195 in 1850. The 20th century saw a gradual decline: 164 inhabitants in 1900, 157 in 1950, and 102 in 2000.

== Heritage sites of national significance ==
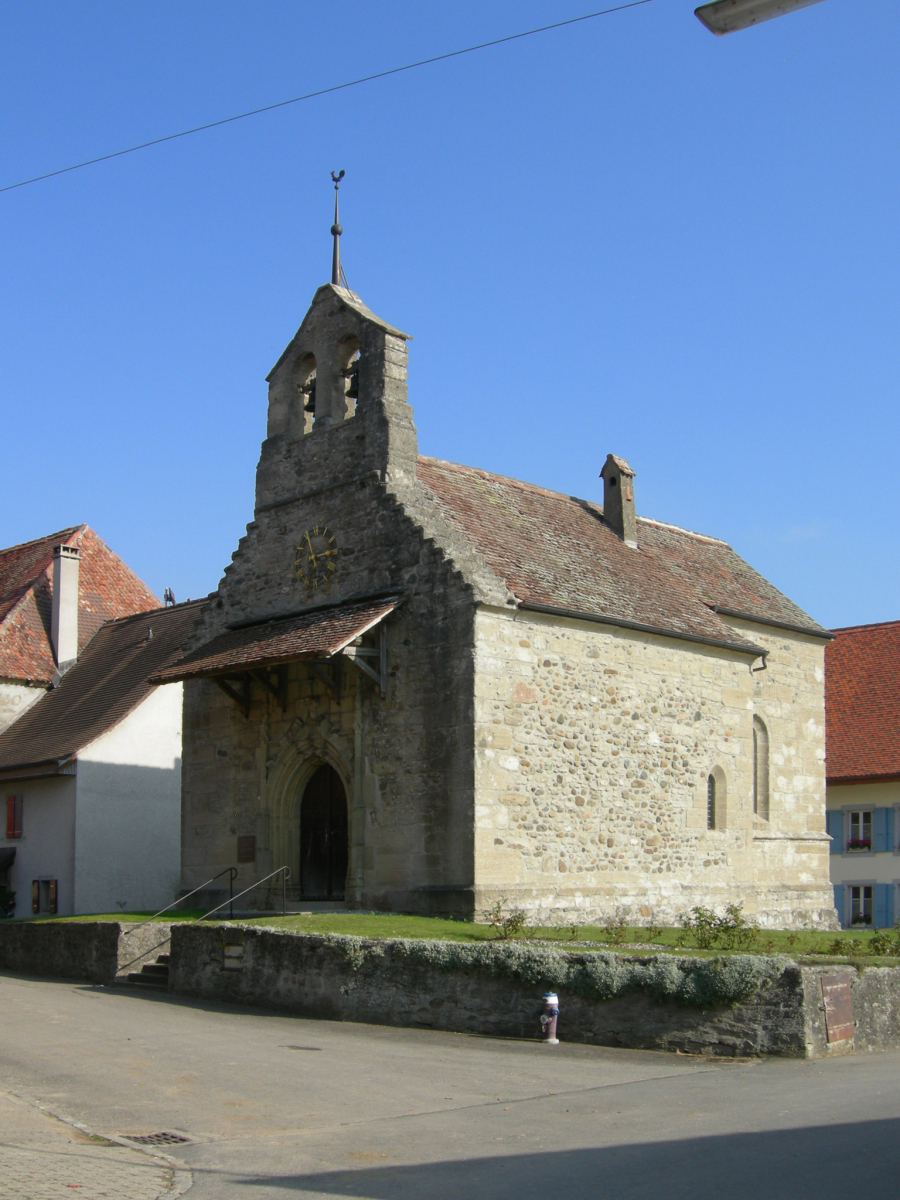
Church of Saint-Jean-Baptiste

The Swiss Reformed church of Saint-Jean-Baptiste is listed as a Swiss heritage site of national significance. The church was reconstructed in the 15th century and underwent restorations in 1907 and 1985.

The entire village of Treytorrens is part of the Inventory of Swiss Heritage Sites.

== Politics ==
In the 2007 federal election the most popular party was the SVP which received 48.66% of the vote. The next three most popular parties were the FDP (20.13%), the PdA Party (7.52%) and the Green Party (6.24%). In the federal election, a total of 45 votes were cast, and the voter turnout was 49.5%.

== Economy ==
As of 2010, Treytorrens had an unemployment rate of 0.8%. As of 2008, there were 21 people employed in the primary economic sector and about 9 businesses involved in this sector. 4 people were employed in the secondary sector and there was 1 business in this sector. No one was employed in the tertiary sector. There were 60 residents of the municipality who were employed in some capacity, of which females made up 36.7% of the workforce.

In 2008 the total number of full-time equivalent jobs was 19. The number of jobs in the primary sector was 15, all of which were in agriculture. The number of jobs in the secondary sector was 4, all of which were in construction.

In 2000, there were 3 workers who commuted into the municipality and 36 workers who commuted away. The municipality is a net exporter of workers, with about 12.0 workers leaving the municipality for every one entering. Of the working population, 11.7% used public transportation to get to work, and 51.7% used a private car.

== Religion ==
From the 2000 census, 14 or 13.7% were Roman Catholic, while 76 or 74.5% belonged to the Swiss Reformed Church. Of the rest of the population, there were 3 individuals (or about 2.94% of the population) who belonged to another Christian church. 8 (or about 7.84% of the population) belonged to no church, are agnostic or atheist, and 2 individuals (or about 1.96% of the population) did not answer the question.

== Education ==
In Treytorrens about 38 or (37.3%) of the population have completed non-mandatory upper secondary education, and 12 or (11.8%) have completed additional higher education (either university or a Fachhochschule). Of the 12 who completed tertiary schooling, 66.7% were Swiss men, 25.0% were Swiss women.

As of 2000, there were 18 students in Treytorrens who came from another municipality, while 14 residents attended schools outside the municipality.
