= Henri-François de Treytorrens =

18th-century Swiss merchant and shipowner active in colonial trade

- Born: October 15, 1729; Yverdon, Switzerland
- Died: April 15, 1782 (aged 52); Marseille, France
- Occupations: Merchant, shipowner
- Known for: Colonial trade in the Indian Ocean
- Spouse: Elisabeth d'Hauterive
- Children: Henriette de Treytorrens
- Parent(s): Jean-Rodolphe de Treytorrens; Henriette Jaccard
- Relatives: David-Philippe de Treytorrens (brother); Frederick Haldimand (cousin)

Henri-François de Treytorrens (15 October 1729 – 15 April 1782) was a Swiss Protestant merchant and shipowner who established himself in Marseille, where he became active in colonial trade, particularly in the Indian Ocean. Born in Yverdon, he was a member of the prominent Treytorrens family and operated maritime trading ventures during the latter half of the 18th century.

== Early life and family ==
Henri-François de Treytorrens was born on 15 October 1729 in Yverdon to Jean-Rodolphe de Treytorrens (1686–1739), an officer in Dutch service who later became lieutenant bailiff of Yverdon, and Henriette Jaccard, daughter of Henri Jaccard, a captain in French service. He was the younger brother of David-Philippe de Treytorrens and cousin to Frederick Haldimand, the British colonial administrator. The family was part of the extensive Treytorrens lineage, and Henri-François had three sisters and eight brothers, six of whom emigrated during their lifetimes to various locations in Europe and overseas, including Marseille, Batavia (Jakarta), and Saint-Domingue (Haiti).

He married Elisabeth d'Hauterive and had one daughter, Henriette de Treytorrens (born before 1801).

== Business ventures ==
Around 1752, Treytorrens established the trading company Martin, de Treytorrens et Cie in Marseille, likely in partnership with his elder brother Jean-Rodolphe de Treytorrens (1715–1791) and a Genevese merchant named André Martin. After his brother's departure from the city, Henri-François continued the commercial operations, probably in association with distant relatives from the Cudrefin branch of the Treytorrens family: François (1744–1800), whose presence in Marseille is documented in 1769, Samuel-Henry (1740–1823), and possibly also the third brother, Frédéric de Treytorrens (1742–1770).

== Colonial trade activities ==
In the early 1770s, taking advantage of the French king's suspension of the French East India Company's monopoly, Treytorrens's company entered the long-distance trade to Île de France (Mauritius), Île Bourbon (Réunion), and the French-controlled coastal trading posts in India, including Mahé, Karaikal, Pondicherry, Yanam, and Chandannagar.

In March 1773, the company chartered a 300-ton vessel, the Iris, from Marseille to the port city of Mocha in Yemen for the coffee trade, returning to Lorient in December 1774. In June 1777, the Iris departed Marseille again for Mocha, but was captured by the British during the ongoing conflict between France and Great Britain over control of Indian trading posts and maritime relay stations. The same year, the company armed another vessel, the 150-ton Baptistine, bound for Île de France, where it was probably sold.

== Decline and final years ==
Faced with the risks of capture by British forces, Marseille shipowners decided to cease making the lengthy voyage to the Indian Ocean islands without military escort. On 10 December 1780, among the 45 vessels anchored in the port of Marseille awaiting military escort from Toulon, was the corvette Résolue, belonging to Treytorrens's company. This represents the last known mention of an armament by this company, which was by then in decline, as evidenced by Henri-François de Treytorrens's succession proceedings recorded in 1782. No evidence exists of the company's involvement in the Atlantic slave trade.

Henri-François de Treytorrens died on 15 April 1782 in Marseille.

== Bibliography ==
- Vuilleumier, Auguste; Reymond, Maxime: «Treytorrens», in: Recueil de généalogies vaudoises, I/2, 1914, pp. 187–242, especially p. 237.
- Rambert, Gaston: Histoire du commerce de Marseille. VI. De 1660 à 1789. Les Colonies, 1959, pp. 349, 579, 580, 584.
- Carrière, Charles: Négociants marseillais au XVIIIe siècle. Contribution à l'étude des économies maritimes, 2 vol., 1973.
- Théry-Lopez, Renée: Une immigration de longue durée. Les Suisses à Marseille, doctoral thesis, Université d'Aix-Marseille, 1986.
