= Bioley-Magnoux =

- Municipality
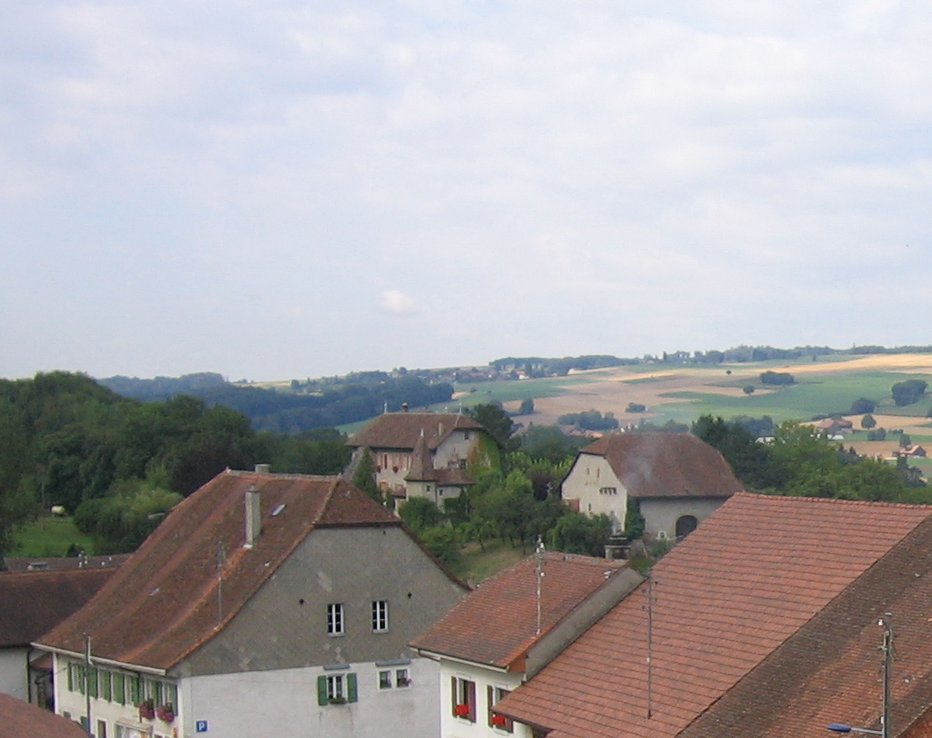
- Bioley-Magnoux village and castle

- Flag Coat of arms
- Location of Bioley-Magnoux
- Location within Switzerland Location within Canton of Vaud
- Coordinates: 46°44′N 6°43′E
- Country: Switzerland
- Canton: Vaud
- District: Jura-Nord Vaudois

Government
  - Mayor: Jean-Claude Groux

Area
  - Total: 4.27 km^{2} (1.65 sq mi)
- Elevation: 573 m (1,880 ft)

Population (2003)
  - Total: 163
  - Density: 38.2/km^{2} (98.9/sq mi)
- Time zone: UTC+01:00 (CET)
  - Summer (DST): UTC+02:00 (CEST)
- Postal code: 1407
- SFOS number: 5903
- ISO 3166 code: CH-VD
- Surrounded by: Chanéaz, Correvon, Donneloye, Gossens, Ogens, Oppens, Orzens, Prahins
- Website: https://www.bioley-magnoux.ch Profile (in French), SFSO statistics

Bioley-Magnoux (French pronunciation: [bjɔlɛ maɲu]) is a municipality in the district of Jura-Nord Vaudois of the canton of Vaud in Switzerland.

== History ==
Bioley-Magnoux is first mentioned in 1228 as Biolai.

The village is located 10 km (6.2 mi) east of Yverdon and played some historic role in previous times. It is dominated by a medieval castle the origins of which date back to 1105. Charles the Bold, Duke of Burgundy 1433–1477, last reigning duke of Burgundy (1467–1477), son and successor of Philip the Good, made his quarters at the castle early in June 1476 on his way to Murten where he lost the battle against the confederates. The castle is now home to the Jonas-Foundation.

== Geography ==
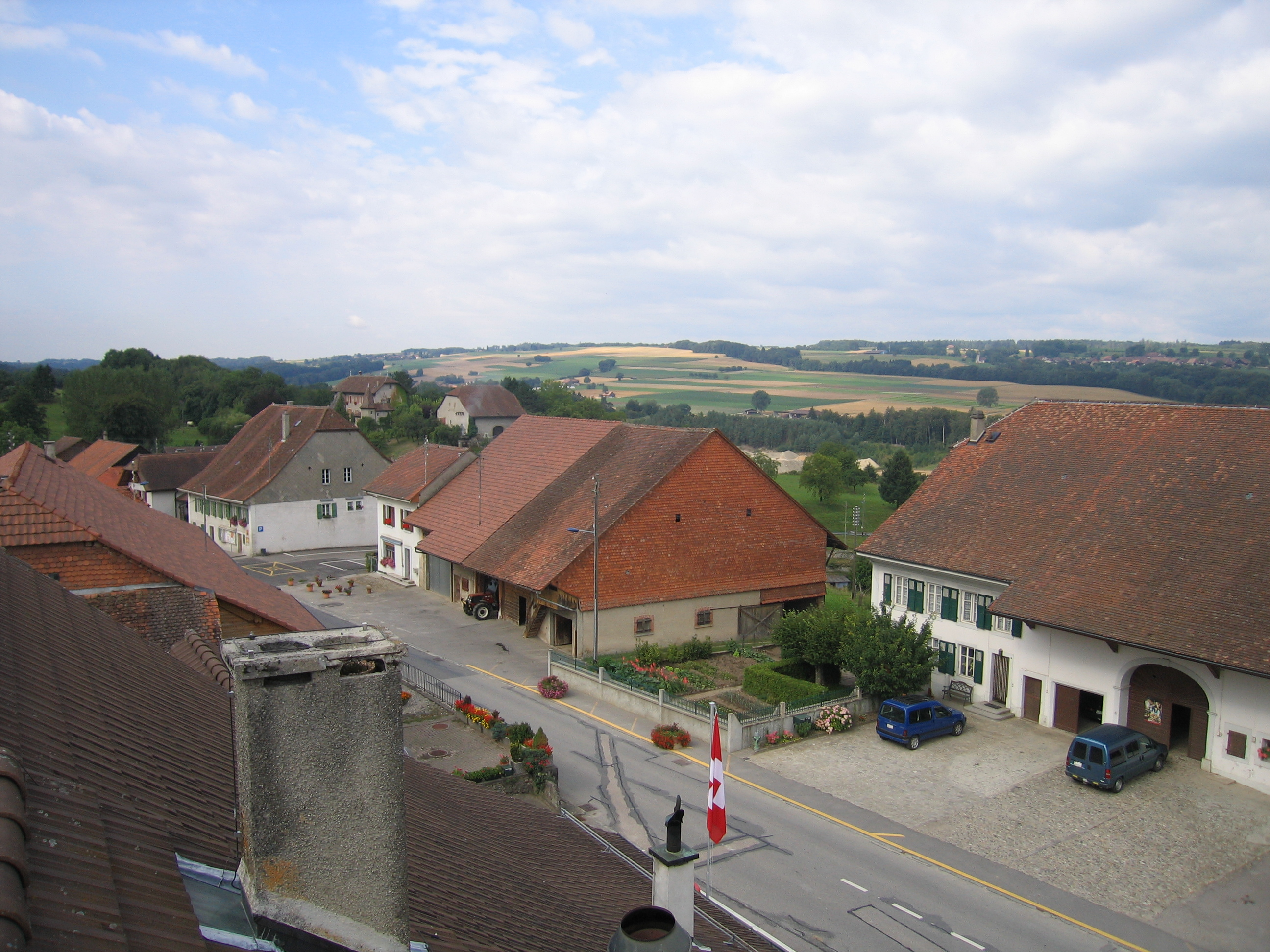
Bioley-Magnoux

Bioley-Magnoux has an area, as of 2009, of 4.3 square kilometers (1.7 mi^{2}). Of this area, 2.84 km^{2} (1.10 mi^{2}) or 66.5% is used for agricultural purposes, while 1.12 km^{2} (0.43 mi^{2}) or 26.2% is forested. Of the rest of the land, 0.29 km^{2} (0.11 mi^{2}) or 6.8% is settled (buildings or roads), 0.03 km^{2} (7.4 acres) or 0.7% is either rivers or lakes and 0.01 km^{2} (2.5 acres) or 0.2% is unproductive land.

Of the built up area, housing and buildings made up 2.1% and transportation infrastructure made up 2.1%. Power and water infrastructure as well as other special developed areas made up 2.3% of the area Out of the forested land, 25.1% of the total land area is heavily forested and 1.2% is covered with orchards or small clusters of trees. Of the agricultural land, 52.7% is used for growing crops and 13.1% is pastures. All the water in the municipality is flowing water.

The municipality was part of the Yverdon District until it was dissolved on 31 August 2006, and Bioley-Magnoux became part of the new district of Jura-Nord Vaudois.

The municipality is located on the border of the Gros-de-Vaud and the Nord-Vaudois regions. It is situated on a plateau on the hillside above the right bank of the Mentu river. It consists of the linear village of Bioley-Magnoux.

== Coat of arms ==
The blazon of the municipal coat of arms is Azure, a wavy chevron Or, around it three birch leaves Argent two over one, pointing to the middle chief.

== Demographics ==
Bioley-Magnoux has a population (as of December 2020) of 230. As of 2008, 4.4% of the population are resident foreign nationals. Over the last 10 years (1999–2009) the population has changed at a rate of -4.5%. It has changed at a rate of -1.1% due to migration and at a rate of -3.4% due to births and deaths.

Most of the population (as of 2000) speaks French (157 or 92.9%) as their first language, with German being second most common (9 or 5.3%) and Portuguese being third (2 or 1.2%).

The age distribution, as of 2009, in Bioley-Magnoux is; 9 children or 5.4% of the population are between 0 and 9 years old and 23 teenagers or 13.7% are between 10 and 19. Of the adult population, 20 people or 11.9% of the population are between 20 and 29 years old. 25 people or 14.9% are between 30 and 39, 23 people or 13.7% are between 40 and 49, and 29 people or 17.3% are between 50 and 59. The senior population distribution is 13 people or 7.7% of the population are between 60 and 69 years old, 14 people or 8.3% are between 70 and 79, there are 12 people or 7.1% who are between 80 and 89.

As of 2000, there were 57 people who were single and never married in the municipality. There were 100 married individuals, 9 widows or widowers and 3 individuals who are divorced.

As of 2000, there were 68 private households in the municipality, and an average of 2.5 persons per household. There were 16 households that consist of only one person and 6 households with five or more people. Out of a total of 69 households that answered this question, 23.2% were households made up of just one person. Of the rest of the households, there are 27 married couples without children, 22 married couples with children There were 3 single parents with a child or children.

In 2000 there were 33 single family homes (or 57.9% of the total) out of a total of 57 inhabited buildings. There were 7 multi-family buildings (12.3%), along with 14 multi-purpose buildings that were mostly used for housing (24.6%) and 3 other use buildings (commercial or industrial) that also had some housing (5.3%).

In 2000, a total of 62 apartments (87.3% of the total) were permanently occupied, while 8 apartments (11.3%) were seasonally occupied and one apartment was empty. As of 2009, the construction rate of new housing units was 6 new units per 1000 residents. The vacancy rate for the municipality, in 2010, was 0%.

The historical population is given in the following chart:

== Sights ==
The village is known for its annual Ascension Day road race which attracts participation from the surrounding region.

== Politics ==
In the 2007 federal election the most popular party was the SVP which received 52.19% of the vote. The next three most popular parties were the FDP (18.81%), the SP (9.95%) and the Other (8.7%). In the federal election, a total of 74 votes were cast, and the voter turnout was 58.7%.

== Economy ==
As of 2010, Bioley-Magnoux had an unemployment rate of 2.9%. As of 2008, there were 22 people employed in the primary economic sector and about 8 businesses involved in this sector. 5 people were employed in the secondary sector and there were 3 businesses in this sector. 5 people were employed in the tertiary sector, with 1 business in this sector. There were 71 residents of the municipality who were employed in some capacity, of which females made up 39.4% of the workforce.

In 2008 the total number of full-time equivalent jobs was 21. The number of jobs in the primary sector was 13, all of which were in agriculture. The number of jobs in the secondary sector was 4, all of which were in construction. The number of jobs in the tertiary sector was 4, all in a hotel or restaurant.

In 2000, there were 48 workers who commuted away from the municipality. Of the working population, 2.8% used public transportation to get to work, and 66.2% used a private car.

== Religion ==
From the 2000 census, 13 or 7.7% were Roman Catholic, while 144 or 85.2% belonged to the Swiss Reformed Church. Of the rest of the population, there was one individual who belongs to another Christian church, and one other individual who belonged to another church. Ten (or about 5.92% of the population) belonged to no church, are agnostic or atheist.

== Education ==
In Bioley-Magnoux about 64 or (37.9%) of the population have completed non-mandatory upper secondary education, and 16 or (9.5%) have completed additional higher education (either university or a Fachhochschule). Of the 16 who completed tertiary schooling, 75.0% were Swiss men, 12.5% were Swiss women.

In the 2009/2010 school year there were a total of 16 students in the Bioley-Magnoux school district. In the Vaud cantonal school system, two years of non-obligatory pre-school are provided by the political districts. During the school year, the political district provided pre-school care for a total of 578 children of which 359 children (62.1%) received subsidized pre-school care. The canton's primary school program requires students to attend for four years. There were 5 students in the municipal primary school program. The obligatory lower secondary school program lasts for six years and there were 11 students in those schools.

As of 2000, there were 28 students from Bioley-Magnoux who attended schools outside the municipality.
