= Donneloye =

- Municipality
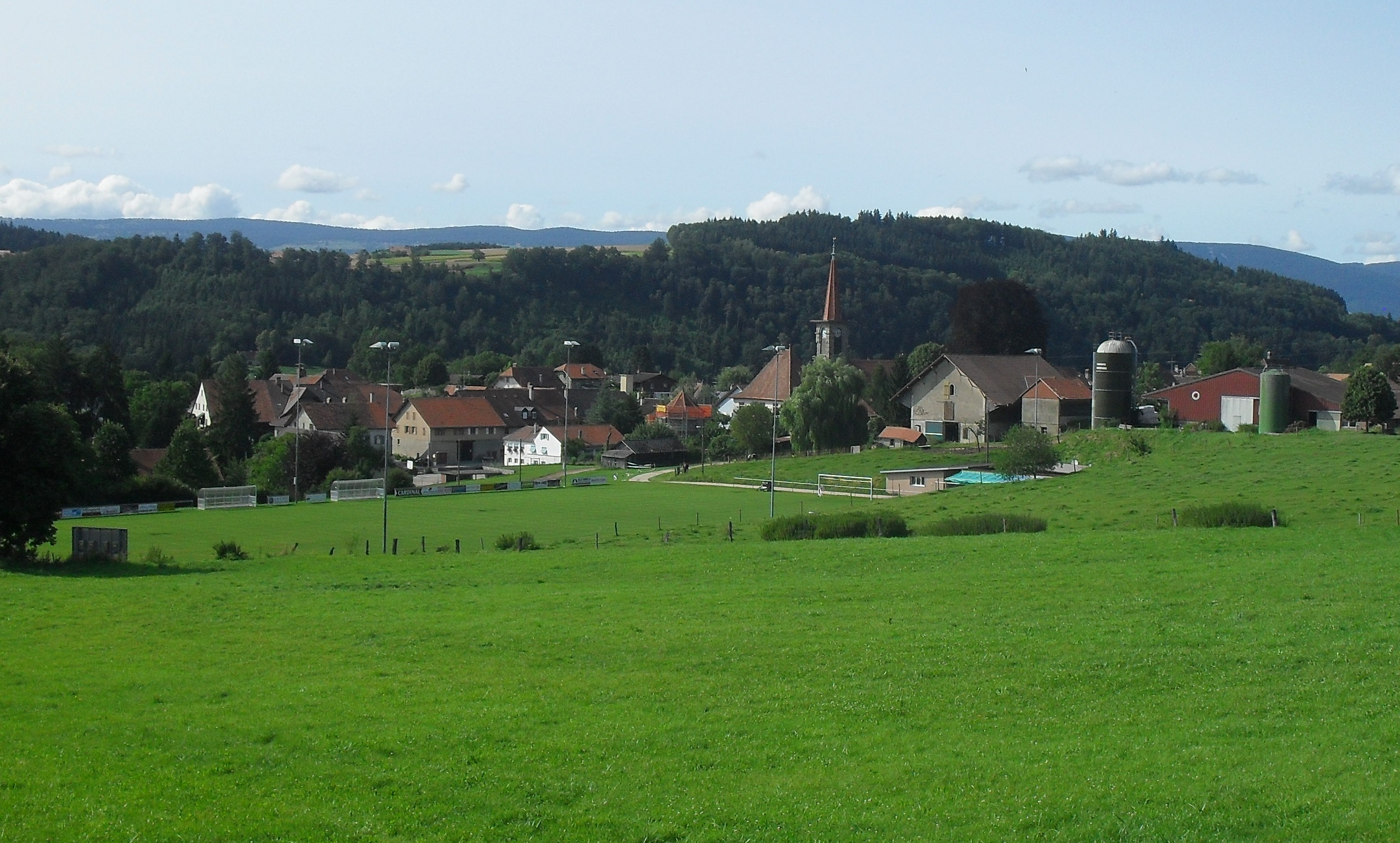

- Flag Coat of arms
- Location of Donneloye
- Location within Switzerland Location within Canton of Vaud
- Coordinates: 46°45′N 6°43′E
- Country: Switzerland
- Canton: Vaud
- District: Jura-Nord Vaudois

Government
  - Mayor: Syndic; Benoît Reymondin

Area
  - Total: 3.72 km^{2} (1.44 sq mi)
- Elevation: 540 m (1,770 ft)

Population (2003)
  - Total: 324
  - Density: 87.1/km^{2} (226/sq mi)
- Time zone: UTC+01:00 (CET)
  - Summer (DST): UTC+02:00 (CEST)
- Postal code: 1407
- SFOS number: 5913
- ISO 3166 code: CH-VD
- Surrounded by: Bioley-Magnoux, Cronay, Gossens, Mézery-près-Donneloye, Molondin, Prahins, Yvonand
- Website: www.donneloye.ch

Donneloye is a municipality in the district of Jura-Nord Vaudois of the canton of Vaud in Switzerland.

== History ==
Donneloye is first mentioned in 1150 as Donnolui.

In the 12th century the village was dominated by a branch of a noble family from Goumoens by the name of Donneloye.

The river Mentue flows through the commune. The first stone bridge over this river was built during the Bernese period in 1754. Later becoming too narrow, it was widened in 1892 to form the present bridge on the Yverdon/Moudon road.

On 11 March 2007, the community decided to merge their commune with those of the neighbouring Gossens and Mézery-près-Donneloye communes, with effect from 1 January 2008.

The municipality of Prahins merged on 1 January 2012 into Donneloye.

== The Château of Donneloye ==
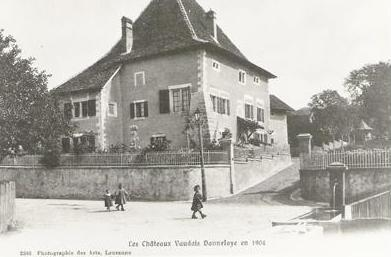
The château of Donneloye in 1904

The château of Donneloye was probably first built in the 15th century and passed through many hands from the 16th to the 19th centuries. Charles III, Duke of Savoy sold it in 1534 to Marguerite de Bellevaux, who sold it on to Guillaume Regnauld who in turn sold it to Marguerite de Chanéaz in 1597.

After passing through other hands, the château was purchased in 1652 by Jean-Philippe Loys, whose family possessed it until the end of the 18th century, when the conseiller d'état Jacques-François Viquerat (1838–1904) bought it.

The building today consists of a principal rectangular body divided by a wide central corridor. At the end of the present garden is a massive round tower, probably a dovecote. The building has no sculptures like those of the château of Avenches, but it is a typical example of a rural medieval manor house. The château is currently in private hands.

== Geography ==
Aerial view (1964)

Donneloye has an area, as of 2009, of 6.6 square kilometers (2.5 mi^{2}). Of this area, 4.59 km^{2} (1.77 mi^{2}) or 69.3% is used for agricultural purposes, while 1.51 km^{2} (0.58 mi^{2}) or 22.8% is forested. Of the rest of the land, 0.46 km^{2} (0.18 mi^{2}) or 6.9% is settled (buildings or roads), 0.03 km^{2} (7.4 acres) or 0.5% is either rivers or lakes.

Of the built up area, housing and buildings made up 3.2% and transportation infrastructure made up 2.4%. Out of the forested land, all of the forested land area is covered with heavy forests. Of the agricultural land, 56.2% is used for growing crops and 12.7% is pastures. All the water in the municipality is flowing water.

The area after the merger is 9.01 km^{2} (3.48 sq mi).

The municipality was part of the Yverdon District until it was dissolved on 31 August 2006, and Donneloye became part of the new district of Jura-Nord Vaudois.

The municipality is located on the right side of the Mentue river. It consists of the village of Donneloye and a number of hamlets.

== Coat of arms ==
The blazon of the municipal coat of arms is Sable, a chief indented Or.

== Demographics ==
Donneloye has a population (as of December 2020) of 828. As of 2008, 5.3% of the population are resident foreign nationals. Over the last 10 years (1999–2009 ) the population has changed at a rate of 20.3%. It has changed at a rate of 10.3% due to migration and at a rate of 10.5% due to births and deaths.

Most of the population (as of 2000) speaks French (300 or 93.8%) as their first language, with German being second most common (12 or 3.8%) and Portuguese being third (4 or 1.3%). There is 1 person who speaks Italian.

The age distribution, as of 2009, in Donneloye is; 79 children or 13.3% of the population are between 0 and 9 years old and 83 teenagers or 14.0% are between 10 and 19. Of the adult population, 69 people or 11.7% of the population are between 20 and 29 years old. 85 people or 14.4% are between 30 and 39, 92 people or 15.5% are between 40 and 49, and 72 people or 12.2% are between 50 and 59. The senior population distribution is 58 people or 9.8% of the population are between 60 and 69 years old, 31 people or 5.2% are between 70 and 79, there are 20 people or 3.4% who are between 80 and 89, and there are 3 people or 0.5% who are 90 and older.

As of 2000, there were 134 people who were single and never married in the municipality. There were 156 married individuals, 20 widows or widowers and 10 individuals who are divorced.

As of 2000, there were 181 private households in the municipality, and an average of 2.7 persons per household. There were 28 households that consist of only one person and 16 households with five or more people. Out of a total of 120 households that answered this question, 23.3% were households made up of just one person. Of the rest of the households, there are 37 married couples without children, 42 married couples with children There were 6 single parents with a child or children. There were 6 households that were made up of unrelated people and 1 household that was made up of some sort of institution or another collective housing.

In 2000 there were 44 single family homes (or 61.1% of the total) out of a total of 72 inhabited buildings. There were 11 multi-family buildings (15.3%), along with 13 multi-purpose buildings that were mostly used for housing (18.1%) and 4 other use buildings (commercial or industrial) that also had some housing (5.6%).

In 2000, a total of 86 apartments (88.7% of the total) were permanently occupied, while 2 apartments (2.1%) were seasonally occupied and 9 apartments (9.3%) were empty. As of 2009, the construction rate of new housing units was 5.1 new units per 1000 residents. The vacancy rate for the municipality, in 2010, was 1.86%.

The historical population is given in the following chart:

== Sights ==
The entire village of Prahins is designated as part of the Inventory of Swiss Heritage Sites.

== Politics ==
In the 2007 federal election the most popular party was the SVP which received 41.39% of the vote. The next three most popular parties were the SP (16.63%), the Green Party (12.36%) and the FDP (9.86%). In the federal election, a total of 127 votes were cast, and the voter turnout was 51.4%.

== Economy ==
As of 2010, Donneloye had an unemployment rate of 3.8%. As of 2008, there were 42 people employed in the primary economic sector and about 14 businesses involved in this sector. 44 people were employed in the secondary sector and there were 14 businesses in this sector. 19 people were employed in the tertiary sector, with 11 businesses in this sector. There were 166 residents of the municipality who were employed in some capacity, of which females made up 42.2% of the workforce.

In 2008 the total number of full-time equivalent jobs was 82. The number of jobs in the primary sector was 26, all of which were in agriculture. The number of jobs in the secondary sector was 41 of which 13 or (31.7%) were in manufacturing and 28 (68.3%) were in construction. The number of jobs in the tertiary sector was 15. In the tertiary sector; 4 or 26.7% were in wholesale or retail sales or the repair of motor vehicles, 1 was in the movement and storage of goods, 2 or 13.3% were in a hotel or restaurant, 1 was in the information industry, 1 was the insurance or financial industry, 2 or 13.3% were technical professionals or scientists, 4 or 26.7% were in education.

In 2000, there were 26 workers who commuted into the municipality and 117 workers who commuted away. The municipality is a net exporter of workers, with about 4.5 workers leaving the municipality for every one entering. Of the working population, 7.6% used public transportation to get to work, and 69.6% used a private car.

== Religion ==
From the 2000 census, 48 or 15.0% were Roman Catholic, while 220 or 68.8% belonged to the Swiss Reformed Church. Of the rest of the population, there was 1 member of an Orthodox church, and there were 28 individuals (or about 8.75% of the population) who belonged to another Christian church. 31 (or about 9.69% of the population) belonged to no church, are agnostic or atheist, and 5 individuals (or about 1.56% of the population) did not answer the question.

== Education ==
In Donneloye about 111 or (34.7%) of the population have completed non-mandatory upper secondary education, and 48 or (15.0%) have completed additional higher education (either university or a Fachhochschule). Of the 48 who completed tertiary schooling, 62.5% were Swiss men, 29.2% were Swiss women.

In the 2009/2010 school year there were a total of 94 students in the Donneloye school district. In the Vaud cantonal school system, two years of non-obligatory pre-school are provided by the political districts. During the school year, the political district provided pre-school care for a total of 578 children of which 359 children (62.1%) received subsidized pre-school care. The canton's primary school program requires students to attend for four years. There were 49 students in the municipal primary school program. The obligatory lower secondary school program lasts for six years and there were 45 students in those schools.

As of 2000, there were 23 students in Donneloye who came from another municipality, while 33 residents attended schools outside the municipality.
