= Prahins =

- Former municipality
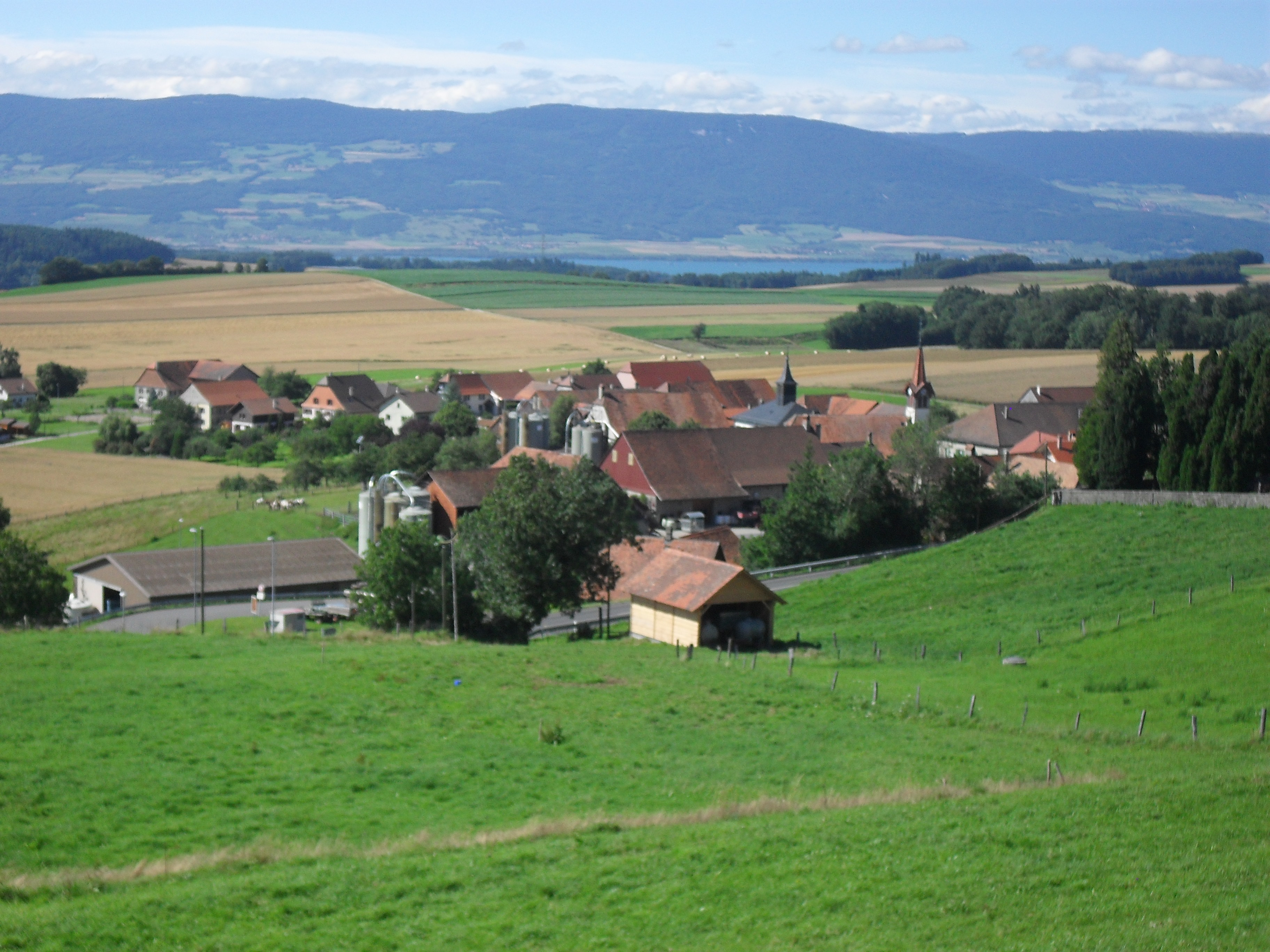

- Flag Coat of arms
- Location of Prahins
- Location within Switzerland Location within Canton of Vaud
- Coordinates: 46°44′N 6°44′E
- Country: Switzerland
- Canton: Vaud
- District: Jura-Nord Vaudois

Area
  - Total: 2.42 km^{2} (0.93 sq mi)
- Elevation: 693 m (2,274 ft)

Population (2010)
  - Total: 125
  - Density: 51.7/km^{2} (134/sq mi)
- Time zone: UTC+01:00 (CET)
  - Summer (DST): UTC+02:00 (CEST)
- Postal code: 1408
- SFOS number: 5927
- ISO 3166 code: CH-VD
- Surrounded by: Bioley-Magnoux, Chanéaz, Démoret, Donneloye, Mézery-près-Donneloye, Molondin
- Website: Profile (in French), SFSO statistics

Prahins is a former municipality in the district of Jura-Nord Vaudois of the canton of Vaud in Switzerland. The municipality of Prahins merged on 1 January 2012 into the municipality of Donneloye.

== History ==
Prahins is first mentioned in 1186 as Prehes.

== Geography ==
Prahins had an area, as of 2009, of 2.4 square kilometers (0.93 mi^{2}). Of this area, 1.59 km^{2} (0.61 mi^{2}) or 66.5% is used for agricultural purposes, while 0.63 km^{2} (0.24 mi^{2}) or 26.4% is forested. Of the rest of the land, 0.14 km^{2} (35 acres) or 5.9% is settled (buildings or roads).

Of the built up area, housing and buildings made up 2.1% and transportation infrastructure made up 3.3%. Out of the forested land, all of the forested land area is covered with heavy forests. Of the agricultural land, 52.7% is used for growing crops and 13.0% is pastures.

The former municipality was part of the Yverdon District until it was dissolved on 31 August 2006, and Prahins became part of the new district of Jura-Nord Vaudois.

The former municipality is located at the intersection of the Yverdon-Moudon and Morges-Payerne roads, on the right bank of the Mentue river. It consists of the linear village of Prahins.

== Coat of arms ==
The blazon of the municipal coat of arms is Vair, in Chief Azure a Wing Or.

== Demographics ==
Prahins had a population (as of 2010) of 125. As of 2008, 7.0% of the population are resident foreign nationals. Over the last 10 years (1999–2009 ) the population has changed at a rate of 1.6%. It has changed at a rate of 2.3% due to migration and at a rate of -0.8% due to births and deaths.

Most of the population (as of 2000) speaks French (116 or 92.1%) as their first language, with German being second most common (8 or 6.3%) and English being third (2 or 1.6%).

The age distribution, as of 2009, in Prahins is; 8 children or 6.1% of the population are between 0 and 9 years old and 23 teenagers or 17.6% are between 10 and 19. Of the adult population, 16 people or 12.2% of the population are between 20 and 29 years old. 7 people or 5.3% are between 30 and 39, 24 people or 18.3% are between 40 and 49, and 20 people or 15.3% are between 50 and 59. The senior population distribution is 18 people or 13.7% of the population are between 60 and 69 years old, 7 people or 5.3% are between 70 and 79, there are 6 people or 4.6% who are between 80 and 89, and there are 2 people or 1.5% who are 90 and older.

As of 2000, there were 48 people who were single and never married in the municipality. There were 63 married individuals, 7 widows or widowers and 8 individuals who are divorced.

As of 2000 the average number of residents per living room was 0.58 which is about equal to the cantonal average of 0.61 per room. In this case, a room is defined as space of a housing unit of at least 4 m^{2} (43 sq ft) as normal bedrooms, dining rooms, living rooms, kitchens and habitable cellars and attics. About 54.3% of the total households were owner occupied, or in other words did not pay rent (though they may have a mortgage or a rent-to-own agreement).

As of 2000, there were 46 private households in the municipality, and an average of 2.7 persons per household. There were 11 households that consist of only one person and 7 households with five or more people. Out of a total of 47 households that answered this question, 23.4% were households made up of just one person. Of the rest of the households, there are 11 married couples without children, 18 married couples with children There were 5 single parents with a child or children. There was 1 household that was made up of unrelated people and 1 household that was made up of some sort of institution or another collective housing.

In 2000 there were 16 single family homes (or 44.4% of the total) out of a total of 36 inhabited buildings. There were 5 multi-family buildings (13.9%), along with 11 multi-purpose buildings that were mostly used for housing (30.6%) and 4 other use buildings (commercial or industrial) that also had some housing (11.1%).

In 2000, a total of 46 apartments (85.2% of the total) were permanently occupied, while 2 apartments (3.7%) were seasonally occupied and 6 apartments (11.1%) were empty. As of 2009, the construction rate of new housing units was 0 new units per 1000 residents. The vacancy rate for the municipality, in 2010, was 0%.

The historical population is given in the following chart:

== Sights ==
The entire village of Prahins is designated as part of the Inventory of Swiss Heritage Sites.

== Politics ==
In the 2007 federal election the most popular party was the SVP which received 28.89% of the vote. The next three most popular parties were the Green Party (19.77%), the SP (19.29%) and the FDP (16.31%). In the federal election, a total of 60 votes were cast, and the voter turnout was 64.5%.

== Economy ==
As of 2010, Prahins had an unemployment rate of 4.4%. As of 2008, there were 24 people employed in the primary economic sector and about 10 businesses involved in this sector. No one was employed in the secondary sector. 4 people were employed in the tertiary sector, with 2 businesses in this sector. There were 60 residents of the municipality who were employed in some capacity, of which females made up 53.3% of the workforce.

In 2008 the total number of full-time equivalent jobs was 21. The number of jobs in the primary sector was 18, all of which were in agriculture. There were no jobs in the secondary sector. The number of jobs in the tertiary sector was 3. In the tertiary sector; 1 was in the sale or repair of motor vehicles and 2 were in a hotel or restaurant.

In 2000, there were 4 workers who commuted into the municipality and 40 workers who commuted away. The municipality is a net exporter of workers, with about 10.0 workers leaving the municipality for every one entering. Of the working population, 8.3% used public transportation to get to work, and 58.3% used a private car.

== Religion ==
From the 2000 census, 13 or 10.3% were Roman Catholic, while 101 or 80.2% belonged to the Swiss Reformed Church. Of the rest of the population, there was 1 individual who belongs to another Christian church. 10 (or about 7.94% of the population) belonged to no church, are agnostic or atheist, and 1 individuals (or about 0.79% of the population) did not answer the question.

== Education ==
In Prahins about 35 or (27.8%) of the population have completed non-mandatory upper secondary education, and 21 or (16.7%) have completed additional higher education (either university or a Fachhochschule). Of the 21 who completed tertiary schooling, 47.6% were Swiss men, 42.9% were Swiss women.

In the 2009/2010 school year there were a total of 17 students in the Prahins school district. In the Vaud cantonal school system, two years of non-obligatory pre-school are provided by the political districts. During the school year, the political district provided pre-school care for a total of 578 children of which 359 children (62.1%) received subsidized pre-school care. The canton's primary school program requires students to attend for four years. There were 5 students in the municipal primary school program. The obligatory lower secondary school program lasts for six years and there were 12 students in those schools.

As of 2000, there were 32 students from Prahins who attended schools outside the municipality.
