= Démoret =

- Municipality
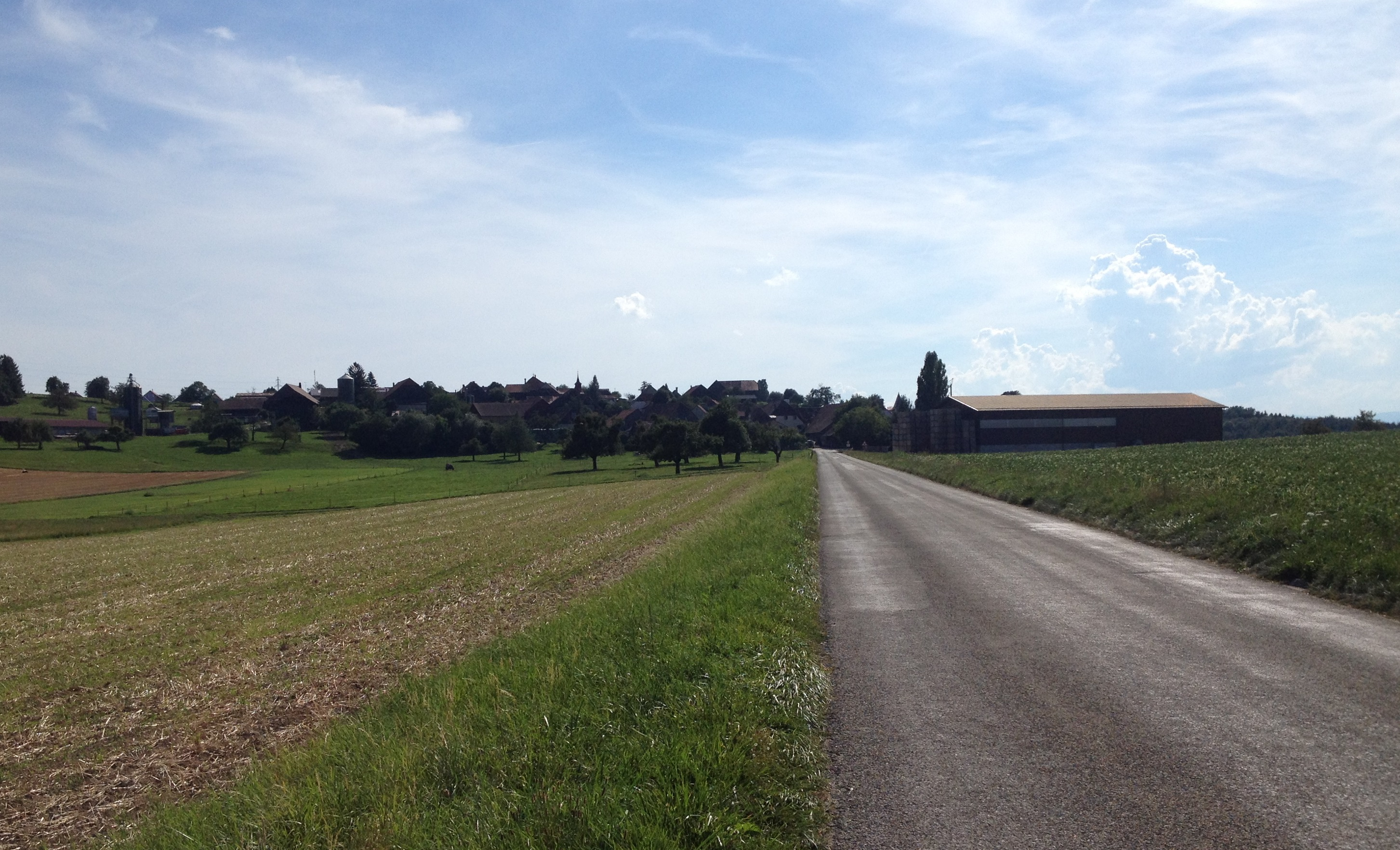

- Flag Coat of arms
- Location of Démoret
- Location within Switzerland Location within Canton of Vaud
- Coordinates: 46°45′N 6°45′E
- Country: Switzerland
- Canton: Vaud
- District: Jura-Nord Vaudois

Government
  - Mayor: Syndic

Area
  - Total: 4.3 km^{2} (1.7 sq mi)
- Elevation: 733 m (2,405 ft)

Population (2003)
  - Total: 135
  - Density: 31/km^{2} (81/sq mi)
- Time zone: UTC+01:00 (CET)
  - Summer (DST): UTC+02:00 (CEST)
- Postal code: 1415
- SFOS number: 5912
- ISO 3166 code: CH-VD
- Surrounded by: Champtauroz, Chanéaz, Chêne-Pâquier, Molondin, Prahins, Vuissens (FR)
- Website: https://www.demoret.ch Profile (in French), SFSO statistics

Démoret is a municipality in the district of Jura-Nord Vaudois of the canton of Vaud in Switzerland.

== History ==
Démoret is first mentioned in 1154 as Donmores. In 1453 it was mentioned as Demoret.

== Geography ==
Aerial view (1964)

Démoret has an area, as of 2009, of 4.3 square kilometers (1.7 mi^{2}). Of this area, 3.37 km^{2} (1.30 mi^{2}) or 78.9% is used for agricultural purposes, while 0.71 km^{2} (0.27 mi^{2}) or 16.6% is forested. Of the rest of the land, 0.2 km^{2} (0.077 mi^{2}) or 4.7% is settled (buildings or roads).

Of the built up area, housing and buildings made up 2.1% and transportation infrastructure made up 2.3%. Out of the forested land, all of the forested land area is covered with heavy forests. Of the agricultural land, 72.1% is used for growing crops and 6.1% is pastures.

The municipality was part of the Yverdon District until it was dissolved on 31 August 2006, and Démoret became part of the new district of Jura-Nord Vaudois.

The rural municipality is located along both sides of the main road in the northern Jorat plateau between Broye and Mentue.

== Coat of arms ==
The blazon of the municipal coat of arms is Sable, a Dolphin crowned haurient embowed Or.

== Demographics ==
Démoret has a population (as of December 2020) of 158. As of 2008, 6.3% of the population are resident foreign nationals. Over the last 10 years (1999–2009 ) the population has changed at a rate of -3.8%. It has changed at a rate of -3.1% due to migration and at a rate of -0.8% due to births and deaths.

Most of the population (as of 2000) speaks French (129 or 97.0%) as their first language, with German being second most common (2 or 1.5%) and Portuguese being third (2 or 1.5%).

The age distribution, as of 2009, in Démoret is; 8 children or 6.3% of the population are between 0 and 9 years old and 24 teenagers or 19.0% are between 10 and 19. Of the adult population, 16 people or 12.7% of the population are between 20 and 29 years old. 9 people or 7.1% are between 30 and 39, 21 people or 16.7% are between 40 and 49, and 21 people or 16.7% are between 50 and 59. The senior population distribution is 8 people or 6.3% of the population are between 60 and 69 years old, 8 people or 6.3% are between 70 and 79, there are 10 people or 7.9% who are between 80 and 89, and there is 1 person who is 90 and older.

As of 2000, there were 55 people who were single and never married in the municipality. There were 69 married individuals, 5 widows or widowers and 4 individuals who are divorced.

As of 2000, there were 49 private households in the municipality, and an average of 2.7 persons per household. There were 12 households that consist of only one person and 8 households with five or more people. Out of a total of 49 households that answered this question, 24.5% were households made up of just one person. Of the rest of the households, there are 16 married couples without children, 19 married couples with children There were 2 single parents with a child or children.

In 2000 there were 18 single family homes (or 45.0% of the total) out of a total of 40 inhabited buildings. There were 2 multi-family buildings (5.0%), along with 17 multi-purpose buildings that were mostly used for housing (42.5%) and 3 other use buildings (commercial or industrial) that also had some housing (7.5%).

In 2000, a total of 49 apartments (94.2% of the total) were permanently occupied, while 1 apartment was seasonally occupied and 2 apartments (3.8%) were empty. As of 2009, the construction rate of new housing units was 0 new units per 1000 residents. The vacancy rate for the municipality, in 2010, was 0%.

The historical population is given in the following chart:

== Sights ==
The entire village of Démoret is designated as part of the Inventory of Swiss Heritage Sites.

== Politics ==
In the 2007 federal election the most popular party was the SVP which received 41.3% of the vote. The next three most popular parties were the FDP (14.22%), the SP (12.57%) and the Other (8.99%). In the federal election, a total of 61 votes were cast, and the voter turnout was 67.0%.

== Economy ==
As of 2010, Démoret had an unemployment rate of 0.4%. As of 2008, there were 33 people employed in the primary economic sector and about 12 businesses involved in this sector. 10 people were employed in the secondary sector and there were 2 businesses in this sector. 5 people were employed in the tertiary sector, with 3 businesses in this sector. There were 65 residents of the municipality who were employed in some capacity, of which females made up 41.5% of the workforce.

In 2008 the total number of full-time equivalent jobs was 34. The number of jobs in the primary sector was 22, all of which were in agriculture. The number of jobs in the secondary sector was 9, all of which were in manufacturing. The number of jobs in the tertiary sector was 3. In the tertiary sector; 2 or 66.7% were in wholesale or retail sales or the repair of motor vehicles, 1 was a technical professional or scientist, .

In 2000, there were 11 workers who commuted into the municipality and 28 workers who commuted away. The municipality is a net exporter of workers, with about 2.5 workers leaving the municipality for every one entering. Of the working population, 4.6% used public transportation to get to work, and 38.5% used a private car.

== Religion ==
From the 2000 census, 15 or 11.3% were Roman Catholic, while 99 or 74.4% belonged to the Swiss Reformed Church. Of the rest of the population, there were 18 individuals (or about 13.53% of the population) who belonged to another Christian church. 10 (or about 7.52% of the population) belonged to no church, are agnostic or atheist.

== Education ==
In Démoret about 43 or (32.3%) of the population have completed non-mandatory upper secondary education, and 16 or (12.0%) have completed additional higher education (either university or a Fachhochschule). Of the 16 who completed tertiary schooling, 62.5% were Swiss men, 37.5% were Swiss women.

In the 2009/2010 school year there were a total of 16 students in the Démoret school district. In the Vaud cantonal school system, two years of non-obligatory pre-school are provided by the political districts. During the school year, the political district provided pre-school care for a total of 578 children of which 359 children (62.1%) received subsidized pre-school care. The canton's primary school program requires students to attend for four years. There were 5 students in the municipal primary school program. The obligatory lower secondary school program lasts for six years and there were 11 students in those schools.

As of 2000, there were 2 students in Démoret who came from another municipality, while 31 residents attended schools outside the municipality.
