= Chêne-Pâquier =

- Municipality
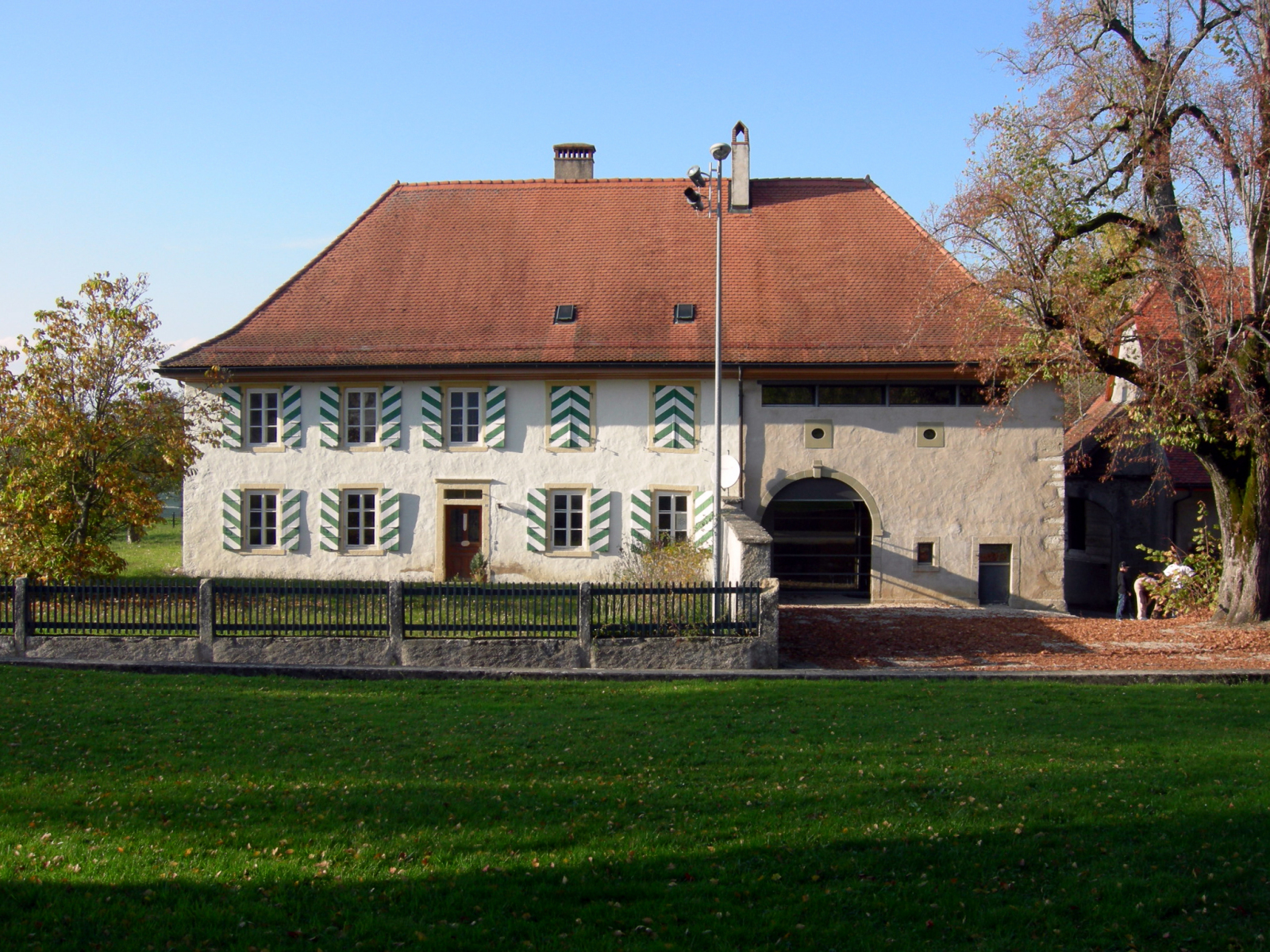
- Cure building in Le Pâquier village

- Flag Coat of arms
- Location of Chêne-Pâquier
- Location within Switzerland Location within Canton of Vaud
- Coordinates: 46°46′N 6°46′E
- Country: Switzerland
- Canton: Vaud
- District: Jura-Nord Vaudois

Government
  - Mayor: Syndic

Area
  - Total: 2.11 km^{2} (0.81 sq mi)
- Elevation: 662 m (2,172 ft)

Population (2003)
  - Total: 105
  - Density: 49.8/km^{2} (129/sq mi)
- Time zone: UTC+01:00 (CET)
  - Summer (DST): UTC+02:00 (CEST)
- Postal code: 1464
- SFOS number: 5908
- ISO 3166 code: CH-VD
- Surrounded by: Champtauroz, Chavannes-le-Chêne, Démoret, Molondin
- Website: www.chene-paquier.ch

Chêne-Pâquier is a municipality in the district of Jura-Nord Vaudois of the canton of Vaud in Switzerland.

== History ==
Pâquier is first mentioned in 1462 as Pascua. In 1517 it was mentioned as Pasquier and in 1550, Chêne was mentioned as loz Chanoz.

== Geography ==
Aerial view (1963)

Chêne-Pâquier has an area, as of 2009, of 2.1 square kilometers (0.81 mi^{2}). Of this area, 1.46 km^{2} (0.56 mi^{2}) or 68.9% is used for agricultural purposes, while 0.51 km^{2} (0.20 mi^{2}) or 24.1% is forested. Of the rest of the land, 0.11 km^{2} (27 acres) or 5.2% is settled (buildings or roads).

Of the built up area, housing and buildings made up 0.9% and transportation infrastructure made up 3.8%. Out of the forested land, 22.6% of the total land area is heavily forested and 1.4% is covered with orchards or small clusters of trees. Of the agricultural land, 60.8% is used for growing crops and 7.5% is pastures.

The municipality was part of the Yverdon District until it was dissolved on 31 August 2006, and Chêne-Pâquier became part of the new district of Jura-Nord Vaudois.

The municipality consists of the hamlets of Le Chêne and Le Pâquier.

== Coat of arms ==
The blazon of the municipal coat of arms is Argent, a Base Vert, an Oak Tree proper leaved Vert and fructed of three Acorns Gules.

== Demographics ==
Chêne-Pâquier has a population (as of December 2020) of 143. As of 2008, 2.8% of the population are resident foreign nationals. Over the last 10 years (1999–2009 ) the population has changed at a rate of 4.7%. It has changed at a rate of 3.7% due to migration and at a rate of 0.9% due to births and deaths.

Most of the population (as of 2000) speaks French (98 or 94.2%) as their first language, with German being second most common (4 or 3.8%) and Serbo-Croatian being third (1 or 1.0%).

The age distribution, as of 2009, in Chêne-Pâquier is; 8 children or 7.1% of the population are between 0 and 9 years old and 16 teenagers or 14.3% are between 10 and 19. Of the adult population, 18 people or 16.1% of the population are between 20 and 29 years old. 11 people or 9.8% are between 30 and 39, 15 people or 13.4% are between 40 and 49, and 14 people or 12.5% are between 50 and 59. The senior population distribution is 11 people or 9.8% of the population are between 60 and 69 years old, 12 people or 10.7% are between 70 and 79, there are 6 people or 5.4% who are between 80 and 89, and there is 1 person who is 90 and older.

As of 2000, there were 46 people who were single and never married in the municipality. There were 44 married individuals, 10 widows or widowers and 4 individuals who are divorced.

As of 2000, there were 41 private households in the municipality, and an average of 2.5 persons per household. There were 14 households that consist of only one person and 6 households with five or more people. Out of a total of 42 households that answered this question, 33.3% were households made up of just one person and there was 1 adult who lived with their parents. Of the rest of the households, there are 9 married couples without children, 16 married couples with children There was one single parent with a child or children.

In 2000 there were 25 single family homes (or 64.1% of the total) out of a total of 39 inhabited buildings. There were 3 multi-family buildings (7.7%), along with 10 multi-purpose buildings that were mostly used for housing (25.6%) and 1 other use buildings (commercial or industrial) that also had some housing (2.6%).

In 2000, a total of 39 apartments (88.6% of the total) were permanently occupied, while 2 apartments (4.5%) were seasonally occupied and 3 apartments (6.8%) were empty. As of 2009, the construction rate of new housing units was 0 new units per 1000 residents. The vacancy rate for the municipality, in 2010, was 0%.

The historical population is given in the following chart:

== Heritage sites of national significance ==
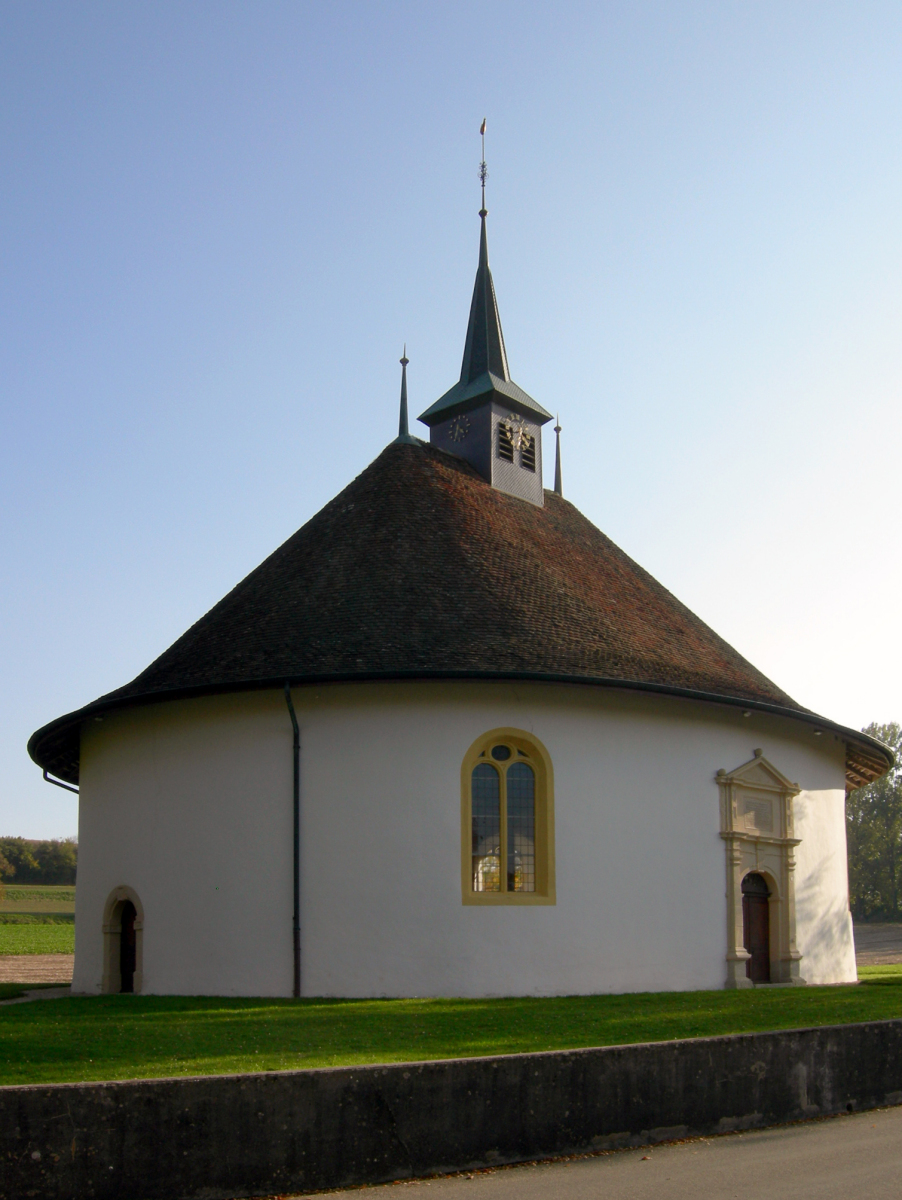
The temple in Le Pâquier

The Temple and Cure is listed as a Swiss heritage site of national significance. The entire area around Chêne-Pâquier is part of the Inventory of Swiss Heritage Sites.

== Politics ==
In the 2007 federal election the most popular party was the SVP which received 36.59% of the vote. The next three most popular parties were the FDP (25.24%), the SP (12.56%) and the Green Party (7.2%). In the federal election, a total of 47 votes were cast, and the voter turnout was 53.4%.

== Economy ==
As of 2010, Chêne-Pâquier had an unemployment rate of 2.5%. As of 2008, there were 10 people employed in the primary economic sector and about 4 businesses involved in this sector. 24 people were employed in the secondary sector and there were 2 businesses in this sector. No one was employed in the tertiary sector. There were 43 residents of the municipality who were employed in some capacity, of which females made up 46.5% of the workforce.

In 2008 the total number of full-time equivalent jobs was 30. The number of jobs in the primary sector was 6, all of which were in agriculture. The number of jobs in the secondary sector was 24, all of which were in construction.

In 2000, there were 5 workers who commuted into the municipality and 30 workers who commuted away. The municipality is a net exporter of workers, with about 6.0 workers leaving the municipality for every one entering. Of the working population, 4.7% used public transportation to get to work, and 67.4% used a private car.

== Religion ==
From the 2000 census, 7 or 6.7% were Roman Catholic, while 93 or 89.4% belonged to the Swiss Reformed Church. Of the rest of the population, there were 2 members of an Orthodox church (or about 1.92% of the population), and there was 1 individual who belongs to another Christian church. 1 (or about 0.96% of the population) belonged to no church, are agnostic or atheist.

== Education ==
In Chêne-Pâquier about 41 or (39.4%) of the population have completed non-mandatory upper secondary education, and 8 or (7.7%) have completed additional higher education (either university or a Fachhochschule). Of the 8 who completed tertiary schooling, 50.0% were Swiss men, 50.0% were Swiss women.

As of 2000, there were 10 students in Chêne-Pâquier who came from another municipality, while 20 residents attended schools outside the municipality.
