= Treytorrens family =

Swiss noble family from the Canton of Vaud

Treytorrens de Treytorrens
- Country: Switzerland
- Current region: Canton of Vaud
- Founded: 12th century
- Current head: Extinct
- Final head: Henri de Treytorrens (1783-1858)
- Titles: Various seigneuries in the Pays de Vaud
- Estate: Treytorrens (Payerne)
- Dissolution: 1858 (male line); 1917 (female line)

The Treytorrens (de Treytorrens) were a Swiss noble family from the Canton of Vaud who held various seigneuries in the Pays de Vaud from the 12th century onwards. The family's ancestral seat was the village of Treytorrens, where they maintained a fortified house. Members of the family became burghers of Yverdon, Estavayer, Payerne, Moudon, Cudrefin, and Bern, and were active in pastoral care, education, science, foreign military service, and for some representatives, in maritime commerce and colonial plantations.

== Origins and territorial holdings ==
The earliest known representatives of the family were the knights Uldriod and Renaud, mentioned from 1160. At the end of the 14th century, Cuénet purchased the seigneury of Treytorrens, which had previously passed to the Bonvillars family. This seigneury, strategically located midway between Yverdon, Estavayer, and Moudon, was later sold in 1543 to Pierre Morel, a burgher of Fribourg, by François de Treytorrens, grandson of François de Treytorrens and the last representative of the Estavayer branch.

Mermod, grandson of an Uldriod and a notary in Yverdon around 1338, founded the local branch of the Treytorrens family. One of its members, Henri, served as governor and defended the city against the Bernese in 1536. Following the Bernese conquest of Vaud, Henri's descendants collaborated with the new rulers. His son, Légier de Treytorrens (1552–1618), successively held the positions of councillor, governor, banneret, castellan, and lieutenant bailiff of Yverdon, and accomplished several official missions on behalf of Bern. From 1695 onwards, family representatives were also long in charge of the city's thermal baths.

== Political and administrative roles ==
Several family members played important political roles with the House of Savoy and in various communes, notably in Yverdon, Payerne, and Cudrefin. The family's political influence was particularly notable in Yverdon, where they served in various administrative capacities and maintained close ties with both the Savoyard and later Bernese authorities. Their political activities spanned several centuries, adapting to the changing political landscape of the Pays de Vaud.

== Education, religion, and science ==
Several Treytorrens distinguished themselves in education, religion, and science. Nicolas Samuel de Treytorrens, mayor of Cudrefin, was banished in perpetuity in 1717 for defending Pietists and Anabaptists. Pierre-Jacob de Treytorrens (1691–1760), a pastor and mathematician, became a correspondent of the Academy of Sciences of Paris in 1718, alongside his cousin and colleague François-Frédéric de Treytorrens. The latter's son, Louis de Treytorrens, was also a professor of philosophy at the Academy of Lausanne. François-Benjamin de Treytorrens (1735–1816), initially a bank employee, briefly served as secretary to Voltaire at Ferney (probably between 1761 and 1765), then worked as a tutor in Ireland and later as a farmer in Eclagnens.

== Military service ==
Nearly thirty family members distinguished themselves in military service for France, England, the Netherlands, Sweden, Denmark, Savoy, Prussia, Spain, and various German principalities. Guillaume de Treytorrens (before 1482-c. 1545), captain of the bodyguard of Francis I of France, was taken prisoner at the Battle of Pavia in 1525 and released upon payment of ransom. He had previously negotiated with Zurich for mercenary levies for France in 1521. François Treytorrens (died of plague), brother of Albert Treytorrens, was an influential military engineer.

Isaac Treytorrens (1603–1645) served Sweden, then the Duchy of Saxe-Weimar, again Sweden, and finally France, which he joined with the regiment of which he was colonel. As superintendent of fortifications, he built the strongholds of Luxembourg, Thionville in Lorraine, and Breisach in Breisgau. He died at the siege of Bourbourg in northern France. Abraham Treytorrens, an officer in Spanish service, was governor of Messina in Sicily.

== Colonial ventures and maritime commerce ==
Some Treytorrens engaged overseas in colonial troops, launched into maritime commerce, or became plantation owners in Suriname and Saint-Domingue. Jean-Philippe de Treytorrens (1650–1704) enlisted in troops sent to the Dutch East Indies (Indonesia) from 1672 to 1689. Frédéric de Treytorrens (1696–1735) owned a plantation in Suriname which he bequeathed upon his death (which occurred in the Dutch East Indies) to his nephew François-Marc de Treytorrens (1709–1739), who subsequently died in that colony.

The twins Daniel-Emmanuel and François-Sébastien de Treytorrens (1719–1747) emigrated together to Batavia (Jakarta) and died there simultaneously, though their activities there remain unknown. Their brother David-Philippe de Treytorrens, an officer in French service, was stationed in Saint-Domingue (Haiti), where he reached the rank of major general with the rank of lieutenant colonel. Nicolas-Louis de Treytorrens (1723–1756), another member of the family, initially a page to Prince Henry, brother of Frederick II of Prussia, later became an officer in French service in Saint-Domingue, where he married the widow of a planter.

Several family representatives also settled in Marseille and appear to have created a maritime commerce business whose principal organizer was Henri-François de Treytorrens, brother of Daniel-Emmanuel, François-Sébastien, David-Philippe, and Nicolas-Louis de Treytorrens. Between approximately 1773 and 1780, he launched a brief career as a merchant-shipowner trading with Mocha in Yemen and with Île de France (Mauritius). In 1777, one of his ships, the Iris, was captured by the English.

== Extinction ==
The family died out in the male line with Henri de Treytorrens (1783–1858), the last of the Treytorrens of Cudrefin. Henriette-Elisabeth-Hélène (1837–1917), of the Cudrefin-Yverdon branch, was the last to bear the Treytorrens name. Her aunt Eugénie de Treytorrens (1785–1856), who converted to Catholicism around 1812–1813, maintained a tumultuous romantic and intellectual relationship with the Valaisan Charles d'Odet, a lawyer and notary. Their correspondence from the years 1812-1817 has been published.

== See also ==
- Henri-François de Treytorrens

== Bibliography ==
- Vuilleumier, Auguste; Reymond, Maxime: "Treytorrens", in: Recueil de généalogies vaudoises, I/2, 1914, pp. 187–242.
- Rambert, Gaston: Histoire du commerce de Marseille. VI. De 1660 à 1789. Les Colonies, 1959.
- Putallaz, Pierre-Alain: Eugénie de Treytorrens et Charles d'Odet. Etude de leur correspondance inédite (1812-1817), 2 vol., 1985.
- Schüle, Christian: "Le tourisme thermal à Yverdon-les-Bains au XVIIIe siècle", in: Revue historique vaudoise, 114, 2006, pp. 99–112.
