= Gossens =

- Former municipality
- Flag Coat of arms
- Location of Gossens
- Location within Switzerland Location within Canton of Vaud
- Coordinates: 46°44′N 06°42′E
- Country: Switzerland
- Canton: Vaud
- District: Yverdon

Area
  - Total: 1.02 km^{2} (0.39 sq mi)
- Elevation: 538 m (1,765 ft)

Population (2003)
  - Total: 128
  - Density: 125/km^{2} (325/sq mi)
- Time zone: UTC+01:00 (CET)
  - Summer (DST): UTC+02:00 (CEST)
- Postal code: 1407
- SFOS number: 5917
- ISO 3166 code: CH-VD
- Surrounded by: Bioley-Magnoux, Cronay, Donneloye, Orzens
- Website: Profile (in French), SFSO statistics

Gossens was a municipality in the district of Yverdon of the canton of Vaud in Switzerland. It merged with neighbouring Donneloye on January 1, 2008.

It is situated on the main road between Yverdon and Moudon. Its economy is mostly agricultural.
